= Hathor Exploration =

Canadian uranium mining company

Hathor Exploration Limited
- Type: Subsidiary
- Industry: Uranium mining
- Predecessor: Longview Minerals Ltd.; Sixgill Minerals Ltd.
- Founded: June 28, 1996 in Alberta
- Headquarters: Vancouver, Canada
- Parent: Rio Tinto
- Subsidiaries: Northern Continental Resources Inc.; Roughrider Uranium Corp.; Terra Ventures Inc.

Hathor Exploration Limited is a uranium exploration company based in Vancouver, British Columbia, Canada. Its exploration office is located in Saskatoon, Saskatchewan, Canada. Hathor's exploration projects concentrate on properties within the Athabasca Basin of Northern Saskatchewan, Canada.

In 2009, Hathor Exploration was reported as having the sixth most significant exploration project in Saskatchewan (based on expenditures) and the 51st out of 100 in Canada at their midwest property in the Athabasca Basin, by Natural Resources Canada.

The name Hathor was inspired by the ancient Egyptian goddess, who was one of the more popular deities throughout the history of Ancient Egypt, was also the patron goddess of miners in ancient Egyptian culture.

== History ==
The company was founded on June 28, 1996, in Alberta as Longview Minerals Ltd. Following its inception, the company then moved out of Alberta and was renamed pursuant to the Canada Business Corporations Act under the name of Sixgill Minerals Ltd. on September 26, 1996. On May 28, 1997, the company changed its name to Hathor Exploration Limited.

In 2006, Hathor Exploration completed the acquisition of Roughrider Uranium Corp. which led to the discovery of the Roughrider Deposit of their midwest property. Then, in 2009 and 2011 respectively, Hathor Exploration acquired Northern Continental Resources Inc. and Terra Ventures Inc. giving the company full control of both the Russell Lake and the northeast midwest properties.

On August 26, 2011, Cameco announced its intention to acquire all of the outstanding shares of Hathor Exploration Limited, and made an all-cash offer to shareholders of $3.75 CAD per Hathor share. This announcement initiated a bidding process between Cameco Corp. and Rio Tinto which came to an end on November 30, 2011. Rio Tinto succeeded in its bid to acquire Hathor Exploration by obtaining 70.21% of the outstanding Hathor common shares on a fully diluted basis through their all-cash offer of $4.70 CAD per Hathor share.

On January 12, 2012, Rio Tinto announced that it had successfully acquired 135,290,661 Hathor common shares, representing 100% of the outstanding Hathor common shares on a fully diluted basis. As a result, Hathor de-listed from the Toronto Stock Exchange.

== Roughrider deposit and discovery ==
The most significant assets attributed to Hathor Exploration is the Midwest Northeast Project and the Roughrider Deposit's multiple zones of uranium mineralization.

The Roughrider Deposit's West Zone was discovered in February 2008 with drill hole MWNE-08-12 which showed concentrations of up to 5.29% U_{3}O_{8} over 3.3m.

As of May 17, 2011, the Roughrider Deposit contained a NI 43–101 compliant combined resource (indicated and inferred) of 57.94 million pounds U_{3}O_{8} (Resource estimates prepared by SRK Consulting (Canada) Inc., a division of SRK Consulting), where intercepts have shown grades of up to 81.9% U_{3}O_{8}. The resource estimates to date have only included the west and east zones of the Roughrider Deposit and not the recently discovered far east zone. The west zone of mineralization currently accounts for 27.81 million pounds U_{3}O_{8} at an average grade of between 1.98% (indicated) & 11.03% (inferred) U_{3}O_{8}, while the larger east zone currently accounts for 30.13 million pounds U_{3}O_{8} of the total estimated resource at 11.58% U_{3}O_{8}.

With all current resource estimates taken into account, the Roughrider Deposit is currently the third-highest grade uranium deposit in the world, following Cameco's McArthur River and Cigar Lake Deposits.

The River Reef Zone (RRZ) of mineralization is located in the same region which also accommodates several other significant uranium deposits. Roughly 4 km to the southwest is the midwest uranium deposit owned by AREVA Resources Canada Inc, Denison Mines Corp. and OURD Canada Co., Ltd. which contains 41.7 million pounds of U_{3}O_{8} at a grade of 5.47%, and only 900 meters to the southwest is the Midwest A discovery (formerly known as the Mae Zone) which contains an additional 19.5 million pounds of U_{3}O_{8} at a grade of 1.57%, and is also owned jointly owned by AREVA Resources Canada Inc, Denison Mines Corp. and OURD Canada Co., Ltd.

== Corporate activities ==
As a result of negotiations regarding either the acquisition and/or management of various properties Hathor Exploration Limited had previously entered into joint venture agreements, with Forum Uranium Corp., Northern Continental Resources Inc., Triex Minerals Corporation, Terra Ventures Inc., and ESO Uranium Corp. on various projects across Canada.

In March 2009, Hathor Exploration spun-out its Eskay Creek precious metals project to form the new company called Standard Exploration Ltd. (until October 7, 2010, known as MAX Minerals Ltd.) which now oversees all aspects of that project.

In December, 2009 Hathor Exploration completed its acquisition of Northern Continental Resources Ltd. where through a financial agreement, Hathor became the owner of 100% of the interest in the Russell Lake property which is located 15 km northeast of the Key Lake mine/mill complex and 12 km southeast of the McArthur River uranium mine, which was previously divided between the two companies.

On August 5, 2011, Hathor Exploration took full ownership and control of the issued and outstanding securities of Terra Ventures Incorporated. This arrangement consolidated a 100% interest in the Roughrider uranium deposit and 100% interest in the Russell Lake exploration project, located at either end, respectively, of the eastern corridor of the Athabasca Basin.

== Corporate governance ==
Corporate personnel at the time that the company was delisted from the Toronto Stock Exchange were:

- Mike Gunning, president, chief executive officer and director
- James P. Malone, director and chairman of the board, chairman of the special committee
- Jay Fredericks, vice president of project development
- Alistair McCready, vice president of exploration
- Andriyko Herchak, chief financial officer
- Benjamin Ainsworth, advisor to the board, special projects and new business opportunities
- John Currie, director and chairman of the compensation committee
- Martin Glynn, director and chairman of the audit committee

== See also ==
- Nuclear power
- Prospective/Proposed Uranium Mines
