= List of wolf attacks in North America =

There have been few documented and undocumented wolf attacks on humans in North America in comparison to wolf attacks in Eurasia, and few relative to attacks by other larger carnivores.

== Fatal attacks ==
Below is an amalgamated list of attacks on humans by wolves.

| Victim(s) | Age | Sex | Date | Type of attack | Location | Details | Source(s) |
|---|---|---|---|---|---|---|---|
| Candice Berner | 32 | ♀ | 2010-03-08 | Predatory | Chignik, Alaska, US, 75 mi (121 km) southwest of Kodiak | Berner, a teacher and avid jogger, was discovered dead along a road by snowmobilers, who found wolf tracks in the adjacent snow. The Alaska State Medical Examiner ruled that her death was caused by "multiple injuries due to animal mauling." A series of necropsies performed on wolves culled in the surrounding area shortly after the attack ruled out rabies, sickness, or wolf-dog hybridisation as being causes of the attack. The verified case was notable as being the first recorded fatal wolf attack in Alaska in which DNA evidence was gathered to confirm wolf involvement. | Findings, Alaska Department of Fish and Game |
| Kenton Carnegie | 22 | ♂ | 2005-11-08 | Predatory | Points North Landing, Saskatchewan, Canada | In the weeks leading up to the assault, natural prey for local wolves was becoming scarce. Four wolves at Points North Landing had begun feeding on camp garbage that fall and were habituating increasingly to human activities. On 4 November 2005 two of Carnegie's camp companions, an experienced bush pilot and a geophysicist, met up with two aggressive wolves on the airfield close to camp. The two young men beat back the assault, photographed the wolves and told everybody in camp. They later turned their photos over to the investigating authorities. This incident is now presumed to have been an exploratory assault by the wolves that fits a pattern leading up to predation. On 8 November, the bush pilot warned Carnegie to not walk near Wollaston Lake, but he ignored it. Carnegie hiked in the snow, but did not return to the geological surveyor camp. His body was found partially consumed in an area known to be frequented by four wolves (two gray-tans, one black, and one white) which regularly fed on human garbage. The pathologist who performed the autopsy testified Carnegie had lost about 25% to 30% of his body mass in the assault, with the top midsection to the thigh having been partially consumed. Although originally the possibility that the culprit was a black bear was not ruled out, a coroners' jury concluded after a two-year inquiry that the attackers had indeed been a wolf pack. | Dr. Valerius Geist, University of Calgary; Evidence review and Findings, Alaska Department of Fish and Game |
| Patricia Wyman | 23–24 | ♀ | 1996-04-18 | Captive | Haliburton Forest, Haliburton County, Ontario, Canada | Wyman was a wildlife biologist who worked as a caretaker in the Wolf Centre section of the Haliburton Forest & Wildlife Reserve. She was killed by five captive wolves on the third day of her employment. | Dr. Erich Klinghammer |
| Alyshia Berczyk | 3 | ♀ | 1989-06-03 | Captive | Forest Lake, Minnesota, US | By her family's wolf in the backyard of her father's home. She died of liver damage incurred when the wolf slammed her into the ground. | Rochester, Minnesota Post-Bulletin |
| Marc Leblond | 3 or 5 | ♂ | 1963-09-24 | Predatory | Route 389, North of Baie-Comeau, Québec, Canada | Said to be the first fully confirmed wolf attack in Québec. Two wolves attacked Leblond as he was playing outside with his younger brother. A few minutes later, the younger brother came back to his parents, crying and terrified. They first thought Marc drowned and called the police. They first checked the lake, then the forest. After a few minutes, not deep within the forest, they found a ~80 lb (36 kg) wolf, which they could not shoot as they were not armed, and Marc's body. According to the Baie-Comeau district coroner, Marc had teeth marks all around his shredded throat, with the torso open, the heart and lungs having been eaten. The tracks of an adult wolf accompanied by a young one were also found. Apparently, his body had been dragged around 500 ft (150 m). | La Presse, 26 September 1963, 19 November 1963, 7 April 1976 |
| Inuk boy | Child | ♂ | 1943 | Rabid | Wainwright, Alaska | Died of rabies from a wolf bite. | NINA: Norsk institutt for naturforskning "The Fear of Wolves: A review of wolf attacks on humans" John D. C. Linnell, et al. January 2002 |
| Inuk hunter | Adult | ♂ | 1942 | Rabid | Noorvik, Alaska | Died of rabies from a wolf bite. | NINA: Norsk institutt for naturforskning "The Fear of Wolves: A review of wolf attacks on humans" John D. C. Linnell, et al. January 2002 |
| Karl Lynn | Adult | ♂ | 1923, March | Pack of wolves | Île-à-la-Crosse, Saskatchewan | "March 16, 1923 Karl Lynn world war veteran and one of the best known trappers and mushers in the north country is believed to have lost his life in a fight with a pack of timber wolves, two hunters reported here today. They said they thought his body had been devoured by the pack after he had killed six of the wolves. Shreds of clothing and a gun, identified as belonging to Lynn, surrounded by the carcasses of six wolves, were found by the hunters near Cree Lake, 20 mi (32 km) north of Île-à-la-Crosse, but the hunter's body was lacking. Lynn was an expert rifleman and during the war served as a sniper. Body not recovered. | San Bernardino Sun, Volume 51, Number 88,17 March 1923; Medicine Hat News, 16 March 1923 |
| Three men | Adults | ♂ | 1922-12-23 | n/a | 2 mi (3.2 km) and 4 mi (6.4 km) from Port Arthur, Ontario, near the Sturgeon River | On 23 December, an elderly trapper left his camp to "mush down" to the village to pick up his mail. Later in the day, 2 mi (3.2 km) from the settlement, two First Nations men discovered his bones and blood in the snow amidst torn pieces of harness. The two men took their own dog teams and extra ammunition out in pursuit of the same wolves but did not return. The following day, 2 mi (3.2 km) from the village beyond the scene of the first fatal attack, a search party discovered the rifles and bones of the two First Nations men amidst bits of clothing and empty shells. Scattered in a circle about the scene were the carcasses of 16 wolves. | The Weekly Journal-Miner (Prescott, AZ) |
| Unknown man, falsely presumed to be Ben Cochrane | Adult | ♂ | 1922, April | n/a | Fisher River near Lake Winnipeg in Manitoba | When searchers arrived at the scene of an attack by a large pack of timber wolves, they found the bones of a man's body, a rifle with a broken buttstock, and the bones of eleven large timber wolves. The man was initially presumed to be Ben Cochrane, as he was employed in trapping animals in the area. Seven of the wolves discovered at the scene had been shot and four had been clubbed to death by the man's rifle buttstock. It is likely the remaining wolf pack overwhelmed the man, causing his death. On May 18, 1922, Ben Cochrane turned up alive and well in Winnipeg. | The Calgary Daily Herald |
| Two Native American ("Indian") children | Children | ♂ and ♀ | 1904 or before | n/a | Fort du Lac (?), Saskatchewan, Canada | They were abandoned by their father in the forest without food or shelter, with the intention of getting rid of them. They were apparently eaten by wolves, and only their clothes were found. Their father was jailed. | L'écho de Charlevoix |
| Edward Connors | 18 | ♂ | 1901 | n/a | Gatineau District, Québec, Canada | He departed from the logging camp of Bark Lake to take an axe from his home to sharpen it by the next day. Seeing that he had not came back and hearing wolves howl, some fellow workers searched for him. After a few minutes, they found his torn body, in a large puddle of blood. | Le Trifluvien |
| Ferdinand Ménard | 30s | ♂ | 1895 | n/a | Montérégie, Québec | Having gone missing, his body was found after two days of search. They found his shredded, bloodied clothes, his crucifix and two medals wrapped in leather. It is thought he was killed by wolves. He came from the "province of Québec". | Le Courrier de St-Hyacinthe |
| Son of Alexander Belliveau | Adult | ♂ | 1893 | n/a | Northern Michigan | Belliveau and a friend were hunting when a band of wolves surrounded and overcame them, despite the young men firing shots into the pack. The friend climbed a tree and watched as Belliveau was torn to pieces by the wolves at the foot of the same tree. The wolves kept Belliveau's companion trapped in the tree for several more hours until Belliveau's co-workers from a nearby railroad construction camp arrived and drove the wolves away. | Southwest Sentinel |
| Woman and her two children | Adult and 2 children | ♂ and ♀ | 1890s, early | n/a | Mexico, in the Sierra Madre Occidental Mountains between Durango and the Pacific coast | A horseman met a woman and two children who were walking to a relative's remote home. He offered to accompany them as protection from the dangers of wolves (species Mexican wolf) and robbers. The mother declined. The next travelers a short time later found the remains of the three, scattered on the same trail. The cited source indicates the incident was not a lone anecdote but representative of frequent incidents, owing to the fact the local residents were poorly armed. | J. Hampden Porter |
| Surname "Olson" | 2 Adults | ♂ | 1888-03-06 | Predatory | New Rockford, North Dakota | Mother from inside the house witnessed a large pack of wolves surround, attack, kill, and eat her husband and son, about ten rods (165 ft (50 m)) away. The pack then tried and failed to get in the house. Investigators found their bones. | The St. Paul Daily Globe |
| Mr. Duging | Adult | ♂ | 1885, January | n/a | Menominee, Michigan | The temperature had dropped to −43 °F (−42 °C) one night in mid January, the weather was severe and small game had become scarce. Mr. Duging failed to return that night from a hunting trip. His friends found his body gnawed to the bone the following morning, within 2 mi (3.2 km) of their logging camp. Thirteen wolves that he had shot dead lay scattered near his body. At his side was his Winchester rifle with one round still loaded in the chamber. | Las Vegas Daily Gazette |
| unidentified | Adult | ♂ | 1873, February | n/a | "20 mi. N. of Perry's Mills" in Wisconsin | A farmer walked out of the woods and found a pair of boots with the deceased's feet still in them, particles of clothing, bones, a dead dog and two dead wolves. The presumption of the cause was that the deceased was traveling between two lumber camps and the wolves attacked due to the harsh winter and dearth of prey. Wolves had been very problematic at that time. Presently, Perry's Lumber mill operates near New Auburn, Wisconsin. | The Daily Phoenix |
| Morris Powers | Adult | ♂ | 1871, January | n/a | Logging camp near Pine City, Minnesota | While eating dinner, Mr. Powers was attacked by wolves and devoured before assistance could reach him. Two wolves later killed by poison were found to have consumed portions of his clothing and twelve brass buttons. The news story first appeared in The Stillwater Messenger. | The Saint Cloud Journal |
| Corporal Michael McGillicuddy of the 3rd Infantry, Company C | Adult | ♂ | 1868-08-05 at 2200 hrs | Rabid | Fort Larned National Historic Site, 5.5 mi (8.9 km) west of Larned, Kansas | A rabid wolf entered the Ft. Larned military outpost on the Arkansas River, furiously snapping at everything and everyone, tearing tents, curtains, bed clothes, etc. It entered the hospital and bit a bedridden patient, Corporal McGillicuddy, severely on the left hand and right arm and nearly severed off the left little finger. The wolf then rushed into a group of ladies and gentlemen who were gathered socially and singing on the front steps of Colonel Wynkoop's house. It bit Lt. Thompson of the 3rd U.S. Infantry, severely wounding him in both legs. Colonel Wynkoop and his scout James Morrison immediately took up arms and gave chase as the wolf ran into another structure and bit a Private soldier with the 10th Cavalry Buffalo Soldiers in two places. A sentry at the guard house fired a shot that went over the wolf's back as the wolf ran between his own legs. The wolf entered the quarters of the laundress and tried to attack her in her bed, but she was protected by the bed covers. The wolf finally charged at the sentinel at the haystack, but the guard shot it dead and escaped injury. The injuries were all cauterized with nitrate of silver and washed with alkali washes regularly at the base infirmary. Hospital records show that on the evening of 6 September, Corporal McGillicuddy began showing marked signs and symptoms of hydrophobia. No further treatment was given to him. He died on 9 September. A large Newfoundland dog that also had been bitten died with marked symptoms of hydrophobia. The other patients fully recovered. Hospital records indicated speculation that Corporal McGillicuddy's refusal to allow amputation of his finger may have contributed to his death. Lt -Col. Dodge made inquiry with Indians camped in the local vicinity. They told him attacks by rabid wolves that entered into their village were not infrequent, and they knew of no person who had received even the smallest scratch from a rabid wolf ever to have recovered. | |
| Unidentified | Adult | ♂ | 1868, February | n/a | Cacapon Mountain in West Virginia | A resident living on the mountain was rumored to have been killed by wolves after first killing six wolves with an axe. | Winchester News |
| Deer hunter | Adult | ♂ | 1867, March | n/a | Searcy, Arkansas | A hunter had killed a deer and was skinning it when he was attacked by wolves. His body was nearly devoured when discovered. | |
| Two children | 6 and 9 | Unknown | 1867-12-10 | Predatory | Saint-Malachie, Canada | A mother went to the forest with her children, when she heard screaming next to her. Wolves quickly rushed to her children and "ate" them. They also wounded the mother, but she managed to escape home. | L'événement |
| unknown | Adult | ♂ | 1859, March | n/a | 6 mi (9.7 km) outside Lexington, Michigan | A man was chopping wood outside his home when a wolf grabbed him by the throat. The man's wife saw the attack, picked up her husband's axe and killed the wolf but the bite to the man's throat was immediately fatal. | The Cass County Republican |
| unidentified person | unknown | unknown | 1857, July or August | Rabid | near present-day Green Valley, Arizona | Rabid wolves were entering camps, towns and even homes where the doors were open. Six people were bitten, one was severely mangled and one died. | (Note: Way, Phocion R. (Autumn 1960). Duffen, William A. (ed.). "Overland via "Jackass Mail" in 1858: The Diary of Phocion Way (Part III)". Arizona and the West. 2 (3). Journal of the Southwest: 289. ISSN 0004-1408. JSTOR 40167036, "… they tell me there is one danger which threatens out door sleepers during July and August, which fills me with more dread than all the venomous reptiles and Indians thrown in- this new danger is from "mad wolves."^{37} I have always associated everything that is horrible with the disease Hydrophobia and I would run faster from a Mad Dog than I would from a legion of Devils. The wolves are numerous here and in the two above named months they sometimes go made [sic] and in this condition they will enter a camp or town or even a house if the door is left open and bite everything in their course. At this season the Mexicans generally (those that have no doors) sleep on top of their houses out of reach of this danger.This horrible disease is much more common here among the wolves than it is among our dogs in the States. They are a terror to the whole country. One of our men told me of six persons who were bitten in this thinly settled neighborhood last year. One of them was badly mangled by the rabid animal, and in one instance the wolf entered a house and bit two persons. But what appears very singular to me, only one of these persons died. I have always been accustomed to look upon this disease as incurable, but here they have a stone which attracts the poison and when it is applied in time it never fails to cure.^{38} This fact is so well established that I cannot reasonably doubt it, and it should be known far and wide that others may profit by it. Footnote 37: The wolf was common in the area at that time. Way's informant probably included the coyote, with the wolf, as subject to hydrophobia. Footnote 38: An interesting documented instance of the use of a madstone to draw poison from an animal bite. Described by the Encyclopedia Americana as " a vegetable substance or stone which, when applied to a wound caused by the bite of a mad dog, is said to prevent hydrophobia," the madstone has been celebrated in literature (e.g. Sir Walter Scott's The Talisman') and is occasionally chronicled in the annals of Western lore. Some 130 cases of healing, attributed to the madstone, are on record; and there are reported to be three authenticated stones in the United States today.") |
| Son and daughter of Mr. Stockdale | children | ♂ & ♀ | 1857-01-05 | n/a | within 2 mi (3.2 km) from a fork on the Little Sioux River near Woodbury County, Iowa | Wolves had become "so ravenous as to destroy horses and cattle to a considerable extent, and that they have often attacked persons." On 5 January 1857, the Stockdale children left their residence for a party about 2 mi (3.2 km) away and were never seen again. After a failed search, they were assumed killed and eaten by wolves. A letter from a gentleman who had been in that area indicated wolves had chased him 4 mi (6.4 km) and he barely escaped. | |
| 2 women | Adult | ♀ | 1856-10-27 | n/a | Mornington Township Perth County, Ontario | Two women left home in the evening to search for cattle. They did not return. The next morning a search party found their skeletons. A third possible victim, an adult male, had also gone missing from the same area at the same time and had not been seen for ten days. | |
| Young woman | 23 | ♀ | 1856, Mid-January | n/a | Pottawattamie County, Iowa | While a young woman was returning home from a prayer meeting with her father and sister, their horse was attacked by wolves and became unmanageable. The source does not state whether the victim was mounted on the horse or riding in a wagon. The 23-year-old woman was partly thrown and partly dragged to the ground and devoured. This allowed the other two family members to escape. When the neighbors came to the spot to hunt for the wolves, they found only a few shreds of clothing and a shoe. | Grand River Times |
| Teenage boy | 13 | ♂ | 1856, Mid-January | n/a | Pottawattamie County, Iowa | The boy hiked 0.5 mi (0.80 km) from his family's home to fetch water from a nearby spring and never returned. Bits of his bloody hair and clothing were later found. | Grand River Times |
| Jim Jenkins | adult | ♂ | 1852, winter | n/a | near White Fox Creek a few miles north of Webster City, Iowa | Four men were on a holiday hunt but a major snowstorm rolled in and they were forced to camp near White Fox Creek. The next morning Jenkins told the others he'd make a circle and shoot some birds for breakfast. The storm worsened that day into 3-day siege on the campsite but Jenkins never returned. A search ensued when the storm passed but the snow was too deep. When the snow finally melted the following spring a partially dismembered human skeleton was found along with a sundered gun barrel and stock and the skeleton of a wolf, 1 mi (1.6 km) from the camp. Jenkins was presumed to have been confused and numb from the cold and then attacked by wolves. | |
| Tommy Speers | 13 | ♂ | 1841 | n/a | Caledon, Ontario | The boy had been helping his father raise a log house for a relative. Toward evening he was allowed to walk home by himself. He was never seen again and all that was found was one shoe between the two houses. Wolves were heard howling that entire night, and thus he was presumed killed by wolves. | |
| Son of Ebenezer Farley | 8-year-old child | ♂ | 1840, mid-April | n/a | Coleman, Upper Canada (near Canada–US border with Michigan) | The boy was presumed lost in the woods. A search party found some mangled body parts presumed to be the result of a wolf attack, since wolves were abundant in the area. | The Columbia Democrat |
| Farm worker | Adult | ♂ | 1836, March | n/a | Liberty Valley, Perry County, Pennsylvania | An African American worker who had spent a day helping neighbors slaughtering stock was attacked while returning home in the evening, carrying portions of meat given to him in pay. Before succumbing he had defended himself with his butchering knife, killing five of the wolves: this led to speculation the pack which attacked him had perhaps numbered "a dozen or more". | The Times The Burlington Free Press |
| George Holmes, a member of the Rocky Mountain Fur Company | Adult | ♂ | 1833, midsummer | Rabid | fur rendezvous on the Green River (Colorado River) | A rabid wolf got into Mr. Fontenelle's camp at the rendezvous and bit men, horses, and a bull. Mr. Holmes "became afflicted with rabies and died a horrible and agonizing death." | |
| Young person worker | Adult | ♂ | c. 1820, Winter | Predatory | Along the Ohio River in Kentucky | Two young black workers walking on a path in an unpopulated area at night were attacked by a pack of wolves. They fought with axes and killed three wolves, but one young man was killed. The other escaped up a tree, where he witnessed the wolves consume his companion, and waited until the wolves left the next day. Blood and bones were found at the scene. | John J. Audubon |
| John Pencil | Adult | ♂ | 1780, Shortly after the Loyalists were expelled from the Thirteen Colonies | n/a | Canada | In 1778 John Pencil, a Loyalist, caught his brother Henry fleeing with other American Patriots to Monocacy Island, and killed him for treason. After the Loyalists were expelled in 1780, John Pencil fled from Tryon County, New York, to Canada (present-day Ontario). He was attacked there by wolves three different times. Local Natives rescued him the first two times, but seeing him as wicked and cursed for killing his brother, they told him they would not help him a third time. John Pencil was attacked a third time by wolves, and having no rescuers, he was torn to pieces. | |
| Plains Indians and other tribes stricken with smallpox | n/a | n/a | 1750 to 1782 | n/a | Atlantic seaboard, Delaware Bay and areas under control of Hudson's Bay Company | Wolves were drawn by the stench of unburied corpses that they devoured. The wolves also entered tents and attacked and killed the sick and helpless. Sometimes but not always, the stronger tribe members were able to drive the wolves off. The tribe's starving dogs also joined in the depredations. | |
| Caroline Allen | 17 | ♀ | 1761 - 1781, January midnight | n/a | Bennington, Vermont | Four young ladies and two young men including Harry Mason were traveling back to the settlement after a quilting "frolic". Wolves attacked and all six climbed an oak tree. The branch on which Caroline Allen was standing broke off. She fell screaming to the ground where the hungry wolves quickly tore her to pieces and devoured her. Her sweetheart, Harry Mason, witnessed her demise and was so disturbed by it that he drank himself to death not long afterward. An eyewitness described the wolves as starving. | |

== Non-fatal attacks ==
Because of the relative rarity of documented wolf attacks on humans in North America, some non-fatal attacks have been of interest to experts.

| Victim(s) | Age | Gender | Date | Type of attack | Location | Details | Source(s) |
|---|---|---|---|---|---|---|---|
| Adult | | | 2024-09 | Stalking, bite | Canada, Yellowknife, Ranney Hill trail | A dog walker was followed and bit. | |
| Adults (2) | | | 2024-08-19 | Bite | Coldfoot, Alaska | Two motorists were attacked by a black wolf while they were outside their vehicle due to construction work in the area. They suffered puncture wounds. | |
| Stanley Russ | 72 | ♂ | 2020-05-29 | Predatory | Port Edward, British Columbia, Canada | A lone wolf lunged at a man who was returning home from visiting his friends. He was badly injured and subsequently sent to Vancouver General Hospital. | CBC News |
| Karleigh Hudson | | ♂ | 2019-11-17 | Captive | Paso Robles, California, United States | An unpaid man was working at the non-profit rescue center. He suffered puncture injuries and scratches to his hands from a six-year-old neutered male wolf. The wolf was under quarantine at the rescue center and remained under observation for one week while it was checked for rabies. | KSBY News |
| Ted Schlosser | Adult | ♂ | 2019-08-15 | Predatory | Ely, Minnesota, United States | A wolf assaulted Ted Schlosser who was walking his four dogs on the Trezona Trail near Shagawa Lake. Schlosser and his dogs successfully returned to his truck for their safety. His dog that suffered the incident was treated at the Ely Veterinary Clinic with a single wound on his right shoulder. | Ely Echo, Duluth News Tribune and Timberjay |
| Matt Rispoli | Adult | ♂ | 2019-08-09 | Predatory | Banff National Park, Alberta, Canada | A wolf assaulted a camper, Matt Rispoli, who was trying to protect his children, from a tent at the Ramparts Creek campground on the Icefields Parkway north of Lake Louise. A man from Calgary came to their aid. Rispoli was taken to a local hospital to recover from severe injuries. | CTV News and CBC.ca |
| Boy | 4 | ♂ | 2019-05-16 | Predatory | Camano Island, Island County, Washington, United States | A four-year-old boy was playing with another child on Lost Forest Lane when a fourteen-month-old wolf-hybrid assaulted him. The little boy was taken to Providence Hospital with serious injuries to his head, neck, hip, groin and buttocks. | KCPQ and KIRO-TV |
| Paul Moore | Adult | ♂ | 2019-05-15 | Predatory | Duluth, Minnesota, United States | Two wolves charged at Moore's chocolate Labrador Retriever while searching for deer antlers with his owner. Moore successfully rescued it by swinging his hatchet very hard at the nearest wolf, but totally missed it. He ended up whapping it with the handle and shaking off its grip on his dog. The other wolf was still chewing at the Labrador Retriever's hindquarters, so Moore took another swing on the hatchet as it flew out of his hand. In a last-ditch attempt to come to his dog's aid, he laid on top of his Labrador Retriever like a human shield and kicked at the wolf’s snout. | St. Paul Pioneer Press and City Pages |
| Woman | 38 | ♀ | 2019-02-07 | Predatory | Red Lake, Ontario, Canada | A black wolf stalked and mauled a woman who was walking with her dog near Red Lake Margaret Cochenour Memorial Hospital and was transported to that hospital after this incident. | CBC News |
| Woman | Adult | ♀ | 2018-07-13 | Aggressive behavior | Okanogan County, Washington, United States | A pack of wolves chased a research student near the Tiffany Springs Campground. She climbed 30 ft (9.1 m) up a tree to evade the pack and contacted the Okanogan County Sheriff's office through a satellite telephone. A state Department of Natural Resources helicopter arrived to come to her aid. Its noise warded off the wolves. | Patch Media and The Seattle Times |
| Kristi Krutsinger | Adult | ♀ | 2018-06-22 | Captive | Paso Robles, California, United States | A four-year-old wolfdog mauled Kristi's foot and lower leg. She was working at the WHAR-Wolf Rescue sanctuary at the time of this incident. People nearby including a student of emergency medical technician training heard her shouting and came to her aid. Her leg had to be amputated at a hospital due to her severe injuries. Kristi underwent physical therapy and rehabilitation afterwards. | The Tribune and KSBY |
| Addelyn Walker | 2 | ♀ | 2017-05-29 | Captive | Potosi, Wisconsin, United States | Addelyn who hails from Dubuque, Iowa, was visiting her great grandmother, Sheryl Hess on Memorial Day. According to Addelyn's father Ryan Walker, the great-grandmother owned a wolf and kept it in a cage on her property. The wolf grabbed onto Addelyn's left arm through the cage, which resulted in serious injuries. It was put down at the time of the incident. | WTVG |
| Marcelo Vanzuita | Adult | ♂ | 2017, February | Predatory | Whitehorse, Yukon, Canada | Vanzuita, who hails from Wellington, had a pack of wolves stalk and track him during the Yukon Arctic Ultra race after an early lake crossing. This incident forced him to drop out of the race. | Fairfax New Zealand |
| Skiers | Adult | ♂ | 2016-12-07 | Unprovoked | Smithers, British Columbia, and Mt Norquay, Alberta, Canada | A lone wolf killed a domestic dog and tracked its owner back to Bulkley Valley Nordic Centre's parking lot. The male skier did not have any injures. After this incident, a small wolf pack approached another male skier near Banff National Park. He fled on a snowmobile at that moment. Three wolves in the Bow Valley were getting too close for comfort to the worker at Mount Norquay. They prompted him to hop on his snowmobile. The pack chased him for a very short time. | CBC News and National Post |
| Brent Woodland | 36 | ♂ | 2016-11-01 | Unprovoked | Ucluelet, British Columbia, Canada | Two wolves stalked Brent and his two labrador retrievers while he was jogging near Pacific Rim National Park Reserve. After he found refuge at the Kwisitis Visitors Centre which was closed at the time, he climbed the stairs the balcony and saw two wolves sitting on the beach below. Brent called the emergency number and police sirens frightened the wolf pack away. | Westerly News and Grind TV |
| Andrew Morgan | 26 | ♂ | 2016-10-08 | Predatory | Canmore, Alberta, Canada | Andrew was walking home through a forest near Banff National Park after departing from a bus. He took a shortcut and walked on a path. A few minutes later, he heard some rustling behind him. He noticed that a lone wolf was behind him at that moment. It snarled at him again, but lunged at him afterwards. Andrew turned in the opposite direction and fled from the wolf, but it chased him through the trail. He tried to lose the wolf by going off the trail and through the forest. Andrew fended the wolf with a tree branch multiple times until it released him. He subsequently climbed over a barbed-wire fence, but fell a few times. Andrew finally found his way out of the forest near Holiday Inn in Canmore. The next day, he went to a hospital to get checked over and reported the incident to conservation officers with Alberta Environment and Parks. Officials confirmed this report, but said they could not determine whether it was definitely an actual wolf attack. | The Vancouver Sun and Calgary Herald |
| Worker | 26 | ♂ | 2016-08-29 | Unprovoked | Cigar Lake, Saskatchewan, Canada | An unidentified young contract worker on his midnight break was jumped and mauled by a lone wolf less than one hundred meters from the main camp. A nearby security guard frightened the wolf away. She administered first aid and called for an air ambulance, which airlifted him 675 kilometers to a hospital in Saskatoon, where doctors expect him to recover. After the attack, authorities ordered that area wolves be shot, that food disposal systems and fencing be inspected, and that staff be educated. | CKOM and CBC News |
| Matthew Nellessen | Adult | ♂ | 2015-09-23 | Predatory | Colburn, Adams County, Wisconsin, U.S. | Matthew was scouting a potential hunting area when he made eye contact with a wolf 30 yards away to his right. Then two more wolves began closing in from the left. Within 4 seconds the first wolf lunged and Matthew kicked it in the face, deflecting an attempted bite. Then he shot one of the other two wolves with his sidearm. The pack fled, one bleeding. Matthew quickly retreated to his truck and contacted the state wildlife authorities. | American Hunter |
| Two families on a snowmobile ride | Adults and their children | ♂, ♀, and children | 25 January 2015 | Rabid | On a trail between Wabush and Labrador City, Labrador, Canada | Twenty minutes into the trip, they encountered a wolf on the trail that charged and lunged. They escaped and informed authorities, who soon tracked and killed the wolf, which tested positive for rabies. | CBC News |
| Michelle Prosser | Adult | ♀ | 2013-10-15 | Predatory | Merritt, British Columbia, Canada | Michelle went to do a forestry road traverse near Merritt, but she noticed a few wolves stalking her minutes after heading out of the forest. Michelle managed to escape with her two domesticated dogs, though only one survived the incident. Her other domesticated dog died while protecting her from the wolf pack. | InfoNews |
| Noah Graham, camper | 16 | ♂ | 2013-08-24, 4:30 a.m. | Unprovoked | Near Lake Winnibigoshish in Minnesota, U.S. | Noah was awake and talking to his girlfriend when a lone wolf attacked from behind, biting his head. He kicked, screamed, punched, and grabbed, and it ran off. He was taken to the hospital, requiring 17 staples to close a large head wound and to get precautionary injections. Authorities killed the wolf the next day and sent the body for rabies and DNA testing. The wolf tested negative for rabies but was diagnosed with deformities and brain damage. | NBC News Outside and Star Tribune |
| Mario Lagacé | n/a | ♂ | 2013-08-20 | Unprovoked | Between markers 218 and 219 of route 175 in the Laurentides Wildlife Reserve, Quebec, Canada | While riding his bicycle, a wolf suddenly came out of the woods and pounced on Lagacé, pinning him to the ground in the middle of the two-lane highway. The animal was not growling, snapping, or biting. Upon hearing car noise, the wolf backed up onto the gravel in the shoulder, Lagacé stood up and walked in the opposite direction with his bike, then began flagging down cars. A man driving along the highway stopped to pick him up, and for about 5–7 minutes, the wolf was standing at the edge of the woods staring at them. Lagacé was taken to the emergency room, where he received first aid and precautionary rabies treatment. A month before the attack, another bicyclist had been pursued by a wolf in the same area. Upon learning of the attack on Lagacé, wildlife protection officers set up traps in the area according to their procedure. | Rouge FM and CHMP-FM |
| William "Mac" Hollan, a schoolteacher on 2,750 mi (4,430 km) hunger charity bicycle trek | Adult | ♂ | 2013-07-06 | Unprovoked | Alaska Highway 60 mi. west of Watson Lake, Yukon, Canada | Mr. Hollan was riding 0.5 mi (0.80 km) ahead of his two buddies when a lone wolf sprinted out of the woods and surprised him with an attempted bite just missing his pedal. Hollan unsuccessfully attempted to outrace the wolf and deter it with pepper spray as the wolf ripped open the bike's rear packs. Four attempts to stop passing motorists failed. Hollan approached a hill. As he prepared to stop and use the bike as a weapon, a couple in a Humvee pulling a trailer came to his aid, and threw the passenger door open as Hollan was attempting to climb through the window. The wolf furiously attacked the bicycle packs. The female rescuer unsuccessfully stood in the vehicle's doorway shouting at the wolf from 8 ft (2.4 m) away as passing motorists honked their horns. She threw a water bottle that hit it in the head. It retreated to a ditch. Other motorists threw rocks at the wolf until it left. | Missoulian |
| Dawn Hepp | Adult | ♀ | 2013-03-08 | Predatory | Grand Rapids, Manitoba, Canada | Dawn was driving along Highway 6 when she pulled over to help another driver, and was attacked by a lone wolf as she approached the other car. She drove herself to the hospital in Ashern and was treated for puncture wounds and received rabies vaccinations. | CBC News and NBC News |
| Lance Grangaard | 30 yrs | ♂ | 2012-12-10, week of | Rabid | 30 mi (48 km) off Taylor Highway in remote area known as Ketchumstuk near Tok, Alaska, U.S. | Grangaard was "putting along" on his snow machine on a frozen river when a lone wolf attacked his right arm, ripped through his parka and three layers of underclothing and inflicted a superficial 3" long laceration above Grangaard's elbow. Grangaard, taking the offensive, jumped onto the wolf's back and knocked it hard onto the ice. The wolf freed itself from his grip, ran 15–20 ft (4.6–6.1 m) away, stopped and turned back again facing Grangaard. Grangaard threw his arms up and yelled, which scared the wolf away. Grangaard then escaped on his snow machine. Although the Alaska wildlife authorities were unaware of any rabid animals in the area, Grangaard was treated for potential rabies exposure. The wolf was never captured. | Fairbanks Daily News-Miner |
| Rene Anderson | 55 yrs. | ♀ | 2011-09-25 | Predatory | l10 mi (16 km) south of Pierce near Headquarters, Idaho, U.S. | A lone wolf charged after Rene while she was hunting for elk when it jumped up from behind a pile of logs. Rene quickly drew her .44 magnum Smith and Wesson pistol and killed the 100 lb (45 kg) wolf with four shots. | The Spokesman Review |
| Karen Calisterio | 52 yrs. | ♀ | 2010-11-27, 4:35 p.m. | Narrowly averted | Driveway of her home between Tensed, Idaho and Plummer, Idaho, U.S. | Calisterio was walking alone up her long snowy rural driveway at dusk when she saw a pack of four wolves about 200 yards ahead, near her house. The wolves saw her and began walking toward her. She turned and ran, but remembered that was not recommended in such situations. She then turned around to face the wolves, kept walking backwards as fast as she could, and used her cell phone to summon a neighbor, who arrived in an SUV to rescue her by 4:53PM. During that time, the wolves retreated into some bushes. After the incident, tracks seemed to show that the wolves had come quite close to the woman when she was running, but after she turned to face them, ran off into the bushes and then left, instead of flanking or surrounding her as she had feared. Before the incident, about forty elk had been watering at a nearby pond and using a nearby hay-field as a wintering ground, likely attracting the wolves. | Skinny Moose Media |
| Roderick Phillip | 35 yrs. | ♂ | 2009-09-10, 2 a.m. | Rabid | along the Kuskokwim River near Kalskag, Alaska, U.S. | Phillip and his three hunting partners were camped and Phillips took an unarmed stroll down to the river to look for moose. He was attacked by a rabid, white, 16-month old male lone wolf weighing more than 100 lb (45 kg). The wolf bit him in the upper right thigh, its teeth cutting through a pair of Carhartt pants, sweatpants and his boxers. He wrestled the wolf to the ground and kept him there until his two companions arrived. Then he jumped up and threw the wolf away from them. One of the men with him shot the wolf with a hunting rifle. They dressed the wound and headed for the hospital after daybreak, bringing the carcass with them. The wolf tested positive for rabies and Phillip received post-exposure rabies vaccinations. | Alaska Dispatch News |
| Becky Wannamaker | 25 yrs. | ♀ | 2006-07-07 | Predatory | Dalton Highway near campground northwest of Fairbanks, Alaska, U.S. | Ms. Wanamaker was walking along the highway and saw a big white lone wolf twenty yards away. She ran after it began to charge her. The wolf inflicted puncture wounds in both legs and a laceration in one. Wanamaker was able to take shelter in an outhouse until the wolf left. She made her way to another outhouse and awakened campers sleeping nearby, who assisted her. Wolf biologist Mark McNay speculated that human-habituation and the wolf's young age were key factors in the attack. The wolf was not captured. Wanamaker was vaccinated for potential exposure to rabies. | Juneau Empire |
| Fred Desjarlais, uranium miner | 55 yrs. | ♂ | 2004-12-31 | Predatory | Key Lake, Saskatchewan, Canada | Desjarlais was jogging three kilometres back to Canadian Mining and Energy Corporation's Key Lake campsite after refusing to take a shuttle bus. A lone wolf attacked him from a ditch during the jog. Desjarlais tried to frighten it away, but the wolf continued approach and finally jumped on him. He grabbed it around the neck and tried to wrestle the wolf into submission. A busload of his colleagues spotted the incident and came to his aid. The wolf subsequently fled into the wilderness. Desjarlais received stitches when his colleagues took him to a nearby medical facility. A few hours later, an air ambulance took Desjarlais to Royal University Hospital where he began a series of rabies treatments. After the attack on Desjarlais, governmental authorities built an electric fence around Key Lake's landfill to prevent further predatory animal attacks on miners. | CBC News and Property Rights Research |
| Scott Langevin | 23 | ♂ | 2000-07-02 | Predatory | Vargas Island Provincial Park, British Columbia, Canada | An 18 member, guided kayaking group stopped for the night at a well-known, remote campsite on Ahous Bay. Previous tour groups at this site were reported to have played with and fed meal scraps to a wolf pack (a breeding pair and 5 juveniles). Both this 18 member party and recent park visitors noted that this pack was habituated to humans and was begging for food. This was at a time when deer numbers in this region (typical prey for a wolf pack this size) had declined to historically low numbers. Early in the morning of 2 July, some members of the party were forced to use a bear banger to scare away a wolf that wouldn't leave the campsite. At about 2 am, a wolf began dragging Langevin, who had been asleep in the open in a sleeping bag. The wolf had moved him several meters away from the campfire when he awoke, sat up, and shouted. The wolf stopped, stepped back, and attacked at the midsection, still encased in the sleeping bag. Langevin fought it with his hands and arms, and rolled back towards the fire pit. The wolf bit him on the back and head, leaving multiple lacerations and separating a part of his scalp from the skull before being chased away by a group of other campers. The attack lasted about five minutes. The man was transported to hospital in Victoria, where his scalp flap was reattached with 50 stitches, and wounds to his hands and back were treated. The two adult wolves were killed the next day and tested negative for rabies. The same wolves had earlier menaced several nature photographers. The stomach contents showed no sign of scavenging human food. A "Wolf Advisory" from the BC Ministry of the Environment (BC Parks) on 3 May 2016 warns that wolves in the vicinity of Vargas Island have learned to scavenge food by removing the hatch covers from kayaks. It recommends caching/hanging unattended food, never sleeping in the open and not bringing dogs to this destination. | The Globe and Mail |
| John Stenglein, logging camp resident | 6 | ♂ | 2000-04-26 | Predatory | Icy Bay, Alaska, U.S. | John and a 9-year-old boy were playing near the edge of a logging camp and 150 m from a mobile home. A wolf appeared, chased the boys, and attacked John when he fell. It then dragged him toward the woods. John was saved by his friend's Labrador Retriever, Willie. Adults arrived and drove the wolf away. John's father arrived and shot the wolf. The wolf had been radio-collared three years earlier. It was neither sick nor starving, having been habituated to the presence of people. John received at least 15 laceration and puncture wounds on the back, legs, and buttocks. The boy received stitches to close the wounds. Infection later set in and he was hospitalized, receiving intravenous antibiotics. | Canadian Field-Naturalist |
| Andy Greenblatt, Bush pilot | | ♂ | 1997, October | Prey-testing Agonistic charge | Joshua Green River Alaska, U.S. | Greenblatt was walking back to camp on a well-worn trail when he saw a wolf angling fast for a point ahead on the trail. When the wolf hit the trail it turned and ran directly at him, maintaining eye contact, ears forward. He yelled and waved his arms, and the wolf put its ears back but kept running and eye contact. At close range Andy was able to fire his weapon. The bullet missed, but the muzzle blast pushed the wolf off line, and the wolf missed. He swung the rifle and hit the wolf's skull; staggered, it ran off. Rabies was not suspected. | Alaska Department of Fish and Game |
| Zachariah Delventhal | 11 | ♂ | 1996, August | Predatory | Algonquin Provincial Park, Ontario, Canada | From the Congressional Record [Pages H7152-H7177]:-- "In August, 1996, the Delventhal family of Pittsburgh, Pennsylvania, were spending a nine-day family vacation in Algonquin and joined a group of Scouts in "howling'' at the wolves. They were answered by the howl of a solitary wolf. That night the Delventhals decided to sleep out under the stars. Young Zachariah was dreaming when he suddenly felt excruciating pain in his face. A lone wolf had bit him in the face and was dragging him from his sleeping bag. Zach screamed and Tracy, Zach's Mother, raced to his side and picked him up, saturating her thermal shirt with blood from Zach's wounds. The wolf stood menacingly less than a yard away. Tracy yelled at her husband, Thom, who leapt from his sleeping bag and charged the wolf. The wolf retreated and then charged at Tracy and Zach. The charges were repeated. Finally the wolf left. Thom turned a flashlight on 11-year-old Zach and saw, that the boy's face had been ripped open. His nose was crushed. Parts of his mouth and right cheek were torn and dangling. Blood gushed from puncture wounds below his eyes, and the lower part of his right ear was missing. Zach was taken to a hospital in Toronto where a plastic surgeon performed four hours of reconstructive surgery. Zach received more than 80 stitches in his face. Canadian officials baited the Delventhals' campsite, eventually capturing and killing a 60 lb (27 kg) wild male wolf. No further attacks have occurred since. (Cook, Kathy; "Night of the Wolf" READER'S DIGEST, July 1997, pp. 114–119.)"-- | |
| Tabitha Mullin | | ♀ | 1995, June | Agonistic | Ellesmere Island, Nunavut, Canada | A wildlife biologist, Mullin was standing about five paces outside her front door on the Park warden's base, observing and recording a pack of eleven wolves who approached and stopped inside 10 meters. One circled around closer, and she moved back toward the door. When she turned to open the door, the wolf grabbed and pulled her forearm. She pulled back, screamed, and her sleeves ripped. The wolf released, allowing her to get inside and shut the door, and the pack left. She suspected photographers had been luring the wolves in with food. She was uninjured. | Alaska Department of Fish and Game |
| Park visitors | | | 1987–1998 | | Algonquin Provincial Park, Ontario, Canada | Five incidents, all of which were preceded by extensive habituation. At first, the incidents were minor. Years later, wolves began stalking children in a predatory fashion. In the first incident, in 1987, a sixteen-year-old girl was only briefly bitten. The attack was classified as "disciplinary", as the girl had shined a torch light into the wolf's eyes at close range just before it attacked. On 4 August 1994, a 9-year old boy received a single puncture wound and on 1 September an adult woman was bitten once on the leg. In 1996 a wolf dragged a sleeping bag 2 meters with a 12-year old boy inside. The boy received a broken nose and 6 lacerations on his face that required 80 stitches. The wolf had visited several campsites in previous weeks and tried to grab clothing and equipment. The wolf may have bitten additional people. On 4 September 1998, a wolf that had been visiting campsites and had attacked three dogs earlier in the summer, approached and circled a family with a 4-year-old girl. The father used pepper spray on the wolf and carried his daughter to the car. The next day the wolf attacked a fourth dog. On 27 September the wolf approached a family having a picnic. It grabbed and tossed a nineteen-month-old boy 1 meter. The boy was saved by his parents, but required two stitches. The wolf was shot that afternoon. It was a healthy male with stomach contents scavenged from camps. In all cases, the wolves were killed, and rabies tests were negative. | Alaska Department of Fish and Game |
| Robert Mulders, Biologist | | ♂ | 1985-12-13 | Prey-testing Agonistic | Whale Cove, Nunavut, Canada | Two biologists netted a caribou from a helicopter and landed to perform tests and attach a radio collar. While working near the running blades of the helicopter, Mulders saw a young wolf approaching. Both men stood, shouted, and waved their arms. When Mulders stepped toward the wolf, it tried to circle around the men to get to the caribou, then rushed in and bit down on Mulders' lower leg and would not let go despite repeated punches by Mulders for 10–15 seconds until the other biologist, Mark Williams, knocked the wolf unconscious with the caribou radio collar. Mulders then took the collar and struck the wolf in the head twice and stabbed it in the chest with a knife. The bite tore open his pants but left only a small wound. It was thought that the wolf may be inexperienced because of its young age. | Alaska Department of Fish and Game |
| Christopher Nimitz | 2 | ♂ | 1985-10-18 | Captive | Idyllwild, California, US | His family's captive wolf pulled his arm into the cage and severed it. His mother saved him but was arrested for child endangerment. | Los Angeles Times |
| Hunter | 19 | ♂ | 1982, January | Predatory | Near Duluth, Minnesota, U.S. | The hunter was attacked, the wolf unseen under thick cover. Knocked down, the pair rolled on the ground, where he was able to keep it away by grabbing its throat. He could not aim but managed to discharge his weapon, and the wolf fled at the sound. The hunter received claw wounds to the thigh. | Alaska Department of Fish and Game |
| Dr. M. Dawson, Paleontologist | | ♀ | 1977-06-28 | Prey-testing agonistic charge | Ellesmere Island, Nunavut, Canada | The pair were doing field work when they were approached by a pack of six wolves. They tried to drive them off by shouting, waving, and throwing clods of frozen dirt. The wolves were not deterred, and began to circle. The lead wolf leaped at Dawson's face, but Dawson pushed back with her arms and leaned backwards, pushing the wolf to the ground before it could bite her, and the wolves departed, but the strike was close enough for saliva from the wolf's flews to be left on her cheek. Munthe and Hutchinson (1978) interpreted the attack as testing of unfamiliar prey, but noted they didn't know if the wolves had encountered people before. McNay notes that the attack resembled others by wolves which had been fed. | Alaska Department of Fish and Game |
| David Lawrence | 7 | ♂ | 1976, Summer | Prey-testing agonistic charge | Salcha River, Alaska, US | While his father, Roy Lawrence, stood near the plane talking to the pilot, Ed Gelvin, Roy saw a wolf charging focused directly at his son, David, who was crouching down to touch the water's edge about 30m/33yards away. The moment Roy saw the wolf charging, it was 50m/55.5 yards from David and moving fast. Roy shouted for David to hide in the brush. When the wolf lost sight of him, it stopped, hopped, and stood on its hind legs trying to sight the boy again, allowing Gelvin time to ready his weapon and fire. It was a young adult, underweight female, weighing 70.5 lb (32.0 kg) | Alaska Department of Fish and Game |
| Dr. Bob Piorkowski, Alaska Fish and Game, and his wife | | ♂ /♀ | 1975, October | Prey-testing agonistic charge | Tonzona River, Alaska, US, near Denali National Park | They went outside their remote house near Denali National Park to see why their dog was barking, hoping it was a moose they could hunt. Five wolves came running straight at them, not at the dog, which was more than five meters away. Piorkowski was not ready to fire until the lead wolf was at point-blank range. He shot the next at ten meters away. Both wolves were dead, and the rest fled. Both wolves tested negative for rabies, and Piorkowski had one pelt mounted. | Alaska Department of Fish and Game |
| Infant | 1 | ♀ | 1975, Fall | Captive | New Jersey | While the infant was posing for a picture with the wolf at a charity event for the Fund for Animals, it bit the side of her face, ripping it open. She was hospitalized and given plastic surgery. | Field and Stream |
| Pipeline workers | | ♂ | 1971–1979 | | Along the right-of-way for the Trans-Alaska Pipeline, from Prudhoe Bay to Valdez, Alaska, US | Amongst the bitten workers, there were ten "bites and charges", including a seriously bitten forearm. Causes included: a lack of trapping and hunting in certain areas, a lack of barriers such as fencing, unsecured attractants such as trash, human attitudes and behaviors such as intentional feeding, and mutual habituation. | |
| Alex Lamont | Adult | ♂ | 1969, Summer | Prey-testing agonistic charge | Near Wien Lake, Alaska, US | Lamont saw two wolves running directly at him while walking home. He shot both after one of them bit his leg. | Alaska Department of Fish and Game |
| Thomas Hamilton | Adult | ♂ | 1950 | Prey-testing agonistic charge | Lower Foster Lake, Saskatchewan, Canada | While out hunting wolves, he laid down to aim his rifle, when the wolves arose and started running at him. He waited for a better shot, expecting the pack to stop, but they did not. He shot the lead wolf at point-blank range, prompting the rest to depart. | Alaska Department of Fish and Game |
| Inuk hunter | Adult | | 1945 | Rabid | Anaktuvuk Pass, Alaska | A rabid wolf attacked an Inuk hunter. | Alaska Department of Fish and Game |
| Zacarias Hugo | 14 | ♂ | 1943 | Possibly rabid | Etivluk River, Alaska, US | While hunting caribou, Zacarias heard a sound, turned and saw a large black wolf coming for him. It knocked him down and bit his arm, so he could not use his rifle. It bit his legs, back, arm and neck and dragged him 18 metres before abandoning the attack and disappearing. He walked back to camp, but had lost a lot of blood, mostly from his forearm. His caribou skin Anorak protected him from greater injury or even death, but may have contributed to the attack if it caused the wolf to mistake him for a caribou. This attack had long been classified as "rabid" because it occurred during an epizootic of the disease in that area and because Zac's father, Inualuruk, tracked the wolf and observed to have been walking at times in the splayed manner of a sick animal. However, the facts that the attack was abandoned in the way it was and that Zacarias never developed the disease are not consistent with rabies. | Alaska Department of Fish and Game |
| Mike Dusiak, Railwayman | Adult | ♂ | 1942-12-29 | Possibly rabid | Poulin, Ontario, Canada | He was riding a small rail vehicle called a speeder when a wolf leaped at him and bit his sleeve, knocking him down and knocking the vehicle off the track. Dusiak kept the wolf at bay for more than 25 minutes with an ax. He managed to hit the wolf repeatedly but not squarely enough. The wolf was not deterred by an approaching train that stopped to help Dusiak. Several railwaymen came running, but the wolf would not retreat. The men killed the wolf with picks and shovels. The carcass was inspected by a biologist, and it appeared healthy. However, Rutter and Pimlot reviewed the case in 1968 and concluded that it must have been rabid because of the sustained and determined nature of the attack. | |
| Dr. Charles R. Krueger and party | Adult and unknown others | ♂ and unknown others | 1919-07-22 | n/a | 80 mi (130 km) east of Flagstaff, AZ along the transcontinental highway, which was the National Old Trails Road that later became Route 66 | Dr. Krueger and his party were driving from Chicago to California and were stranded by a cloudburst. They made camp by the side of the road and were attacked by at least 8 wolves. They shot and killed three, and wounded five others before driving the band off. | |
| Lucy Ballard | 12 | ♀ | 1917, February | n/a | Benton center near Penn Yan near Rochester, New York | A "starving" 80 lb (36 kg) wolf attacked Lucy as she was walking down a lonely point in a road. She screamed, hit it with her purse and ran. A neighbor, Adam Babcock heard the screams and when he appeared the wolf ran into the woods. An alarm was sounded and the villagers hunted the wolf down and killed it. | |
| Donald Baxter MacMillan and members of Crocker Land Expedition | Adults | ♂ and ♀ | 1914-03-31 | n/a | western Arctic region | MacMillan's party, traveling by dog sled, was approached and chased by 12 wolves. They stopped, turned around to face the wolves, shouted, threatened and snapped whips while restraining their own very excited dogs. The lead wolf stopped, surveyed them "critically for an instant," and then retreated with the rest of the pack following. By the time MacMillan and his men had their rifles uncovered the wolves were out of range. | |
| Arvid Anderson | Adult | ♂ | 1913 | n/a | Silver Creek district near Ishpeming, Michigan | Anderson was returning from a day of hunting when a pack of wolves came up on him and one after the other came running toward him. To slow their pursuit he began to drop the contents of his game bag as he ran away from them. He had only five rounds of ammo left. When he got some distance he turned and fired all five rounds into the pack, and the wolves came after him again. He threw away his gun and ran and climbed the nearest tree. Looking down, he counted 27 wolves. The wolves circled the tree trying to nip him until after midnight, although after the second hour they seemed less enthusiastic. Anderson fell asleep and eventually fell out of the tree. It was daylight and the wolves had gone. Uninjured, he went home. | The Day Book (Chicago, IL) |
| Albert, a hunting guide | Adult | ♂ | 1909 | n/a | Tuya Range of the Cassiar Mountains in British Columbia | As Albert sat alone at a campfire while his client and crew were off clearing wood for a trail, he suddenly saw a wolf standing next to him. Immediately the wolf attacked him on the shoulder. Albert beat the wolf off with a burning log from the fire. After a sharp crack on the head, the wolf slunk away. | |
| Emilio Sirtori (driver) and Antonio Scarfoglio (journalist) | Adults | ♂ | 1908-03-24 | n/a | near Spring Valley, Wyoming | The two Italian men were competing in the 1908 New York to Paris Race, driving a Zust. Along a muddy stretch of road, they heard wolf howls and a pack of wolves surrounded them. Tooting the horn and other nonlethal measures proved ineffective. When the wolves began nipping the vehicle's tires, the men shot several of them dead with a pistol and a rifle. | |
| Art Gillman | n/a | ♂ | 1905-01-09 | n/a | On Pigeon Lake, near Dassel, Minnesota | Gillman reported that he had heard the wolf attacking from behind, spun, and struck it in the head with his walking stick squarely enough to give him time to brandish his knife. At the wolf's second lunge, he stabbed it in the chest deeply enough to cause the wolf to run away. Gillman reported enough wolf blood to assume the animal probably soon died. | |
| Josiah Gregg | Adult | ♂ | 1900 (circa) | n/a | Missouri border | Gregg was riding horseback when a very large and apparently famished wolf approached. Gregg picked up a cudgel and charged the wolf. The wolf did not flee. The cudgel broke over the wolf's head. The wolf then attacked the horse's legs. The horse threw Gregg off and ran away. The wolf charged Gregg again. Gregg used his large black hat as a shield, thrusting it at the wolf's mouth. The wolf turned around and trotted off, allowing Gregg to make his escape. | |
| David Tobuk | Toddler | ♂ | 1900 | Predatory | Koyukuk River, Alaska, US | In the 1920s, Tobuk was a Native Alaskan steamboat captain who bore severe scarring as a result of a wolf attack he had suffered as a toddler. He was playing along the riverbank when a wolf appeared out of some bushes, seized Tobuk by the head, lifted and ran off with him in its jaws. The wolf was then shot by a nearby man. | |
| Arctic explorer | Adult | ♂ | 1900 | n/a | Axel Heiberg Island | While on the trail, wolves attacked team member of expedition led by Otto Sverdrup. The man defended himself with a ski. Wolves had previously been entering their camps and killing sled dogs. | |
| Two sawyers and one teamster | Adult | ♂ | 1885, March | n/a | between Joseph Moses's logging camp on Jump River and Chippewa Falls, Wisconsin | The three men were transporting a dead man's body around midnight when they were attacked by wolves. The teamster plied the whip on his team and the sawyers shot and killed 27 wolves. | The St. Johns Herald |
| Sheep farmer | Adult | ♂ | 1881, November | n/a | near Dayton, Wisconsin | The farmer saw a pack of seven wolves devouring a dead sheep. Wolves had recently been taking a toll on local flocks. He fired a gunshot into the pack, and the seven wolves turned and attacked him before he could climb a tree. He turned the gun around and clubbed one to death, which the rest immediately devoured. He killed one wolf at a time and kept this up for about one hour until the entire pack was dead. He kept enough of the remains to claim the $11 per head bounty offered by Waupaca County. | |
| Daughter of a frontiersman named "Baker" | 18 | ♀ | 1881, Summer | Defending cows | Northwestern Colorado, US | The woman encountered a wolf resting on a hill while on her way to bring in cows at dusk. The animal attacked her after she shouted and threw rocks to scare it away. It seized her by the shoulder, threw her to the ground, and badly bit her arms and legs before being shot by her brother. | George Bird Grinnell |
| Postmaster Charles Kootz | Adult | ♂ | 1875, Late May | n/a | 1 mi (1.6 km) from Bradshaw City, Arizona (near Prescott) | Four large wolves attacked Mr. Kootz. It is unclear whether he was delivering mail or working his own farm field at the time of the attack. He whipped and drove the wolves away with a shovel. | Arizona Weekly Miner |
| 2 men, one named Frank | Adult | ♂ | 1869-12-23 | n/a | Northern Minnesota | The two men had skated 2 mi (3.2 km) up a frozen river by moonlight, stopped to pick berries and two wolves came after them. They returned to the river and skated quickly back towards home but the two wolves gave chase on the ice. Arriving back near the house, they called out to a family member that had just stepped outside. He tossed rifles to them and they turned around and killed both wolves. | The Arizona Sentinel |
| Mail carrier | Adult | ♂ | 1861-01-17 | n/a | 45 mi (72 km) outside Baltimore, Maryland on Decatur-Baltimore route | A mounted mail carrier was chased by a very large pack of wolves stated to be near one hundred, climbed a tree and waited them out until the next morning. He suffered from elemental exposure and was carried home by the people who found him. His horse was not found again. | |
| Mr. Mitchell | Adult | ♂ | 1857, November | n/a | 20 mi (32 km) outside Bangor, Maine | A dozen wolves fiercely attacked the team pulling a mail wagon. The driver, Mr. Mitchell, ended the pursuit by firing shots from his rifle into the pack. | |
| 5 unidentified persons | unknown | unknown | 1857, July and August | Rabid | near present-day Green Valley, Arizona | Rabid wolves were entering camps, towns and even homes where the doors were open. Six people were bitten, one was severely mangled and one died. | |
| 2 fur trappers working with Alexander Ross (fur trader) | Adult | ♂ | 1855 (circa) | n/a | drainage of Columbia River | 17 wolves forced the two men up a tree for several hours. The men shot two of the wolves before reaching the tree, but instead of dispersing, the remaining wolves kept pursuing them. | |
| Stephen Court, master of HMS Investigator on McClure Arctic Expedition | Adult | ♂ | 1853-03-28 | n/a | Mercy Bay in what is now Aulavik National Park | Mr. Court was out shooting. Two wolves gradually closed in on him, one keeping in front and the other behind. Court shouted, waved his arms and ran at them, yet the wolves continued to move in. He fired on one at 60 ft (18 m) and struck it in the throat but the wolf nevertheless closed its distance to within 9 ft (2.7 m) of him before he was able to reload his single barrel gun and kill it. | Sir Robert John Le Mesurier McClure |
| Phil Jenkins | Adult | ♂ | 1848 | n/a | Newcastle, IA now Webster City, Iowa | A dozen or so young adults were harvesting syrup from "sugarbushes." One couple, Jack and Cinda, were late in arriving back at the main camp and was trapped on a log bridge over a creek by pack of wolves. Jack fired his rifle into the wolf pack and the other men armed themselves to rescue the couple. Phil Jenkins fired a shot at a wolf and ran back into the firelight to reload. As soon as he again left the firelight a wolf attacked and lacerated his flesh. The women who had been staying in the safety of the firelight attacked the wolf with firebrands and rescued Jenkins. Thirteen wolves were killed before Jack and Cinda were freed. Jack killed four of the wolves within 12 ft (3.7 m) of the log bridge. Local wolves recently had killed several pigs and a "fine yearling calf." | |
| William Jackson | Adult | ♂ | 1846, August | n/a | Canada | Jackson was hunting in the woods and was attacked by 3 wolves. He backed up against a tree, shot two dead and killed the third after a "savage conflict." | |
| Two members of Lewis and Clark Expedition | Adult | ♂ | 1805 | n/a | Upper Missouri River | A wolf crept into camp and seized a sleeper's hand. When driven off, it attacked a second man and was later shot by a third. | |
| Daniel Boone and Nathaniel Gist | Adult | ♂ | 1761, late autumn | n/a | Wolf Hills, Valley of the Holston River, near Black's Fort at Abingdon, Virginia | Boone and Gist were both serving under Hugh Waddell (general). They temporarily detached themselves from Waddell's command to lead a small party on a "long hunt." While camped at the site of Black's Fort which was subsequently built, a pack of wolves "violently assailed" them. They had considerable difficulty beating off the wolves. This incident caused the locality to be called the Wolf Hills (now Abingdon, VA). | |

== See also ==
- List of wolf attacks

Species:

- Coyote attacks on humans
- Fatal dog attacks in the United States
- List of fatal bear attacks in North America
- List of fatal cougar attacks in North America

== Bibliography ==
- Linnell J, Andersen R, Andersone Z, Balciauskas L, Blanco JC, Boitani L, Brainerd S, Breitenmoser U, Kojola I, Liberg O, Loe J, Okarma H, Pedersen HC, Promberger C, Sand H, Solberg EJ, Valdmann H, Wabakken P (2002). The Fear of Wolves: A Review of Wolf Attacks on Humans (PDF). NINA. ISBN 82-426-1292-7. Archived from the original (PDF) on 9 November 2013.
- Lopez, Barry H. (1978). Of Wolves and Men. J. M. Dent and Sons Limited. ISBN 0-7432-4936-4.
- Marvin, Garry (2012). Wolf. Reaktion Books Ltd. ISBN 978-1-86189-879-1.
- Mech, L. David (1981). The Wolf: The Ecology and Behaviour of an Endangered Species. University of Minnesota Press. ISBN 0-8166-1026-6.
- Mech, L. David; Boitani, Luigi (2003). Wolves: Behaviour, Ecology and Conservation. University of Chicago Press. ISBN 0-226-51696-2.
- Porter, J. Hampden (1894). Wild Beasts: A Study Of The Characters And Habits Of The Elephant, Lion, Leopard, Panther, Jaguar, Tiger, Puma, Wolf, And Grizzly Bear. Charles Scribner's Sons. LCCN 04024919.
- Young, Stanley P.; Goldman, Edward A. (1944). The Wolves of North America. Dover. LCCN 64-15510.
