= Cigar Lake mine =

Uranium mine in Saskatchewan, Canada

- Cigar Lake uranium mine, Northern Saskatchewan, Canada

- Location in Saskatchewan
- Location: Athabasca Basin, Saskatchewan, Canada; 58°04′07″N 104°32′26″W
- Products: triuranium octoxide (U_{3}O_{8})
- Production: 19.1 million lb
- Financial year: 2025
- Discovered: 1981
- Opened: 2014
- Company: Cameco (57.418%); Orano (42.582%)
- Website: Official site

The Cigar Lake Mine is a large high-grade underground uranium mine, located in the uranium-rich Athabasca Basin of northern Saskatchewan, Canada, at the south-west corner of Waterbury Lake. The deposit, discovered in 1981, is second in size of high-grade deposits only to the nearby McArthur River mine. Other deposits, such as the Olympic Dam mine in Australia, contain more uranium but at lower grades.

== History ==
Full-scale construction began in 2005 with production originally planned for 2007, but the mine experienced a catastrophic water inflow in October 2006, which flooded the mine. A second inflow occurred in 2008 during the first attempt at dewatering the mine after sealing the initial inflow. Remediation efforts continued, and re-entry was successfully accomplished in 2010. Production was delayed several times with the startup dates being announced for 2011, 2013, and 2014.

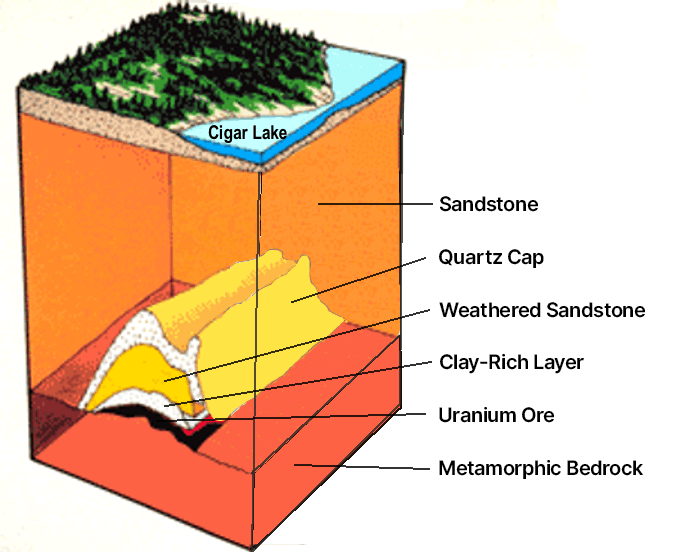
Cutaway diagram of the Cigar Lake uranium deposit, showing the layers of rock surrounding the uranium ore

On 13 March 2014, ore production began at the mine, with the mining system and underground processing circuits operational and uranium ore transported to the McClean Lake mill operated by AREVA Resources Canada located 70 km (43 mi) northeast of the minesite.

The deposit is located at depth of 450 m (1,480 ft), surrounded by and isolated within a layer of water-impermeable illite-chlorite clay, within the Athabasca Sandstone formation. Its age is estimated to be 1.3 billion years. Due to natural containment and lack of any traces of radioactive elements on the surface, the deposit is used as an example of an effective natural deep geological repository.

During 2020, production was temporarily suspended over two periods due to the risks posed by the COVID-19 pandemic: from March until September; and then from 14 December 2020. Production at Orano's McClean Lake uranium mill, which processes the ore from the Cigar Lake mine, was also suspended.

The Canadian Nuclear Safety Commission took regulatory action against owners Cameco in October 2022 due to the volume of waste material placed on waste pile C.

Cigar Lake Airport, which services the mine, is located 1 nautical mile (1.9 km; 1.2 mi) southwest of Waterbury Lake.

== Reserves and resources ==
As of 31 December 2020, Cigar Lake had proven and probable reserves of 75,100 t (165.5×10^{6} lb) of triuranium octoxide (U_{3}O_{8}) at an average grade of 15.92%, for 75,070 t (170×10^{6} lb) of U_{3}O_{8}, and a measured and indicated resource of 47,500 t (104.7×10^{6} lb) of U_{3}O_{8} at an average grade of 13.88%, for 47,514 tonnes of U_{3}O_{8}.

== Ownership ==
The mine is owned by Cameco Corporation (57.418%) and Orano Canada Inc. (42.582%). Cameco is the project operator.

== Wolf attacks ==
On 8 November 2005, in what is the first recorded wolf attack in North America in the 21st century, Kenton Joel Carnegie, a 22-year-old Canadian geological engineering student from Ontario on a work term from the University of Waterloo, was killed by wolves at Points North Landing, near Cameco's Rabbit Lake mine.

On 29 August 2016, a 26-year-old shift worker walking between buildings at the Cigar Lake mine on his midnight break was attacked and mauled by a lone timber wolf. A nearby security guard frightened the wolf away, administered first aid, and called for an air ambulance which medevaced him 675 km (419 mi) to a hospital in Saskatoon where he recovered. After the attack, authorities ordered that area wolves be shot, that food disposal systems and fencing be inspected, and that staff be educated.

== Climate ==

Climate data for Cigar Lake Climate ID: 4061570; coordinates 58°05′N 104°29′W; elevation: 467.0 m (1,532.2 ft); 1981–2010 normals
Month	Jan	Feb	Mar	Apr	May	Jun	Jul	Aug	Sep	Oct	Nov	Dec	Year
Record high °C (°F)	8.0 (46.4)	8.5 (47.3)	14.0 (57.2)	22.5 (72.5)	31.0 (87.8)	36.0 (96.8)	34.0 (93.2)	37.0 (98.6)	29.0 (84.2)	22.0 (71.6)	7.0 (44.6)	4.5 (40.1)	37.0 (98.6)
Mean daily maximum °C (°F)	−18.6 (−1.5)	−14.3 (6.3)	−6.3 (20.7)	3.6 (38.5)	11.5 (52.7)	19.1 (66.4)	22.2 (72.0)	19.6 (67.3)	11.9 (53.4)	2.4 (36.3)	−8.3 (17.1)	−15.3 (4.5)	2.3 (36.1)
Daily mean °C (°F)	−23.6 (−10.5)	−20.4 (−4.7)	−13.9 (7.0)	−3.6 (25.5)	4.9 (40.8)	12.5 (54.5)	15.8 (60.4)	13.7 (56.7)	7.1 (44.8)	−1.3 (29.7)	−12.3 (9.9)	−20.1 (−4.2)	−3.4 (25.9)
Mean daily minimum °C (°F)	−28.6 (−19.5)	−26.4 (−15.5)	−21.4 (−6.5)	−10.8 (12.6)	−1.7 (28.9)	5.8 (42.4)	9.5 (49.1)	7.8 (46.0)	2.2 (36.0)	−4.9 (23.2)	−16.2 (2.8)	−24.8 (−12.6)	−9.1 (15.6)
Record low °C (°F)	−50.5 (−58.9)	−43.0 (−45.4)	−44.0 (−47.2)	−33.0 (−27.4)	−19.0 (−2.2)	−5.0 (23.0)	−1.0 (30.2)	−2.0 (28.4)	−8.0 (17.6)	−24.5 (−12.1)	−40.0 (−40.0)	−47.0 (−52.6)	−50.5 (−58.9)
Average precipitation mm (inches)	24.2 (0.95)	21.3 (0.84)	19.1 (0.75)	15.4 (0.61)	33.1 (1.30)	59.5 (2.34)	87.1 (3.43)	77.4 (3.05)	63.8 (2.51)	36.6 (1.44)	37.7 (1.48)	22.5 (0.89)	497.5 (19.59)
Average rainfall mm (inches)	0.0 (0.0)	0.1 (0.00)	0.1 (0.00)	4.7 (0.19)	26.6 (1.05)	59.5 (2.34)	87.1 (3.43)	77.4 (3.05)	61.5 (2.42)	10.4 (0.41)	0.1 (0.00)	0.0 (0.0)	327.3 (12.89)
Average snowfall cm (inches)	24.2 (9.5)	21.2 (8.3)	19.0 (7.5)	10.7 (4.2)	6.5 (2.6)	0.0 (0.0)	0.0 (0.0)	0.0 (0.0)	2.3 (0.9)	26.1 (10.3)	37.6 (14.8)	22.5 (8.9)	170.1 (67.0)
Average precipitation days (≥ 0.2 mm)	8.0	7.7	7.1	4.7	8.2	12.0	16.1	17.1	15.4	11.8	12.6	8.3	128.8
Average rainy days (≥ 0.2 mm)	0.0	0.05	0.11	1.0	7.0	12.0	16.1	17.1	14.9	4.5	0.1	0.05	72.9
Average snowy days (≥ 0.2 cm)	8.0	7.7	7.0	3.8	1.3	0.0	0.0	0.0	0.9	7.5	12.6	8.2	56.9
Source: Environment and Climate Change Canada

== See also ==
- Uranium market
- Unconformity uranium deposits
- Uranium compounds
- Cluff Lake mine
- Key Lake mine
- List of wolf attacks in North America
- List of mines in Saskatchewan
