= Death of Kenton Joel Carnegie =

2005 fatal wolf attack in Canada

Kenton Joel Carnegie
- Born: 11 February 1983; Ajax, Ontario, Canada
- Died: 8 November 2005 (aged 22); Points North Landing, Saskatchewan, Canada
- Resting place: Thornton Cemetery in Oshawa, Ontario, Canada

Kenton Joel Carnegie (11 February 1983 – 8 November 2005) was a 22-year-old Canadian geological engineering student from Ontario on a work term from the University of Waterloo who died in a wild animal attack while he was walking near Points North Landing in Saskatchewan, Canada. According to a trucker who said he met Carnegie in the cafeteria a few days before his death, he had passed around close-range photographs of large wolf pups that had approached him during walks in nearby woods, and been warned by the trucker that such encounters were extremely dangerous. A bush pilot said he warned Carnegie about an incident in which adult wolves had menaced others walking outside the camp. However, Carnegie's family said he would not have taken risks if warned. After reviewing evidence, which included wolf tracks left around the body, the finding of a coroner's inquest was that Carnegie had been killed by wolves.

== Fatal attack ==
=== Background ===
Points North Landing, in the province of Saskatchewan, is a service centre for uranium mines. Prior to the attack on Carnegie, timber wolves and black bears had fed on camp refuse and were seen nearby. Ten months prior to Carnegie's death, a lone wolf attacked a 55-year-old uranium miner named Fred Desjarlais who was jogging home from work in Key Lake. He wrestled with it until a busload of his colleagues arrived to rescue him by frightening the wolf away. They subsequently took Desjarlais to a nearby medical facility. A few hours later, Key Lake Airport's medical workers airlifted Desjarlais to Saskatoon's Royal University Hospital where he had a series of rabies treatments. After the assault on Desjarlais, Cameco built an electric fence around Key Lake's landfill to prevent further predatory animal assaults on miners. Authorities hunted and shot the wolf that attacked Desjarlais. They tested the wolf's body for rabies, but the test was negative.

On 4 November 2005, one naturalist who reviewed photographs taken during an incident in which wolves were believed to have menaced two walkers other than Carnegie, said it appeared to be consistent with animals having a food-conditioned lack of fear in proximity to humans. It was suggested that one wolf's posture indicated it was aroused and capable of an attack. Another expert disputed the characterisation of the wolf's attitude.

The site in Points North Landing, Saskatchewan, where Carnegie's body was discovered

=== Death ===
Carnegie was on his autumn cooperative term in his third year of geological engineering studies at the University of Waterloo. He and a colleague were in the Athabasca Basin performing airborne surveying work for Ottawa-based Sander Geophysics. Carnegie told colleagues he was going for a walk. According to official statements made to RCMP, he was "implored" not to go. His family says that Carnegie was known to be interested in the geology around the lake, and he had been given permission.

Kenton asked and received approval from his supervisor to go for that last walk alone. Kenton was not a risk taker, had plans for his future and never would have taken that walk if he realized any potential danger.

— Kim Carnegie, 2008

On 8 November, at 5:30 PM, Carnegie left, saying to geophysicist Chris Van Galder that he would return by 7:00 for supper. His bush pilot, Todd Svarckopf, warned him not to walk in the snow and invited him to play hockey in the airport's hangar instead, but Carnegie disregarded the warning. He went for a walk in the snow but did not return to the surveyor camp. At 7:30, a search was mounted. The camp's co-owner, Mark Eikel, drove out in a truck with Van Galder and Svarckopf searching for him. Carnegie's tracks were followed to the lakeshore. Upon noticing wolf tracks on the shore, the three searchers went back for a rifle before continuing. Carnegie's body was found a little further on, but there were no wolves in sight at that time. Using a flashlight, the body was viewed from about 10 m (32 ft), and many wolf tracks were visible around the body. Later, when the body was being recovered, two sets of eyes were seen glowing in the dark close by. In addition, party searchers heard a wolf pack howling in the camp's vicinity.

Rosalie Tsannie-Burseth, the province's local coroner, who had arranged the removal of Carnegie's body, gave a hypothetical reconstruction of what happened. Her reconstruction was based on tracks of people and animals she observed near the site of the attack the day after the event occurred. She speculated that Carnegie had walked from the camp and by the time he was a kilometer away a wolf had begun following his tracks. One wolf stalked Carnegie from the forest and another stalked him from the lake. Boot prints in the snow showed that Carnegie quickened his pace as two more wolves approached him from the sides. The first apparent struggle occurred 2.2 metres (7 ft) from where the chase began. Four more scuffle sites were found leading to where his body was discovered. Tsannie-Burseth believed that Carnegie probably fought hard before finally succumbing.

Before Carnegie's death, there had been at least one verified case of a fatal wolf attack on a person in North America, namely Canada, where Patricia Wyman died on 18 April 1996. In contrast, more than 300 occurrences of black bears behaving aggressively toward humans have been documented in the province, including three fatal attacks. The main evidence against a bear attack was that Carnegie's body was surrounded by the tracks of wolves, while no bear tracks were found near his body.

Carnegie's interment was at Thornton Cemetery in Oshawa, Ontario.

=== Official investigation ===
Lacking an eyewitness account, all we know for certain is that Carnegie's body was found on a lakeside trail near Points North Landing, a northern outpost with an airstrip. A large predator had scavenged him. We conclude from circumstantial evidence that Carnegie’s death was not a homicide as no indications of foul play were found at the scene of the accident. Moreover, we concur with the autopsy and forensic reports, which state unequivocally that no other signs, injuries, or cause of death, were observed other then [sic] those consistent with an animal attack. The type of wounds and feeding pattern confirm predation as the probable cause of death. Most likely, Carnegie was surprised by a violent predacious assault and sustained fatal wounds at an early stage during the attack..

— Paquet & Walker 2006

The RCMP determined that Carnegie's death was not the result of a homicide. The official Government of Saskatchewan investigation was headed by internationally renowned carnivore biologist and behavioral ecologist Dr. Paul Paquet and RCMP forensic anthropologist Dr. Ernest Walker, who oversaw Carnegie's autopsy, which was performed by Dr. N. Brits in Prince Albert, Saskatchewan. Brits stated that Carnegie's injuries were consistent with those expected in a predatory animal attack. Paquet and Walker concluded that the only likely candidates were wolves and black bears, as coyotes, grizzly bears, and pumas were not known to frequent the Points North Landing area. The report, however, was equivocal as to which predator was responsible, noting that most of the evidence, all of which was circumstantial, was unavoidably confounded by search and recovery efforts. Conservation Officers who investigated the accident site two days after the event and several snowfalls wrote in their report "Officers investigated the site and found numerous wolf tracks in the area. No other large animal tracks could be found." Bears had not been sighted at Points North Camp for over a month, and the death occurred during what some suggest is their annual hibernation cycle.

=== Other opinion ===
It is unusual for wolves, and typical for bears, to drag the carcass of a prey animal in the way Carnegie's body was dragged. Among the photographed injuries present on the body was a bite mark on the right side of Carnegie's right lower leg, which some authorities considered consistent with the wolf bite marks researchers commonly observe on ungulate prey carcasses. Paquet and Walker identified the mark as occurring postmortem and as being indistinguishable from those left by black bears.

A naturalist retained by the Carnegie family reviewed accounts of 80 events in Alaska and Canada where wolves closely approached or attacked people and found 39 cases of aggression by apparently healthy wolves and 29 cases of fearless behavior by non-aggressive wolves. After examining photographs of Carnegie's body and the area around it, a naturalist concluded that the argument in favour of a bear culprit was weak: many black bears may have been hibernating, an active bear would have concentrated on an ample food supply from the nearby landfill 2 km from the kill site, and none of the camp employees saw bears or bear tracks, either the month before or after the attack occurred. A bruise on Carnegie's right lower leg (measured 4 × 2.5 cm), accompanied by what appeared to be bite mark impressions associated with the bruising, was said to be consistent with injuries observed in 13 survivors of wolf attacks in Alaska and Canada. In many of these cases, the initial bites were fleeting and occurred in the hands or legs, and left only torn clothing, scratched skin, or minor puncture wounds. A photo featuring the injured lower back of a six-year-old Alaskan boy attacked by a wolf near Icy Bay showed bite marks ½–3 cm in length, many of which were similar to those found near the nose, eyes, and right arm of Carnegie's body.

Constable Noey noted that Mr. Carnegie's tracks reversed course from the lake, the tracks moved up the trail a short distance and then there was a large disturbance in the snow as if something rolled in the snow. That may have been where Mr. Carnegie was first attacked and possibly bitten in the leg or shin early in the encounter. Beyond the disturbed snow in the trail, Kenton’s track breaks into a run and ventures off the trail into the surrounding muskeg and forest. At that point he was being pursued, or possibly the act of running stimulated the pursuit. Then there is a lot of blood in the snow, both drops and pooled blood. Constable Noey said it appears Carnegie stood at that point for some time because Kenton’s wide-stanced footprints straddled a large amount of blood on the vegetation and on the ground. That sequence is exactly what we would expect with a wolf attack, i.e., initial attack, pursuit, wounding bites inflicted, then a retreat of the wolves while the prey is weakened by blood loss. The drops and undisturbed pooling of blood do not suggest a bear attack where the bear would maintain constant contact with its prey and overpower it with physical force.

— "A Review of Evidence and Findings Related to the Death of Kenton Carnegie on 8 November 2005 Near Points North, Saskatchewan" by Mark E. McNay, Alaska Department of Fish and Game Fairbanks, Alaska, 25 May 2007

However, as Carnegie was their first human victim, it would have been impossible to extrapolate normal, specific feeding behaviours. A reconstruction of the attack suggested that Carnegie repeatedly broke free and struggled to his feet after being taken down. In contrast to this repeated breaking free during a wolf attack, bears are adept at pinning prey.

=== Inquest ===
The Chief Coroner's confidential investigative report was completed in the summer of 2006 and given to the Carnegie family for review. The report determined that Carnegie was killed by either wolves or a black bear, and that the poorly conducted initial investigation and uncertainty of circumstantial evidence precluded a definitive conclusion. An inquest date of February 2007 was then called by the Chief Coroner, but was rescheduled for 29 October 2007.

The Province of Saskatchewan chose not to present an affirmative case supporting the findings of the Chief Coroner. Accordingly, the lawyer representing the crown did not carry out in-depth examinations of witnesses. Further, judicial inquests in Saskatchewan apply a much lower standard for determining cause of death (balance of probabilities or 51%) than do determinations by the Chief Coroner (reasonable doubt or 95%). On 1 November 2007, following three days of testimony and examination of photographs of Carnegie's body and the site of the incident, a six-member jury concluded that wolves were responsible for Carnegie's death.

== Aftermath ==
A scholarship fund at the University of Waterloo was established as a memorial. Dr. L. David Mech, an internationally recognized wolf expert, stated; "Mr. Carnegie's death is a terrible tragedy but one fatal wolf attack in the recorded history of North America does not warrant widespread alarm".

According to Carnegie's family, the official investigation was too focused on establishing Carnegie's cause of death, while ignoring wider policy issues. Further criticism concerned an alleged failure of some biologists to notice that an unnatural garbage-scavenging lifestyle meant wolves around the camp had flourished only to the extent they lacked fear of humans, and a proliferation of wolves thus selected was depleting the local deer population. Carnegie's father expressed concern that Saskatchewan's response was inadequate and that there was no real action being taken to tackle the circumstances which he believed had led to the attack.

After Carnegie's death, an electric fence was built around Points North Landing's landfill to prevent future predatory animal incidents. Eleven years later, a lone timber wolf attacked a young male 26-year-old worker in Cigar Lake. The worker was on his midnight break when it jumped and mauled him less than 100 meters from the main camp. A nearby security guard frightened the wolf away. She administered first aid and called for an air ambulance, which airlifted him 675 kilometres to a hospital in Saskatoon, where he recovered. After the attack, authorities ordered that wolves in the area be tracked down and shot. In addition, authorities required food disposal systems and inspected the fence around Cigar Lake's landfill, as well as providing more education to the mining staff members.

Five years later, a small pack of wolves in Chignik, Alaska, fatally attacked a young American woman.

The CBC put trapper Harold R. Johnson's book Cry Wolf, partially inspired by Carnegie's death, on its 2020 spring reading list.

== See also ==
- List of fatal bear attacks in North America
- Coyote attack
- Taylor Mitchell (victim of fatal coyote attack in Canada)
- Kelly Keen coyote attack (fatal coyote attack in the United States)
- Wolf attacks on humans
- List of wolf attacks in North America

== Bibliography ==
- Johnson, Harold R. (2020). Cry Wolf. Inquest into the true nature of a predator. University of Regina Press. ISBN 978-0889777385.
