= Rabbit Lake mine =

Uranium mine in Saskatchewan, Canada

Rabbit Lake Mine
- Location in Saskatchewan Rabbit Lake Mine (Canada)
- Location: Athabasca Basin, Saskatchewan, Canada; 58°11′52″N 103°42′49″W
- Products: Uranium
- Discovered: 1968
- Opened: 1975
- Active: 1975–1991; 1994–1998; 2002–2016
- Company: Cameco
- Acquired: 1988

Rabbit Lake is the second largest uranium milling facility in the western world, and is the longest-operating uranium production facility in Saskatchewan. The facility is located approximately 800 km north of Saskatoon, Saskatchewan, on the northeast edge of the uranium rich Athabasca Basin. The closest community is Wollaston Lake, about 40 kilometres by lake or air. Rabbit Lake was the first Canadian mine to offer a seven-days-in / seven-days-out commuter system of staffing. Access is provided by Highway 905. Production at Rabbit Lake was suspended in April 2016.

== Operations ==
The Rabbit Lake deposit was discovered in 1968 and production started in 1975 using open-pit mining methods. The Rabbit Lake pit was mined out in 1984. Exploration resulted in the discovery of additional deposits in the area.

Rabbit Lake Deposits
Name	Discovered	Commenced	Depleted	Comments
Rabbit Lake	1968	1975	1984	
Collins Bay A-zone	1971	1995	1997	
Collins Bay B-zone	1977	1985	1991	
Collins Bay D-zone	1979	1995	1996	
Eagle Point	1980	1994	-	Production hiatus from 1998 to 2002 due to depressed uranium prices. Production halted again in 2016.

The Eagle Point deposit is being mined using underground mining methods. Between 1975 and 2011, Rabbit Lake has produced 186.3 million pounds U_{3}O_{8}. Recent exploration drilling has extended mine life to 2017.

When the current refurbishments are complete, Rabbit Lake Mill will be positioned to undertake toll milling for future uranium mines in the area. Since an agreement was signed between AREVA and Cameco in late 2011, Rabbit Lake is no longer planned to process Cigar Lake Mine ore when it begins production in 2013, the McClean Lake mill will process all of the ore from that mine.

== Reserves ==
As of December 31, 2013, proven and probable reserves are 1,642,100 tonnes at 0.56% U_{3}O_{8}. (20.3 Million pounds U_{3}O_{8})

== Awards ==
The Rabbit Lake mine has been awarded the Canadian Institute of Mining, Metallurgy and Petroleum's John T. Ryan Trophy for the best safety record for metal mines several times. This award is given to the metal mine with the best safety record for the previous year.

National Trophy

- 1989
- 2001

Regional Trophy — Prairies and Northwest Territories

- 2003

== Ownership ==
100% owned and operated by Cameco Corporation.

== See also ==
- List of mines in Saskatchewan
- Unconformity uranium deposits
- Cigar Lake Mine
- Cluff Lake mine
- Key Lake mine
- McClean Lake mine
