= List of mines in Saskatchewan =

This is a list of mines in Saskatchewan, Canada.

Mine	Major commodities	Coordinates	Associated town	Owner	Dates	Comments	References
777 Mine	Copper; Zinc; Silver; Gold	54°46.5′N 101°52.8′W	Flin Flon	Hudbay	2004–2022		
Allan	Potash	51°55′51.9″N 106°4′18.2″W	Allan	Nutrien		Previously PotashCorp. Merged with Agrium to form Nutrien on January 1, 2018	
Belle Plaine	Potash	50°25′47.2″N 105°12′6.9″W	Belle Plaine	The Mosaic Company	1964–		
Bethune	Potash	50°37′47.6″N 105°24′5.4″W	Bethune	K+S Potash Canada	2017–	Mine in Operation as of June 2017	
Bienfait Lignite	Lignite		Bienfait	Prairie Mines & Royalty Ltd.			
Big Quill Lake	Potassium Sulphate		Wynyard	Compass Minerals			
Boundary Dam	Lignite		Estevan	Prairie Mines & Royalty Ltd.			
Chaplin	Sodium sulphate		Chaplin	Saskatchewan Minerals Inc.			
Cigar Lake Mine	Uranium	58°04′07″N 104°32′26″W	Arthabasca Basin	Cameco Orano Canada TEPCO	2005-	Partially owned by Idemitsu until 2022.	
Colonsay	Potash	51°56′1.2″N 105°45′50.2″W	Colonsay	The Mosaic Company			
Cory	Potash	52°05′26.2″N 106°51′10.4″W	Saskatoon	Nutrien		Previously PotashCorp. Merged with Agrium to form Nutrien on January 1, 2018	
Cluff Lake mine	Uranium	58°21′59.97″N 109°32′34.27″W		Orano Canada	1980–2002		
Erco	Salt		Saskatoon	ERCO Worldwide			
Esterhazy	Potash		Esterhazy	The Mosaic Company		K-1, K-2 & K-3 Mines	
Gunnar	Uranium	59.385°N 108.887°W	Uranium City	Gunnar Mines Ltd	1955–1962		
Hanson Lake Mine	Zinc, Lead, Copper, Silver	54.6461°N 102.8051°W	Hanson Lake	Voyageur Mineral Explorers Corp	1967–1969		
Hoidas Lake	Rare-earth elements (REE)			Great Western Minerals Group		Is the site of Canada's most advanced rare-earth element mining project	
Key Lake	Uranium	57°12′24″N 105°39′33″W		Cameco; Orano Canada	1983–1997	Mill facility still in use.	
Lanigan	Potash	51°51′17″N 105°12′34.6″W	Lanigan	Nutrien		Previously PotashCorp. Merged with Agrium to form Nutrien on January 1, 2018	
Lorado	Uranium	59.49°N 108.65°W	Uranium City	Lorado Uranium Mines Limited	1954–1960		
McClean Lake	Uranium	58°15′40″N 103°48′09″W		Orano Canada; Denison	1999–		
McArthur River	Uranium	57°45′45″N 105°03′07″W		Cameco; Orano Canada	1997–		
Old Post Kaolin	Kaolinite			Whitemud Resources Inc.			
Palo	Sodium Sulphate		Palo	Upcycle Minerals Inc.			
Patience Lake	Potash	52°5′20.3″N 106°22′38.4″W	Saskatoon	Nutrien		Previously PotashCorp. Merged with Agrium to form Nutrien on January 1, 2018	
Poplar River	Lignite		Coronach	Prairie Mines & Royalty Ltd.			
Rabbit Lake	Uranium	58°11′52″N 103°42′49″W		Cameco	1975–2016	Rabbit Lake was transitioned into safe care and maintenance in the second quarter of 2016.	
Rocanville	Potash; Salt	50°28′18.7″N 101°32′38.7″W	Rocanville	Nutrien		Previously PotashCorp. Merged with Agrium to form Nutrien on January 1, 2018	
Seabee Gold Operation	Precious Metals			SSR Mining			
Unity	Salt	52.425°N 109.166°W	Unity	Sifto Canada/Compass Minerals	1949–		
Vanscoy	Potash; Salt	52°00′26.9″N 107°05′34.5″W	Vanscoy	Nutrien		Previously Agrium. Merged with PotashCorp to form Nutrien on January 1, 2018	
Wilcox Bentonite	Bentonite		Wilcox	Canadian Clay Products, Inc.			
