= Points North Landing =

Camp settlement in Saskatchewan, Canada

Coordinates: 58°16′36″N 104°04′57″W

Points North Landing in Saskatchewan

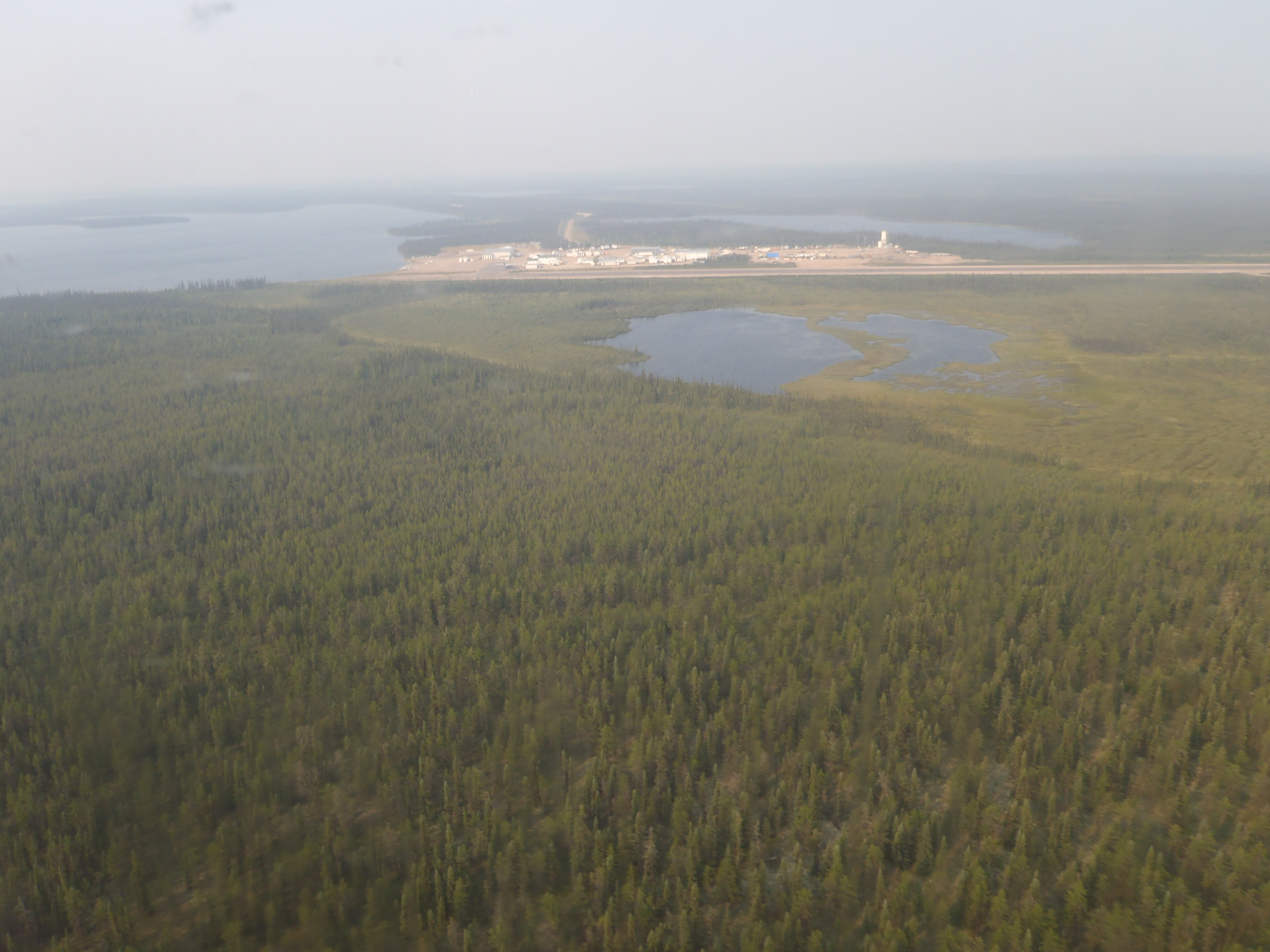
Points North from the air

Points North Landing is a camp settlement in northeastern Saskatchewan, Canada. It is 355 kilometres (221 mi) north-east of La Ronge, on Highway 905 and has an airport and a water aerodrome, with almost daily flights provided by West Wind Aviation and Rise Air. Gasoline, diesel, mechanics, a lumber yard, and other accommodations are available.

The region has been the site of two fatal animal attacks: the death of Kenton Carnegie, a University of Waterloo student killed by timber wolves on November 8, 2005, and the death of an unnamed uranium contractor by a black bear in May 2026.

It is used as a staging area and logistics area for a variety of activities in northern Saskatchewan. All-weather roads connect the location to the south and temporary winter roads are constructed from Points North Landing to various communities in the North. Several uranium mines are located near this site including Cigar Lake, McClean Lake, and Rabbit Lake.

== History ==
Points North Landing was founded by George Eikle, a Norcanair pilot, along with his brother and colleagues. The location was chosen as the easiest place to level for an airstrip. The name is descriptive.
