= Hanson Lake =

Lake in Saskatchewan, Canada

- Location in Saskatchewan Hanson Lake (Canada)
- Coordinates: 54.7156°N 102.8159°W
- Type: Glacial lake
- Part of: Saskatchewan River drainage basin
- Basin countries: Canada
- Surface area: 4,399.1 ha (10,870 acres)
- Max. depth: 30.5 m (100 ft)
- Shore length^{1}: 194.74 km (121.01 mi)
- Surface elevation: 325 m (1,066 ft)
- Islands: Winn Island
- Settlements: None
- ^{1} Shore length is not a well-defined measure.

Hanson Lake is a lake in the east-central part of the Canadian province of Saskatchewan in the boreal forest ecozone of Canada. The lake is irregularly shaped with many bays, islands, and channels as it was formed by glaciers during the last ice age. It is fed by multiple rivers and creeks from surrounding hills, smaller lakes, and muskeg. Hanson Lake's outflow is through a short river at the eastern end of the lake as it flows into the Sturgeon-Weir River, a tributary of the Saskatchewan River.

There are no communities on the lake; the closest city is Flin Flon, Manitoba to the east. On the western shore is a provincial recreation site and on the southern shore is a mine. The lake is accessed from the Hanson Lake Road.

== Description ==
There are multiple bays and islands in Hanson Lake, notably McIlvenna Bay, Bertrum Bay, Winn Bay, and Winn Island. It is surrounded by several lakes that flow into it, including Sample Lake, Jake Pine Lake, Bad Carrot Lake, Guyader Lake, and Bay Lake. The outflow is at the far eastern point of the lake and it flows south-east into Halfway Lake. From Halfway Lake, the river flows east into Attree Lake, which is a lake along the course of the Sturgeon-Weir River. The Sturgeon-Weir River flows south-east into Namew Lake, then through Whitey Narrows into Cumberland Lake of the Saskatchewan River Delta. The whole system is within the Hudson Bay drainage basin.

== Hanson Lake Recreation Site ==
Hanson Lake Recreation Site (54.6775°N 102.8561°W) is a provincial recreation area on the western shore of Hanson Lake. It is accessed from Beaver Road, which branches off of the Hanson Lake Road. The site has a small campground, picnic area, and boat launch.

== Hanson Lake Mine ==
Hanson Lake Mine (54.6461°N 102.8051°W) is a mine located along the southern shore of Hanson Lake. It is south of Winn Bay and east of McIlvenna Bay. The mine has a circular formation and is about 550 metres in diameter.

== See also ==
- List of lakes of Saskatchewan
- List of protected areas of Saskatchewan
- List of mines in Saskatchewan
- Tourism in Saskatchewan
