= Hoidas Lake =

Lake in Saskatchewan, Canada

- Location in Saskatchewan Hoidas Lake (Canada)
- Location: Northern Administration District, Saskatchewan
- Coordinates: 59.928°N 107.820°W
- Part of: Mackenzie River drainage basin
- Basin countries: Canada
- Max. length: 3.7 km (2.3 mi)
- Surface area: 180.5 ha (446 acres)
- Shore length^{1}: 11 km (6.8 mi)
- Surface elevation: 451 m (1,480 ft)
- Settlements: None
- ^{1} Shore length is not a well-defined measure.

Hoidas Lake is a small, remote northern lake in the Canadian province of Saskatchewan. It is about 7 kilometres (4.3 mi) south of the Saskatchewan–Northwest Territories border and 50 kilometres (31 mi) north of Uranium City in the Tazin River watershed. Named in honour of Irvin Frank Hoidas, a Royal Canadian Air Force pilot officer killed in action during the Second World War when his Stirling W-7520 crashed near the Belgian town of Sint-Truiden, it is the site of Canada's most advanced rare-earth element (REE) mining project.

== Setting ==
Hoidas Lake lies in the Northern Rae Geological Province, in the general vicinity of many of Saskatchewan's large uranium mines.

== Mineralogy ==
The mineralogy of the Hoidas Lake rare-earth deposit differs from most other such deposits in that it is hosted in veins of apatite and allanite. Hoidas Lake also differs from other deposits in that it contains a significant amount of heavy rare-earth elements, such as dysprosium. This abundance of heavy REEs is significant, as there is a growing demand for the heavier rare earths in high-tech manufacturing (such as the use of dysprosium in the manufacturing of hybrid car components). Mineralization is presumably hydrothermal, from an alkali or carbonatitic source at depth.

The main prospective zone is composed of two dominant rock types: a variably deformed monzogranite and a granodioritic to tonalitic gneiss. Both are Paleoproterozoic to Archean in age.

== Resource scale ==
Ongoing work at Hoidas Lake has delineated a vein system (known as the JAK zone), which extends for at least a kilometre along the strike. The limits of the system have not been established along the strike nor along the dip, and the zone's total extension is therefore unknown. The resource zone averages 75 m in width and is composed of individual veins which, though ranging from one to eleven metres in thickness, average about three metres each. Veins are continuous to 300 m depth and follow an anastomosing (branching) geometry.

Estimates of the resource, given current delineations and assuming a 1.5% total rare-earth cutoff, have established a presence of at least 286,000 tonnes of rare-earth ore, which is enough to supply more than 10% of the North American market for the foreseeable future.

== Ownership ==
The Hoidas Lake claims are owned by Great Western Minerals Group, based in Saskatoon.

== See also ==
- List of lakes of Saskatchewan
- List of mines in Saskatchewan
