= Orano Canada =

Uranium company

Orano Canada Inc.
- Industry: Mining, Energy
- Founded: 1964
- Headquarters: Saskatoon, Saskatchewan
- Key people: Jim Corman, President and CEO
- Products: Uranium
- Number of employees: 475
- Website: https://www.orano.group/canada/en

Orano Canada (formerly Areva Resources Canada Inc.) is a uranium mining, milling, and exploration company headquartered in Saskatoon, Saskatchewan, Canada. Orano Canada is a subsidiary of Orano, a French multinational nuclear energy company headquartered in Paris, France with 16,000 employees worldwide.

== History ==
Orano and its predecessor companies have been active in Canada since 1964, primarily operating within northern Saskatchewan's Athabasca Basin. The company's first major activities began with the exploration and development of the Cluff Lake project. The first Cluff Lake uranium orebody was discovered in 1969 and by 1980, operations began at the newly built mine and mill. The mine was shut down in 2002 and has since been decommissioned.

In 1993, Orano acquired majority interest and operational control of the McClean Lake and Midwest projects in the eastern Athabasca Basin. By 1995, Orano began mining at the McClean Lake site while also starting construction on its uranium processing mill. By 1999, uranium concentrate (yellowcake) production began at the newly finished mill. From 2010 to 2014, the McClean Lake mill was placed under care and maintenance and by 2012, upgrade and expansion construction work began at the mill. In October, 2014, the McClean Lake mill restarted with the processing of all ore from the newly opened Cigar Lake mine.

== Operations ==
- McClean Lake mine
- Cluff Lake mine
- Cigar Lake Mine
- McArthur River mine and Key Lake mill.

== See also ==
- Uranium
- Uranium mining
- Nuclear power
- Nuclear power in Canada
