= J. Hampden Porter =

Assistant surgeon during the American Civil War

John Hampden Porter, M.D. (October 19, 1837 – January 31, 1908) was a U. S. Navy Acting Assistant Surgeon and U.S. Army Assistant Surgeon during the Civil War. He later became a writer, sociologist, naturalist, and big game hunter. He traveled extensively in Central America at the end of the 19th century and early 20th century, and wrote papers for the Smithsonian Institution and the International Bureau of the American Republics. He wrote popular books and a weekly column for the New York Tribune based on his world travels and adventures as a big game hunter.

== Education ==
He was a cadet, Military Academy, Norwich University, Northfield, Vermont, 1854-56. He is listed as an 1857 Non-Graduate. He was then a cadet, U.S. Military Academy at West Point, New York, July 1. 1858 to December 20, 1858. He was appointed at Pennsylvania – Not a Graduate.

M.D., Georgetown University, Medical Department, 1861.

== Career ==
After graduating with an M.D. from Georgetown University, Medical Department in 1861, Dr John Hampden Porter was examined by the U. S. Navy Medical Examining Board and appointed Acting Assistant Surgeon, October 17, 1861. He resigned June 25, 1862. He was then appointed an Assistant Surgeon, United States Army Volunteers, November 25, 1864. On December 20, 1865 he received a promotion to Brevit Captain for "faithful service." On January 10, 1866 he mustered out of the Army at Washington, D.C., with an honorable discharge. He examined for commission as an Assistant Surgeon in the Regular U. S. Army Medical Department in 1866, but was rejected. Eventually, he became a researcher for the Smithsonian Institution, and, later, the International Bureau of the American Republics.

== Works ==
- 1889: Cradles of the American Aborigines, by Otis T. Mason, with Notes on the artificial deformation of children among savage and civilized peoples by J.H. Porter
- 1894: "Notes on the Folk-Lore of the Mountain Whites of the Alleghanies" in Journal of North American Folklore, Vol. 7
- 1894: Wild beasts; a study of the characters and habits of the elephant, lion, leopard, panther, jaguar, tiger, puma, wolf, and grizzly bear
- 1896: An article about adventures with elephants in the jungles of India in the February issue of Frank Leslie's Popular Monthly
- 1899: "A Hunting Trip in India. A Thrilling Encounter With a Bear" in National Tribune
- 1899: "A Hunting Trip in India. Day's Adventures in Pursuit of 'Stripes.'"
- 1899: "A Hunting Trip in India. Beating for Tiger in the Satpura Hills."
- 1899: "A Hunting Trip in India. Montel Meets a Violent Death in the Forest."
- 1901: (Series of nonfiction articles in National Tribune under one title) "Canoeing Along Nicaragua. Adventures on Sea and Shore Amongst the Mosquito Indians" in National Tribune
- 1902: "Chapter VI: Native Races" in Paraguay
- 1904: "Appendix 1: Native Races of Honduras" in Honduras. Geographical sketch, natural resources, laws, economic conditions, actual development, prospects of future growth
