= Key Lake mine =

Uranium mine in Saskatchewan, Canada

Key Lake mine & mill
- Location in Saskatchewan
- Location: Athabasca Basin, Saskatchewan, Canada; 57°12′24″N 105°39′33″W
- Products: Uranium
- Production: 0
- Financial year: 2019
- Discovered: 1975 (Gaertner); 1976 (Dielmann)
- Opened: 1983
- Active: 1983–1987 (Gaertner); 1989–1997 (Dielmann); 1999–2018 (milling McArthur River ore)
- Closed: 2018 (mill)
- Company: Cameco (83.33%); Orano Canada (16.67%)

The Key Lake mine is a former uranium mine in Saskatchewan, Canada. It is 570 kilometres (350 mi) north of Saskatoon by air on the southern rim of the uranium-rich Athabasca Basin. Key Lake was initially developed to open-pit mine two nearby uranium ore deposits: the Gaertner deposit and the Deilmann deposit. Mining of this ore ceased in the late 1990s; the Key Lake mill now processes uranium ore from the McArthur River mine and from existing stockpiles on site. High-grade ore from McArthur river is blended with lower grade local rock before being passed through the mill. The mill has a permitted annual production capacity of 25 million pounds of U_{3}O_{8}. In addition, ammonium sulfate fertilizer is produced as a byproduct from used reagents. The pits of the mined out local deposits are being used as mill tailings management facilities.

Its deposits jointly remain one of the higher grade large uranium deposits discovered, with an average grade of over 2% U_{3}O_{8}. Key Lake was the third largest uranium deposit in the Athabasca Basin and is surpassed only by McArthur River and Cigar Lake.

Uranium exploration was carried out by a joint venture led by Uranerz Exploration and Mining, a subsidiary of German Uranerzbergbau GmbH. Uranium anomalies in lake water detected in 1969 were followed up in 1971 with the location of radioactive pitchblende boulders in transported overburden, which were eventually followed back to their source, resulting in the discovery of the Gaertner orebody of the Key Lake deposits in 1975.

The nearest village by road is Pinehouse, 220 kilometres south of Key Lake. The mine is considered the official northern terminus of Saskatchewan Highway 914, as reflected by provincial highway maps, although online mapping such as Google Maps suggest the highway continues on to another mine, McArthur River, further to the north.

In late 2017, citing "continued low uranium prices", Cameco announced that the McArthur River/Key Lake operation would suspend production for approximately ten months starting by the end of January 2018. In July 2018 Cameco announced that this shut-down would extend for an indefinite period of time pending an upswing in the uranium market.

== History ==
Key Lake Deposits
Name	Discovered	Commenced	Depleted	Comments
Gaertner	1975	1983	1987	
Dielmann	1976	1989	1997	Ore stockpiled to mix with and dilute high-grade McArthur River ore. The open pit is used as a tailings management facility for McArthur River ore.

== Production ==
Together, between 1983 and 2002, the two Key Lake deposits produced a total of 209.8 million pounds of U_{3}O_{8} at an average grade of 2.32%. In 2017 the mill produced 16.1 million pounds of yellowcake.

== Ownership ==
The Key Lake operation is owned by Cameco Corporation (83.33%) and Orano Canada (previously called AREVA Resources Canada Inc) (16.67%), formerly COGEMA Resources Inc. Cameco is the operator.

== Wolf attack ==
A lone timber wolf attacked fifty-five-year-old Fred Desjarlais who was jogging back to the mine's camp on 31 December 2004. Desjarlais tried to frighten the wolf away, but it continued approach and finally jumped on him. He grabbed the wolf around the neck and tried to wrestle it into submission. A busload of his Cameco colleagues spotted the incident and successfully rescued him. The wolf subsequently disappeared into the boreal forest. Desjarlais received stitches when his colleagues took him to a nearby medical facility. A few hours later, an air ambulance took Desjarlais from Key Lake Airport to Saskatoon's Royal University Hospital where he began a series of rabies treatments. After the attack on Desjarlais, governmental authorities built an electric fence around Key Lake's landfill to prevent further predatory animal attacks on miners.

== See also ==
- Unconformity uranium deposits
- List of mines in Saskatchewan
- List of uranium mines
- Cigar Lake Mine
- Cluff Lake mine
- McArthur River uranium mine
- McClean Lake mine
- Rabbit Lake mine
