= Athabasca Basin =

Region of the Canadian Shield in Saskatchewan and Alberta, Canada

Coordinates: 58.446°N 108.332°W

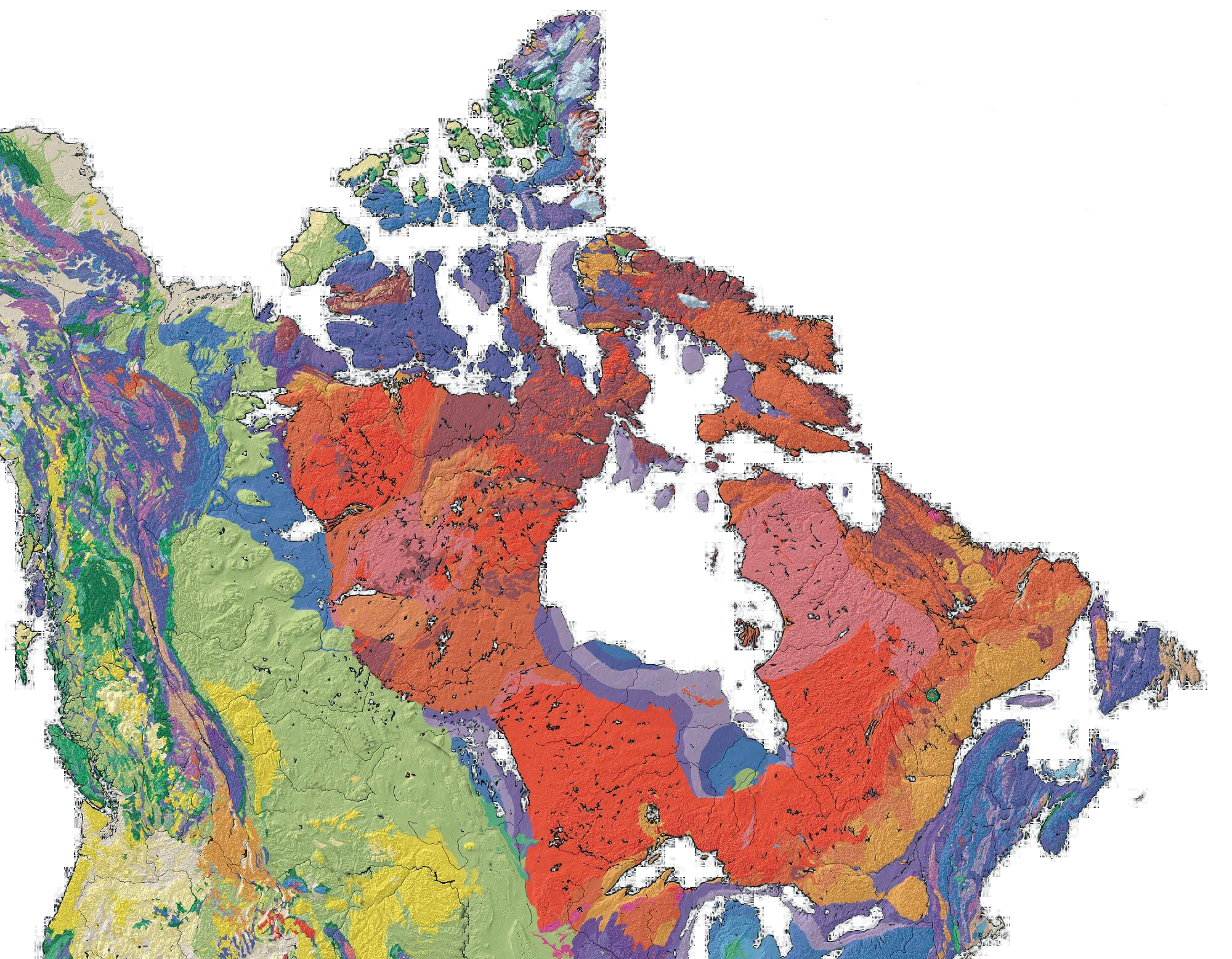
Location of the Athabasca Basin in the Canadian Shield
Uranium mines in the Athabasca Basin

The Athabasca Basin is a region in the Canadian Shield of northern Saskatchewan and Alberta, Canada. It is best known as the world's leading source of high-grade uranium and currently supplies about 20% of the world's uranium.

The basin is located just to the south of Lake Athabasca, west of Wollaston Lake, and encloses almost all of Cree Lake. It covers about 100,000 square kilometres (39,000 sq mi) in Saskatchewan and a small portion of Alberta. The surface of the basin consists of main sandstone sediment varying from 100 to 1,000 metres (330 to 3,280 ft) in depth. The uranium ore is mostly found at the base of this sandstone, at the point where it meets the basement.

On the northern and eastern edges are the communities of Fort Chipewyan in Alberta and Camsell Portage, Stony Rapids, Fond du Lac, Black Lake and Wollaston Lake in Saskatchewan. Much of the Athabasca Basin is within the migratory range of the Beverly caribou herd a major source of sustenance for the Denesuline communities.

Within the basin are the Athabasca Sand Dunes Provincial Park on the south shore of Lake Athabasca and the Carswell crater. The Cluff Lake mine site is located in the crater area.

Points North Landing, a permanent supply depot and camp, serves the eastern area of the basin.

Road access to the area is provided by Saskatchewan Highway 955 from the village of La Loche on the west side and Saskatchewan Highway 914 and Saskatchewan Highway 905 north of the town of La Ronge on the east side.

== Uranium mines ==
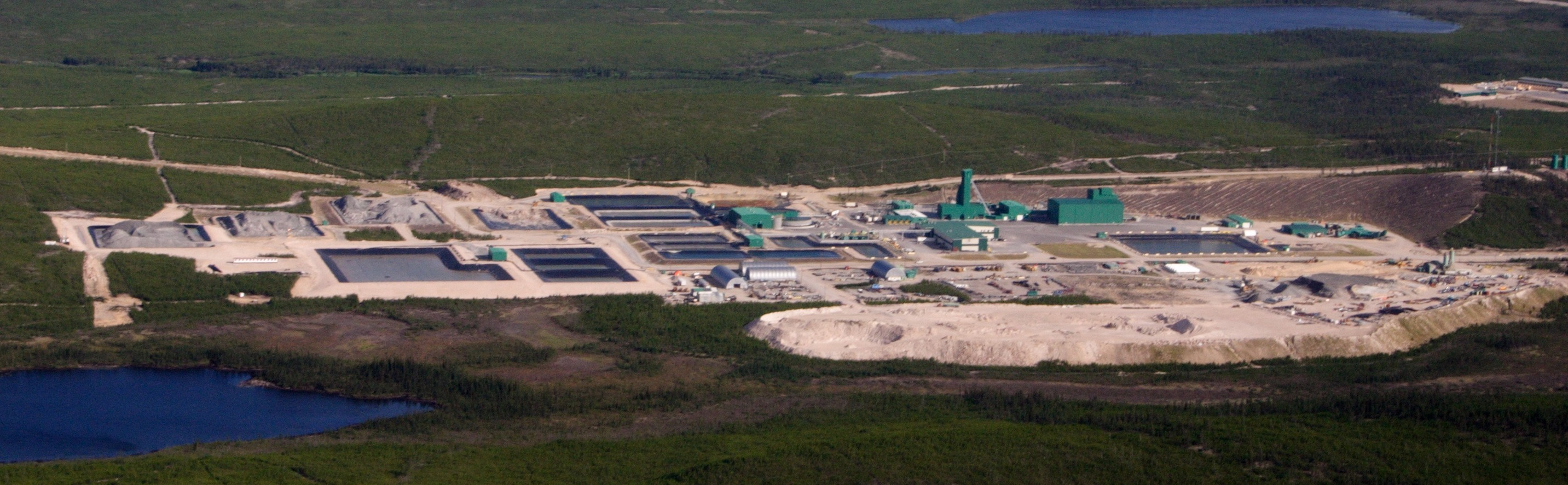
McArthur River uranium mine aerial view

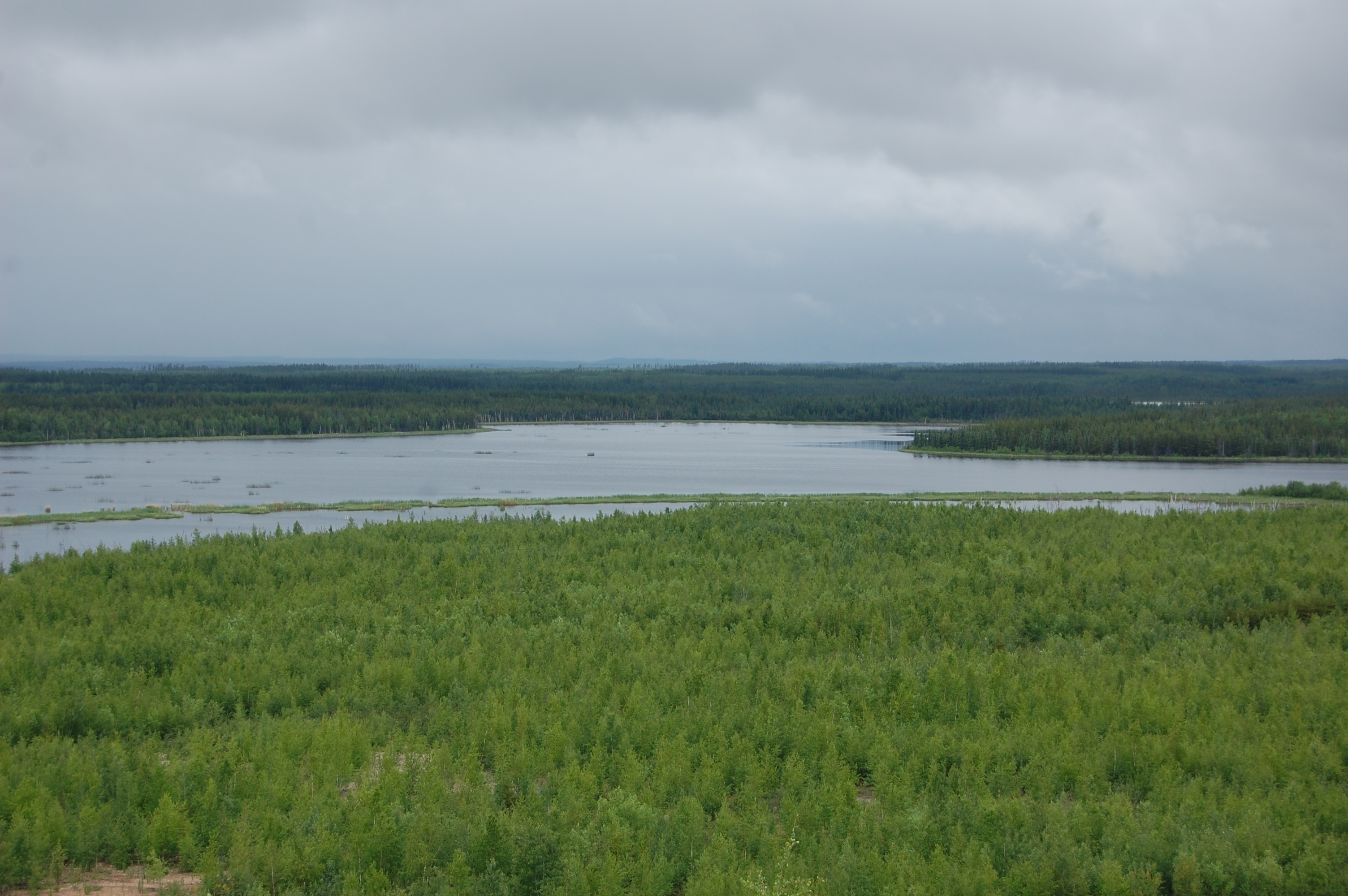
Claude Lake near the Cluff Lake mine

Uranium was discovered in the region in the 1940s. The first mine in the area was the Rabbit Lake Mine, which was discovered in 1968 by Gulf Mineral Resources and opened in 1975. The most important current mine is Cameco's McArthur River mine, the world's largest high-grade uranium mine. Other uranium mines in the Athabasca Basin include the Cigar Lake Mine, the Key Lake mine and the McClean Lake mine. Former mines include the Cluff Lake mine and Gunnar mine.

Dikes in the Athabasca Basin are related to the giant Mackenzie dike swarm.

== See also ==
- List of uranium projects
- Geology of Saskatchewan
