= Saskatchewan Highway 914 =

Provincial highway in Saskatchewan, Canada

Highway 914

Route information
- Maintained by Ministry of Highways and Infrastructure
- Length: 268 km (167 mi)

Major junctions
- South end: Highway 165 south of Pinehouse
- North end: Local roads at Key Lake Mine

Location
- Country: Canada
- Province: Saskatchewan

Highway system
- Provincial highways in Saskatchewan
← Highway 913	→ Highway 915

Highway 914 is a provincial highway in the north-west and far north regions of the Canadian province of Saskatchewan. The highway begins at a turn in Highway 165 and officially ends at Key Lake mine. It does not intersect with any provincially-owned highways between Highway 165 and Key Lake Mine. Along its entire length, it passes through only one community, Pinehouse. It is about 268 kilometres (167 mi) long.

== Route description ==
Along Highway 914's route, it passes by notable lakes such as Pinehouse Lake and Gordon Lake, crosses the Churchill River, and follows Haultain River for much of its length. Gordon Lake Recreation Site is accessible from the highway.

Although the official highway map of Saskatchewan shows the highway terminating at Key Lake, Google Maps and its aerial photography shows the road actually continues on to the McArthur River uranium mine further to the north. Access to this portion of the road is restricted, and is therefore not part of the official highway network.

== Major intersections ==
Rural municipality	Location	km	mi	Destinations	Notes
Northern Saskatchewan	South of Pinehouse	0	0.0	Highway 165	Southern terminus of Route 914
Northern Saskatchewan	Key Lake mine	268	167	Local roads	Northern terminus of Route 914
1.000 mi = 1.609 km; 1.000 km = 0.621 mi

== See also ==
- Roads in Saskatchewan
- Transportation in Saskatchewan
