= McArthur River uranium mine =

Uranium deposit in Saskatchewan, Canada

McArthur River Uranium Mine
- Location in Saskatchewan McArthur River Uranium Mine (Canada)
- Location: Athabasca Basin, Saskatchewan, Canada; 57°45′40″N 105°03′06″W
- Products: Yellowcake (U_{3}O_{8})
- Production: 16.1 million pounds (7,300 t)
- Financial year: 2017
- Discovered: 1988
- Opened: 1999
- Active: 1999–2018
- Company: Cameco (70%); Orano Canada (30%)

The McArthur River Uranium Mine, in northern Saskatchewan, Canada, is the world's largest high-grade uranium deposit.

The mine is owned by Cameco (70%), and Orano Canada (30%) (formerly Areva Resources Canada, formerly COGEMA Resources Inc.). Cameco is the mine operator.

In 2012, McArthur River was the world's largest producing uranium mine, accounting for 13% of world mine production. Canada, as a whole, produces 15% of the world's uranium production.

== History ==
The McArthur River deposit was discovered in 1988. The property is located 620 kilometres (390 mi) as the crow flies north of Saskatoon, Saskatchewan, and 80 kilometres (50 mi) northeast of the Key Lake mill in the uranium rich Athabasca Basin. Mine construction began in 1997, with production commencing in 1999. The mine achieved full commercial production in November 2000. Production is regulated at 18.7 million pounds (8,500 t) of yellowcake a year with the ore being processed through the Key Lake mill.

Between 2000 and 2013, the McArthur River/Key Lake operation produced 250.6 million pounds (113,700 t) U_{3}O_{8}. This production figure includes blended low grade stockpiles from the former Key Lake mine as well as ore derived from the McArthur River mine. Ignoring the fact that 2000 mostly saw a ramp-up to full scale production and the effect of the Key Lake mine ore, this averages to roughly 17.9 million pounds (8,100 t) yearly production or some 96% of the above-mentioned 18.7 million pound per year limit.

In July 2018, citing continued low uranium prices, Cameco suspended McArthur River/Key Lake operations and placed the mine on care and maintenance. In February 2022, Cameco announced it would reopen the mine.

== Reserves ==
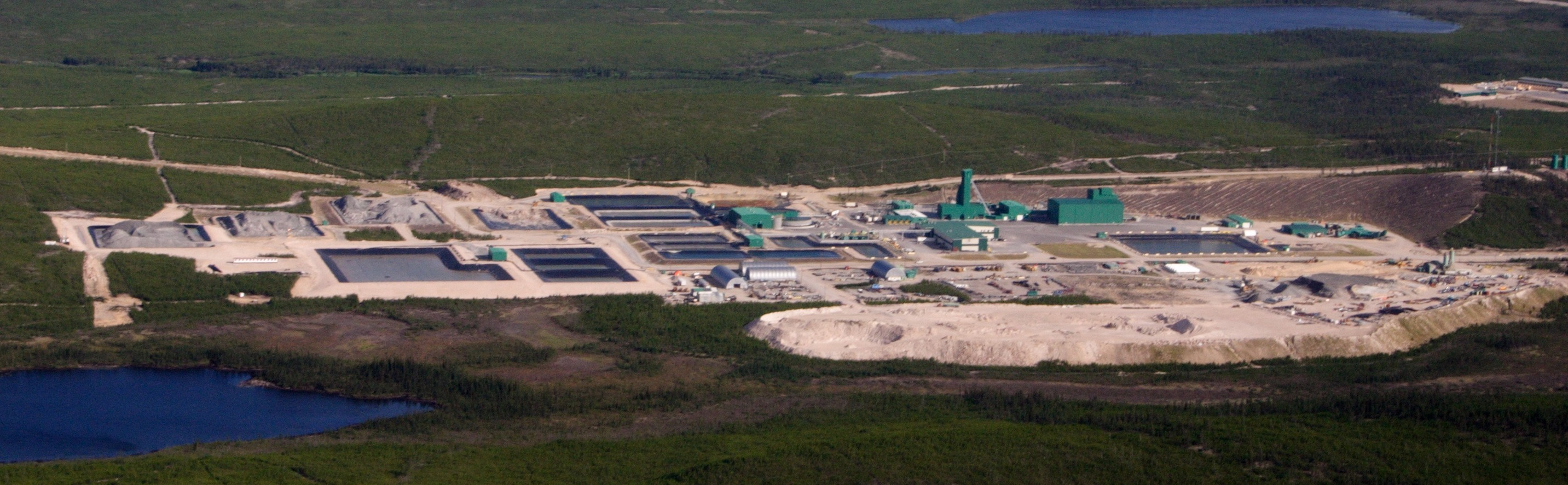
McArthur River Uranium Mine aerial view

As of December 31, 2017, the mine had proven and probable reserves of 391.9 million pounds (177,800 t), with an average grade of 6.89% U_{3}O_{8}. At an average yearly production rate of 16.1 million pounds (7,300 t) this gives a calculated range of roughly 24 years.

== Access ==
The mine is serviced by the McArthur River Airport to the northeast. It is also connected to the south by a restricted access haulage road. According to Google Maps, this road is Highway 914, however the official 2011 highway map of Saskatchewan indicates that 914 terminates at a checkpoint at Key Lake mine, while the road that continues to McArthur is not a public highway (owned by Cameco) and does not appear on maps.

== Safety ==
During the most hazardous mining operations, remote controlled underground mining systems are used to reduce personnel exposure to rock particulates, radon gas, and other hazards. A video detailing the operations at the mine is provided by Cameco.

The McArthur River mine has been awarded the Canadian Institute of Mining, Metallurgy and Petroleum's John T. Ryan Trophy for the best safety record for metal mines several times. This award is given to the metal mine with the best safety record for the previous year.

== See also ==
- List of mines in Saskatchewan
- Unconformity uranium deposits
- Uranium mining
- Uranium mining in Canada
