= Cluff Lake mine =

Decommissioned mine in Saskatchewan, Canada

Cluff Lake Mine
- Location in Saskatchewan

Location
- Location: Athabasca Basin, Saskatchewan, Canada; 58°21′59.97″N 109°32′34.27″W

Production
- Products: Uranium

History
- Discovered: 1960s
- Opened: 1980
- Closed: 2002

Owner
- Company: AREVA / Orano

Cluff Lake mine is decommissioned former uranium mine located in northern Saskatchewan, located 30 km east of the provincial border with Alberta and approximately 75 kilometres south of Lake Athabasca.

The mine and mill were owned and operated by AREVA Resources Canada, formerly COGEMA Resources and is now owned and operated by Orano Canada.

The former mine lies south of the center of the Carswell impact crater.

== History ==
The mine operated from 1981 and used both open pit and underground extraction.

Mining infrastructure consisted of a central mill, above ground tailings management area, 3 open pits, 2 underground mines, associated waste rock piles, and site infrastructure including the Cluff Lake airstrip and residences.

The mine expected to close in 2000, but additional higher ore grades in the underground mine allowed production to continue for an additional two years.

The mine closed in 2002 once the ore reserves were depleted.

Total production during the mine's 22-year operating life was over 62 million pounds of yellowcake.

Decommissioning mostly happened in the subsequent five years and was totally completed in 2013 once the camp residence and Cluff Lake Airport were removed.

Decommissioning activities were described by the Canadian Nuclear Safety Commission:

"the Claude pit was completely filled in. The DJ/DJX and D pits were flooded and remain isolated from adjacent natural water bodies. Potentially problematic portions of the surface waste rock piles were placed into the pits, while the remainder of the surface waste rock was contoured, covered and revegetated. The portals and vents to the underground mines were closed and the TMA was contoured, covered and revegetated. All structures were dismantled and disposed of."

In July 2019, Canadian Nuclear Safety Commission: renewed Orano's uranium mine licence renewal by five years, though until July 31, 2024. As per their 2020 report:

"The licence renewal also reduced the licensed area for sections that were not used for mining and milling from the licence footprint to allow Orano to return the surface leases to the Province of Saskatchewan. There were no issues or concerns identified. The recovery of the site is proceeding as anticipated"

In February 2020, Orano applied to transfer responsibility for site to the Government of Saskatchewan.

== Gallery ==
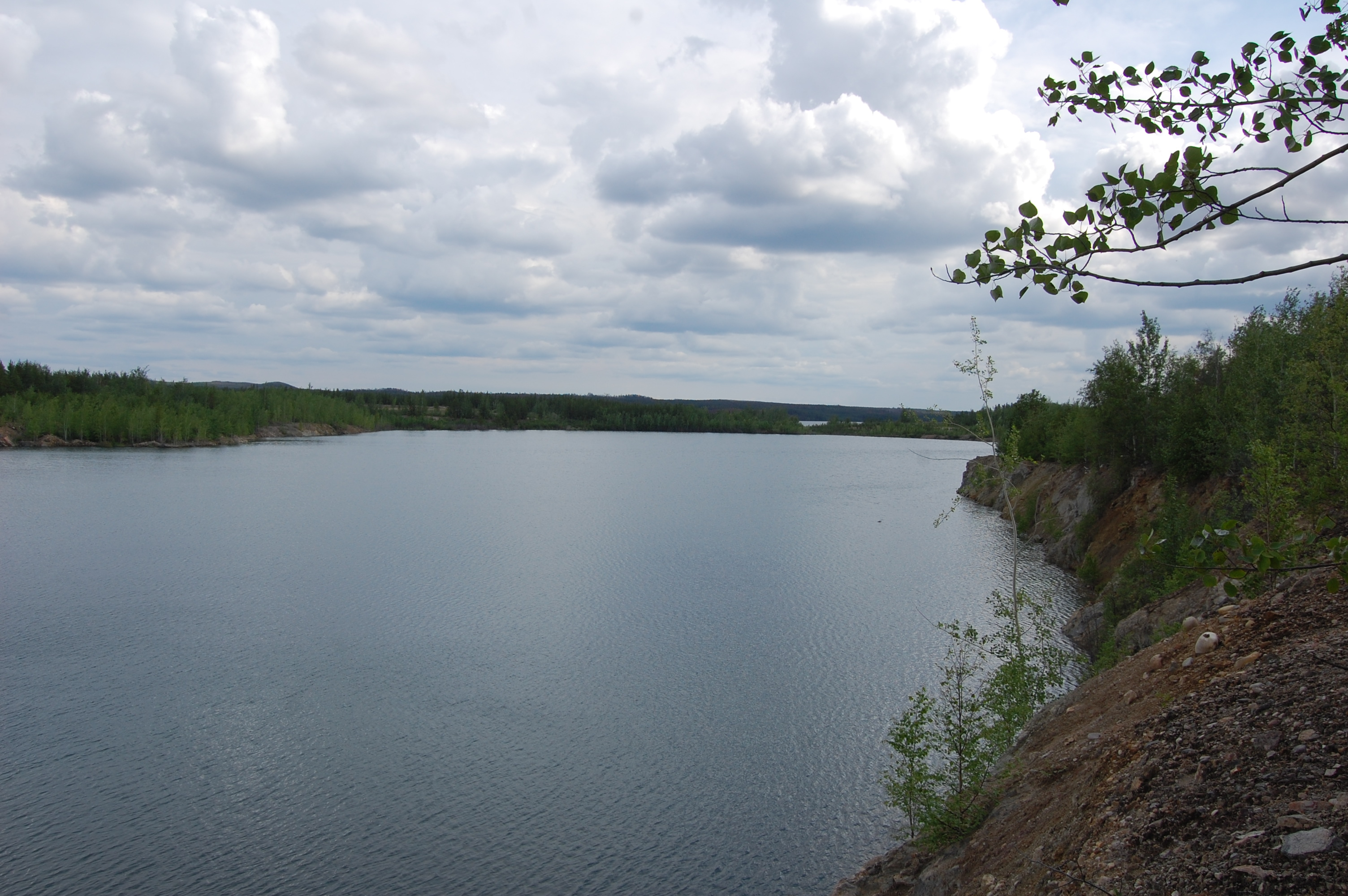
DJX pit lake

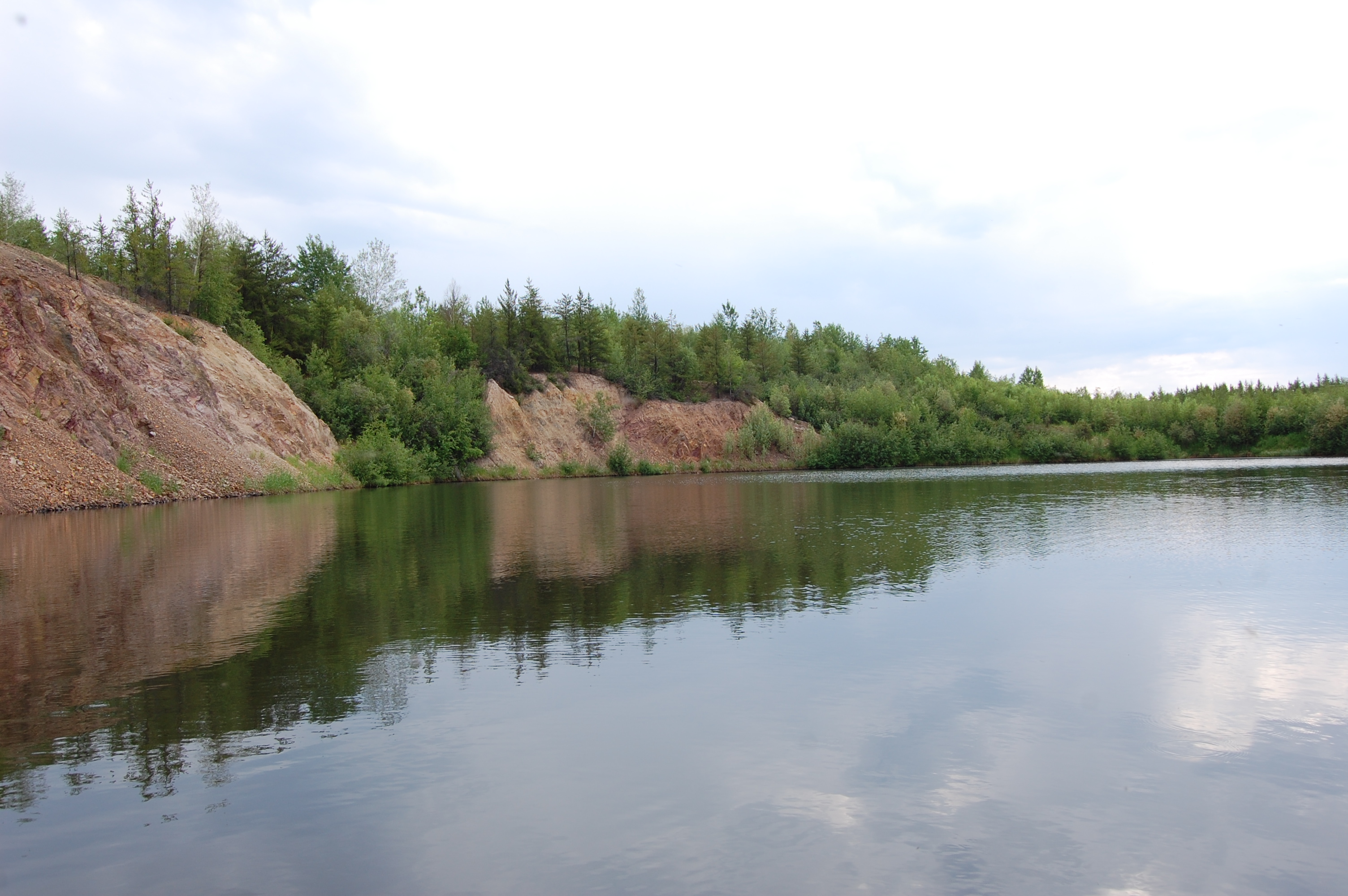
D pit lake

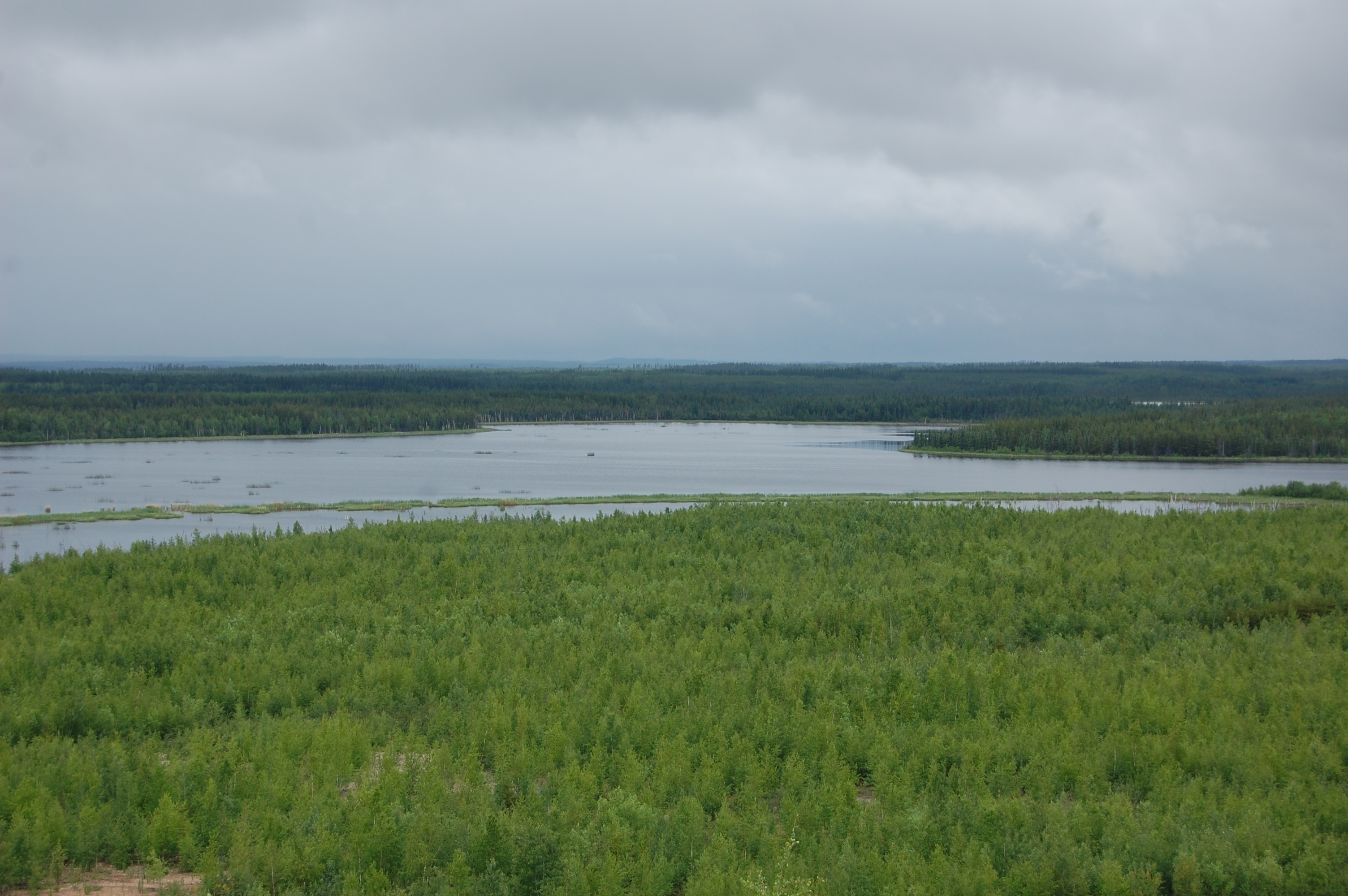
Claude lake as seen from the waste rock pile

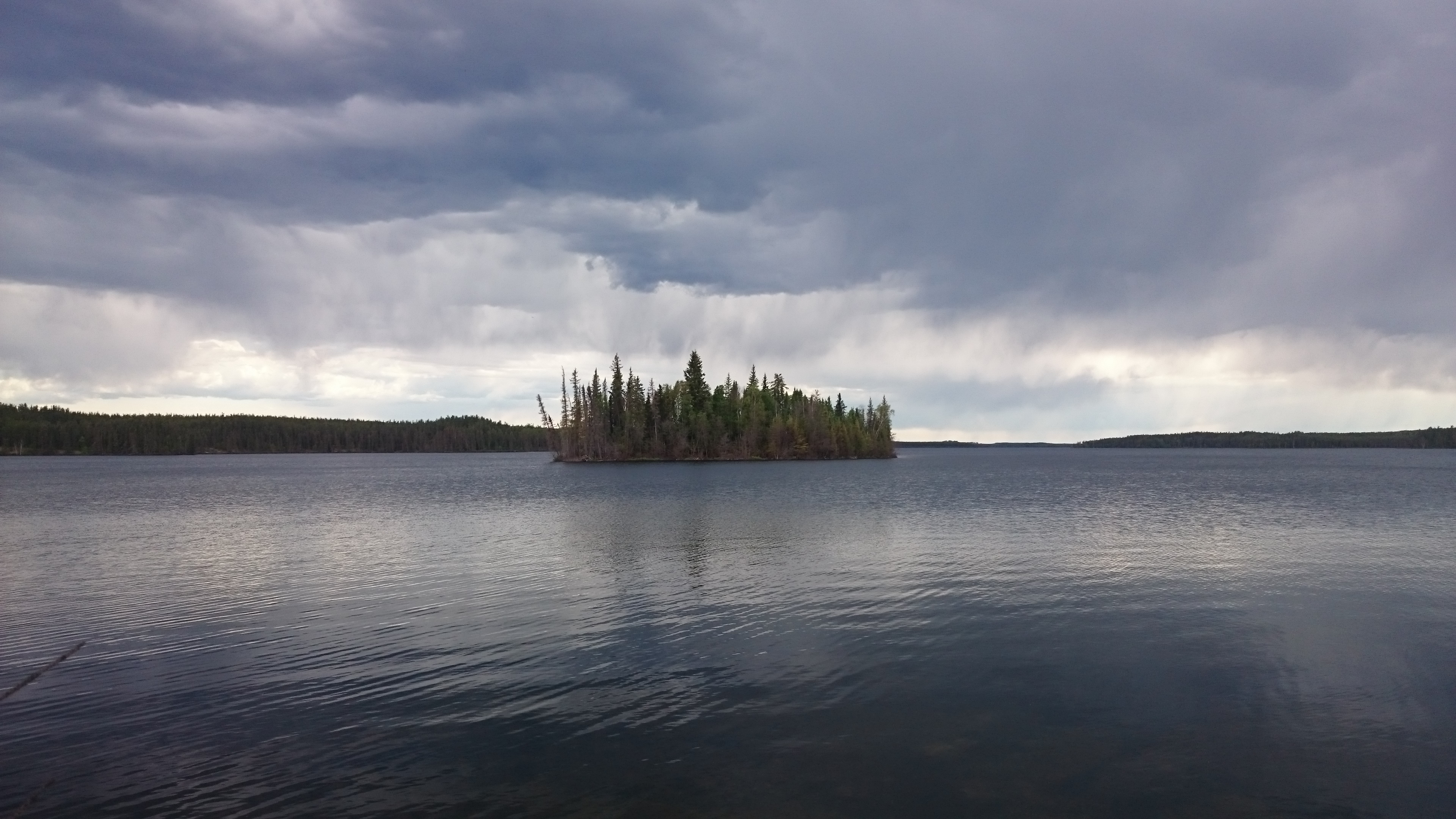
Island on the Cluff Lake

== See also ==
- List of mines in Saskatchewan
