= McClean Lake mine =

Uranium mine in Saskatchewan, Canada

McClean Lake Mine
- Location in Saskatchewan McClean Lake Mine (Canada)
- Location: Athabasca Basin, Saskatchewan, Canada; 58°15′40″N 103°48′09″W
- Products: Uranium
- Discovered: 1979
- Opened: 1999
- Company: Orano (77.5%), Denison Mines (22.5%)
- Acquired: 1979 (Discovery)

The McClean Lake mine is a uranium mine and milling operation located west of Wollaston Lake, about 700 kilometres north of Saskatoon, in the Athabasca Basin region of Saskatchewan, Canada. The McClean ore body was discovered in 1979, followed by the discovery of the JEB ore body in 1982. From 1985 to 1990, a cluster of deposits named Sue A, Sue B, and Sue C were discovered.

Production from the JEB and Sue C open pits commenced in 1999. Upon depletion, the JEB pit was converted to a Tailings Management Facility (TMF). The Sue C pit will be converted to a TMF for the disposal of waste from the McLean Lake and Cigar Lake operations. Production from the Sue A mine and development of the Sue E mine, commenced in mid-2005.

After the tailings from the milling operations and waste rock from the mining operations are chemically treated to precipitate arsenic and nickel they are pumped into the TMF. There they form a consolidated mass of much lower permeability than the surrounding sandstone. As a result, the groundwater flow is diverted around the tailings. By these means the water quality in adjacent Fox and Pat Lakes is expected to be maintained within Saskatchewan Surface Water Quality Objectives over the long term (10,000 years). This expectation has to be confirmed by monitoring subject to oversight by the Canadian Nuclear Safety Commission (CNSC).

== See also ==
- List of mines in Saskatchewan
