= Uranium mining in the Elliot Lake area =

The city of Elliot Lake; the lake on the right

Uranium mining in the Elliot Lake area (prior to 1955, more commonly known as the Blind River area) represents one of two major uranium-producing areas in Ontario, and one of seven in Canada.

In the mid-1950s, the influx of people to Elliot Lake seeking uranium was described by engineer A. S. Bayne in a 1977 report as the "greatest uranium prospecting rush in the world".

Mining activities peaked around 1959 and 1960 to respond to US military demand for uranium during the Cold War.

By 1958, Canada had become one of the world's leading producers of uranium and the $274 million of uranium exports that year represented Canada's most significant mineral export. By 1963, the federal government had purchased more than $1.5 billion of uranium from Canadian producers for export. The opening of the mines and the workers they attracted led to the creation of the planned town of Elliot Lake.

US demand slumped in the early 1960s, but the increasing use of nuclear power for electricity-generation, in Canada and abroad, prompted some mines back into action.

Production slowed until the 1990s when it ceased. The Elliot Lake area now has ten decommissioned mines and 102 million tons of uranium tailings. Former miners have been left with a twofold increase in lung cancer development and mortality rates.

== Area and nomenclature ==
The 200 square mile area north of Lake Huron that was Canada's largest uranium producing area has been referred to by various names as time passed, specifically Algoma, Blind River and Elliot Lake.

Algoma is the name of a wider district that includes this area. Blind River was initially the nearest human settlement, located 12 miles west of the nearest mine, until Elliot Lake was created, which is close to most of the mines.

The only road access to the town of Elliot Lake is via Ontario Highway 108.

== Geology ==
Towards the end of the Wisconsin glaciation period, ice flowed approximately south (predominantly at 190°) across the area know known as Elliot Lake. Geologists believe that as the ice sheet retreated back north, it left a large proglacial lake just north of Elliot Lake, probably as part of the main Lake Algonquin. Today's features were created from sediments that sunk while the area was below the 335m deep lake. As the ice retreated, about 10,800 years ago, the ice holding the lake melted, causing the sand and gravel sediments to spill into the valleys.

Microscopic grains of uranium occur in ores of uraninite, brannerite and monazite amongst pyritic sheets of quartz-pebble rock.

== History ==
=== Traditional territory ===
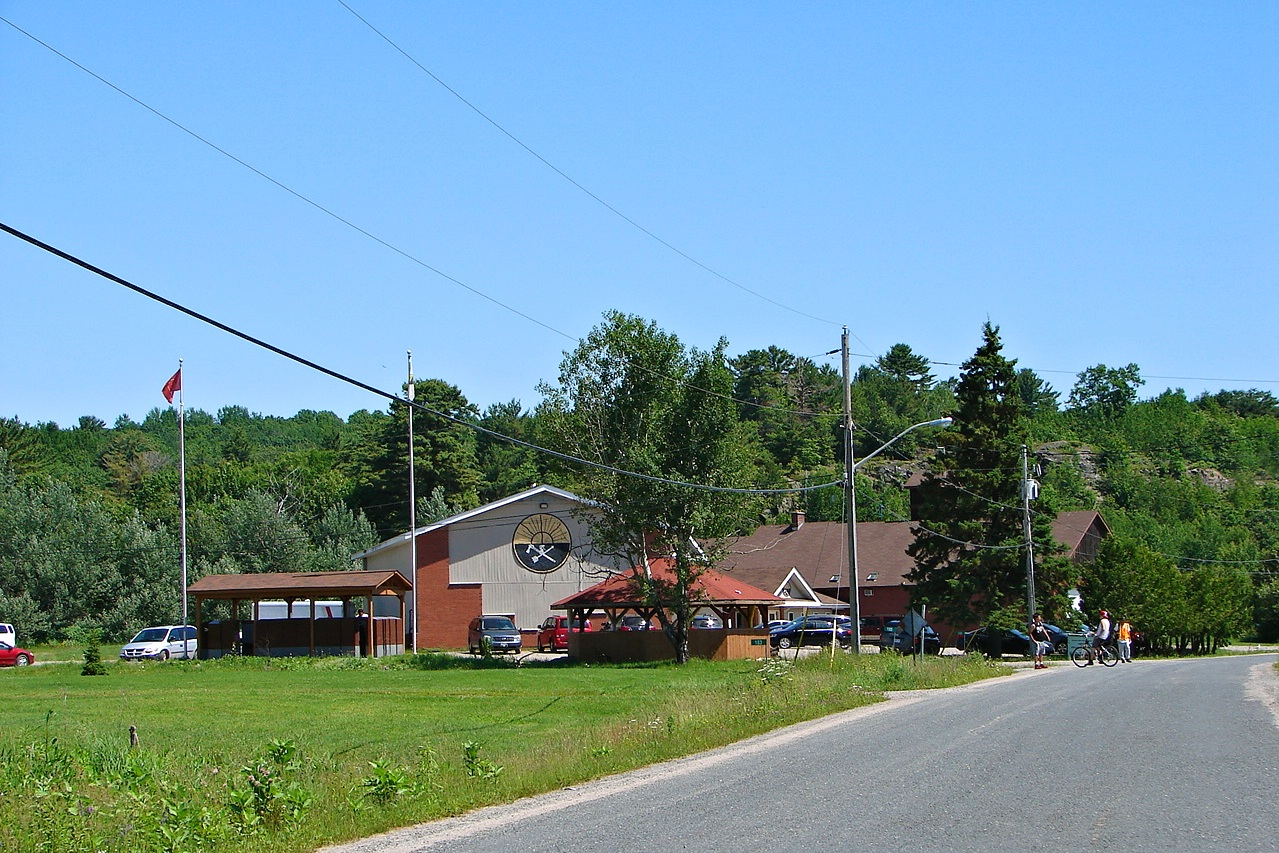
Serpent River First Nation

The area is the traditional territory of the Serpent River First Nation and also part of the Huron Robinson Treaty land.

In 2021, the Serpent River nation representatives described community consultation about mining activities as "minor."

=== 19th century ===
Known at the time as the Blind River area, the Elliot Lake area is situated between the Sudbury Nickel mining area and the abandoned Bruce Mines and was subsequently prospected for gold and copper during the 19th century.

Uranium was first discovered in Canada by John Lawrence LeConte in 1847, who named the new mineral coracite. The exact location of his first discovery was unclear, but was understood to be approximately 70 miles north of Sault Ste. Marie on the shore of Lake Superior. A lack of an exact location and the absence of radioactivity detectors resulted in failures of surveyors or prospectors to repeat his find.

=== Mid 20th century – uranium discovery ===
In 1948, Karl Gunterman, financed by Aime Breton, with a Geiger counter discovered radioactive conglomerate near Lauzon Lake in Long Township, Ontario. Their discovery was investigated by geologist Franc R. Joubin, who in 1952 found a uranium deposit in Spragge.

In 1953, Joubin persuaded Joseph H. Hirshhorn to finance exploratory drilling and Hirshhorn signed a contract with Eldorado Mining and Refining Ltd, the Canadian Crown Corporation that bought all uranium in Canada; together they quickly started the Pronto Mine. News of the mine and the 1,400 stakes claimed by Joubin and Hirshorn resulted in a rush of prospectors to the area who filed 8,000 claims that summer. The uptick in uranium staking was known as the Backdoor Staking Bee. Mapping by W. H. Collins of the Geological Survey of Canada led to the discovery of more uranium around Quirke Lake and Elliot Lake (the lake proper, not the town of the same name). By 1958, Eldorado Mining and Refining Ltd estimated that the area had 320 million tons of uranium ore, with on average 2.38 pounds of uranium oxide per ton.

Throughout the 1950s, the majority of the world's uranium came from Elliot Lake, which became known as the "Uranium Capital of the World".

1957 saw bustling activity as contractors blasted paths through rock to make roads, sinking shafts and building uranium processing mills. According to the University of Waterloo's Earth Sciences Museum, "Never before in the history of Canada has so much money been spent so quickly in one place."

The homelands of the Anishinaabe people; lake Elliot on border of pink (Chippewa) and green (Odawa)

Throughout the 1950s, the people of the Anishinaabek First Nation of the Serpent River were systematically excluded from all decisions about resource extraction in their area.

=== Late 1950s boom ===
1958 was the first full year of mining production, and saw a $200 million of uranium sales, making uranium Canada's number one metal export, and Elliot Lake Canada's largest producer.

From 1959 to 1960, Elliot Lake organized town was created and other mines were constructed to meet the growing US demand for uranium.

In November 1959, the US announced its plans to stop stockpiling uranium and to cease procurement after 1962, resulting in the closure of five mines in 1960.

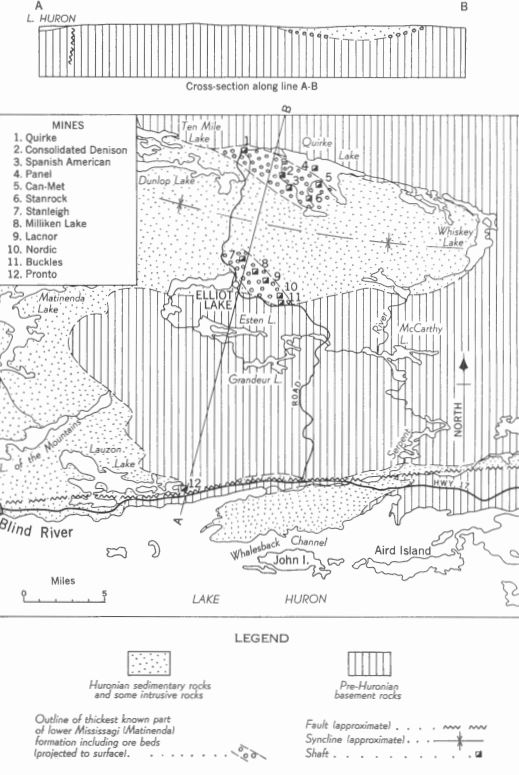
Elliot Lake Mine Map, 1962

However, by 1966 the global demand for uranium for energy purposes prompted increased production in the area, by 1970 the area had produced $1.3 billion of uranium oxide. Mining companies funded the creation of a Nuclear Museum.

The mines all started producing between 1955 and 1958, supplying US military needs.

=== 1960s drop in demand ===
When the United States Atomic Energy Commission declared in 1959 that it would no longer stockpile uranium, and not renew procurement contracts beyond 1963, seven of the remaining nine mines closed. The other two mines, Denison and Nordic, remained open to supply Canadian federal uranium stockpiling needs while Pronto switched activities to supporting the nearby Pater copper mine. At the same time, Rio Algom Limited was created and became the owner of the seven closed mines, plus the Nordic and Pronto mines.

The mine closure resulted in the population of Elliot Lake town dropping from about 24,877 to 6,000 residents, having an immediate negative impact on the local economy.

Rio Algom later became a subsidiary of BHP.

=== 1970s onwards ===
In early 1972, Australia, France, South Africa, and Rio Tinto Zinc formed a cartel to control the supply and pricing of uranium, using price fixing and bid rigging. This continued until the cartel was exposed by Friends of the Earth Australia in 1976.

The growing demand for uranium for nuclear power stations being built in the 1970s promoted Rio Algom to increase production at Quirke Mine and reopen Panel Mine in 1979 and later Stanleigh Mine (1983).

Decommissioning started from 1992 and concluded in 2001 when vegetation was added to Pronto Mine. Today, all mines are now fully decommissioned, meaning that mine openings are closed up, all buildings are removed and the sites have been revegetated.

Ontario Hydro cancelled its contract to buy uranium from Rio Algom in 1990 and from Denison Mines in 1992, although Stanleigh Mine continued production until June 1996.

Currently, Rio Algom owns nine of the mines (Stanleigh, Quirke, Panel, Spanish, American, Milliken, Lacnor, Buckles and Pronto) and Denison Mines owns the others.

As of 1980, Elliot Lake supplied 90% of the uranium used in Ontario.

== Mining process ==
Mined ore consisted of pyritized quartz conglomerate with 0.1% to 0.2% uranium. The ore was acid leached to extract the uranium using sulphuric acid.

Tailings were neutralized before being deposited, however exposed tailings released acid and radium-226 before barium chloride and lime treatment was started in the 1970s.

== Individual mines ==
=== Buckles Mine ===
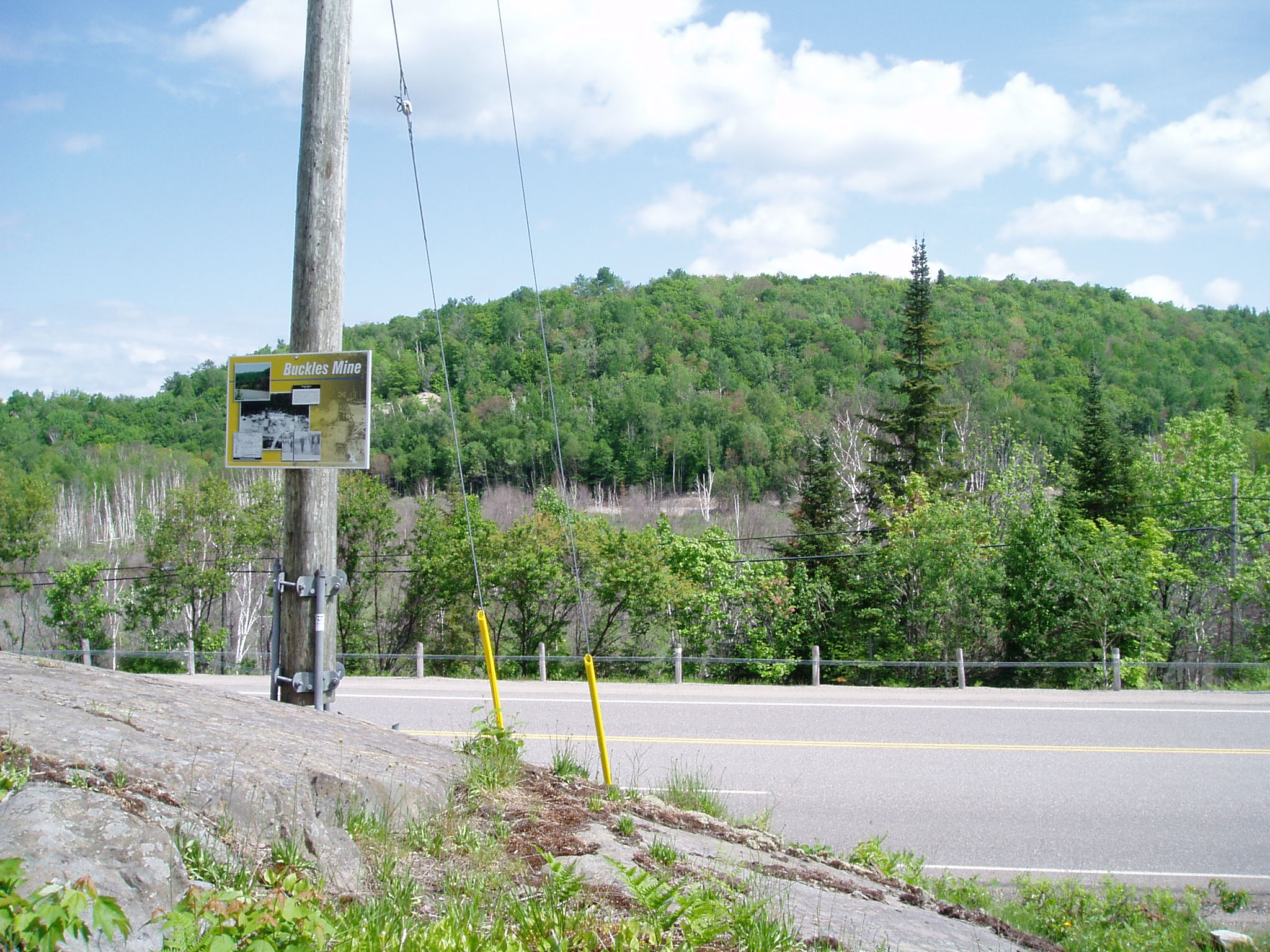
The site in 2006

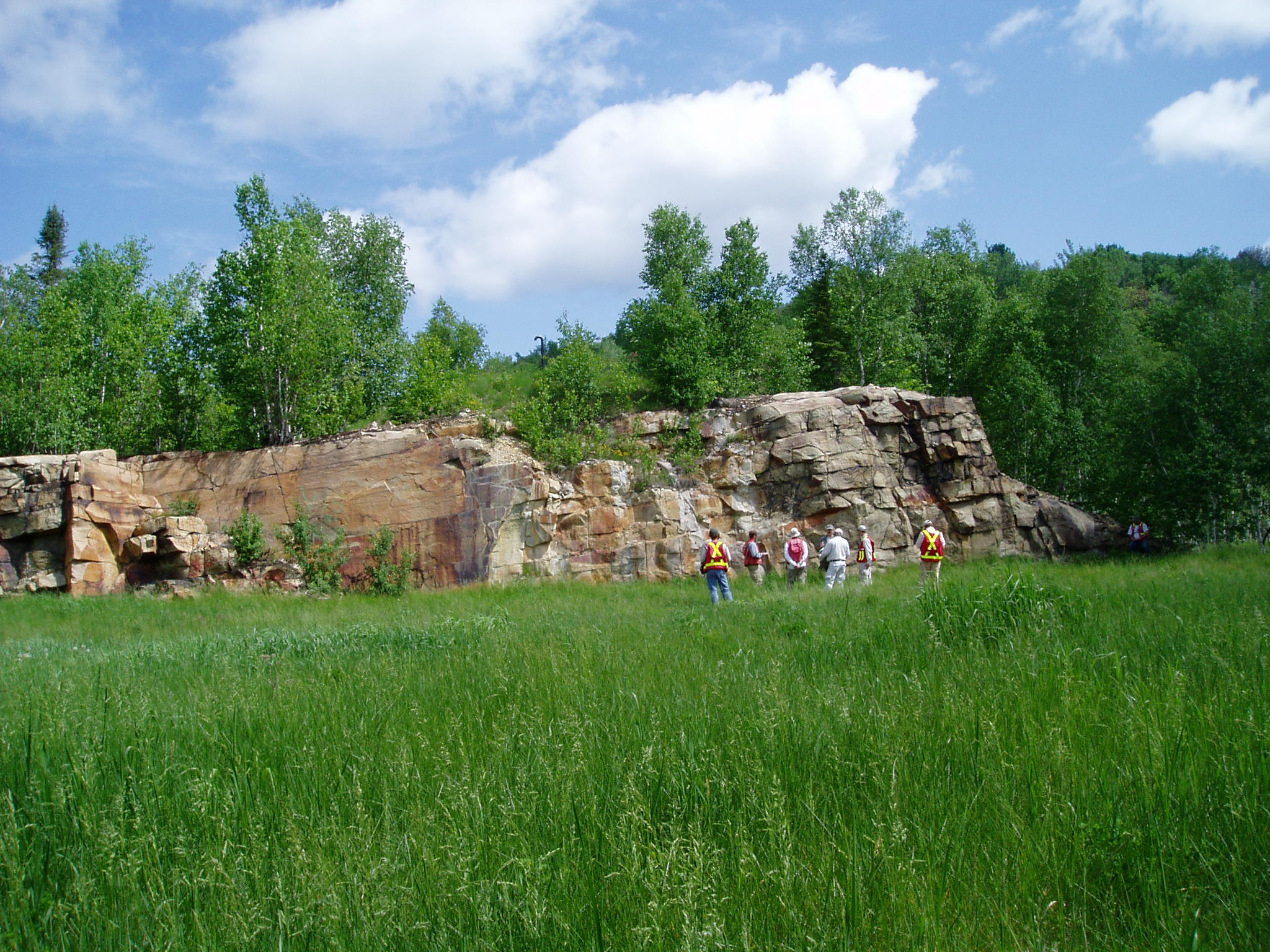
Buckles Mine in 2006

Buckles mine is located on the south of the Quirke Lake syncline, close to the Nordic Mine. In 1955, Spanish American Mines Limited bought the mine from the original owner of the claim, Buckles Algoma Uranium Mines Limited.

The uranium ore was reported to be 486,500 tons, at 0.124% U_{3}O_{8}, located in a ten-feet-thick zone, 75 feet below the surface.

From 1958 onwards ore from the mine was processed at the Spanish American mine, where it was transported and treated at rate of approximately 500 tons per day. The mine closed in 1958 after all the ore had been extracted.

Twelve Mt of ore remains on the shared tailing management area with Nordic Mine under vegetative cover.

=== Can-Met Mine ===
Can-Met's location was first staked by Carl Mattaini who sold it to Can-Met Explorations Limited. The 1958 reporting indicated 8,362,069 tons of ore, which included 6,642,380 tons of uranium ore, with a partly proven average uranium grade of 1.832 pounds of uranium oxide per ton, after dilution. The mine is located on the south shore of Quirke Lake, 15 miles from Elliot Lake.

The mine had two shafts to 2,127 and 2,395 feet. There was a processing plant that could process 3,000 tons of ore per day built in October 1957. Tailings were deposited in the natural basin south of the mill.

=== Denison Mine ===
Denison Mine (also known as Consolidated Denison Mine) is located 10 miles north of Elliot Lake. It is just south of the Quirke Mine, and just west of the Panel and Can-Met Mines, just north of Spanish American and Stanrock mines. Following successful staking of the Pronto Mine property, mining claims were staked un the summer of 1953 by F. H. Jowsey, A. W. Stollerty and Associates. These stakes were purchased by Consolidated Denison Mines Limited in 1954. Denison undertook geological surveys and diamond drilling.

The mine started in September 1957, and there was mill on site to process 6,000 tons per day. The average production was 2,676 tons per day and the ore milled had an average of 2.63 pounds of uranium oxide per ton. 1957 estimates of ore reserves were of 136,787,400 tons above another zone 100-feet lower.

63 million tons of tailings were deposited in Williams Lake, Bear Cub Lake, and Long Lakes. The mine was decommissioned by Denison Mines in 1997.

=== Lacnor Mine ===
Lacnor Mine (also known as Lake Nordic Mine) is located on the south limb of the Quirke Lake syncline, four miles from Elliot Lake. It is located just north of Nordic Mine, and just east of Miliken Mine and just south of Stanleigh Mine. It was purchased by Northspan Uranium Mines, a subsidiary of Rio Tinto.

Diamond drilling started in 1954, which found ore. Two shafts were sunk and a processing plant with 3,800 tons per day was constructed. 1957 reports indicated an ore reserve of 8,289,207 tons that produced an average of 0.101% uranium oxide. Tailings were deposited in the valley east of the mill.

The mine closed in 1960 and was decommissioned from 1997 to 2000. 2.7 Mt of tailings remain on site

=== Miliken Lake Mine ===
Miliken Lake Mine is located approximately one mile from Elliot Lake. The site is bounded on the west and the south by Nordic Mine, and on the north by Stanleigh Mine and on the east by Lake Nordic Mine. The property was first staked in 1953 and purchased by Miliken Lake Uranium Mines Ltd in 1954, before being sold to Rio Tinto in 1956.

Production started in 1958; a 3,000-ton-per-day ore processing mill was constructed on site. A 1957 report indicated 7,269,846 tons of ore with an average grade of 0.098% uranium oxide on site, with possible an extra 14 to 18 million tons more.

Tailings were deposited in Crotch Lake and Sherriff Creek. The mine closed in 1964 and was decommissioned from 1997 to 2000. 0.08 Mt of tailings remains on site underwater.

=== Nordic Mine ===
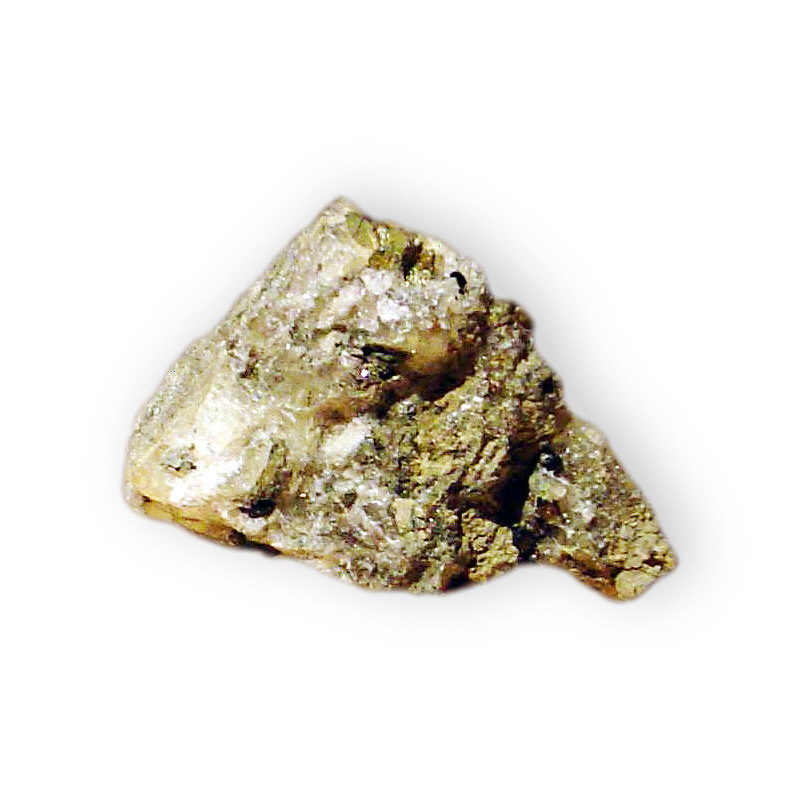
Thucholite in Calcite Hydrocarbon from Nordic Mine

Nordic Mine is located 3 miles east of Elliot Lake, it is bounded by the Quirke Mine to the north. It was first staked in 1953 by prospectors working for two companies: Technical Mine Consultants and Preston East Dome. Once uranium was discovered, the Algom Uranium Mines Company was formed, which had control over Nordic Mine and the Quirke Mine property.

A mining shaft was sunk in 1955 and production started in January 1957. There was a processing plant with a 3,000 tons per day capacity built on site. The mine was bought by Rio Tinto. 1958 estimates of ore reserves on site were of 11,258,000 tons with an average grade of uranium oxide of 2.65 pound per ton.

Tailings were deposited in the swamp and in the valley north of the mill where they remain with the tailings from Buckles Mine, covering a 115.6 hectares. The mine closed in 1968.

=== Panel Mine ===
The Panel Mine is located 13 miles north of Elliot Lake, on the north limb of the Quirke Lake syncline. The site is bordered to the west by the Quirke Mine and Denison Mine and on south by Can-Met Mine. The site was staked in 1953 by Emerald Glacier Mines Ltd purchased by Panel Consolidated Uranium Mines Ltd 1955, before being sold to Northspan Uranium Mines Limited, a Rio Tinto subsidiary.

Two shafts were sunk on site to depth of 1,102 and 1,250 feet and a processing plant with 3,000 tons per day capacity was built on site. Production started in 1958. A 1956 estimate of ore reserves on site was 6,033,000 tons with an average grade of 2.12 pounds of uranium oxide per ton.

Tailings were deposited in the nearby swamp and in the south west corner of Strike Lake.

The mine closed in 1961, but reopened in 1979 and operated until 1990. It was decommissioned from 1992 until 1996. 16 Mt of tailings remain on site underwater. The spillways of the dams that hold back the tailings were modified since closure.

=== Pronto Mine ===
Pronto Mine was the original mine in the Elliot Lake/Blind River area. Pronto Mine is located in Long Township, 11 miles east of Blind River, close to Ontario Highway 17 and the Canadian Pacific Railway.

It has a main shaft sunk that was deepened in 1958 and an ore processing plant with 1,250 tons per day capacity upgraded in 1958 to 1,500 tons per day. Tailings were deposited in the nearby valley and swamp north of the mill.

When the demand for uranium subsided, the mine switched to copper production, closing in 1970. 4.4 Mt of tailings remain on site covering 44.7 hectares, the tailing have vegetated cover.

=== Quirke Mine ===
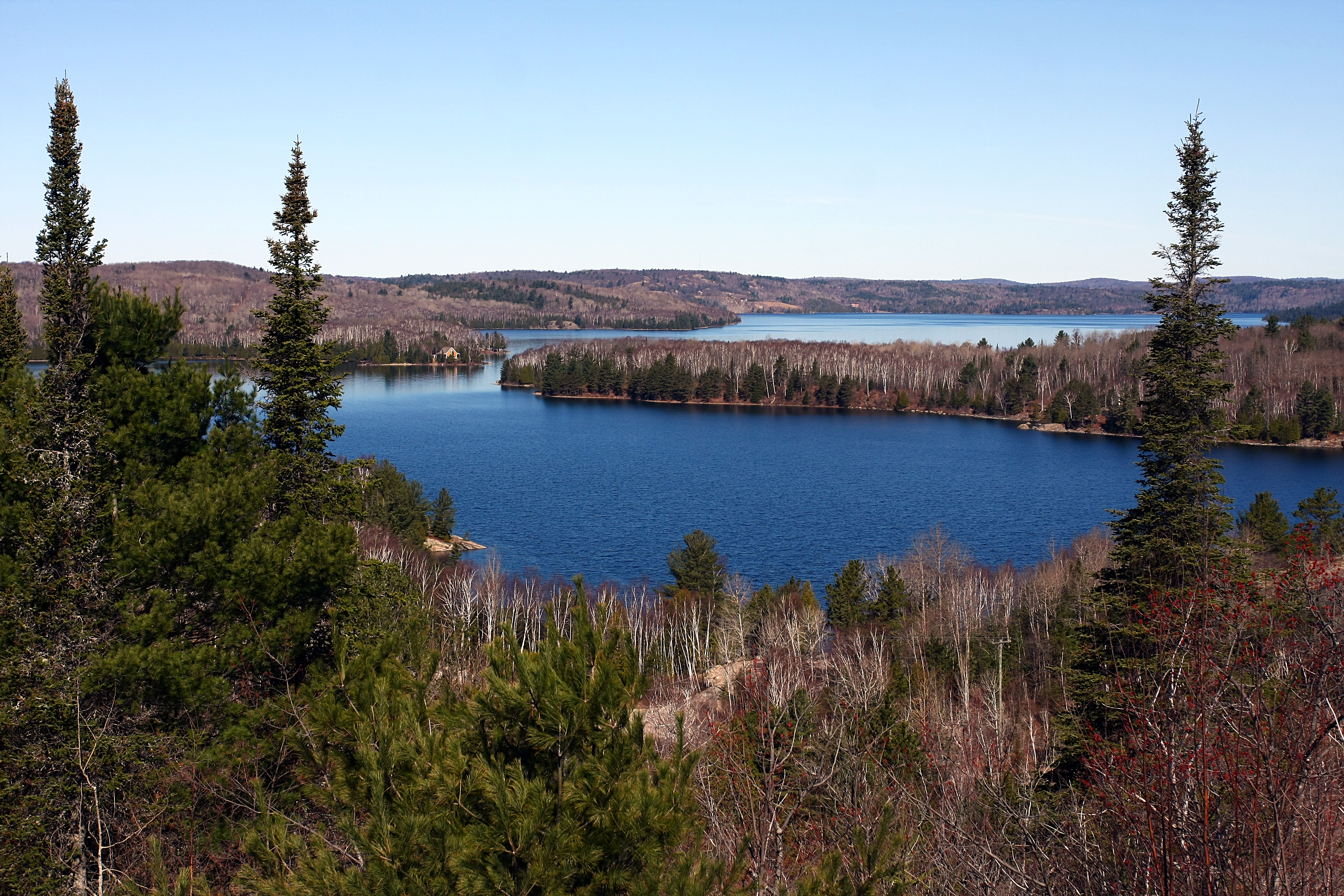
Quirke Lake

Quire Mine was owned by Algom Uranium Mines Limited and is located 9 miles north of Elliot Lake, and about 2.5 miles west of the northwest edge of Quirke Lake. The property was first staked in 1953, trenching and sampling was also done the same year. An 864 feet deep shaft was started in 1954 and finished in 1955 and a processing mill with 3,000 tons per day capacity was built on site. Production started in 1956.

The company's 1957 annual report indicates 17,942,000 tons of ore reserves, of which 1,409,000 tons had an average grade of 2.31 pounds of uranium oxide per ton.

Tailings were deposited in Manred Lake, west of the mill.

The mine closed in 1961, but reopened in 1968 and operated until 1990. It was decommissioned from 1992 until 1996. The spillways of the dams that hold back the tailings were modified since closure. 46 Mt of tailings remain on site, in tiered underwater cells, covering an area of 183.5 hectares.

=== Spanish American Mine ===
The Spanish American Mine is located 9 miles northeast of Elliot Lake, on the north limb of the Quirke Lake trough. It is bounded on the east by Stanrock Mine and on the north by Denison Mine. The location was first staked by P Westerfield who sold the stake to Spanish American Mines Limited, who subsequently sold them to Northspan Uranium Mines Ltd, a Rio Tino subsidiary.

The site had two shafts that are 3,200 and 3,400 feet deep and an ore processing plant with 2,000 tons per day capacity. Production started in May 1958. A 1957 report estimated 6,251,726 tons of ore with an average grade of 0.097% uranium oxide. Tailings were deposited in Northspan Lake.

The mine closed in 1959 due to water ingress after only 79,000 tons of ore were extracted. It was decommissioned from 1992 to 1996. 0.5Mt of tailings remain on site, underwater covering 13.2 hectares.

=== Stanleigh Mine ===
Stanleigh Mine is located 2 miles northeast of Elliot Lake and was first staked by H. S. Strouth, the chief of mining of Standard Ore and Alloys Corporation, later Stanleigh Uranium Mining Corporation. Ownership was subsequently transferred to Miliken Lake Uranium Mines and Northspan Uranium Mines Limited (who owned Lacnor Mine).

Two shafts were started in April 1956 to a depth of 3,415 and 3,690 feet deep, the deepest of all shafts in the Elliot Lake group of mines. Tailings were deposited in Crotch Lake.

The mine closed in 1960, but reopened from 1983 until 1996. In August 1993, a power failures resulted in a 2 million liter spill of contaminated water from the mine into McCabe Lake. The Atomic Energy Control Board laid two charges against Rio Algom. It was decommissioned from 1997 until 2000. 20.5 Mt of tailings remain on site under water covering an area of 376.5 hectares.

In 2017, the Canadian Nuclear Safety Commission found owners Rio Algom to be operating the mine "below expectations" due to radium releases from the decommissioned mine's effluent treatment plant that exceeded allowable limits specified in the operators license.

=== Stanrock Mine ===
Stanrock Mine is located 14 miles from Elliot Lake on the south side of Quirke Lake. The site is adjacent to the Can-Met Mine to the east, the Spanish-American Mine to the west, and Denison Mine to the north. The site was initially known as the Z-7 group and owned by Zenmac Metal Mines Ltd, who sold it to the US Stancan Uranium Mines Limited in 1954. In 1995 and 1996 the new owners found uranium via diamond drilling and creating a processing plant with a 3,300 tons per day capacity. 1956 estimates of ore reserves were 5,077,800 tons with a grade of 0.109% uranium oxide with probably 4 million additional tons unconfirmed.

Tailings were deposited in the naturally occurring basin south of the mill, along with the tailings of Can-Met mine. Six million tons of tailings remain on site. The mine was decommissioned by Denison Mines in 1999.

== Health ==
=== Pollution, environmental, and ecological health ===
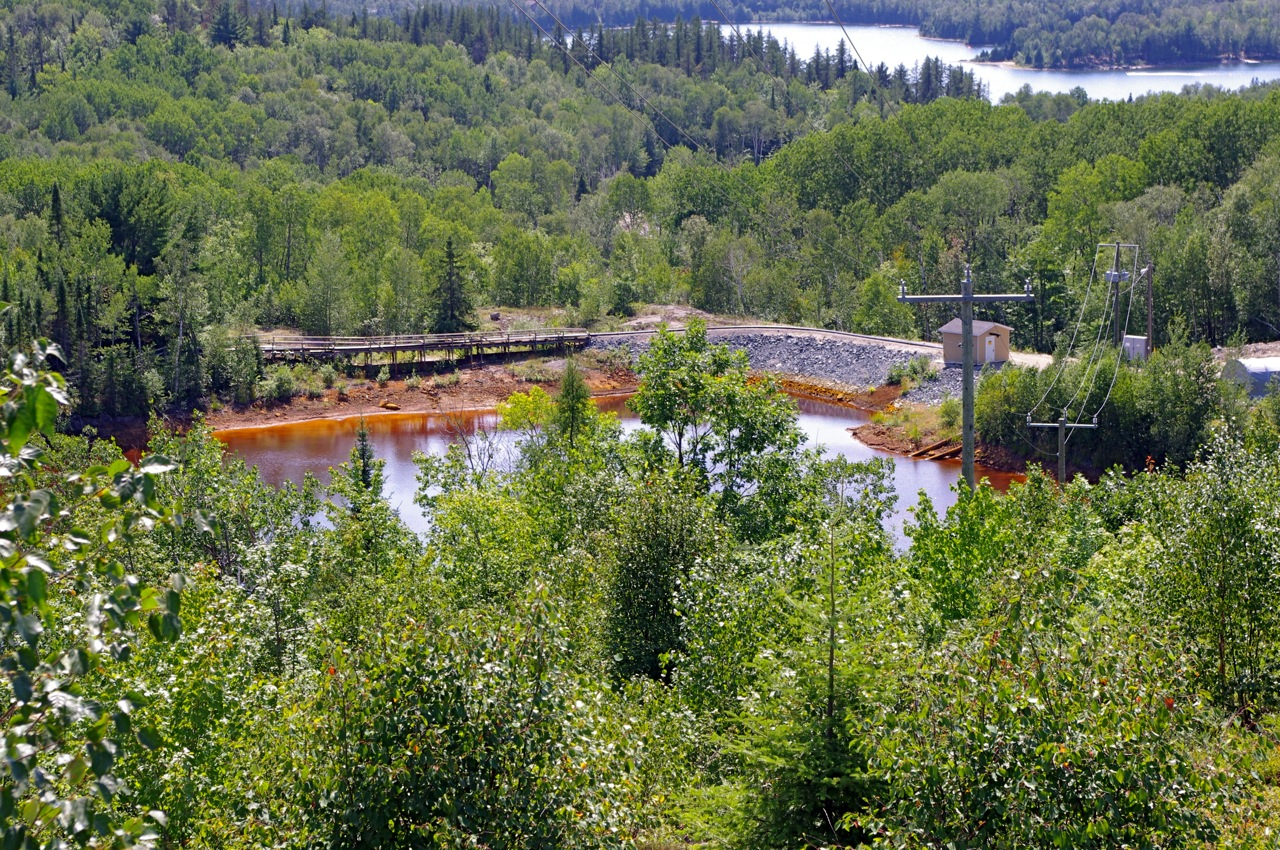
A former mine in Elliot Lake, photographed in 2010

The health of the watershed in the area deteriorated as mining started. Trout from nearby lakes released an odour when cooked and female fish stopped releasing eggs. Fishing remained permitted at both Quirke Lake and Whiskey Lake, despite the radioactivity in them exceeding levels deemed tolerable by the Ontario Waterways Commission. Terry Jacobs, an elder of the Serpent River First Nation, told Anishinabek News in 2022 that pollution from the mines reduced the number of animals in the area. Other community members reported sulphur fires, dangerous sulphuric dust burning roofs, breathing difficulties, and skin rashes on children who swam in the rivers. By 1976, 20 years after the start of mining, Health and Welfare Canada advised local residents to stop drinking water from local rivers. In 1987, band member Gertrude Lewis requested action from the Government of Canada to clean up the pollution, but the request was rejected.

Just before Canada Day 1988, the Serpent River nation transported waste from the mines to the TransCanada Highway. On July 20, 1988, the Government of Canada agreed to construct a treatment plant.

The 2022 book Serpent River Resurgence by Lianne C. Leddy documents the impacts of uranium mining on Serpent River First Nation.

102 million tonnes of tailings remain on eights decommissioned mines coving an area of 920 hectares. Rio Algom (a BHP subsidiary) and Denison Mines are both licensed by the Canadian Nuclear Safety Commission to operate the decommissioned mines.

Results from 2015 and 2018 independent environmental monitoring, commissioned by the Canadian Nuclear Safety Commission, report no expected environmental impacts. 2021 reports from the Serpent River First nation report the environmental damage as ongoing, with members unable to use their land or eat local fish.

There are twelve decommissioned uranium mines around Elliot lake, ten of which have tailings on site.

Current status of Elliot Lake Mines
Mine	GPS (Decimal)	Operating Period	Decommissioning	Tailings (Megatonnes)	Tailings (Hectares)	Tailings (Coverage)	Current licensee
Buckles Mine	46.376083, −82.589094	1957–1968	1997–2000	12*	114.6*	Vegetation	Rio Algom
Can-Met Mine	46.477631, −82.545847	1957–**	**	**	**	**	Denison Mines
Denison Mine	46.495597, −82.600236	1957–**	1992–1996	63	**	Water	Denison Mines
Lacnor Mine	46.395075, −82.607917	1957–2000	1997–2000	2.7	31.6	Vegetation	Rio Algom
Mililken Mine	46.403581, −82.627806	1958–1964	1997–2000	0.08	23.1	Water	Rio Algom
Nordic Mine	46.379906, −82.586442	1957–1968	1997–2000	12*	114.6*	Vegetation	Rio Algom
Panel Mine	46.383333, −82.633333	1958–1961 1979–1990	1992–1996	16	131.7	Water	Rio Algom
Pronto Mine	46.21, −82.71	1958–1970	1997–2000	4.4	44.7	Vegetation	Rio Algom
Quirke Mine	46.5112, −82.6321	1956–1961 1968–1990	1992–1996	46	183.5	Water	Rio Algom
Spanish American Mine	46.476067, −82.584858	1958–1959	1992–1959	0.5	13.2	Water	Rio Algom
Stanleigh Mine	46.413519, −82.63735	1958–1960 1983–1996	1997–2000	20.5	376.5	Water	Rio Algom
Stanrock Mine	46.472333, −82.559825	1958–1964	**	6	**	Vegetatation	Denison Mines

*Combined total for Nordic and Buckles

**Unknown or unclear

=== Cancer risks ===
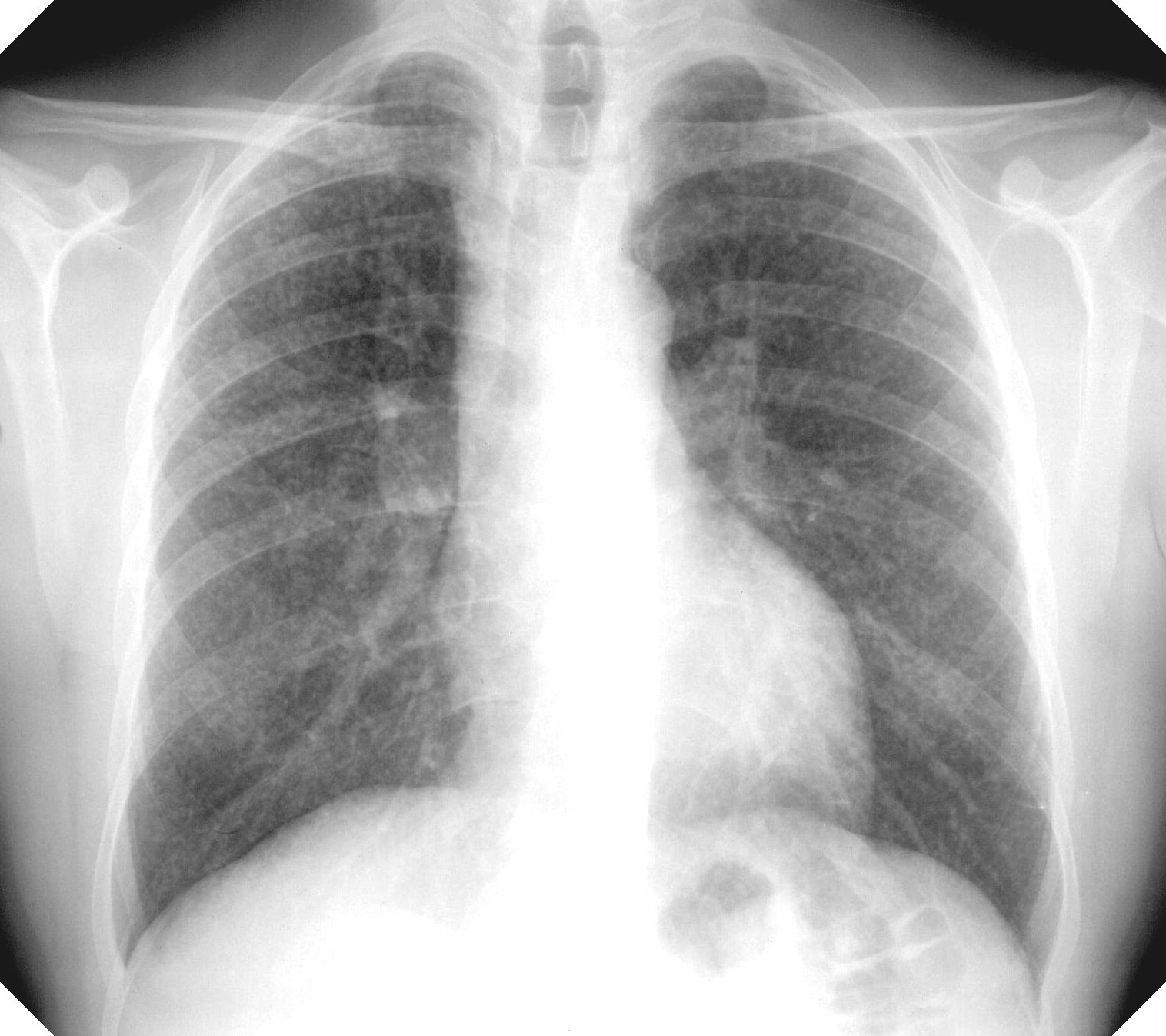
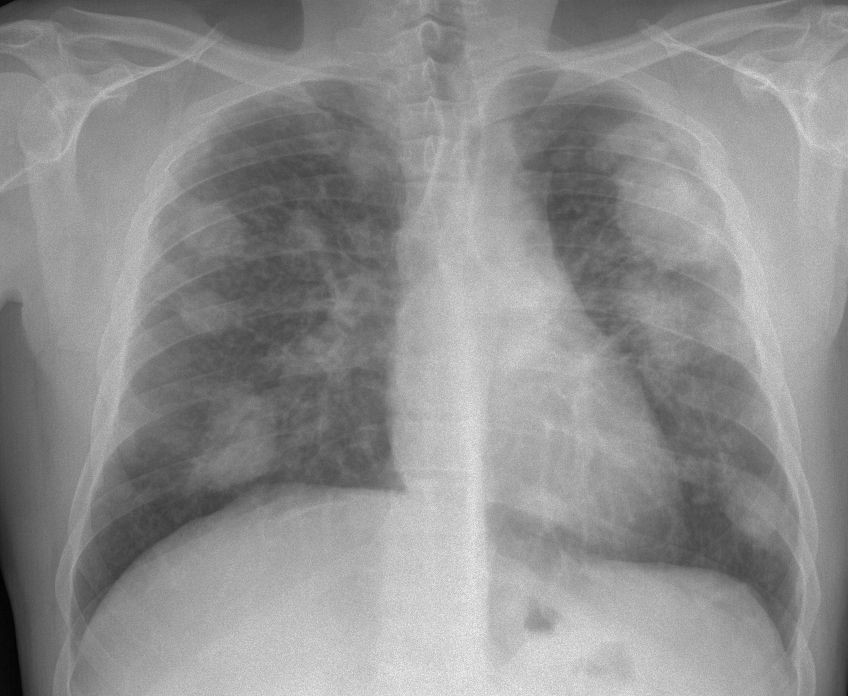
X-rays of patients with simple silicosis (top) and complicated silicosis (bottom)

According to a 2012 study published in Nature, there is a "positive exposure-response between silica and lung cancer".

Uranium mining around Elliot Lake produced silica-laden dust at a free silica rate of 60–70%.

By the early 1970s, miners were unionized via the United Steelworkers and were growing increasingly concerned about the prevalence of cancers and poor support for sick workers by mine owners.

In 1974 union representatives learned of learned about a paper presented by the Ontario Ministry of Health that contained details about cancer risks to uranium miners, that had not been shared with the miners.

Approximately 1,000 miners who worked at Denison Mine went on a wildcat strike on the 18 April 1974. Ten days later Denison Mines agreed to improve conditions and the Ontario Premier commissioned James Milton Ham to lead a Royal Commission on the Health and Safety of Workers in Mines.

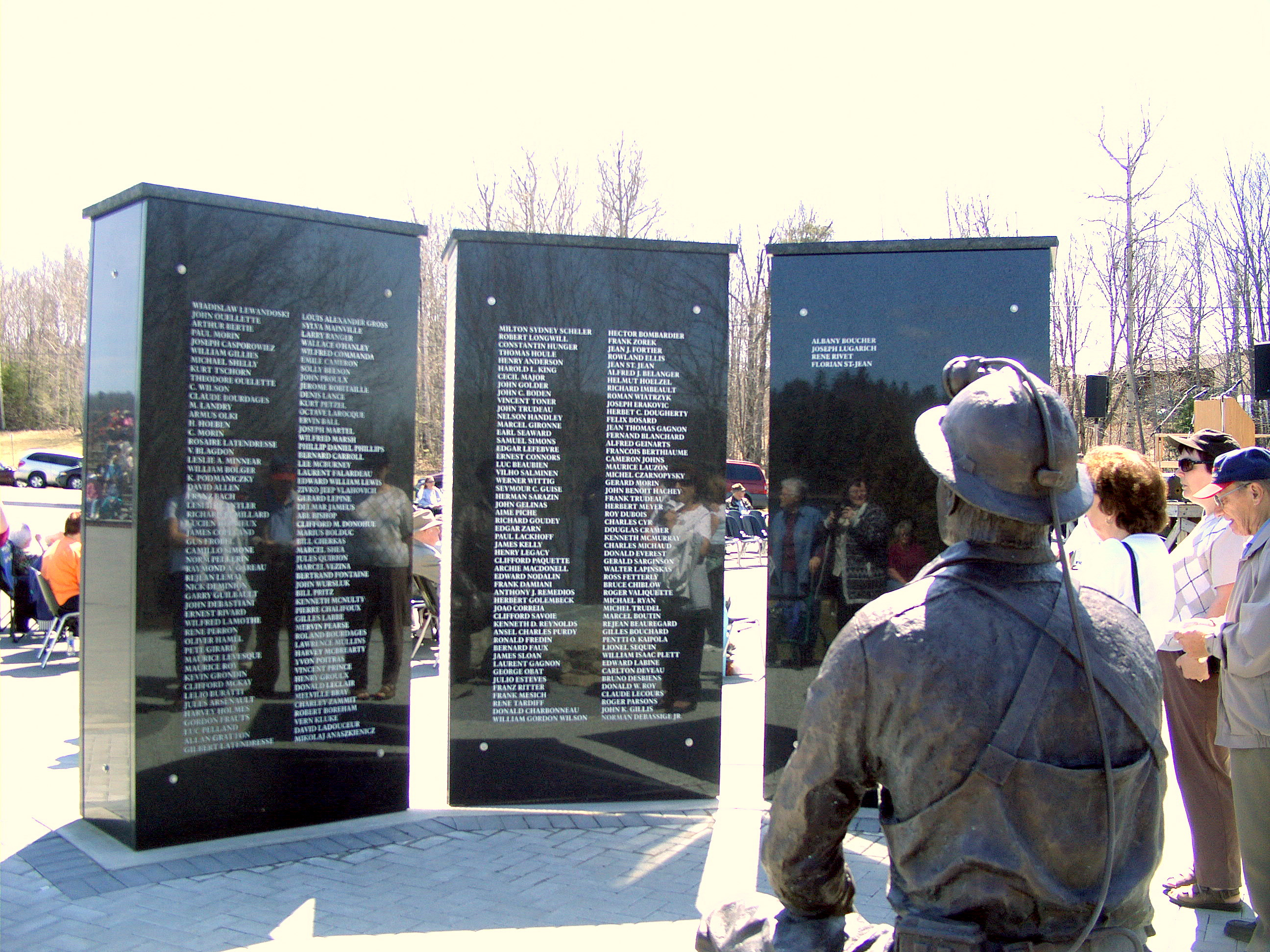
The Miner's Memorial is a tribute to the mining history of Elliot Lake, ON. This part is a tribute to all the miners who died as a result of working in the uranium mines.

The same year, the Ontario Workmen's Compensation Board studied 15,094 people who worked in the uranium mines around Elliot Lake and Bancroft for at least one month, between 1955 and 1974. Of those 15,094 people, 94 silicosis cases were found in 1974, of which 93 were attributed to working in an Elliot Lake mine. According to the Committee on Uranium Mining in Virginia, mines produce radon gas which can increase lung cancer risks. Miners' exposure to radiation was not measured before 1958 and exposure limits were not enacted until 1968. Risks to miners were investigated and the official report of that investigation quotes an Elliot Lake miner:

"We have been led to believe through the years that the working environment in these mines was safe for us to work in. We have been deceived."

The aforementioned 1974 study of 15,094 Ontario uranium miners found 81 former miners who died of lung cancer. Factoring in predicted lung cancer rate for men in Ontario, led to the conclusion that by 1974 there were 36 more deaths than expected attributable to both Elliot Lake and Bancroft mines, with the additional risk appearing to be twice as high for Bancroft miners compared to Elliot Lake miners.

A study report for the CNSC undertaken by the Occupational Cancer Research Centre at Cancer Care Ontario tracked the health of 28,959 former uranium miners over 21 years and found a two-fold increase in lung cancer mortality and incidence. The BMJ (journal of the British Medical Association) reported an increase of lung cancer risk; miners who have worked at least 100 months in uranium mines have a twofold increased risk of developing lung cancer. The study is to be updated in 2023.

Between the minutes opening and 1980, there were 77 fatal workplace safety incidents in the Elliot Lake mines.

== See also ==
- Uranium mining in the Bancroft area (Ontario's other main uranium mining area)
- Agnew Lake Mine (nearby uranium mine)
- Uranium ore deposits
- List of uranium mines
- List of uranium mines in Ontario
- List of mines in Ontario
