= Uranium mining in Canada =

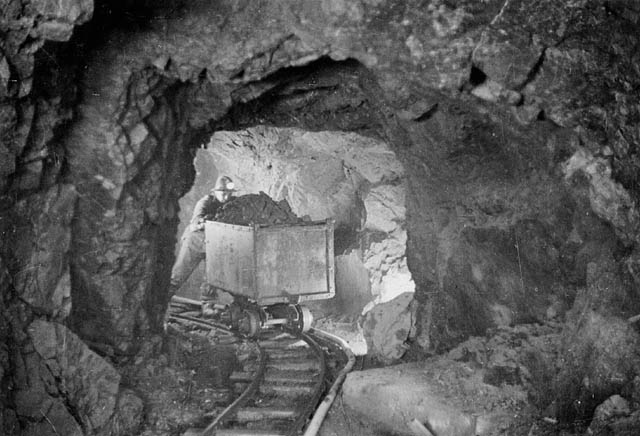
A miner hauling a car of silver radium ore, 340 feet below the surface, Eldorado Mine of Great Bear Lake circa 1930

Canada is the world's second-largest producer of uranium, behind Kazakhstan. In 2009, 20% of the world's primary uranium production came from mines in Canada. 14.5% of the world production came from one mine, McArthur River. Currently, the only producing area in Canada is northern Saskatchewan, although other areas have had active mines in the past.

== History ==
=== Discovery of uranium ===
Canada's first recorded discovery of uranium was likely in 1847, when pitchblende, a major uranium-bearing mineral, was found at Theano Point, Lake Superior by B. A. Stanard, and described by geologist J. L. LeConte in the American Journal of Science. In 1948, the location was re-discovered by Bob Campbell, and developed in 1949 by Camray Mines Ltd. A 45 metre shaft was sunk and 150 metres of drifting was done. The mine was not profitable and was abandoned before going into full production.

Canada's first commercially important uranium discovery was in 1930, when prospector Gilbert LaBine discovered pitchblende on the shores of the Great Bear Lake in the Northwest Territories. This discovery led Labine's company, Eldorado Gold Mines Limited, to develop the Eldorado Mine at Port Radium, Northwest Territories, in 1932 and a refinery to extract radium from the ore in Port Hope, Ontario, the following year. The refinery was run by Marcel Leon Pochon, an ex-student of Pierre Curie, who had travelled to Port Hope after having spent the last 20 years at South Terras Mine in Cornwall, United Kingdom.

=== Post World War II demand ===
During World War II, the demand for uranium exploded as the United States and its allies, Britain and Canada, began the Manhattan Project to produce the first atomic weapons. As a result, in 1943, the Government of Canada expropriated the assets of Eldorado and formed a federal crown corporation, Eldorado Mining and Refining Limited, to oversee Canadian uranium assets. Exploration for uranium was restricted to Eldorado and the Geological Survey of Canada.

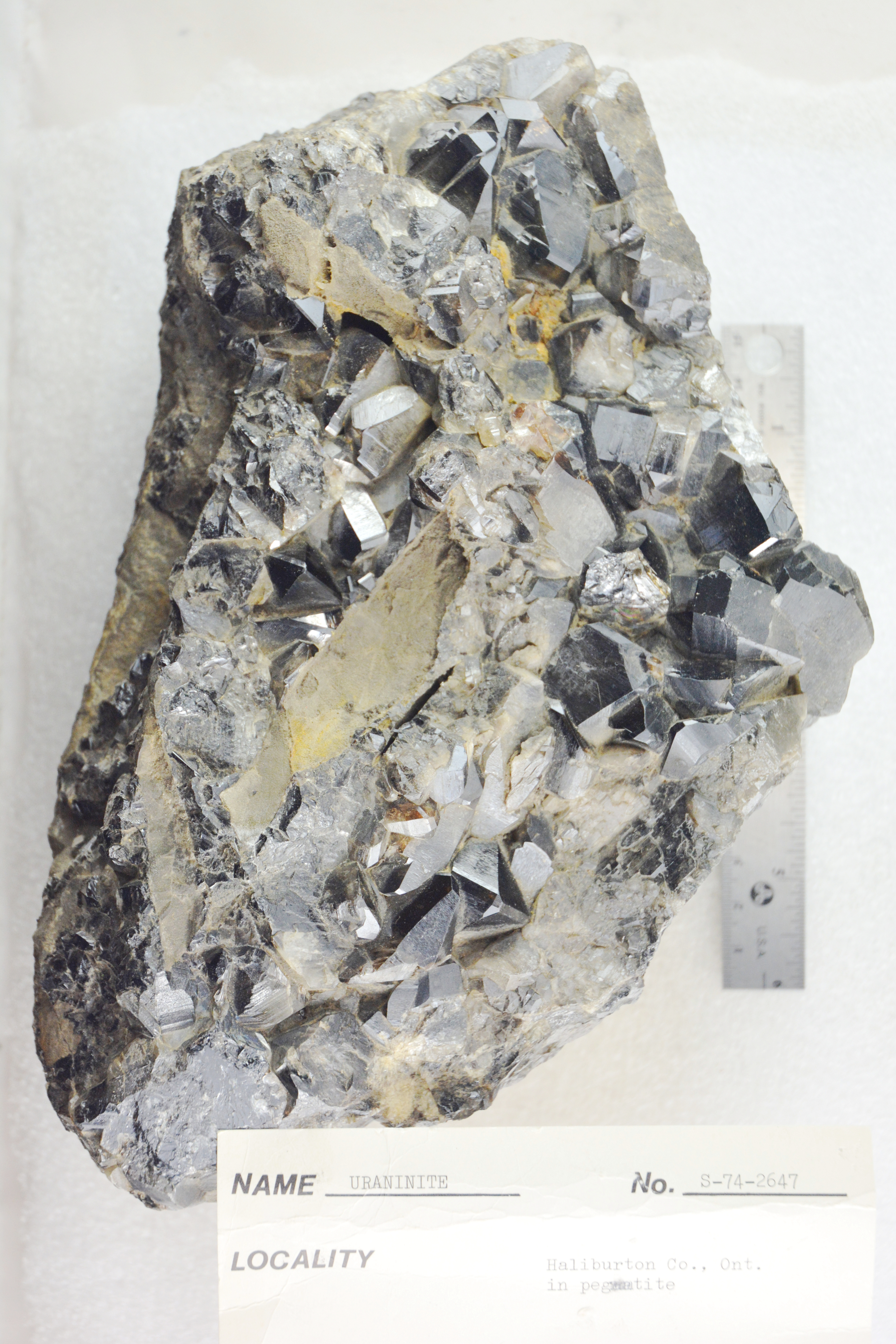
Uraninite in pegmatite rock, from Ontario

The ban on private prospecting was lifted in 1947. This led to an exploration boom that quickly resulted in the discovery of mines in the Northwest Territories (Rayrock), Ontario (Bancroft and Elliot Lake), and Saskatchewan (Uranium City). By 1956, thousands of radioactive occurrences had been noted, and by 1959, 23 mines were in operation in five districts. In 1959, Canadian uranium exports were valued at $330 million, more than for any other mineral exported from Canada that year. In the early 1960s, military demand for uranium declined, and in 1965, Canada imposed a policy of only selling uranium for peaceful purposes. This period marked the end of the first uranium boom and saw the number of operating mines drop to four. To assist the domestic uranium industry, the federal government initiated a stockpiling program to purchase uranium. This program ended in 1974, when demand for uranium for power generation was sufficient to support the industry.

=== Mine safety ===
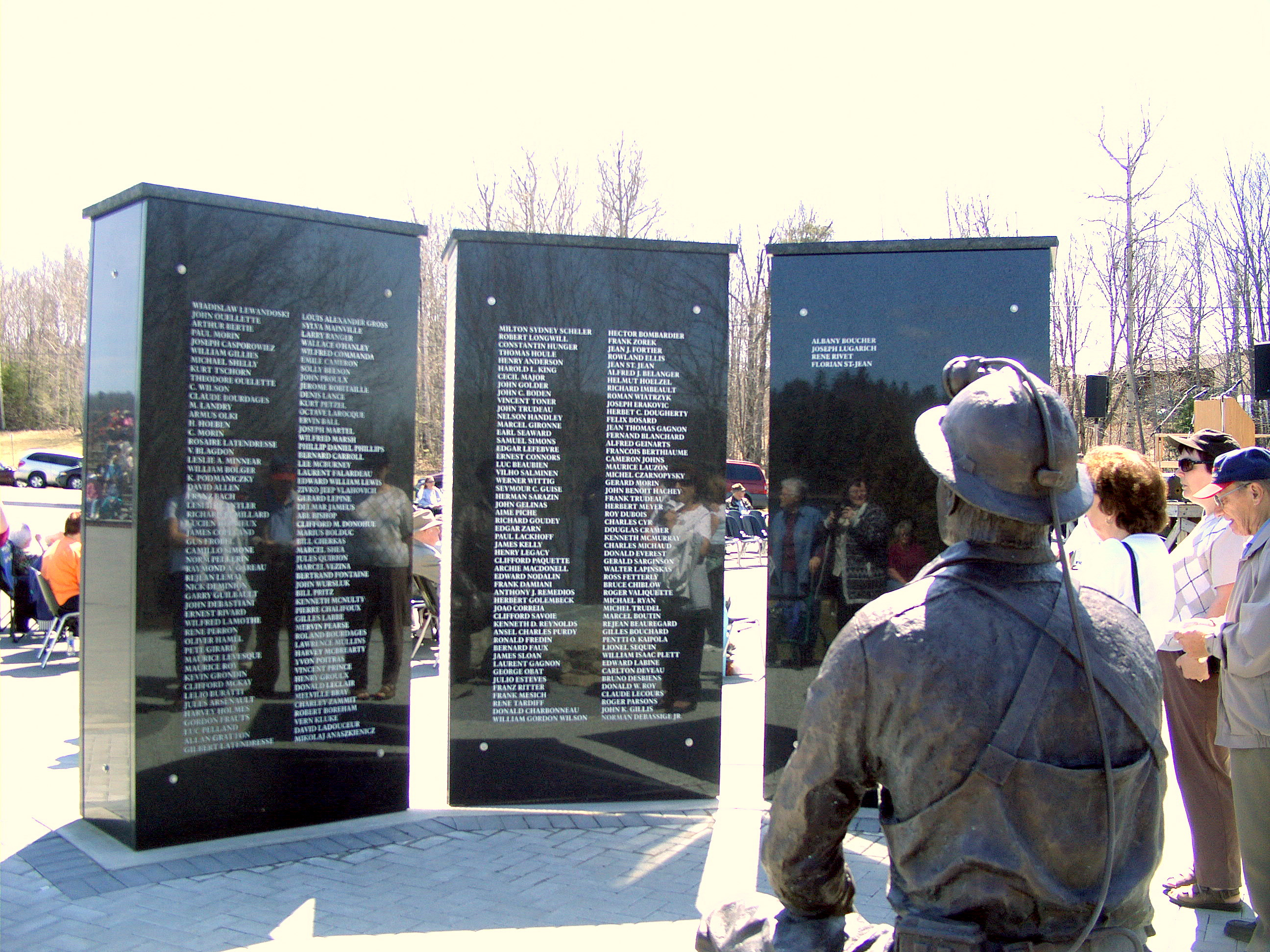
The Miner's Memorial, Elliot Lake

Poor working conditions in Elliot Lake mines led to the 1974 Elliot Lake miners strike, which prompted the government to initiate the Royal Commission on the Health and Safety of Workers in Mines. Recommendations from the Royal Commission influenced occupational safety legislation for mines and other industries to this day.

== Uranium mining by province ==
=== Nova Scotia ===
A moratorium on uranium exploration was declared in the province of Nova Scotia in 1981, with a legislative ban enacted in 2009. The ban on uranium exploration was repealed in 2025.

=== Quebec ===
On March 28, 2013, Quebec became the third province in Canada to impose a moratorium on uranium development. This ban appears to be temporary.

=== Ontario ===
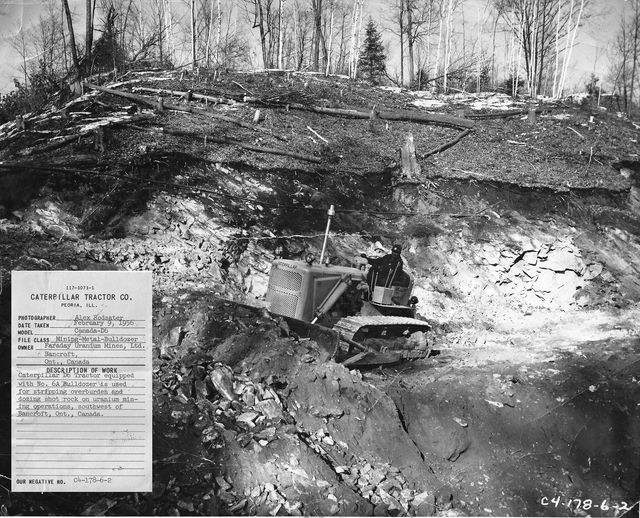
Caterpillar tractor with a bulldozer at Faraday Mine, bear Bancroft, 1956

Uranium was first discovered in the area of Cardiff, Ontario, in 1922 by W. M. Richardson at a location first called "the Richardson deposit" and later known as "the Fission property". Between 1929 and 1931, attempts were made to extract radon from the uranium ore.

In 1943, in the aftermath of World War II, as global interest in mining uranium escalated, the government sent geologists, who concluded at the time that they were not viable due to accessibility, size and uranium concentration.

1948 saw an increase in private staking for uranium in Ontario, but due to the difficulties in extracting uranium from lower grade ore, none developed into mines. In 1953 "intelligence prospecting and excellent preliminary explorations" by G. W. Burns and R. J. Steele discovered the Central Lake deposits (which later were developed into Bicroft Mine) and Arthur Shore (whose prospect became the Faraday Mine) led the way successful prospecting.

Messrs. Burns, Steele and Shore were three of one hundred area prospects were established in the Bancroft area between 1953 and 1956. At the same time, another ten mines were started in the Elliot Lake area.

Major uranium mines and deposits in Ontario

Active mine
Deposit/possible future minesite
Closed mines/plants

City/town

==== Decommissioned mines at Elliot Lake and Agnew Lake area ====
- Stanleigh Mine (1956–1960 and 1982–1996)
- Spanish American Mine (1957–1959)
- Can-Met Mine (1957–1960)
- Milliken Mine (1957–1964)
- Panel Mine (1957–1961 and 1978–1990)
- Denison Mine (1957–1992)
- Stanrock Mine (1958–1960 and 1964–1985)
- Quirke Mine(s) (1955–1961 and 1965–1990)
- Pronto Mine (1955–1970)
- Buckles Mine (1956–1960)
- Lacnor Mine "Lake Nordic" (1956–1960)
- Nordic Mine (1956–1970)
- Agnew Lake Mine (1977–1983)

==== Decommissioned mines in Bancroft area ====
- Faraday/Madawaska Mine (1954–1964 and 1975–1982)
- Bicroft Mine (1967–1963)
- Greyhawk Mine (1957–1959 and 1976–1982)
- Dyno Mine (1958–1960)

=== Saskatchewan ===
Major uranium mines and deposits in Saskatchewan

Active mine
Deposit/possible future minesite
Closed mines/plants

City/town

==== Past producers ====
- Key Lake
- Cluff Lake mine
- Rabbit Lake Mine
Beaverlodge district
- Gunnar Mine
- Lorado Mine
- Eldorado, Beaverlodge Operation (Ace, Fay, etc.)
- Cinch Lake Mine

==== Current Mines ====
- McArthur River uranium mine
- McClean Lake mine
- Cigar Lake Mine

=== British Columbia ===
In 1980 the province of British Columbia introduced a seven-year ban on uranium mining and exploration, which was not renewed. In 2008, the government established a "no registration reserve" under the Mineral Tenure Act for uranium and thorium. This excludes uranium and thorium from any mineral licences in the province. The government has also stated that they will "ensure that all uranium deposits will remain undeveloped".

=== Northwest Territories ===
==== Past Producers ====
- Eldorado Mine (1932–1940 and 1943–1960)
- Rayrock Mine (1957–1959)

== Tailings ==
In 2016, there were 217,817,839 tonnes of uranium tailings in Canada. About 201 million tonnes were located at decommissioned uranium mining sites and about 17 million tonnes were located at active sites. The inventory or uranium tailings were held as follows:

- 99.4 million tonnes (46%) Rio Algom
- 69.6 million tonnes (32%) Denison Mines
- 30.9 million tonnes (14%) Cameco
- 5.2 million tonnes (2%) Orano Canada
- 4.7 million tonnes (2%) Saskatchewan Research Council
- 4.6 million tonnes (2%) EWL Management Limited (since 2022, merged into Ovintiv)
- 2.0 million tonnes (1%) Barrick Gold
- 0.5 million tonnes (0%) Ministry of Energy, Northern Development and Mines

== See also ==
- Nuclear power
- Manhattan Project
- Anti-nuclear movement in Canada
- Canada's Deadly Secret: Saskatchewan Uranium and the Global Nuclear System (2007 book)
- South Terras mine, Cornwall (where much of the radium refining techniques were developed)
