= List of uranium mines in Canada =

The following is a list of uranium mines and mills, including former uranium mines:

== Ontario ==
Area	Name	Location	Owner	Years operating
Bancroft	Bicroft Mine	near Bancroft	Barrick Gold	1957–1963
Bancroft	Dyno Mine	Cardiff	Ovintiv	1958–1960
Bancroft	Fission Mine	Cardiff		1920s–1940s
Bancroft	Greyhawk Mine	near Bancroft	Ovintiv	1957–1959, 1976–1982
Bancroft	Madawaska Mine (previously Faraday Mine)	Faraday	Ovintiv	1954–1964, 1975–1982
Elliot Lake	Agnew Lake Mine	Hyman Township	Kerr Addison Mines Ltd.	1977–1983
Elliot Lake	Buckles Mine	near Elliot Lake	Rio Algom	1957–1958
Elliot Lake	Can–Met Mine	near Elliot Lake	Denison Mines	1957–1960
Elliot Lake	Denison Mine	near Elliot Lake	Denison Mines	1957–1992
Elliot Lake	Lacnor Mine	near Elliot Lake	Rio Algom	1957–1960
Elliot Lake	Milliken Mine	near Elliot Lake	Rio Algom	1958–1964
Elliot Lake	Nordic Mine	near Elliot Lake	Rio Algom	1956–1990
Elliot Lake	Panel Mine	near Elliot Lake	Rio Algom	1958–1990
Elliot Lake	Pronto Mine	near Spragge	Rio Algom	1956–1970
Elliot Lake	Quirke Mine	near Elliot Lake	Rio Algom	1956–1990
Elliot Lake	Spanish American Mine	near Elliot Lake	Rio Algom	1958–1959
Elliot Lake	Stanleigh Mine	near Elliot Lake	Rio Algom	1958–1996

== Saskatchewan ==
Name	Location	Owner
Gunnar Mine	25 km S.W. of Uranium City	Saskatchewan Research Council
Lorado Mine	8 km south of Uranium City	Saskatchewan Research Council
Cluff Lake Mine	75 km south of Lake Athabasca	Orano Canada
Beaverlodge Mine	Eldorado	Cameco
Cigar Lake Mine	Athabasca Basin	Cameco
McArthur River uranium mine	Athabasca Basin	Cameco
McClean Lake mine	Athabasca Basin	Orano Canada

== Northwest Territories ==
Name	Location	Owner	References
Port Radium idle mine site	Port Radium	Department of Indian Affairs and Northern Development	
Rayrock idle mine site	On the south side of Maryleer Lake and the north shore of Fault Lake, 169km N.W. of Yellowknife and 74km N.W. of Rae	Department of Indian Affairs and Northern Development	
