= List of uranium projects =

Uranium production is carried out in about 13 countries around the world, in 2017 producing a cumulative total of 59,462 tonnes of uranium (tU). The international producers were Kazakhstan (39%), Canada (22%), Australia (10%), Namibia (7.1%), Niger (5.8%), Russian Federation (4.9%), Uzbekistan (4.0%), China (3.2%), United States (1.6%), Ukraine (0.9%), India (0.7%), South Africa (0.5%) and Pakistan (0.1%). Since 2009 the in-situ leach (ISL) mining operations in Kazakhstan have been producing the largest share of world uranium.

The largest conventional uranium mines are Cigar Lake and McArthur River (Canada); Ranger and Olympic Dam (Australia); Krasnokamensk (Russia) and Rossing (Namibia). The largest uranium producers are Cameco, Rio Tinto, Areva, KazAtomProm and ARMZ-TVEL.

The production methods employed are conventional underground and open cast (50%) and in-situ leaching (50%). About 50 uranium production centers are operational.

== Viable projects ==
Argentina
Mine	Location	Main owner	Year discovered	Year commenced	Grade %U	Annual production (tOre)	Annual production (tU)	Type of mine
Don Otto	Salta	Globe Uranium	1958		0.15			Presently shut down
Cachocira (Cactite)			1999		0.3	340		OC
Engenlio (Cactite)				2006				OC
Australia(See Uranium mining in Australia)
Mine	Location	Main owner	Year discovered	Year commenced	Grade %U	Annual production (tOre)	Annual production (tU)	Type of mine
Four Mile	South Australia	General Atomics	2005	2014	0.37		2,064 (2019)	ISL
Olympic Dam	South Australia	BHP	1975	1988	0.05	9,100,000	4,356	UG
Ranger	Northern Territory	ERA	1969	1980	0.2	2,000,000	5,544	OC, mining ceased, processing stockpiled ore
Beverley	South Australia, in the northern Flinders Ranges	Heathgate Resources	1969	1999	0.18	N.A.	1064	ISL, production suspended in 2013
Brazil
Mine	Location	Main owner	Year discovered	Year commenced	Grade %U	Annual production (tOre)	Annual production (tU)	Type of mine
Caetité	Lagoa Real province, Bahia State	Indústrias Nucleares do Brasil	1977	1999	0.25		400	OC
Canada
Mine	Location	Main owner	Year discovered	Year commenced	Grade %U	Annual production (tOre)	Annual production (tU)	Type of mine
Cigar Lake	Saskatchewan	Cameco	1981	2005	15.41	52,424 (2016)	8,650	UG
McArthur River/Key Lake	Saskatchewan	Cameco	1988	1999	6.58	93,750 (2016)	9,000	UG
McClean Lake	Saskatchewan	Orano Canada	1979	1999	2.4		2490	OC
China
Mine	Location	Main owner	Year discovered	Year commenced	Grade %U	Annual production (tOre)	Annual production (tU)	Type of mine
							750 (est)	
Chenxian	Hunan Province	China National Nuclear Corporation						
712 Uranium Mine	Hunan Province							
Fuzhou Hangjian	Fujian Province							
Tengchong	Yunnan Province							ISL
Yining	Xinjiang Autonomous Region							ISL
Chongyi	Shaanxi Province							
Lantian	Shaanxi Province							
Quinglong field	Liaoning Province							
Benxi	Liaoning Province				0.34			
Czech Republic
Mine	Location	Main owner	Year discovered	Year commenced	Grade %U	Annual production (tOre)	Annual production (tU)	Type of mine
Dolní Rožínka		Diamo					408	UG
France
Mine	Location	Main owner	Year discovered	Year commenced	Grade %U	Annual production (tOre)	Annual production (tU)	Type of mine
							2 (2015)	byproduct of rare earth element production
Germany
Mine	Location	Main owner	Year discovered	Year commenced	Grade %U	Annual production (tOre)	Annual production (tU)	Type of mine
Königstein	Königstein, Saxony	Wismut	1963	1967			77	closed, production from mine water treatment
India
Mine	Location	Main owner	Year discovered	Year commenced	Grade %U	Annual production (tOre)	Annual production (tU)	Type of mine
Jaduguda	Jharkhand	UCIL		1967			2300+ (est)	UG
Bhatin	Jharkhand	UCIL		1967			1230	UG
Narwapahar	Jharkhand	UCIL		1995		1050		UG
Turamdih	Jharkhand	UCIL		2002			1730	UG
Tummalapalle	Andhra Pradesh	UCIL	1989 (?)			0.05		UG
Iraq
Mine	Location	Main owner	Year discovered	Year commenced	Grade %U	Annual production (tOre)	Annual production (tU)	Type of mine
Akashat								
Kazakhstan
Mine	Location	Main owner	Year discovered	Year commenced	Grade %U	Annual production (tOre)	Annual production (tU)	Type of mine
Tortkuduk		Kazatomprom-Areva					2600	ISL
Stepnoye		Kazatomprom					1570	ISL
Tsentralnoye		Kazatomprom					1000	ISL
Western group		Kazatomprom					900	ISL
Malawi
Mine	Location	Main owner	Year discovered	Year commenced	Grade %U	Annual production (tOre)	Annual production (tU)	Type of mine
Kayelekera	near Karonga	Lotus Resources		2009	0.08		1400	OC, Production Suspended 2014
Namibia
Mine	Location	Main owner	Year discovered	Year commenced	Grade %U	Annual production (tOre)	Annual production (tU)	Type of mine
Rössing	Namib Desert	Rio Tinto	1928	1976	0.03–0.05	12,030,000	1,569	OC
Langer Heinrich	Namib Desert	Paladin Energy	1973	2007	0.06–0.07		1,903.5	OC
Husab	Namib Desert	China General Nuclear Power Group and China-Africa Development Fund	2008	2015	0.039			OC
Niger
Mine	Location	Main owner	Year discovered	Year commenced	Grade %U	Annual production (tOre)	Annual production (tU)	Type of mine
Akouta.		Areva/Onarem	1967	1974	0.46		1778	UG
Arlit(Arlette)		Areva/Onarem	1965	1971	0.3		1315	OC
Pakistan
Mine	Location	Main owner	Year discovered	Year commenced	Grade %U	Annual production (tOre)	Annual production (tU)	Type of mine
Dera Ghazi Khan		PAEC					+2200(est)	
Issa Khel / Kubul Kel	Miniawali District							
Tuman Leghari	South Punjab							
Romania
Mine	Location	Main owner	Year discovered	Year commenced	Grade %U	Annual production (tOre)	Annual production (tU)	Type of mine
	Carpaţii Orientali (zona de nord)	Compania Naţională a Uraniului					70(est)	
Russia
Mine	Location	Main owner	Year discovered	Year commenced	Grade %U	Annual production (tOre)	Annual production (tU)	Type of mine
Krasnokamensk	Krasnokamensk, Zabaykalsky Krai	ARMZ	1963	1968	0.38		3431(est)	UG
South Africa
Mine	Location	Main owner	Year discovered	Year commenced	Grade %U	Annual production (tOre)	Annual production (tU)	Type of mine
Vaal River gold operations		AngloGold Ashanti			0.033		600 (2012)	UG, byproduct of gold production
Ukraine
Mine	Location	Main owner	Year discovered	Year commenced	Grade %U	Annual production (tOre)	Annual production (tU)	Type of mine
Vatutininski and Ingulskyi		VostGOK					800(est)	UG
United States (See Uranium mining in the United States)
Mine	Location	Main owner	Year discovered	Year commenced	Grade %U	Annual production (tOre)	Annual production (tU)	Type of mine
Crow Butte	Nebraska	Cameco	1980	1991		_	363	ISL
Daneros	near Fry Canyon, Utah	Energy Fuels	1975	2009	0.26	37,900	97.4 (2012)	UG, on standby 2012
Smith Ranch-Highland	near Douglas, Wyoming	Cameco	1972/1988* *ISL operations		_		590	ISL
Vasquez	South Texas	Westwater Resources	2004		_		360	ISL
Alta Mesa	Texas, Brooks County	Mesteña Uranium					385* *annual capacity	ISL
Uzbekistan
Mine	Location	Main owner	Year discovered	Year commenced	Grade %U	Annual production (tOre)	Annual production (tU)	Type of mine
	Uchkuduk	Navoi GMK	1952	1961			2700 (2012)	ISL

== Potentially viable projects ==
Argentina
Mine	Location	Main owner	Year discovered	Scheduled Commencement	Grade %U	Planned Annual production (tOre)	Planned Annual production (tU)	Type of mine
Sierra Pintada		CNEA						UG
Cerro Solo					0.3			
Hataia					0.08		680	Co-product with phosphoric acid
Australia
Mine	Location	Main owner	Year discovered	Scheduled Commencement	Grade (%U)	Planned Annual production (tOre)	Planned Annual production (tU)	Type of mine
Jabiluka	Northern Territory	ERA	1971		0.43		2290	UG
Honeymoon	75 km NW of Broken Hill, New South Wales	Boss Resources	1972	unknown	0.07	ISR	1500	ISL, production suspended in 2013
Canada
Mine	Location	Main owner	Year discovered	Scheduled Commencement	Grade %U	Planned Annual production (tOre)	Planned Annual production (tU)	Type of mine
Midwest Uranium Mine	Saskatchewan	Areva Resources Canada Inc.	1978		4.4			OC
Kiggavik Uranium Project	Nunavut	Areva Resources Canada Inc.			0.41			UG
Millennium Uranium Deposit	Saskatchewan	Cameco			3.9			
India
Mine	Location	Main owner	Year discovered	Scheduled Commencement	Grade %U	Planned Annual production (tOre)	Planned Annual production (tU)	Type of mine
Mohuldih	Jharkhand	UCIL						UG
Baghjata								UG
Bandugurang								UG
Lambapur-Peddagattu								UG
Kylleng-Pyndemsohiong-Mawthabah (formerly Domiasiat)	Meghalaya							OC
Iran
Mine	Location	Main owner	Year discovered	Scheduled Commencement	Grade %U	Planned Annual production (tOre)	Planned Annual production (tU)	Type of mine
Saghand 1 & 2	Yazd province							
Bandar Abbas					0.2			
Kazakhstan
Mine	Location	Main owner	Year discovered	Scheduled Commencement	Grade %U	Planned Annual production (tOre)	Planned Annual production (tU)	Type of mine
Southern mining group		Kazatomprom						ISL
North Stepnoye group		Kazatomprom						ISL
Central Mynkuduk and South Inkai		Kazatomprom						ISL
Budenovskoye		Kazatomprom						ISL
West Mynkuduk		Kazatomprom						ISL
East Mynkuduk		Kazatomprom						ISL
Akdal	Chu-Sarysu district	Kazatomprom			0.06			ISL
Inkai Uranium Project	Chu-Sarysu district	Cameco			0.06			ISL
South Inkai Project	Chu-Sarysu district	Uranium One			0.04			ISL
Budenovskoye	Chu-Sarysu district	Kazatomprom						ISL
Munkuduk (Mynkuduk)	Chu-Sarysu district	Kazatomprom			0.04			ISL
West Mynkuduk	Chu-Sarysu district	Kazatomprom						ISL
Zarechnoye	Syr-Darya district	Kazatomprom			0.11			
Korsan	Kyzyl-Orda district	Kazatomprom						ISL
Russia
Mine	Location	Main owner	Year discovered	Scheduled Commencement	Grade %U	Planned Annual production (tOre)	Planned Annual production (tU)	Type of mine
Khiagda	Buryatia	TVEL						UG
Priargun	Chita region	TVEL						UG
USA
Mine	Location	Main owner	Year discovered	Scheduled Commencement	Grade %U	Planned Annual production (tOre)	Planned Annual production (tU)	Type of mine
Sweetwater	Wyoming	SXR Uranium One						ISL

== Non-viable projects ==
Algeria
Mine	Location	Main owner	Year discovered	Probable commencement	Grade %U	Probable annual production (tOre)	Probable annual production (tU)	Probable type of mine
Timgaouine								
Abankor								
El-Bema								
Ait-Oklan								
Tahaggart	Southern Tassili							
Asseo								
Argentina
Mine	Location	Main owner	Year discovered	Probable commencement	Grade %U	Probable annual production (tOre)	Probable annual production (tU)	Probable type of mine
Los Berthos			1954					
Los Adobes	Patagonia							
Dr Baulier			1968					
Cerro Condor								
Laguna Colorada								
Las Termas								
Figueira								
Australia
Mine	Location	Main owner	Year discovered	Probable commencement	Grade %U	Probable annual production (tOre)	Probable annual production (tU)	Probable type of mine
Koongarra	Alligator Rivers of the Northern Territory, 30 km south of Ranger and 3 km east of Nourlangie Rock	Areva	1970		0.8			
Browns	Rum Jungle, near Batchelor, Northern Territory	Compass Resources NL	1965		0.05			
Angela	25 km south of Alice Springs	Cameco (operator)	1973		0.13			
Bigrlyi	Northern edge of the Ngalia Basin in NT	Energy Metals Ltd	1982		0.14			
Mount Gee	North Flinders Ranges	Marathon Resources			0.05			
Curnamona	North of Honeymoon Uranium Mine–East Kalkaroo	Curnamona Energy						
Crocker Well and Mt Victoria	In the Olary area of SA (Curnamona province)	PepinNini Minerals Ltd	1951		0.05–0.48			
Prominent Hill	130 km SE of Coober Pedy, South Australia	OZ Minerals	2001		103 ppm			
Kintyre	Rudall region of Western Australia	Cameco	1985					
Yeelirrie	Between Wiluna and Leinster, WA, about 500 km north of Kalgoorlie	Cameco	1972		0.15			
Mulga Rock	250 km north east of Kalgoorlie	Vimy Resources	1979		0.13			
Manyingee	In the northern part of the Carnarvon Basin, 85 km south of Onslow in Western Australia	Paladin Energy	1974		0.12			
Oobagooma	75 km northeast of Derby in Western Australia	Paladin Energy			0.15			
Lake Way and Centipede	Close to Wiluna, 750 km north east of Perth	Nova Energy	1972		0.1			
Lake Maitland	At Lake Maitland, 100 km SE of Wiluna	Mega Uranium			0.03			
Valhalla	40 km north of Mount Isa	Paladin	1954		0.14			
Westmoreland uranium mine	About 400 km north of Mount Isa,	Laramide Resources	1956		0.04 – 0.2			
Ben Lomond	50 km west of Townsville	Mega Uranium	1975		0.25			
Maureen	Near Georgetown in north Queensland	Mega Uranium			0.12			
East Kalkaroo								
Goulds Dam								
Brooks Dam								
Belgium
Mine	Location	Main owner	Year discovered	Probable commencement	Grade %U	Probable annual production (tOre)	Probable annual production (tU)	Probable type of mine
Mons Basin Phosphates					0.01			
Brazil
Mine	Location	Main owner	Year discovered	Probable commencement	Grade %tU	Probable annual production (tOre)	Probable annual production (tU)	Probable type of mine
Itataia project (Ceará)	Santa Quitena, CEARA	Indústrias Nucleares do Brasil			0.085			67,246 tonnes U in phosphate
N.N. (Pará)								
Amorinopolis								
Alcantil								
Serrotes Baixos								
Lago Real								
Espinharas								
Camus Belos								
Quadrilalero Ferrifero								
Gandarela								
Serra des Gaivotas								
Pitinga	Amazonas							
Santa Quiteria								
Canada
Mine	Location	Main owner	Year discovered	Probable commencement	Grade %tU	Probable annual production (tOre)	Probable annual production (tU)	Probable type of mine
Andrew Lake	Northwest Territories	AREVA NC						
Baker Lake / Kiggavik	Northwest Territories	AREVA Resources Canada Inc.			0.2			
Sissons Schultz	Northwest Territories	AREVA Resources Canada Inc.			0.25			
Mountain Lake	Northwest Territories	Triex Minerals			0.2			
Mazenod Lake	Northwest Territories	Moss Resources						
Boomerang Lake	Northwest Territories	Cameco						
PEC Uranium Deposit	Northwest Territories							
Boulder Train Property	Northwest Territories							
Coppermine River	Northwest Territories	Unor Inc						
Asiak River Property	Northwest Territories	Unor Inc						
Blizzard deposit	British Columbia	Santoy Resources Ltd.			0.21			
Foghorn deposit	British Columbia	International Ranger Corp.			0.08			
Ballistic claims	British Columbia	International Montoro Resources Inc			0.04			
RAE Property	Alberta	Red Dragon Resources Corp						
Shea Creek Property		AREVA Resources Canada Inc.						
Douglas, Erica, Alexandra, Laurie, Mirror River, Nikita and Uchrich Properties		COGEMA						
Riou Lake Property		Rio Grande Mines Corp						
Riou Lake Property/2		UEX Corp.						
Black Lake Property		JNR Resources						
Black Lake Property/2		UEX Corp.						
Serendipity Lakes Property		UEX Corp.						
Hidden Bay Property		UEX Corp.			1.17			
Cyprian Lake Property		JNR Resources						
Perch River - Newnham Lake Property		JNR Resources						
Kernaghan Lake Property		Cameco						
Virgin River Property		UEM Inc.						
Compass Lake Property		Coronation Mines Ltd.						
Hocking Lake Property		Uranium Holdings Corporation						
Henday Lake Property		Uranium Holdings Corporation						
Hump Lake Property								
Crawford, Perpete, Brown, Jasper, Morin Lake, Marean Properties		CanWest Petroleum Corp						
Crawford Lake property								
Yalowega Lake					2.5			
Russell Lake property								
Moore Lake property		International Uranium Corp.						
Lazy Edward Bay Property		International Uranium Corp						
Maurice Bay		Cameco			0.51			
Duddridge Lake Property		Strathmore Minerals Corp.			0.09			
Dieter Lake	Quebec	Strathmore Resources						
Mont Laurier property		Nova Uranium Corp						
Otish Mountain Property		Xemplar Energy Corp			0.6			
Rocky Brook Property	Newfoundland							
Michelin Deposit	Labrador	Aurora Energy Resources Inc						
Jacques Lake Deposit	Labrador	Aurora Energy Resources Inc						
Post Hill Deposit	Labrador	Aurora Energy Resources Inc.						
Roughrider Deposit	Saskatchewan	Rio Tinto	2008					UG
Fission Mine	Ontario		1922					UG
China
Mine	Location	Main owner	Year discovered	Probable commencement	Grade %U_{3}O_{8}	Probable annual production (tOre)	Probable annual production (tU)	Probable type of mine
Yili	Xinjiang Autonomous Region							
Shihongtan	Xinjiang Autonomous Region							
Zaohuohao	Inner Mongolia Autonomous Region							
Chanziping	Guangxi Autonomous Region							
Xiangshan field	Jiangxi Province							
Xiazhuang field	Guangdong Province							
Kazakhstan
Mine	Location	Main owner	Year discovered	Probable commencement	Grade %U	Probable annual production (tOre)	Probable annual production (tU)	Probable type of mine
Irkol project	Syr-Darya district							
Pakistan
Mine	Location	Main owner	Year discovered	Probable commencement	Grade %U	Probable annual production (tOre)	Probable annual production (tU)	Probable type of mine
Shanawah	Karak, NWFP	PAEC			0.04			
Wahi Pandi	Sehwan							
Karunuk	Sehwan							
Rehman Dhora (Aamri)	Kirthar Range, Sindh							

== Prospective projects and decommissioned mines ==
Argentina
Mine	Location	Main owner	Year discovered	Year commenced	Grade %U	Total production (tU)	Year closed	Type of mine
Sierra Pintada/San Rafael mine	Mendoza province	Complejo Minero Fabril San Rafael			0.19		1995	2440 t U resources
Huemul	Mendoza province	Energía Mineral S.A						
Schlagintweit	Los Gigantes, Cordoba Province							
La Estela								
Los Colorados	La Rioja Province			1993			1995	
San Rafael								
Australia
Mine	Location	Main owner	Year discovered	Year commenced	Grade %U	Total production (tU)	Year closed	Type of mine
El Sherana	Northern Territory		1954	1954				
Rum Jungle	65 km south of Darwin on the East Finniss River	AAEC/Rio Tinto	1949				1971	UG
Canada
Mine	Location	Main owner	Year discovered	Year commenced	Grade %U	Total production (tU)	Year closed	Type of mine
Patterson Lake South	Athabasca Basin, Saskatchewan	Fission Uranium Corp.	2013		.2-.25			OC
Key Lake, Gaertner and Deilmann pits	570 km north of Saskatoon, Saskatchewan	Cameco						OC
Cluff Lake	700 km from Saskatoon, Saskatchewan	COGEMA				9979	2002	UG, OC
Rayrock Mine	Northwest Territories	Rayrock Mines Limited	1948	1955			1959	UG
Eldorado Mine	Port Radium, Northwest Territories						2005	
Beaverlodge	Saskatchewan	Cameco						
Gunnar								
Lorado								
Nisto								
Pronto Mine	Spragge, Ontario	Rio Algom (BHP)				2.3 million		UG
Quirke Mine	Elliot Lake, Ontario	Rio Algom (BHP)				44 million		UG
Denison Mine	Elliot Lake, Ontario	Denison Mines				69 million		UG
Panel Mine	Elliot Lake, Ontario	Rio Algom (BHP)				15 million		UG
Can-Met Mine	Elliot Lake, Ontario	Denison Mines				2.6 million		
Stanrock Mine	Elliot Lake, Ontario	Denison Mines				6.4 million		UG
Stanleigh Mine	Elliot Lake, Ontario	Rio Algom (BHP)				14 million		
Buckles Mine	Elliot Lake, Ontario	Rio Algom (BHP)						UG
Spanish American Mine	Elliot Lake, Ontario	Rio Algom (BHP)						UG
Milliken Mine	Elliot Lake, Ontario	Rio Algom (BHP)				6.3 million		UG
Lacnor Mine	Elliot Lake, Ontario	Rio Algom (BHP)				3.4 million		UG
Nordic Mine	Elliot Lake, Ontario	Rio Algom (BHP)				13 million		UG
Agnew Lake	Agnew Lake, Ontario	ALM-Kerr Addison		1977			1983	UG
Madawaska mine (Previously: Faraday Mine)	Faraday, Ontario	Ovintiv		Phase 1: 1954 Phase 2: 1975	0.1074%	4,082 tonnes	Phase 1: 1964 Phase 2: 1982	UG
Dyno Mine	Cardiff Ontario	Ovintiv	1953	1958		363,758 kg	1960	UG
Greyhawk Mine	Faraday, Ontario	Ovintiv	1954	1958	0.069%	80,247 tonnes	1960	UG
Bicroft Mine	Cardiff Ontario	Barrick Gold		1957		2,470,000 tonnes	1963	UG
Czech Republic
Mine	Location	Main owner	Year discovered	Year commenced	Grade %U	Total production (tU)	Year closed	Type of mine
Jáchymov	North-west Bohemia in Karlovy Vary Region, in the eponymous St. Joachim's valley in the Ore Mountains on the Weseritz	Czech Government, 1949-1961 Complex of prison camps	1512-Silver, 18th century-Uranium Oxide, 1898-Radium			~10,000	1964	UG
Příbram	Central Bohemia, 60 km SW Prague	Czech Government, 1949-1991	1311-Silver, later Lead, Zinc; 1949 Uranium	1949		1950-1991: Uranium 41746, Lead 6196, Zinc 2417, Silver 11	1991	UG
Zálesí (Javorník)	Rychlebské Hory in the Olomouc Region		1957	1959		405	1968	UG
Democratic Republic of the Congo
Mine	Location	Main owner	Year discovered	Year commenced	Grade %U	Total production (tU)	Year closed	Type of mine
Shinkolobwe	In the Katanga province, located near Likasi	Union Minière du Haut Katanga (UMHK)	1911	1922	65.00	>50,000	Sealed - 1960, Official Announcement - 2004	OC/UG
Gabon
Mine	Location	Main owner	Year discovered	Year commenced	Grade %U	Total production (tU)	Year closed	Type of mine
Mounana	Near the town of Franceville, in the Haut-Ogooué province	COGEMA	1956	1960	0.37	28000	1999	OC/UG
Oklo Mine	Near the town of Franceville, in the Haut-Ogooué province	COGEMA	1968	1956	0.37	14000	1985	OC/UG
Boyindzi	Near the town of Franceville, in the Haut-Ogooué province	COGEMA		1980	0.37		1991	UG
Mikouloungou	Near the town of Franceville, in the Haut-Ogooué province (60 km away from Mounana)	COGEMA		1997	0.37		1999	OC
Germany (East Germany)
Mine	Location	Main owner	Mining Company	Year commenced	Grade %U	Total production (tU)	Year closed	Type of mine
Johanngeorgenstadt	western Erzgebirge Mts	SAG / SDAG Wismut	Objekt 01	1946		3585	1958	UG
Oberschlema	western Erzgebirge Mts	SAG / SDAG Wismut	Objekt 02	1946		7,098.9	1958	UG
Schneeberg	western Erzgebirge Mts	SAG / SDAG Wismut	Objekt 03	1947		209.7	1956	UG
Annaberg	central Erzgebirge Mts	SAG / SDAG Wismut	Objekt 04	1947		450	1958	UG
Marienberg	central Erzgebirge Mts	SAG / SDAG Wismut	Objekt 05	1947		121	1955	UG
Gottesberg	Vogtland Mts	SAG / SDAG Wismut	Objekt 06	1948		56,4	1955	UG
Schneckenstein	Vogtland Mts	SAG / SDAG Wismut	Objekt 06	1948		959,2	1960	UG
Zobes	Vogtland Mts	SAG / SDAG Wismut	Objekt 06	1949		4673,3	1964	UG
Bergen	Vogtland Mts	SAG / SDAG Wismut	Objekt 06	1949		162,2	1957	UG
Bärenhecke	eastern Erzgebirge Mts	SAG Wismut	Objekt 06	1948		1	1954	UG
Niederpöbel	eastern Erzgebirge Mts	SAG Wismut	Objekt 06	1948		30,3	1954	UG
Niederschlag	central Erzgebirge Mts	SAG Wismut	Objekt 07	1947		222	1954	UG
Weißer Hirsch - Antonsthal	western Erzgebirge Mts	SAG / SDAG Wismut	Objekt 08 / Schachtkombinat 235	1949		747,4	1959	UG
Tannenbaum - Antonsthal	western Erzgebirge Mts	SAG Wismut	Objekt 08	1948		90	1954	UG
Mai - Antonsthal	western Erzgebirge Mts	SAG / SDAG Wismut	Objekt 08 / Schachtkombinat 235	1949		50	1959	UG
Seifenbach	western Erzgebirge Mts	SAG / SDAG Wismut	Objekt 08	1947		230	1955	UG
Neu-Oberhaus	western Erzgebirge Mts	SAG / SDAG Wismut	Objekt 08	1948		62	1955	UG
Valerian - Rabenberg	western Erzgebirge Mts	SAG / SDAG Wismut	Objekt 08	1949		32	1955	UG
Unruhe - Halbmeile	western Erzgebirge Mts	SAG / SDAG Wismut	Objekt 08	1950		47	1955	UG
Tellerhäuser-Kaffenberg	western Erzgebirge Mts	SAG / SDAG Wismut	Objekt 08	1951		42	1955	UG
Grünstädtel	western Erzgebirge Mts	SAG / SDAG Wismut	Objekt 08	1949		12,3	1954	UG
Erla	western Erzgebirge Mts	SAG Wismut	Objekt 08	1949		22	1955	UG
Segen Gottes - Rittersgrün	western Erzgebirge Mts	SAG Wismut	Objekt 08	1949		20.4	1954	UG
Margarethe - Breitenbrunn	western Erzgebirge Mts	SAG Wismut	Objekt 08	1948		7	1951	UG
Niederschlema-Alberoda	western Erzgebirge Mts	SAG / SDAG Wismut	Objekt 09	1947		73,105.0	1991	UG
Pöhla	western Erzgebirge Mts	SDAG Wismut	Objekt 09	1957		1216.4	1991	UG
"Willi Agatz" Freital (hard coal mine)	Dresden	SAG Wismut / VVB Steinkohle / SDAG Wismut	Steinkohlenwerk Freital / Bergbaubetrieb "W.A."	1947 (with interruptions)		3691	1989	UG
Königstein	Elbsandsteingebirge Mts	SDAG Wismut	Bergbaubetrieb Königstein	1967		17810	1991	UG/ISL
Dittrichshütte	southern Thuringia	SAG / SDAG Wismut	Objekt 30 / Objekt 90	1950	0.032	112.62	1954	UG
Schleusingen	southern Thuringia	SAG / SDAG Wismut	Objekt 30	1950	0.01	14	1954	UG
Steinach	southern Thuringia	SAG / SDAG Wismut	Objekt 41 / Objekt 90	1951	0.094	43.55	1954	OC/UG
Sorge-Settendorf	East Thuringia	SAG / SDAG Wismut	Objekt 30 / Objekt 90	1950		2,292.4*	1957	OC
Gauern	East Thuringia	SAG / SDAG Wismut	Objekt 90	1953		427.7*	1957	OC
Culmitzsch	East Thuringia	SDAG Wismut	Objekt 90	1955		9216.6*	1967	OC
Wolfersdorf - Gera-Süd (exploration)	East Thuringia	SDAG Wismut	Objekt 90	1963		19.4*	1969	UG
Ronneburg	East Thuringia	SAG / SDAG Wismut	Objekt 90	1952		4.66*	1956	OC
Stolzenberg	East Thuringia near Ronneburg	SDAG Wismut	Objekt 90	1956		92*	1960	OC
Lichtenberg	East Thuringia near Ronneburg	SDAG Wismut	Objekt 90 / Bergbaubetrieb Lichtenberg	1958		13,837.64*	1977	OC
Reust-Lichtenberg	East Thuringia near Ronneburg	SAG / SDAG Wismut	Objekt 90 / Bergbaubetrieb Reust	1951		20,495.16* (up to 1987)	1991 (from 1987 to 1991 Schmirchau-Mine)	UG/ISL/heap leaching
Schmirchau	East Thuringia near Ronneburg	SAG / SDAG Wismut	Objekt 90 / Bergbaubetrieb Schmirchau	1951	0.101	44,769.74*	1991	UG/ISL/heap leaching
Paitzdorf	East Thuringia near Ronneburg	SDAG Wismut	Objekt 90 / Bergbaubetrieb Paitzdorf	1961	0.097	22,562.5*	1991	UG
Beerwalde	East Thuringia near Ronneburg	SDAG Wismut	Bergbaubetrieb Beerwalde	1974	0.110	7,141.1*	1991	UG
Drosen	East Thuringia near Ronneburg	SDAG Wismut	Bergbaubetrieb Drosen	1982	0.095	2,941.1	1991	UG
Germany (West Germany)
Mine	Location	Main owner	Year discovered	Year commenced	Grade %U	Total production (tU)	Year closed	Type of mine
Ellweiler	Near Ellweiler, Rhineland-Palatinate							UG
Menzenschwand	Near St. Blasien, Black Forest	Gewerkschaft Brunhilde		1961		580	1991	UG
Poland
Mine	Location	Main owner	Year discovered	Year commenced	Grade %U	Total production (tU)	Year closed	Type of mine
Kowary						1000		
Radoniów								
Kopaniec								
Kletno								
Rudki								
Radomice								
Szklarska Poreba								
Wojcieszyce								
Okrzeszyn								
Mniszków								
Miedzianka								
Radzimowice								
Rochowice								
Grzmiaca								
Redziny								
Russia
Mine	Location	Main owner	Year discovered	Year commenced	Grade %U	Total production (tU)	Year closed	Type of mine
Butugichag	Kolyma, Magadan Oblast, near town of Ust-Omchug (~50 km, or 30 mi)	State-owned, Dalstroy	1940s	1945		?	1955	OC
Slovenia
Mine	Location	Main owner	Year discovered	Year commenced	Grade %U	Total production (tU)	Year closed	Type of mine
Žirovski Vrh	Slovenia, Upper Carniola	N.E.K.	1960	1984	0.07	452 tU	1994	
Sweden
Mine	Location	Main owner	Year discovered	Year commenced	Grade %U	Total production (tU)	Year closed	Type of mine
Ranstadverket	South of Billingen, between Skövde and Falköping			1965		120 t U	1969	OC

== See also ==
- List of countries by uranium reserves
- Uranium market
- Uranium ore deposits
- Mining
- Uranium
- List of countries by uranium production
- UraMin
