= List of mines in Ontario =

This is a list of mines in the Canadian province of Ontario and includes both operating and closed mines.

- Adams Mine
- Agnew Lake Mine
- Amalgamated Larder Mine
- Argonaut Mine
- Armistice Mine
- Associated Goldfields Mine
- Barber Larder Mine
- Barton Mine
- Beanland Mine
- Bell Creek Mine
- Bidgood Mine
- Bicroft Mine (uranium)
- Big Dan Mine
- Black Fox Mine
- Buckles Mine
- Campbell Mine
- Can-Met Mine
- Cheminis Mine
- Chesterville gold mine
- Coleman Mine
- Copper Cliff North Mine
- Copper Cliff South Mine
- Copperfields Mine
- Coppersand Mine
- Cote Gold Mine
- Craig Mine
- Creighton Mine
- Denison Mine
- Detour Gold Mine
- Dome Mine
- Dyno Mine (uranium)
- Eagle River Mine
- Falconbridge Mine
- Faraday Mine (now Madawaska Mine)
- Frood Mine
- Fraser Mine
- Garson Mine
- Geco Mine
- Goderich Salt Mines – Sifto Canada
- Golden Giant Mine
- Greenstone gold mine
- Greyhawk Mine (Uranium)
- Hagersville-CGC
- Hemlo Mine
- Hermiston-McCauley Mine
- Hollinger Mines
- Holloway Mine
- Holt Mine
- Hoyle Pond Mine
- Hudson Rand Mine
- Josephine Mine
- Kanichee Mine
- Keeley-Frontier Mine
- Kerr-Addison Mine (gold)
- Kidd Mine
- Kirkland Gold Mine
- Lac Des Iles Mine
- Lacnor Mine
- Laguerre Mine
- Lake Shore Mine
- Leckie Mine
- Lockerby Mine
- Macassa Mine
- Madawaska Mine (uranium)
- Magpie Mine
- Marmoraton Mine
- Martin Bird Mine
- Martison mine
- McIntyre Mines
- McWatters Mine
- Milliken Mine
- Montcalm Mine
- Morris Kirkland Mine
- Murray Mine
- Musselwhite mine
- Nickel Rim Mine
- Nickel Rim South Mine
- Nordic Mine
- Norrie Mine
- Northland Pyrite Mine
- O'Connor Mine
- Omega Mine
- Pamour Mine
- Panel Mine
- Pawnee Mine
- Paymaster Mine
- Probe Mines
- Pronto Mine
- Queenston Mine
- Quirke Mine
- Rainy River Mine
- Red Lake Mine
- Redstone Mine
- Sherman Mine
- Sifto Salt Mine
- Silver Islet Mine
- Spanish American Mine
- Stanleigh Mine
- Stanrock Mine
- Strathcona Mine
- Sylvanite Mine
- Talon Chutes
- Tashota-Nipigon Mine
- Teck-Hughes Mine
- Temagami-Lorrain Mine
- Thayer-Lindsay Mine
- Timmins West Mine
- Titan mine
- Tough-Oakes (Toburn) Mine
- Upper Beaver Mine
- Upper Canada Mine
- Victor Diamond Mine
- Windsor Salt Mine – Canadian Salt Company
- Wilroy Mine
- Wright-Hargreaves Mine
- Young-Davidson mine

== See also ==
- List of mines in Temagami
- List of mines in the Bancroft area
- List of uranium mines in Ontario
