= Smith Ranch-Highland =

Smith Ranch - Highland Operations
- Location in Wyoming
- Location: Wyoming, United States; 43°03′13.45″N 105°41′06.32″W
- Products: Uranium
- Opened: 1972 (Highland); 1975 (Smith Ranch)
- Company: Cameco Resources
- Acquired: 1997 (Highland); 2002 (Smith Ranch)

Smith Ranch and Highland are uranium mining operations located in Wyoming, U.S.A. They are separate permits, operated as a single operation, and have one central processing facility. The Smith Ranch-Highland operation is the largest uranium production facility in the United States.

Smith Ranch and Highland are roll-front uranium deposits. Uranium is recovered using in-situ recovery (ISR) mining methods.

Between 2002 and 2011, the Smith Ranch - Highland operation has produced 15 million pounds U_{3}O_{8}.

== Reserves ==
As of December 31, 2013, proven and probable reserves are 2,599,100 metric tons at an average grade of 0.09% U_{3}O_{8}. (5.2 Million pounds)

== Ownership ==
The Smith Ranch-Highland operation is owned by Cameco Resources Inc., the U.S. subsidiary of the Canadian company, Cameco Corporation.

The Highland operation was acquired in 1997 when Cameco purchased Power Resources Inc., the majority owner of Highland. In 2002 Cameco acquired Smith Ranch from Rio Algom Mining Corporation and consolidated operations with the Highland facility.

== See also ==
- Sandstone uranium deposits
