= Greenstone gold mine =

Gold mine in Ontario, Canada

Greenstone Gold Mine
- Location in Canada
- Location: Ontario, Canada; 49°40′39″N 86°55′42″W
- Products: Gold
- Opened: 2024
- Company: Equinox Gold
- Website: Greenstone Gold Mine

The Greenstone Gold Mine is a Canadian gold mine located 5.6 kilometres (3.5 mi) southeast of the Town of Geraldton, Ontario. The mine is an open pit mine owned and operated by Equinox Gold. It began operations in 2024.

== History ==
Gold was first discovered in the Hardrock area in the 1910s. In 1931, the first twelve mining claims in the area were made. Originally called the Hardrock gold project, it was a joint venture between Premier Gold Mines and Centerra Gold. However, relations between the two companies soured in December 2019, when Centerra challenged the accuracy of a feasibility study in a legal suit. Centerra later dropped the suit and sold its stake in the project to Orion Mine Finance Group. In December 2020, Equinox Gold acquired Premier Gold Mines, with the deal being completed on April 7, 2021. With the acquisition, Equinox renamed the Hardrock project to the Greenstone project. Equinox Gold later bought out Orion Mine Finance's stake in the project in April 2024, gaining 100% ownership.

On December 13, 2018, the Canadian federal government announced its environmental assessment approval of the project. On March 11, 2019, the province of Ontario approved the project after its own environmental assessment. On October 27, 2021, construction began on the Greenstone gold mine. The Greenstone gold mine achieved its first gold pour on May 22, 2024. Equinox Gold officially opened the mine on August 29, 2024, and achieved commercial production on November 6, 2024.

== See also ==
- List of gold mines in Canada
- List of mines in Ontario
- Geology of Ontario
