= Denison Mine =

Uranium mine in Elliot Lake, Ontario, Canada

- Location in Ontario

Location
- Location: Elliot Lake, Ontario, Canada; 46°29′44.15″N 082°36′00.85″W

Production
- Products: Uranium
- Production: 69 Mt ore

History
- Opened: 1957
- Closed: 1992

Owner
- Company: Denison Mines

Consolidated Denison Mine, or the Denison Mine is an abandoned uranium mine located approximately 12.5 km north of Elliot Lake, Ontario. The site is bordered north by Quirke Mine and New Quirke Mine; on the east by Panel Mine and Can-Met Mine; and south by Spanish American Mine and Stanrock Mine.

It is owned by Denison Mines Ltd. The site has been rehabilitated and its tailings facility is currently undergoing environmental monitoring by Denison Environmental Services.

The site was the longest continuous operation in the area, from 1957 to 1992, during which time it produced 69 million tonnes of ore.

== History ==
The site was discovered in 1953, by F. H. Jowsey, A. W. Stollery who sold his stake to Consolidated Denison Mines Limited in 1954.

Geological surveys commenced in July 1954 followed by diamond drilling.

Two shafts were started in 1955 one to 1,856 feet and another to 2,766 feet that wasn't completed until 1957.

In 1957 reserves were estimated at 136,787,400 tons graded at 2.78 pounds of U_{3}0_{8} per ton.

Ore processing facilities were built, capable to processing 5,700 to 6,000 tons per day.

The site has two tailings management areas that includes 64 million tons of tailings under water.

The site was decommissioned in 1997.

== Other mines in the area ==
- Stanleigh Mine
- Spanish American Mine
- Can-Met Mine
- Milliken Mine
- Panel Mine
- Stanrock Mine
- Quirke Mine(s)
- Pronto Mine
- Buckles Mine
- Lacnor Mine
- Nordic Mine

== See also ==
- Quartz-pebble conglomerate deposits
- Uranium mining
- List of uranium mines
- List of mines in Ontario
