= Mulga Rock =

Uranium deposit in Western Australia

Mulga Rock uranium deposits'"`UNIQ--ref-00000000-QINU`"'

Mulga Rock (also called Mulga Rocks) is a proven uranium deposit in Western Australia which contains Australia's third largest undeveloped uranium resource.

The uranium deposits were discovered between 1978 and 1998 by PNC Exploration Australia, a Japanese government-owned company. The deposits are named Emperor, Shogun, Ambassador and Princess.

The project is owned by the ASX-listed company, Vimy Resources. Test pits were dug at the site in 2016 and the mine received approval on 16 December 2016. In September 2020, the company announced that all of its required environmental management plans had been accepted by the Government of Western Australia. The project's environmental and indigenous cultural impacts and economic projections have been criticised by the Australian Conservation Foundation, the Conservation Council of Western Australia and The Australia Institute respectively.
