= Buckles Mine =

Uranium mine in Ontario, Canada

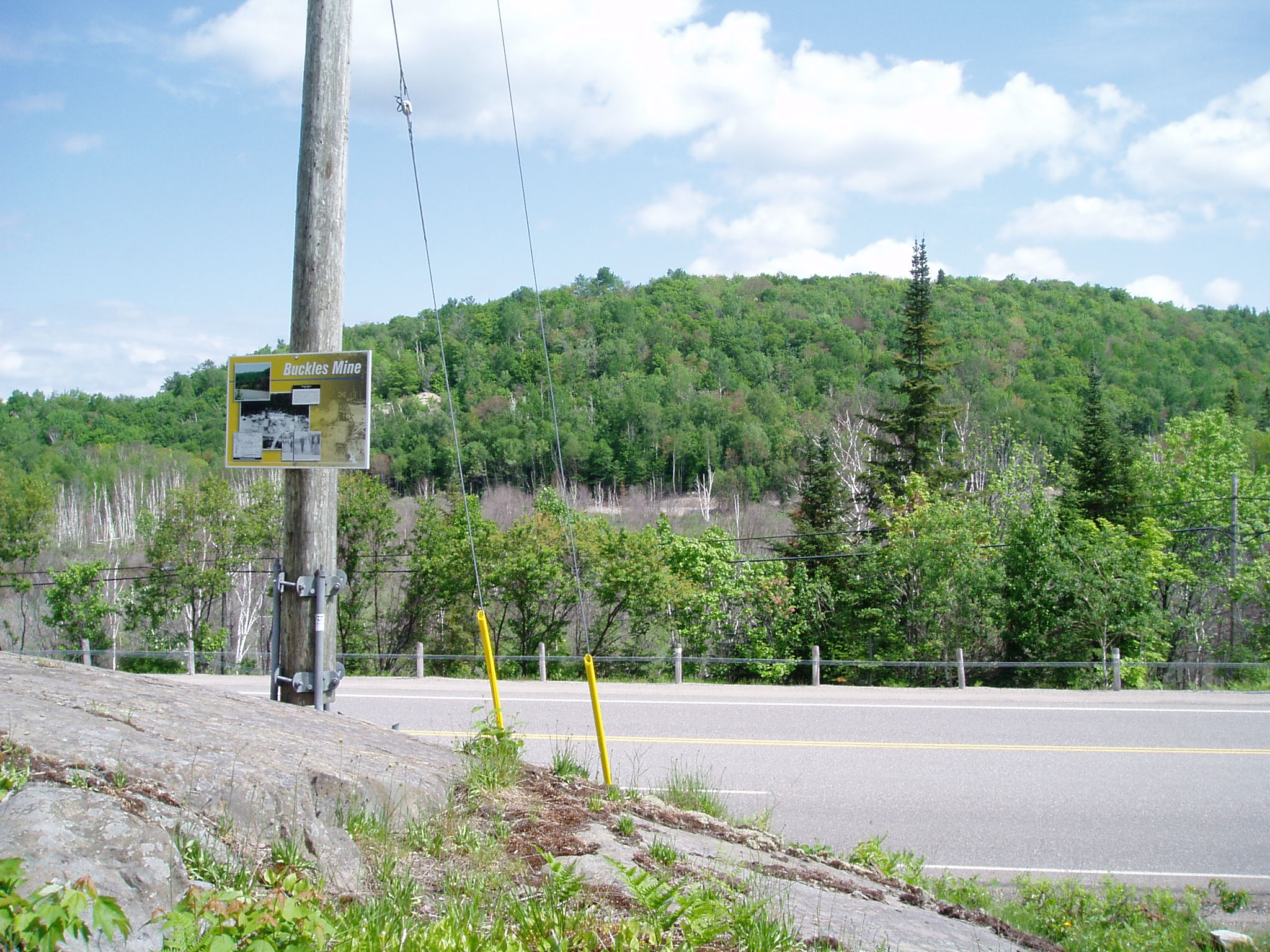
- Site of the former Buckles Mine in Elliot Lake

- Location in Ontario

Location
- Location: Elliot Lake, Ontario, Canada; 46°22′33.90″N 082°35′20.74″W

Production
- Products: Uranium
- Production: 276,000 t ore

History
- Opened: 1957
- Closed: 1958

Owner
- Company: Rio Algom

The Buckles Mine is an historical uranium mine located approximately 4.5 km southeast of Elliot Lake, Ontario, owned and operated by Rio Algom Ltd. The site has been rehabilitated. Environmental monitoring is ongoing as part of the monitoring for the nearby Nordic Mine.

== History ==
The mine was owned by Buckles Algoma Uranium Mines Limited, and was bought in 1955 by Spanish American Mines Limited in 1955.

1955 reserves were indicated to be 486,500 tons at 0.124% U_{3}0_{8} in a 10 feet thick zone located 75 feet underground.

About 500 tons of ore was shipped to the Spanish American mine for processing daily.

The mine was in operation from 1957 to 1958, during which time it produced 276,000 tonnes of ore.

== Other mines in the area ==
- Stanleigh Mine
- Spanish American Mine
- Can-Met Mine
- Milliken Mine
- Panel Mine
- Denison Mine
- Stanrock Mine
- Quirke Mine(s)
- Pronto Mine
- Lacnor Mine
- Nordic Mine

== See also ==
- Quartz-pebble conglomerate deposits
- Uranium mining
- List of uranium mines
- List of mines in Ontario
