= Alcantil =

Coordinates: 7.74389°S 36.0558°W

- Municipality
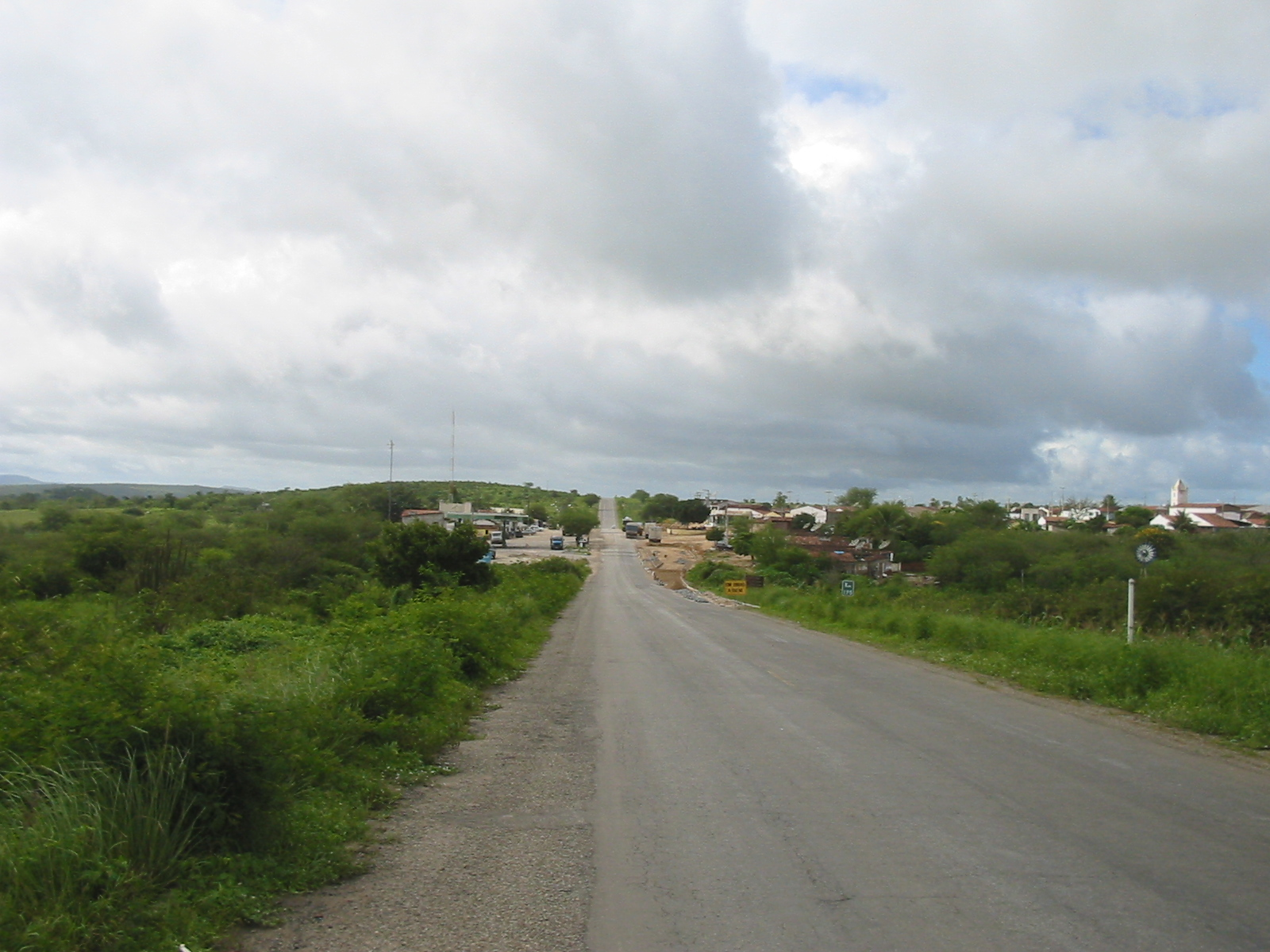

- Flag Coat of arms
- Interactive map of Alcantil
- Country: Brazil
- Region: Northeast
- State: Paraíba
- Mesoregion: Boborema

Population (2020)
  - Total: 5,509
- Time zone: UTC−3 (BRT)

Alcantil (Central northeastern portuguese pronunciation: [ɐwkɐ̃ˈtiw]) is a municipality in the state of Paraíba in the Northeast Region of Brazil.

== See also ==
- List of municipalities in Paraíba
