= Stanrock Mine =

Uranium mine in Elliot Lake, Ontario, Canada

- Location in Ontario
- Location: Elliot Lake, Ontario, Canada; 46°28′20.4″N 082°33′35.37″W
- Products: Uranium
- Production: 6.4 Mt ore
- Opened: 1958
- Closed: 1985
- Company: Denison Mines

The Stanrock Mine is an historical uranium mine located approximately 11.5 km northeast of Elliot Lake, Ontario, owned by Denison Mines. The site has been decommissioned and rehabilitated with ongoing monitoring by Denison Environmental Services.

The site was in operation from 1958 to 1964 as a traditional mining operation. Following the end of large scale drilling and blasting operations, the mine continued production using a leaching technique which utilised water and bacteria. Production contracts were fulfilled by 1970 and all operations ceased. The property was sold to Denison Mines in the early 1970s Total production was 6.4 million tonnes of ore.

== Other mines in the area ==
- Stanleigh Mine
- Spanish American Mine
- Can-Met Mine
- Milliken Mine
- Panel Mine
- Denison Mine
- Quirke Mine(s)
- Pronto Mine
- Buckles Mine
- Lacnor Mine
- Nordic Mine

== See also ==
- Quartz-pebble conglomerate deposits
- Uranium mining
- List of uranium mines
- List of mines in Ontario
