= Nordic Mine =

Uranium mine in Elliot Lake, Ontario, Canada

- Location in Ontario
- Location: Elliot Lake, Ontario, Canada; 46°22′47.66″N 082°35′11.19″W
- Products: Uranium
- Production: 13 Mt ore
- Opened: 1956
- Closed: 1968 (mine); 1990(mill)
- Company: Rio Algom

The Nordic Mine, is an abandoned uranium mine in the Elliot Lake area of Ontario, owned by Rio Algom Ltd. The site has been rehabilitated and its tailings facility is currently undergoing environmental monitoring by Denison Environmental Services.

The site was in operation from 1957 to 1968, during which time it produced 12 million tonnes of tailings. The mill continued to process ore from the Quirke and Panel mines until 1990.

Although underground production ceased in 1968, the Dry-and-Pack section of the mill was active for 2 more decades along with several offices and a Security Gatehouse. The property also became a temporary graveyard for derelict and neglected vehicles from various Rio Algoma apartment parking lots, mine parking lots and trailer park left-overs as people were coming and going during the crazy boom days of the late 1970s and early 1980s.

== Other mines in the area ==
- Stanleigh Mine
- Spanish American Mine
- Can-Met Mine
- Milliken Mine
- Panel Mine
- Denison Mine
- Stanrock Mine
- Quirke Mine(s)
- Pronto Mine
- Buckles Mine
- Lacnor Mine

== See also ==
- Quartz-pebble conglomerate deposits
- Uranium mining in the Elliot Lake area
- List of uranium mines
- List of mines in Ontario
