= Turamdih Uranium Mine =

Uranium mine in India

Turamdih Uranium Mine is a uranium deposit in Jaduguda, Jharkhand. Turamdih mine is a Uranium mine in Jharkhand. It is located 24 km the west of Jaduguda district. This is the fourth uranium mine of The Uranium Corporation of India Ltd. (UCIL). AMD discovered this mine in 1969 and was commissioned in 2003. It lies within the Singhbhum thrust belt and lies up to 170 meters deep from the surface.

In 1989, the Uranium Corporation of India undertook the project, however, it was postponed to 1992 and the chairman of the Atomic Energy Commission Dr. Anil Kakodkar inaugurated it on November 9, 2002. The total capacity of the mine is 7.6 million tonnes the surface data is explored by an integrated mine planning software.

The 8 degrees decline entry into the mine facilitates to use of trackless instruments like drill jumbo, passenger carrier, etc. Long home drill equipment is used for regular underground exploration. The production capacity of the ore can be increased from 550 tonnes to 750 tonnes per day by pulling it on the surface through decline

In 2003-04’s first quarter the fore production has been commenced. For the first 3 years, the ore is shifted to Jaduguda and then it would be again brought back to Turamdih’s newly constructed plant.
