= Titan mine =

Titanium mine in Ontario, Canada

- Location: Ontario, Canada
- Products: Titanium

The Titan mine is one of the largest titanium mines in Canada. It is located in Ontario, and has reserves amounting to 49 million tonnes of ore grading 14.8% titanium and 0.24% vanadium.

== See also ==
- List of mines in Canada
