= Martison mine =

Mine in Ontario, Canada

- Location: Ontario, Canada
- Products: Phosphates

The Martison mine is a large mine located in Ontario. Martison represents one of the largest phosphates reserve in Canada having estimated reserves of 117.9 million tonnes of ore grading 22% P_{2}O_{5}. The mine opened in 2010.
