= Quirke Mine =

Uranium mine in Elliot Lake, Ontario, Canada

- Location in Ontario
- Location: Elliot Lake, Ontario, Canada; 46°30′40″N 82°37′56″W
- Products: Uranium
- Production: 44 Mt ore
- Opened: 1956
- Closed: 1990
- Company: Rio Algom

The Quirke Mine is an abandoned uranium mine located approximately 13.5 km north of Elliot Lake, Ontario, owned and operated by Rio Algom Ltd. The site has been rehabilitated and is currently undergoing environmental monitoring.

The mine was in operation from 1956 to 1960, and again from 1968 to 1990, during which time it produced 44 million tons of ore from two separate shafts.

== Other mines in the area ==
- Stanleigh Mine
- Spanish American Mine
- Can-Met Mine
- Milliken Mine
- Panel Mine
- Denison Mine
- Stanrock Mine
- Pronto Mine
- Buckles Mine
- Lacnor Mine
- Nordic Mine

== See also ==
- Quartz-pebble conglomerate deposits
- Uranium mining
- List of uranium mines
- List of mines in Ontario
