= Lacnor Mine =

Uranium mine in Elliot Lake, Ontario, Canada

- Location in Ontario
- Location: Elliot Lake, Ontario, Canada; 46°23′42.27″N 82°36′28.5″W
- Products: Uranium
- Production: 3.4 Mt ore
- Opened: 1957
- Closed: 1960
- Company: Rio Algom

The Lacnor Mine, is an abandoned uranium mine in the Elliot Lake area of Ontario, owned by Rio Algom Ltd. The site has been rehabilitated and its tailings facility is currently undergoing environmental monitoring by Denison Environmental Services.

The site was in operation from 1957 to 1960, during which time it produced 3.4 million tonnes of ore.

== History ==
=== Elliot Lake Mining District ===
The region of Elliot Lake, Ontario was a mecca of Canadian mineral mining from the 1950s to the early 1990s. The region housed ten mines and five mills (Lacnor Mine, Nordic Mine, Panel Mine/Mill, Pronto Mine/Mill, Quirke Mine/Mill, Stanleigh Mine/Mill and the Spanish American Mine/Mill), all operated by the Rio Algom Company. All of the mines and mills in Elliot Lake either ran out their contracts or were shut down by the early 1990s due to the discovery of high-grade uranium deposits in Australia and Saskatchewan. This meant there was no longer a need for the low-grade ore from Elliot Lake, which required a large amount of processing.

== Geology ==
The Lacnor deposit is on the south limb of the Quirke Lake syncline. The ore bed consists of uraniferous quartz-pebble conglomerate. Two principle beds of conglomerate ore were found. The average thickness of the upper bed is 11 feet and the lower bed 12 feet. They are separated by a 14-foot bed of pebbly quartzite that is radioactive but not of ore grade. The strata strike about N70E and dips 18 N. The east/west ore width indicated by drilling is approximately 3300 feet. The conglomerate consists of quartz pebbles in a matrix of feldspathic quartzite well mineralized with 5 to 15% pyrite and frequently containing a little chalcopyrite.

== Other mines in the area ==
- Stanleigh Mine
- Spanish American Mine
- Can-Met Mine
- Milliken Mine
- Panel Mine
- Denison Mine
- Stanrock Mine
- Quirke Mine(s)
- Pronto Mine
- Buckles Mine
- Nordic Mine

== See also ==
- Quartz-pebble conglomerate deposits
- Uranium mining
- List of uranium mines
- List of mines in Ontario
