= Spanish American Mine =

Uranium mine in Ontario, Canada

- Location in Ontario
- Location: Elliot Lake, Ontario, Canada; 46°28′33.84″N 082°35′5.49″W
- Products: Uranium
- Production: 79,000 t ore
- Opened: 1958
- Closed: 1959
- Company: Rio Algom

The Spanish American Mine is a historical uranium mine located approximately 11 km (7 mi) northeast of Elliot Lake, Ontario, owned and operated by Rio Algom Ltd. The site is 2.3 km (1 mi) southeast of the Denison Mine.

The mine was in operation from 1958 to 1959, when it was closed due to water inflow from a fractured zone. During this time it produced 79,000 tons of ore.

== Other mines in the area ==
- Stanleigh Mine
- Can-Met Mine
- Milliken Mine
- Panel Mine
- Denison Mine
- Stanrock Mine
- Quirke Mine(s)
- Pronto Mine
- Buckles Mine
- Lacnor Mine
- Nordic Mine

== See also ==
- Quartz-pebble conglomerate deposits
- Uranium mining
- List of uranium mines
- List of mines in Ontario
