= Pronto Mine =

Uranium mine in Elliot Lake, Ontario, Canada

- Location in Ontario
- Location: Elliot Lake, Ontario, Canada; 46°13′N 82°43′W
- Products: Uranium
- Discovered: 1953
- Opened: 1956
- Closed: 1960 (mine); 1970 (mill)
- Company: Rio Algom

The Pronto Mine is an historical uranium mine located approximately 20 km south of Elliot Lake, Ontario near Spragge. The site is owned and operated by Rio Algom Ltd, has been rehabilitated and is currently undergoing environmental monitoring.

The mine was in operation from 1956 to 1960, during which time it produced 4,643,835 pounds of U_{3}O_{8}. Upon closure of the mine, the mill was converted to a copper concentrator to process ore from the nearby Pater Mine and operated until 1970.

== History ==
The Pronto mine is located on lot 3, concession II, Long township. It is located 11 miles east of Blind River, it is near the Canadian Pacific Railway and highway 17.

The Pronto deposit was discovered in 1953, by geologist Franc R. Joubin, becoming the first uranium deposit discovered in the Algoma region. The prospecting was grubstaked by a J. H. Hirshhorn, a hotel owner. They formed Peach Uranium Syndicate, which later became Peach Uranium and Metals Limited and started diamond drilling.

Messrs. Joubin and Hirshhorn, aided by staff from Preston East Dome gold mine, staked 1,400 claims and discovered more locations with uranium ore.

The summer 1953 publication of the success of Messrs. Joubin and Hirshhorn caused "the greatest staking rush in the history of Ontario"

In 1954, after establishing the size of the find, a contract for the sale of the uranium to the value of $55 million was signed and Pronto Uranium Mines Limited was formed as a subsidiary company to operate the mine. A shaft 650 feet deep shaft with four levels at 100 feet apart was sunk.

Production started in September 1955. There was an ore treatment plant that could process 1,250 tons per day.

Rio Tino bought Hirshhorn's share of the mine in 1956.

1958 the shaft was dug deeper to a seventh level and the treatment plant was upgraded to be able to process 1,500 tons per day.

In 1958, Pronto Uranium Mines Limited declared dividends of $0.75 per a share.

1960 four companies, including Pronto Uranium Mines Limited, merged to form Rio Algom Mines Limited. Pronto Mine closed in April 1960, although the mill continued operating.

== Other mines in the area ==
- Stanleigh Mine
- Spanish American Mine
- Can-Met Mine
- Milliken Mine
- Panel Mine
- Denison Mine
- Stanrock Mine
- Quirke Mine(s)
- Buckles Mine
- Lacnor Mine
- Nordic Mine

== See also ==
- Quartz-pebble conglomerate deposits
- Uranium mining
- List of uranium mines
- List of mines in Ontario
