= Milliken Mine =

Uranium mine in Ontario, Canada

- Location in Ontario
- Location: Elliot Lake, Ontario, Canada; 46°24′12.89″N 082°37′40.10″W
- Products: Uranium
- Production: 6.3 Mt ore
- Opened: 1958
- Closed: 1964
- Company: Rio Algom

The Milliken Mine is an abandoned uranium mine located approximately 2.5 km northeast of Elliot Lake, Ontario, owned and operated by Rio Algom Ltd. The site has been rehabilitated and its tailings facility is currently undergoing environmental monitoring by Denison Environmental Services as part of the monitoring of the Stanleigh Mine and tailings facility.

The site was in operation from 1958 to 1964, during which time it produced 6.3 million tonnes of ore

A company townsite existed on the west side of the Milliken Mine road, 1/2 km from the mine. It provided accommodations for staff employees. In the early 1970s, the townsite became abandoned as all the houses were relocated to empty lots in Elliot Lake or transported to other communities along the North Shore of highway 17.

Although the mine closed in the mid-1960s many of the buildings including the mill, two head-frames and some offices remained in place well into the 1990s. Several of the offices were used by the Equestrian Club in the 1970s and 1980s.

The abandoned mill, during the 1970s and 1980s, became a periodic adventure destination for youngsters from the town of Elliot Lake. They would travel out by bicycle on the Milliken Mine road and enter the Mine property through a cut hole in the fence, near the corner of where the Milliken and Stanleigh Mine roads intersected.

== Other mines in the area ==
- Stanleigh Mine
- Spanish American Mine
- Can-Met Mine
- Panel Mine
- Denison Mine
- Stanrock Mine
- Quirke Mine(s)
- Pronto Mine
- Buckles Mine
- Lacnor Mine
- Nordic Mine

== See also ==
- Quartz-pebble conglomerate deposits
- Uranium mining
- List of uranium mines
- List of mines in Ontario
