= Panel Mine =

Uranium mine in Elliot Lake, Ontario, Canada

- Location in Ontario Panel Mine (Canada)
- Location: Elliot Lake, Ontario, Canada; 46°23′N 82°38′W
- Products: Uranium
- Production: 15 Mt ore
- Opened: 1958
- Closed: 1990
- Company: Rio Algom

The Panel Mine is an abandoned uranium mine located approximately 14.5 km northeast of Elliot Lake, Ontario, owned and operated by Rio Algom Ltd. The site has been rehabilitated and is currently undergoing environmental monitoring.

The mine was in operation from 1958 to 1961, and again from 1979 to 1990, during which time it produced 15 million tons of ore.

== Other mines in the area ==
- Stanleigh Mine
- Spanish American Mine
- Can-Met Mine
- Milliken Mine
- Denison Mine
- Stanrock Mine
- Quirke Mine(s)
- Pronto Mine
- Buckles Mine
- Lacnor Mine
- Nordic Mine

== See also ==
- Quartz-pebble conglomerate deposits
- Uranium mining
- List of uranium mines
- List of mines in Ontario
