= Stanleigh Mine =

Uranium mine in Elliot Lake, Canada

- Interactive map of Stanleigh Mine
- Location: Elliot Lake, , Canada; 46°24′48.67″N 082°38′14.46″W
- Products: Uranium
- Opened: 1958
- Closed: 1996
- Company: Rio Algom

The Stanleigh Mine is an abandoned uranium mine located approximately 3 km northeast of Elliot Lake, Ontario, owned and operated by Rio Algom Ltd. The site has been rehabilitated and is currently undergoing environmental monitoring.

The mine was in operation from 1958 to 1961, and again from 1983 to 1996. During this time, it produced 14 million tonnes of ore.

== Other mines in the area ==
- Spanish American Mine
- Can-Met Mine
- Milliken Mine
- Panel Mine
- Denison Mine
- Stanrock Mine
- Quirke Mine(s)
- Pronto Mine
- Buckles Mine
- Lacnor Mine
- Nordic Mine

== See also ==
- Quartz-pebble conglomerate deposits
- Uranium mining
- List of uranium mines
- List of mines in Ontario
