= Agnew Lake Mine =

Uranium mine in Ontario, Canada

- Location in Ontario
- Location: Agnew Lake, Ontario, Canada; 46°25′53″N 081°37′38″W
- Products: Uranium (U_{3}O_{8})
- Production: 181,417 kilograms (399,956 lb)
- Financial year: 1978
- Opened: 1977
- Closed: 1983
- Company: Kerr Addison Mines Ltd.

The Agnew Lake Mine was a uranium mine located in the township of Hyman approximately 10 kilometres (6.2 mi) northeast of Agnew Lake, Ontario and 75 kilometres (47 mi) east of Elliot Lake, Ontario.

== History ==
90 holes were diamond drilled by New Thurbois Mines Limited in 1954 to 1955. In 1956, Canadian Thorium Corporation Limited purchased the site and completed ground geophysics and mapping. Kerr Addison Mines Limited and Quebec Mattagami Minerals continued to develop the site in 1965 to 1967. Agnew Lake Mines Limited bought the property in 1967 and continued the property development, and started mining. The mine began producing uranium in 1977, utilizing both underground and surface mining techniques. Agnew Lake was the first biohydrometallurgy mining operation. Underground mining was done via sublevel stoping, with oversize rock skipped to surface via a shaft, bioleaching was carried out both underground and on surface stockpiles to produce Triuranium octoxide (U_{3}O_{8}). By the end of 1980 underground mining stopped, and by 1983 the mine closed.

The Agnew Lake mine site was decommissioned, buildings removed, and the shaft capped. Monitoring of the site was carried out by Kerr Addison between 1983 and 1988, with the property being turned over to the Ontario government in the early 1990s.

In 2005 and 2006 472m of diamond drilling was completed by Ursa Major Minerals Incorporated. Nyah Resources Incorporated did seven more diamond drill holes in 2007. In 2017, Skead Holdings Incorporated did a ground geophysical survey.

== Geology ==
The uranium mineralization at Agnew Lake is contained within a pyritic quartz-pebble conglomerate that unconformably overlies granitic rocks. This is similar to the style of mineralization found in the Elliot Lake uranium camp.

== See also ==
- Quartz-pebble conglomerate deposits
- Uranium mining
- List of uranium mines
- List of mines in Ontario
