= Rayrock Mine =

Uranium mine in Northwest Territories, Canada

- Location in Canada Rayrock Mine (Canada)
- Location: Maryleer Lake, Northwest Territories, Canada; 63°26′38″N 116°33′03″W
- Products: Uranium
- Discovered: 1948
- Opened: 1957
- Closed: 1959
- Company: Rayrock Mines Ltd

The Rayrock Mine was a uranium producing venture in the Northwest Territories, Canada. It is located on the south side of Maryleer Lake and the north shore of Fault Lake, 169 kilometers northwest of Yellowknife and 74 kilometres northwest of Rae. Radioactive deposits were originally staked in 1948 and then restaked in 1950. American Yellowknife Mines Limited explored the site with detailed Geiger surveys and extensive trenching in the early 1950s. In 1954 exploration work included over 10,000 feet (3,000 m) of surface diamond drilling, and the company was reorganized as Rayrock Mines Limited.

Underground development began in 1955 with the driving of a long adit tunnel to intersect the radioactive zones 300 feet (91 m) below surface. The mine opened in June 1957 with a 150 tons per day leaching mill. Development was expanded and the mine reached depths of 1,000 feet (300 m) by the end of 1957. The failure to locate ore in significant quantity below the 1,000-foot (300 m) level resulted in the cessation of mining on July 31, 1959.

During the operations at Rayrock Mine, an on-site mill facility processed 78,781 short tons of uranium ore yielding 458,020 pounds of uranium concentrate. Rayrock Mine was a fully underground uranium mine with a small townsite built by the company being in operation during this period. The mine employed 135 men in 1958 and the townsite had 20 families as residents. The mining facility and town existed in an abandoned state for over twenty years after the mine closed.

In 1987, the buildings of the mine and town were demolished. Environmental cleanup began in 1996, with the objective being to contain contaminants at the site and limit exposure to persons who visit the area. Remediation activities included sealing mine openings, removing radioactive material from the dump, disposing of this contaminated material on the tailings, and capping the tailings piles with a layer of silty clay, followed by revegetation.

== Contamination ==
The site became contaminated with radioactive tailings that were deposited on land. Some of these dangerous tailing flowed into three small lakes. When the mine closed tailings basins contained 70,903 tonnes of radioactive tailings that had the potential to leach metals. The mine shafts itself also create a source of potential radioactive contamination through radon gas emissions from the mine openings.

The territorial government has agreed to long-term monitoring of the site in order to ensure radiation levels and contamination does not threaten the area. This is to be conducted annually until 2009. After this time followed by once every 10 years for a further 100 years. This may change if results warrant adjustment, such as some minor care and maintenance work completed in summer 2004. Monitoring assesses the integrity of sealed mine openings, water quality and potential risks to humans.
