= Rio Algom =

Canadian mining company

- Traded as: TSX: ROM
- Industry: Uranium mining
- Founded: 30 June 1960
- Headquarters: 120 Adelaide Street West, Toronto, Ontario
- Parent: BHP

Rio Algom Limited is a Canadian mining company that has existed since 1960. The company was founded by Rio Tinto through the merger of its four Canadian uranium mining operations: Algom Uranium Mines Limited, Milliken Lake Uranium Mines Limited, Northspan Uranium Mines Limited, and Pronto Uranium Mines Limited. In October 2000, Rio Algom was acquired outright by Billiton plc of London, which a year later merged with the Broken Hill Proprietary Company (BHP) of Sydney. Rio Algom has remained a wholly owned subsidiary of BHP since 2001.

== Uranium ==
It operated many uranium mines and mills in the Elliot Lake region of Ontario, Canada, including the Lacnor Mine, Nordic Mine, Panel Mine, Pronto Mine, Quirke Mine, Milliken Mine, Stanleigh Mine, and the Spanish-American Mine. These operated from the 1950s to the 1990s.

It got ownership of a uranium mill in the Ambrosia Lake region of New Mexico when it purchased the Quivira Mining Corporation from Kerr-McGee in 1989. The mill had only been active from 1958-1985. However from 1989-2002 it produced uranium from recovered mine-water.

The 2017 performance of Rio Algom, who own nine decommissioned uranium mines at Elliot Lake, was described as "below expectations" by the Canadian Nuclear Safety Commission. The commission reported radium releases above limits at the Stanleigh effluent treatment plant, prompting engineering work plus increased site monitoring by Rio Algom.

== Mergers and acquisitions ==
Rio Algom bought the Quivira Mining Corporation (a subsidiary of Kerr-McGee) in 1989.

Rio Algom was bought by Billiton in 2000.

== Leadership ==
=== President ===
1. Robert Henry Winters, 30 June 1960 – 13 September 1963
2. Henry George De Young, 13 September 1963 – 18 May 1965
3. Robert Henry Winters, 18 May 1965 – 15 December 1965
4. Sir John Norman Valette Duncan, 15 December 1965 – May 1966
5. Robert Douglas Armstrong, May 1966 – 25 April 1975
6. George Robert Albino, 25 April 1975 – 28 April 1982
7. Ray Wayne Ballmer, 28 April 1982 – 1 August 1988
8. Colin Alexander Macaulay, 1 August 1988 – 24 April 1996
9. Lawrence Chester Reinertson, 24 April 1996 – 14 July 1996 †
10. Patrick Michael James, 2 June 1997 – 31 December 2000

=== Chairman of the Board ===
1. Robert Henry Winters, 13 September 1963 – 15 December 1965
2. Sir John Norman Valette Duncan, 15 December 1965 – 25 April 1975
3. Robert Douglas Armstrong, 25 April 1975 – 29 April 1981
4. George Robert Albino, 29 April 1981 – 3 November 1987
5. Ross James Turner, 3 November 1987 – 2 December 1991
6. Gordon Cecil Gray, 2 December 1991 – 31 December 2000

== See also ==
- Denison Mines
