= Denison Mines =

Canadian mining company

Denison Mines Corp.
- Type: Public
- Traded as: TSX: DML
- Industry: Mining, Industrial Metals & Minerals
- Founded: 24 March 1960
- Founder: Stephen B. Roman
- Headquarters: Toronto, Ontario, Canada
- Number of locations: Toronto, Saskatoon, Vancouver
- Key people: David D. Cates
- Number of employees: 70 (2018)
- Website: www.denisonmines.com

Denison Mines Corp. is a Canadian uranium exploration, development, and production company. Founded by Stephen B. Roman, and best known for its uranium mining in Blind River and Elliot Lake, it later diversified into coal, potash, and other projects.

== History ==
About 1,000 workers at Denison's Elliot Lake mines went on strike in 1974, protesting unhealthy working conditions. The protest led to immediate improvements in safety conditions, and prompted Bill Davis to commission James Milton Ham to lead the Royal Commission on the Health and Safety of Workers in Mines.

Denison served as manager for Uranium Participation Corporation, a Toronto-based investment fund which holds no license to deal in uranium until 2021 before it was sold to Sprott Asset Management and WMC Energy.

== Ownership and leadership ==
15% of the company is owned by Korea Electric Power Corporation (KEPCO).

The CEO is David D. Cates, and Ron F. Hochstein is the chair of the board.

== Operations ==
Denison's principal assets are its northern Saskatchewan interests in the McClean Lake mine, the Midwest Uranium Project and the Wheeler River project. Denison also manages decommissioned uranium mines in the Elliot Lake area.

In 2013, Denison purchased a number of uranium exploration projects from Fission Energy, including the Waterbury Lake uranium development and other properties in the Athabasca Basin.

In January 2017 Denison announced it had executed an agreement to increase ownership of the Wheeler River Uranium Project in the Athabasca Basin to 66%.

== See also ==
- Uranium mining in the Elliot Lake area
- Uranium
- Nuclear power
