= Can-Met Mine =

Uranium mine in Elliot Lake, Ontario, Canada

- Location in Ontario

Location
- Location: Elliot Lake, Ontario, Canada; 46°28′39.47″N 082°32′45.05″W

Production
- Products: Uranium
- Production: 2.6 Mt ore

History
- Opened: 1957
- Closed: 1960

Owner
- Company: Denison Mines

The Can-Met Mine is an abandoned uranium mine located approximately 12.5 km northeast of Elliot Lake, Ontario, owned by Denison Mines Ltd. The site has been rehabilitated and its tailings facility (shared with the Stanrock Mine) is currently undergoing environmental monitoring by Denison Environmental Services.

The site was in operation from 1957 to 1960, during which time it produced 2.6 million tonnes of ore.

== History ==
The property was staked by Carl Mattaini and owned by Can-Met Explorations Limited.

In 1957, eleven holes were diamond drilled. Each drilling found ore-bearing conglomerate averaging 16 feet thick.

1958 ore reserves were reported to be 6,642,380 tons with a grade of 1.832 pounds of U_{3}0_{8} per ton.

The mine had shafts, 500 feet apart, at 2,127 feet and 2,395 feet deep. An ore plant capable of processing 3,000 tons of ore a day was finished in October 1957. Production started December 1957.

In 1960, Can-Met Explorations Limited merged with Consolidated Denison Mines Limited into Denison Mines Limited and the mine stopped operating.

The production value of the mine by year was:

- 1957 $240,000
- 1958 $12.76m
- 1959 $17.85m
- 1960 $6.74m

Total $37.59m

== See also ==
- Quartz-pebble conglomerate deposits
- Uranium mining
- List of uranium mines
- List of mines in Ontario
