= Uranium mining in the Bancroft area =

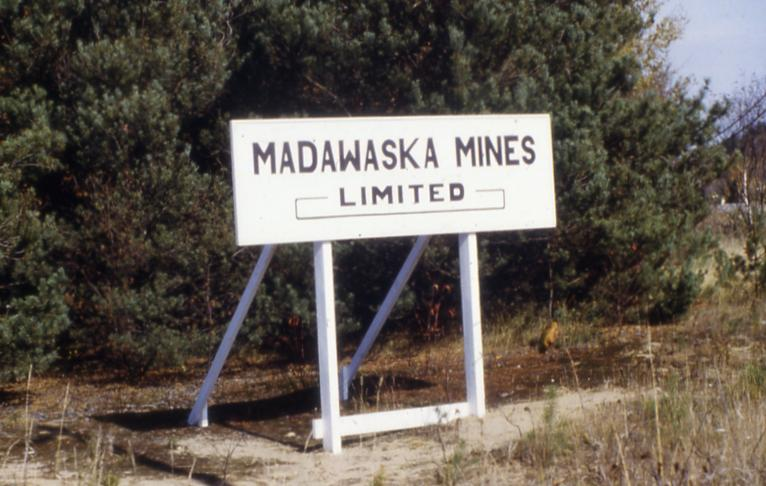
Madawaska Mine entrance sign, 1985

Uranium mining around Bancroft, Ontario, was conducted at four sites, beginning in the early 1950s and concluding by 1982. Bancroft was one of two major uranium-producing areas in Ontario, and one of seven in Canada, all located along the edge of the Canadian Shield. In the context of mining, the "Bancroft area" includes Haliburton, Hastings, and Renfrew counties, and all areas between Minden and Lake Clear. Activity in the mid-1950s was described by engineer A. S. Bayne in a 1977 report as the "greatest uranium prospecting rush in the world".

As a result of activities at its four major uranium mines, Bancroft experienced rapid population and economic growth throughout the 1950s. By 1958, Canada had become one of the world's leading producers of uranium; the $274 million of uranium exports that year represented Canada's most significant mineral export. By 1963, the federal government had purchased more than $1.5 billion of uranium from Canadian producers, but soon thereafter the global supply uranium market collapsed and the government stopped issuing contracts to buy. Mining resumed when uranium prices rose during the 1970s energy crisis, but this second period of activity ended by 1982.

Three of the uranium mines are decommissioned, and one is undergoing rehabilitation. A twofold increase in lung cancer development and mortality has been observed among former mine workers. Bancroft continues to be known for gems and mineralogy.

== Geology and mineralogy ==
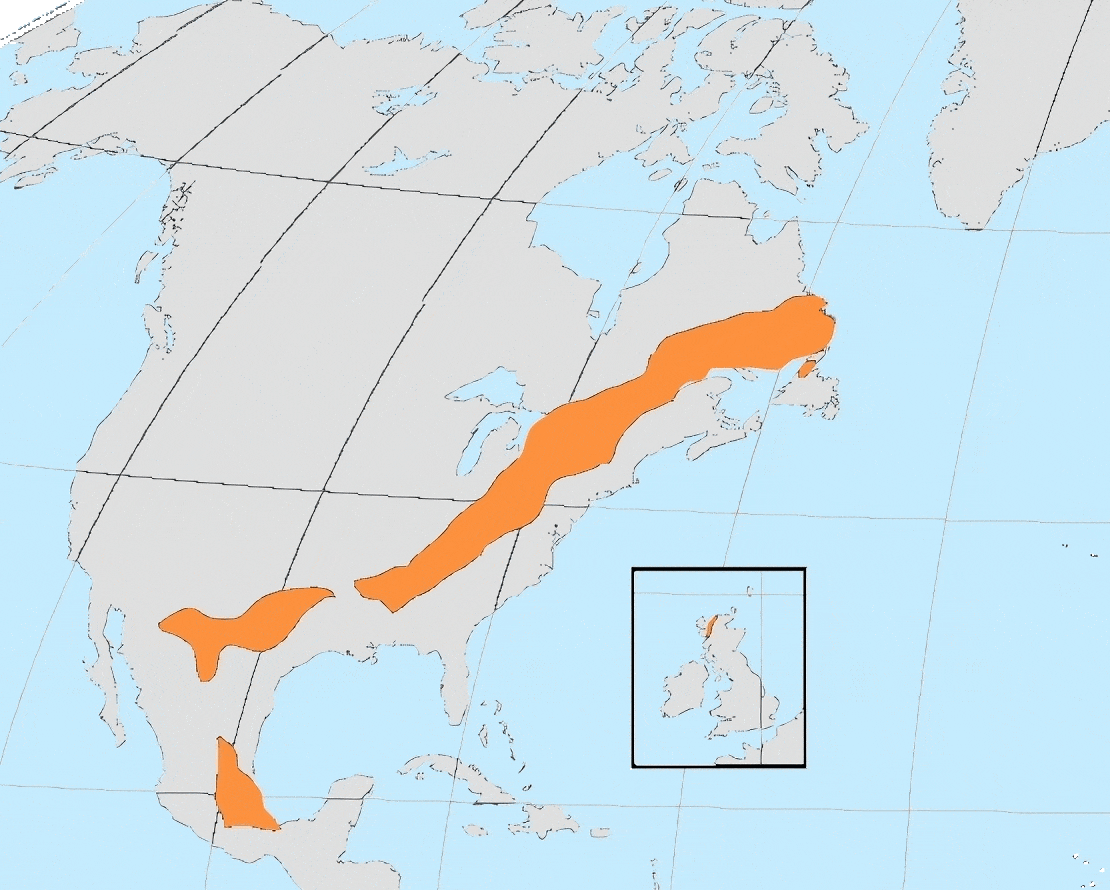
Extent of the Grenville Province (in orange) in North America and Scotland

During the most recent ice age, in the area of what is now Bancroft, Ontario, ancient glaciers removed soil and rock, exposing the Precambrian granite that had been the heart of volcanic mountains on an ancient sea bed. During the Grenville orogenies, sedimentary rocks were transformed by heat and pressure into banded gneiss and marble, incorporating gabbro and diorite (rich in iron and other dark minerals). Some uranium ores in these structures are about 1,000 million years old, while others are understood to be 1,200 million years old. In Canada, 99% of known uranium occurrences and 93% of properties producing uranium are located on the geological shield known as the Canadian Shield, almost all on the western and southern edges of it.

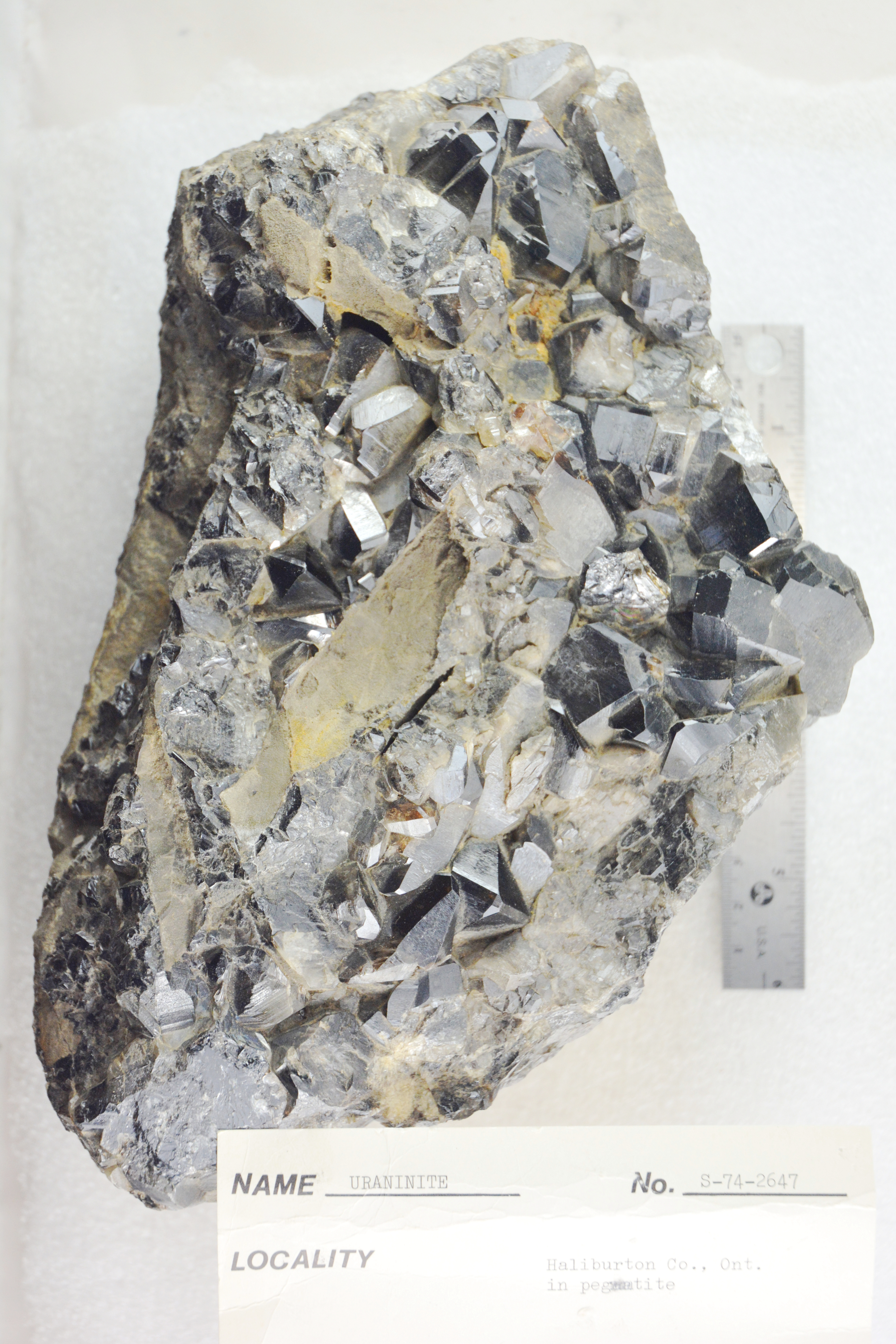
Uraninite in pegmatite, from Haliburton County

The Grenville Province in Eastern Canada has small quantities of uranium-thorium-rare earth element in granitic pegmatite which appear in numerous locations around the Bancroft area, giving Bancroft the moniker of the "Mineral Capital of Canada". The "Bancroft area" includes Haliburton, Hastings, and Renfrew counties, and all areas between Minden and Lake Clear.

Bancroft is unusual as one of the limited global locations where uranium is extracted from intrusive rocks, notably the only one from the pegmatite type. Other locations include the Rössing and Husab mines in Namibia, Kvanefjeld in Greenland, Palabora in South Africa, along with the Radium Hill mine and sites in Southern Australia's Olary Province.

Geological map of the major uranium mines near Bancroft Granite, granitic gneiss Paragneiss para-amphibolite Marble Syenite, syenitic and hybrid gneiss Metagabbro

The key geological features in the Bancroft area relevant to uranium mining are three circular granitic complexes, each about 10 kilometres (6 mi) across. They are (from southwest to northeast):

- The Cheddar complex is a circular double dome of granitic rock surrounded by paragneiss, para-amphibolite, and pyroxene granulite. All these rocks contain younger granitic and syenitic intrusions.
- The Cardiff plutonic complex consists mainly of three southeast-dipping cylindrical sheet intrusions: the Centre Lake granite, the Monck Lake granite, and the Deer Lake syenite. They intrude metasedimentary rocks.
- The Faraday granite is a sheet of granite covered by gneisses and metagabbro. The Faraday granite sheet dips to the south and it is the southern edge of the Hastings Highland gneiss complex.

=== Gems and other resources ===
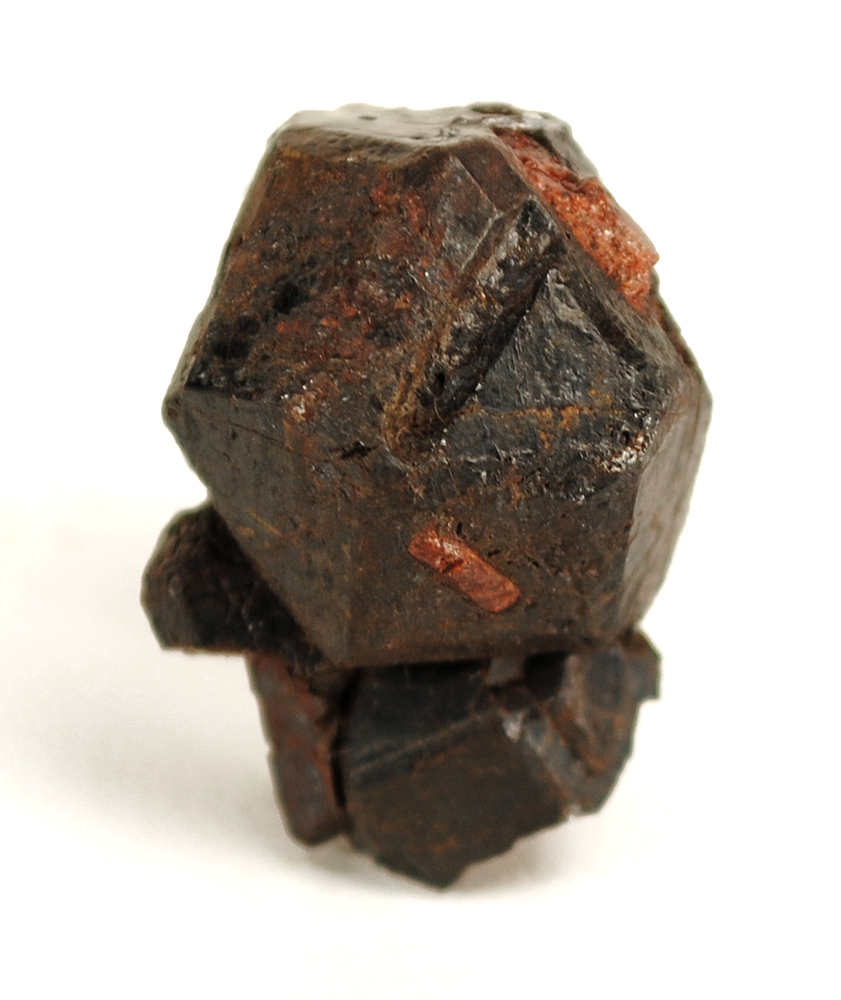
Betafite, zircon collected from Bicroft Mine

Finds of gold in nearby Madoc, Ontario, (then known as Eldorado) from 1886 to 1887, inspired many to seek gold around Bancroft. Surface gold was found in October 1897 by R. Bradshaw, 32 km (20 mi) southwest of Bancroft (towards Bobcaygeon). This triggered a rush of prospectors to the area. Iron and magnetic ores were mined from 1882, gold, copper and mica from the late 1890s, and marble from 1911. More than 1,600 identifiable minerals and non-metallic collectibles can be found in the area, including 175 species of gemstones.

Aside from uranium, mines in the Bancroft area produced sought-after gemstones of 175 species, most notably calcite, clinohumite, corundum, diopside, dravite, edenite, euxenite-(Y), ferri-fluoro-katophorite, fluorapatite, fluorite, fluoro-richterite, ilmenite, kainosite-(Y), molybdenite, nepheline, phlogopite, crystals of the pyrochlore supergroup, thorite, titanite, tremolite, uraninite, uranophane, and zircon. Madawaska Mine produced samples of the very rare kainosite-(Y), globally renowned samples of the common calcite and fluorite, "superb" samples of ilmenite, and "fine" samples of molybdenite.

Resources (other than uranium and gems) extracted in the Bancroft area
From	Resource	Locations mined
1882	Iron	Coe Hill, Mayo (now Carlow/Mayo), Egan Creek (now Bancroft)
1882	Magnetic ore, arsenical pyrites and quartz	Bradshaw
1897	Gold	Bancroft
1898	Corundum	Carlow, Raglan
1899	Copper	Dungannon, Cardiff, Maynooth
1899	Mica	Cardiff, Paudash Lake
1905	Sodalite	Princess Sodalite Mine, near Bancroft
1911	Marble	Faraday, Dungannon

Marble mined in Bancroft was used to make the floor of the Whitney Block and the Royal Ontario Museum.

== Uranium mining ==
Locations of locations around Bancroft. 1 - Faraday/Madawaska, 2 - Bicroft Mine, 3 - Dyno Mine, 4 - Greyhawk Mine, 5 - Cheddar Ghost town

Uranium was first discovered in the area of Cardiff, Ontario, in 1922 by prospector W. M. Richardson. His find was first called "the Richardson deposit" and later "the Fission property" and is located 2 kilometres (1.2 mi) east of the Wilberforce community of Cardiff township. Between 1929 and 1931, attempts were made to extract radon from the uranium ore dug from a tunnel driven into a hill.

In 1943, during World War II, global interest in mining uranium escalated. The government sent geologists to Bancroft, who concluded that all known uranium deposits were unviable due to accessibility, size and uranium concentration. 1948 saw an increase in private staking of claims for uranium, but due to the difficulties in extracting uranium from lower grade ore, none developed into mines.

In 1953, "intelligent prospecting and excellent preliminary exploration" by G. W. Burns, R. J. Steele and Arthur H. Shore led successful prospecting of the area. Between 1953 and 1956, 100 claims were staked around Bancroft and at approximately the same time, another ten mines were started in the Elliot Lake area. Burns and Steele discovered the Central Lake deposits, which were developed into Bicroft Mine, while Shore's prospect became the Faraday Mine.Activity in the mid-1950s was described by engineer A. S. Bayne in a 1977 report as the "greatest uranium prospecting rush in the world".

Uranium mining operations in the Bancroft area were conducted at four sites, beginning in the early 1950s and concluding by 1982. Each of these used underground hard-rock mining methods to access and collect uranium ores from the surrounding granite and gneiss. The mines were:

Major uranium mines in the Bancroft area
Mine (years active)	Geological feature	Ore milled	Uranium oxide produced
Faraday Mine (1954–1964)	Faraday Granite	2,522,032 tonnes (2,780,064 short tons)	3,322,500 kg (7,324,858 lb)
Madawaska Mine (1976–1982)	Faraday Granite	1,643,097 tonnes (1,811,204 short tons)	3,322,500 kg (7,324,858 lb)
Bicroft Mine (1957–1963)	Cardiff Complex	2,470,000 tonnes (2,720,000 short tons)	1957–1960: 49,904 kg (133,693 lb); 1961–1962: 127,659 kg (342,000 lb); 1962–1963: 430,000 kg (950,000 lb)
Dyno Mine (1958–1960)	Cheddar Granite	598,200 tonnes (659,403 short tons)	368,943 kg (813,381 lb)
Greyhawk Mine (1957–1959, 1976–1982)	Faraday Granite	1957–1959: 72,799 tonnes (80,247 short tons)	50,407 kg (111,128 lb)

=== Bicroft Mine ===
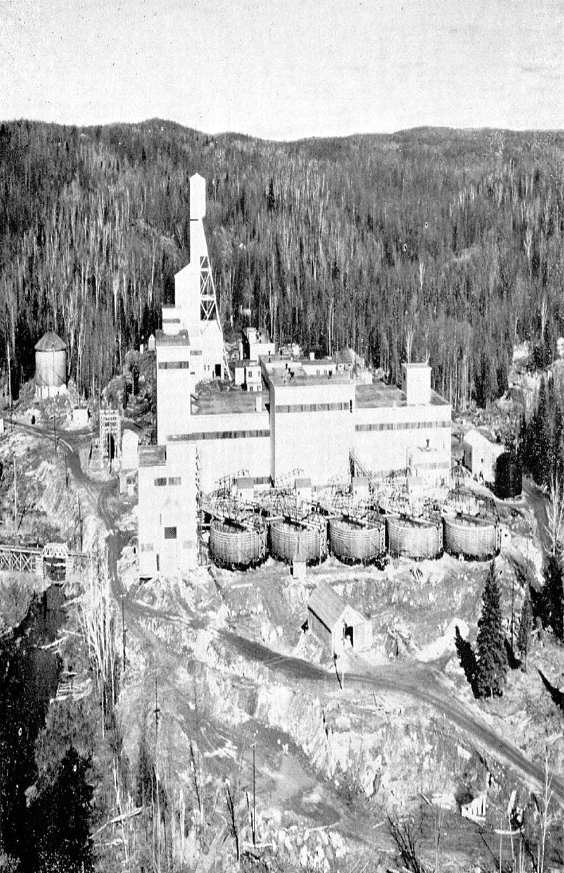
Bicroft mine in 1956

In 1952 G. W. Burns, an amateur prospector from Peterborough, found uranium deposits 16 kilometres (10 mi) southwest of Bancroft, near Cardiff township and Paudash Lake. At another property near Centre Lake (between Cheddar and Cardiff), he observed purple rocks which he knew to be fluorspar, an indicator of radioactive geology. He brought the samples to Robert Steele in Peterborough who used a Geiger counter to confirm their radioactivity. The two then formed a partnership and immediately began staking land claims. Their slow careful staking disadvantaged them as others rushed to the area and staked their own claims; nonetheless, their work paid off and they started mining what the Geological Survey of Canada (GCS) confirmed to be uraninite.

In late 1952, Burns sold his property to a Toronto syndicate that formed into the Centre Lake Uranium Mines Limited, led by C. C. Huston. The company worked on the surface, opened an adit and started diamond drilling, mostly every 30 metres (100 ft), sometimes 15 m (50 ft) between the holes. A shaft was created in 1954. Simultaneous to this, Croft Uranium Mines Limited, a subsidiary of Macassa Mines Limited, formed in 1953 and discovered uranium north of the original site. In 1955 the two sites were merged under the ownership of Bicroft Uranium Mines Limited, with work focused on the Centre Lake part of the property. A shaft was sunk to 400 metres (1,300 ft) and ten levels created. A treatment plant capable of processing 1,000 tonnes (1,100 short tons) of ore per day was built and operations started in late 1956. Production in 1957 was 183,828 kg (405,271 lb) of U_{3}O_{8} from ore with a grade of 0.0859%. Production increased to 1,200 tonnes (1,300 short tons) per day in 1958 and exploration started to the south of the site. Mining continued until 1963, producing about 247,000 tonnes (243,000 long tons; 272,000 short tons) of uranium ore.

2,284,421 tonnes (2,248,342 long tons; 2,518,143 short tons) of tailings remain on site in two impoundments. Repairs to the decommissioned site, including the addition of vegetation over the tailings, were completed in 1980. Subsequent upgrades of the dams were completed in the 1990s. The site is now a wetlands.

The uranium deposits of Bicroft mine occur in a set of eastward-dipping en-echelon lens-shaped dykes of syenite and granite, up to 24 m (80 ft) wide and 120 m (400 ft) long, which extend over an area of about 4.5 square kilometres (1.75 sq mi) within a north–south oriented belt of amphibolite and paragneiss (the eastern part of the Centre Lake granite). The ore minerals are uranothorite and uraninite. The uranium-to-thorium ratio is variable. Pyroxene-rich granite of this area is richer in thorium.

=== Faraday Mine/Madawaska Mine ===
The area that is now known as Madawaska Mine was first mapped by Jack Satterly in the early 1950s.

Arthur H. Shore, an independent prospector, first found uranium at his lot on Faraday township in 1949. He founded Faraday Uranium Mines Limited in 1949, but injured himself shortly afterwards. Newkirk Mining Corporation led work in 1952, including diamond drilling in December 1952 which helped identify seven main zones of uranium ore. Further drilling the following year identified additional deposits to a depth of 150 metres (500 ft). 1954 drilling found more uranium and adits were created. By 1955 it was established that there were 1,506,820 tonnes (1,660,980 short tons) of ore that was 0.112% U_{3}O_{8} (uranium oxide). A sale price was agreed in January 1956. A 263-metre-deep (863 ft) shaft was sunk from an adit, from which five levels were established. A treatment plant with a 680-tonne-per-day (750-short-ton) capacity was built and operations started in April 1957. In 1958, the treatment capacity was increased to 1,220 tonnes (1,350 short tons) per day in order to support processing of ore from Greyhawk Mine. Production in 1957 was 183,828 kg (405,271 lb) from ore with a grade of 0.0859% U_{3}O_{8}. Between 1948 and 1964 Faraday Mine had produced $54 million of ore.

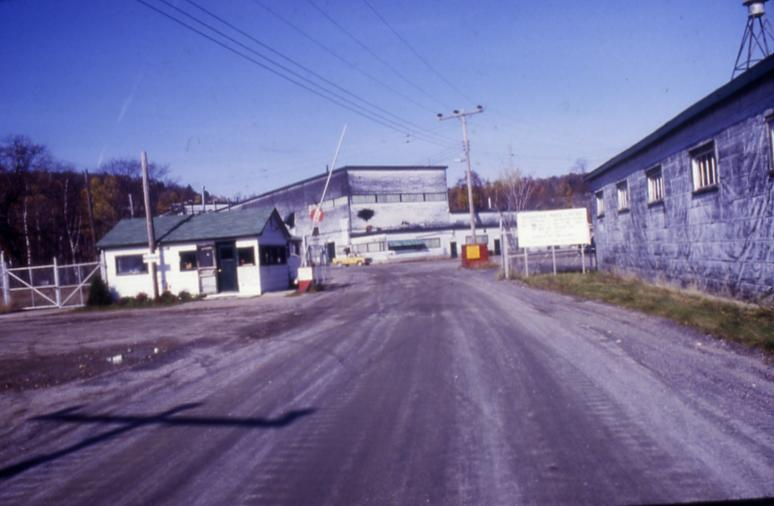
Madawaska Mine entrance c. 1985

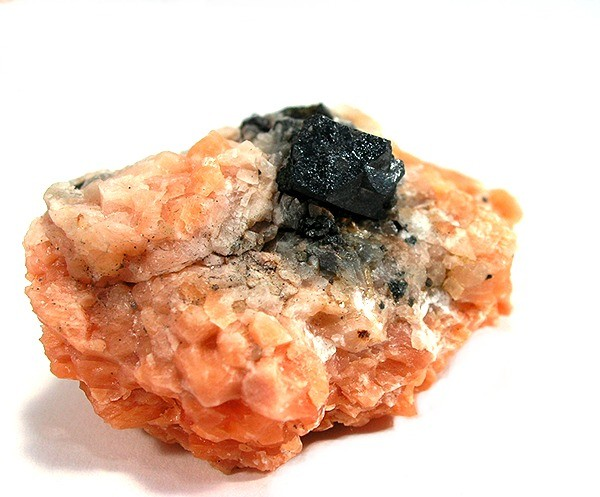
A lustrous, black, octahedral crystal of uraninite on orange calcite, from Bancroft

After $7 million of investment to rehabilitate the mine, it reopened as the Madawaska Mine in 1976 and production continued to 1982. The shaft into the uranium-bearing pegmatite reached a depth of 473 metres (1,552 ft). During this period, the mine was producing 1,400 tonnes (1,500 short tons) of ore per day.

In 2015, inspections found improper surface protection of the tailings and the site has been undergoing rehabilitation.

At the Faraday and Madawaska mines, lens-shaped bodies of ore occur in granitic pegmatite dykes within an area of steeply-dipping amphibolite and metagabbro at the southern edge of the Faraday granite. Uraninite and uranothorite are the principal ore minerals at Faraday and Madawaska. Other radioactive minerals found at this locality include allanite, cyrtolite (a uranium-thorium rich variety of zircon), uranophane-α and uranophane-β. The uranium-to-thorium ratio is about 2-to-1. Uranium ore concentrations range from 0.07 to 0.4 per cent U_{3}O_{8} (uranium-oxide.)

=== Dyno Mine ===
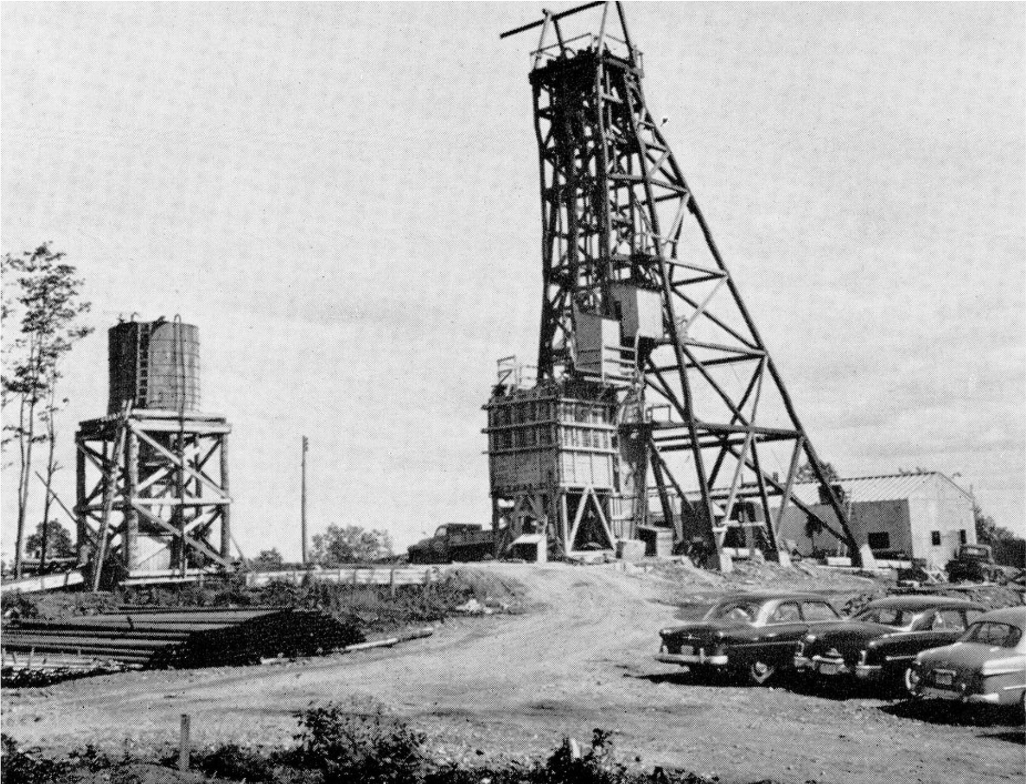
Dyno Mine in 1956

Prospector Paul Mullette discovered radioactive occurrences in November 1953 that were sold to Dyno Mines Limited (later Canadian Dyno Mines Limited). The company undertook diamond drilling that same month simultaneous to geological mapping. This identified three zones, resulting in drilling, which discovered two additional zones. Surface diamond drilling of 124 holes at 61-metre (200 ft) intervals occurred through 1954 and 1955. A 300-metre (1,000 ft) shaft, in the "B" zone, was sunk creating five levels. A price to sell uranium was agreed, and an ore treatment plant with 1,000-tonne-per-day (1,100-short-ton) capacity was started in 1956. Production started in May 1958.

At Dyno mine, at the eastern edge of the Cheddar granite, five zones of ore occur as uranothorite and uraninite in a set of steeply-dipping lens-shaped dykes of pegmatitic granite 0.9 to 20 m (3 to 60 ft) wide, which intrude into gneisses. Ore occurs across the full width of narrower dykes (up to about 3.7 m [12 ft] wide); in wider dykes, ore is usually restricted to only parts of the dyke. The ores are closely associated with a set of north–south trending fractures. Ore concentrations vary from 0.05 to more than 1.00 per cent U_{3}O_{8}, averaging 0.093 per cent. The ore often contains magnetite, particularly where the ore is of higher grade. Cyrtolite and allanite also occur.

=== Greyhawk Mine ===
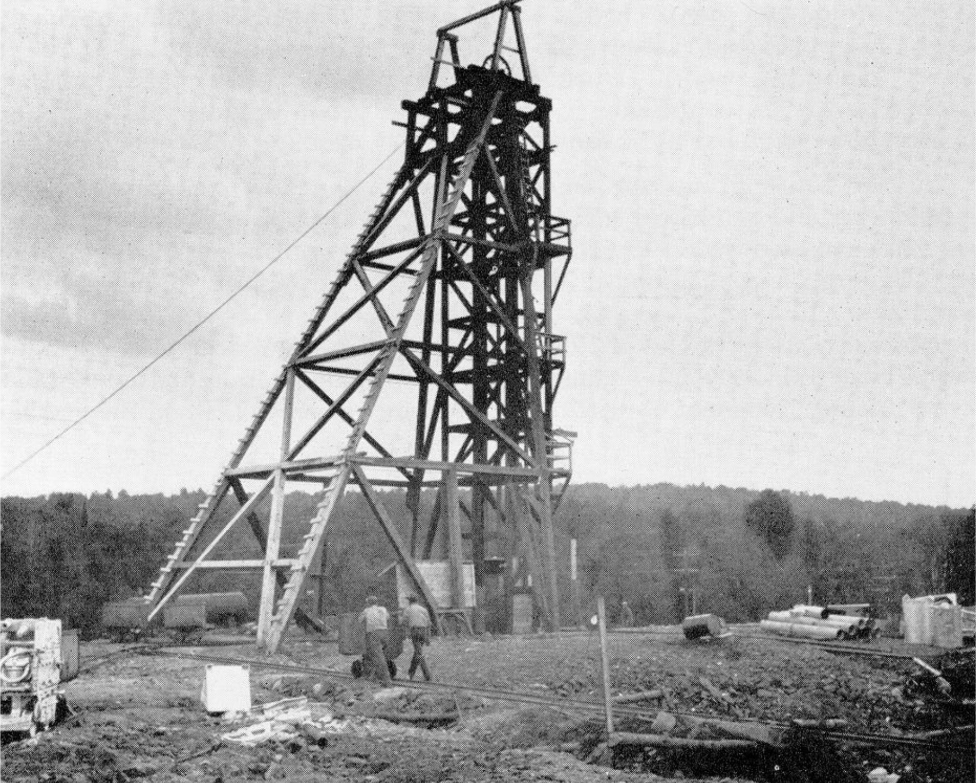
Greyhawk Mine in 1956

Radioactive materials were first discovered in Faraday Township in 1955 by K. D. Thompson and M. Card, two employees of Goldhawk Porcupine Mines Limited who were surveying with Geiger counters. They found exposed rock to be radioactive across a 18-by-91-metre (60 by 300 ft) area. Ownership subsequently shifted to Greyhawk Uranium Mines Limited. Diamond drilling followed at 15- to 122-metre (50 to 400 ft) intervals at 140-metre (450 ft) depth. An exploration shaft was begun in 1956 and three levels created. Operations uncovered no high-grade ore deposits, leaving the average grade below that of other Bancroft mines. Mining operations subsequently stopped in 1959.

Ore was transferred for processing at the Faraday Mine site, starting August 1957 at a rate of about 180 tonnes (200 short tons) per day. By the end of 1957, 17,752 tonnes (19,568 short tons) at a value of $12.6 per tonne ($11.4/short ton) had been shipped. Through 1958, production was 140 tonnes (150 short tons) per day averaging at 0.082% U_{3}O_{8.} The tonnage of ore was 30% less than feasibility estimates.

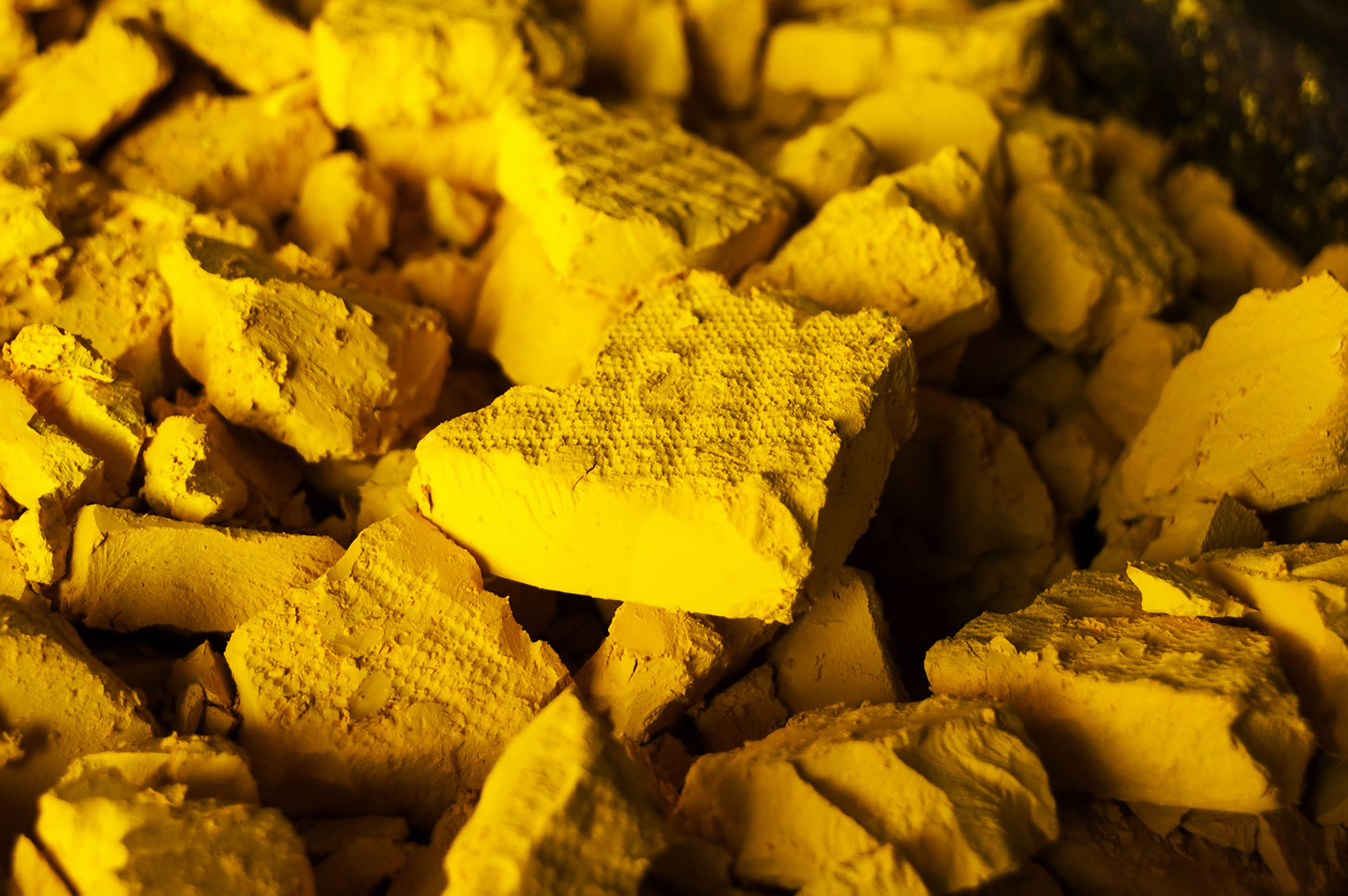
Yellowcake uranium concentrate produced from uranium ore

Faraday Uranium Mines Limited purchased the site in 1962. Madawaska Mines Limited was formed in 1975 and purchased the mine, as well as the Faraday Mine. Mining operations restarted in 1976 and continued until 1982.

After mining, the uranium ore was treated in acid leaching plants located at the mines. The leaching process produced yellowcake high-grade uranium compounds which were either processed further at the Port Hope refinery or sold to the US government for processing in that country. Processing uranium ore from Bancroft cost $3.00 per ton

In the Greyhawk area, metagabbro is intruded by east–west trending pegmatitic granite dykes up to 18 m (60 ft) wide. Ore bodies of uranothorite and uraninite with an average length of 30 m (100 ft) and average width of 1.8 m (6 ft) occur within these pegmatitic dykes, often at the contact with metagabbro. Radioactive minerals are concentrated in the more mafic parts of the host rock. Ores of 0.095 per cent U_{3}O_{8} have been reported from this area.

=== Other mines ===
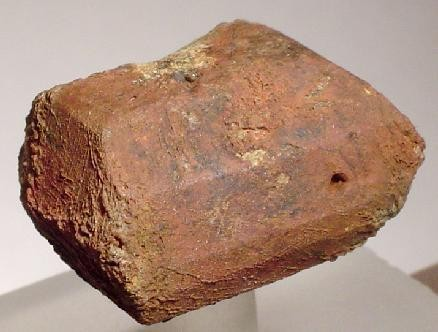
Thorite crystal, from Kemp Uranium Mine

Located at 44°59′53.22″N 78°9′42.15″W, the Kemp Uranium Mine, sometimes called the Kemp Property or Kemp Prospect, produced uranium and a world-class specimen of thorite between 1954 and 1955.

Nu-Age Uranium Mines Limited owned the Old Smokey Occurrence, also known as the Tripp property and the Montgomery property. Surveying was done by Nu-Age Uranium Mines in 1955 and by Imperial Oil Limited in 1975. Although a 50-ton-per-day concentrator was known to be on site in the 1950s, the production quantities are unknown.

Blue Rock Cerium Mines Limited started exploratory work for a mine at a location in Monmouth township (now known as Highlands East, Ontario) during 1954. Silver Crater Mines company purchased the Silver Crater Mine in Cardiff, Ontario in 1953 hoping to find uranium. The mine produced betafite crystals, which contained 15% to 20% uranium.

== Economic and political influence ==
Eldorado Mining and Refining Limited was the crown company that purchased all uranium oxide in Canada; it entered into contracts with mine owners at fixed prices. Faraday Mine alone produced $54 million of uranium ore, creating a rapid economic boom. The mine succeeded due to a combination of economic factors, including Bancroft's geographical proximity to the only uranium processing facility in Canada (located at Port Hope) and a good road and rail network.

Employment of miners in Bancroft started in 1955 and peaked in 1958 at around 1,600 jobs. Mine workers unionized in 1957, forming Local 1006 Bancroft Mine and Mill Worker's Union. Housing for miners was quickly established around the mines and in nearby Bancroft village, which extended to cover ten square kilometres (4 sq mi). Other construction quickly followed, including two single-men's bunkhouses, a canteen, an eleven-room school, an ice-curling rink, and a recreation center. In 1957, a swimming pool was started.

By 1958, Canada had become one of the world's leading producers of uranium; the $274 million of uranium exports that year represented Canada's most significant mineral export. By 1963, the federal government had purchased more than $1.5 billion of uranium from Canadian producers, but soon thereafter the global supply uranium market collapsed and the government stopped issuing contracts to buy.

Mining in Bancroft initially stopped in 1964 due to global reductions in demand for uranium. Local Catholic priest Henry Joseph Maloney (brother of former Ontario Ombudsman Arthur Maloney, and also brother of Minister of Mines James Anthony Maloney) rallied the community to demand support from the provincial and federal governments. Canadian Prime Minister John Diefenbaker, relying on an old agreement with the United Kingdom to buy uranium from Canada, was able to prolong the life of the mine by eighteen months, giving the community time to plan for the closure.

Some mines re-opened during the 1970s energy crisis, although, by the early 1980s, uranium demand was again down, with global energy consumption growing at 2%, much less than the expected 7%. The price of uranium dropped from US$43.57 per pound in 1979 to US$23.50 per pound in March 1982.

Combined with environmental concerns about the nuclear industry following the Three Mile Island accident and increasing costs of building nuclear power plants, circumstances lead to the cancellation of a contract to buy uranium by Italian energy company Agip. While the uranium mining at Elliot Lake continued to grow, the remaining uranium mining in Bancroft ended in 1982, closing the mines and jeopardizing the local economy.

== Regulatory environment ==
The Atomic Energy Control Board (AECB) issued licenses for uranium mines and mills in Canada, and began regulating uranium mines in 1977. As a result of this, mines that closed prior to 1977 (i.e. Bicroft and Dyno Mines) were able to abandon their sites without any regulatory oversight. Faraday Mine/Madawaska Mine and Greyhawk Mine both resumed mining from 1976 until 1982, so their operation and closure had AECB oversight.

Greyhawk Mine's tailings were processed at the mill located at Madawaska Mine, leaving no tailings on site. As a consequence of this, the primary hazards that are regulated are present only at Faraday/Madawaska Mine, and resulted in ongoing environmental monitoring by AECB's successor organization, the Canadian Nuclear Safety Commission (CNSC).

== Mineral and environmental legacy ==
After the closure of the mines, the various tailing sites attracted mineral collectors, especially to the annual Rockbound Gemboree in which tourists travelled to Bancroft in search of gems and minerals. Reserves of 180,000 tonnes (200,000 short tons) of ore, averaging 0.065% U_{3}O_{8}, remain in the ground at Greyhawk Mine. Dyno Mine ran out of uranium ore in 1959. In 2007, a $3 million uranium development project was underway in nearby Haliburton.

1978 and 1980 studies found that the natural weathering of the granite and gabbro rocks left at Greyhawk Mine had caused uranium leaching into the aquifer at concentrations ranging between 1.2 and 380 parts per billion, with higher concentrations measured deeper in the water table and in sediments.

Rural Canadians predominantly rely on groundwater for drinking water supply. Mining activity expanded fissures and widened the area of groundwater contamination. Public health concerns around groundwater contamination focus on uranium and thorium, plus the presence of decay products of both.

1988 background radiation levels at parts of Paudash Lake were twenty times the safety limit and lumps of semi-refined uranium lay in the abandoned Dyno mine buildings. The same year, Crowe Valley Conservation Authority called for greater supervision of radioactive waste. A 2016 Geological Survey of Canada study noted that 70% of ground water samples taken from diamond drilling holes, mine shafts and adits had uranium concentrates above national drinking water safety standards of 0.02 milligrams per litre (1.2×10^{−8} oz/cu in). 2019 sampling found radioactive and hazardous contamination in two of several water samples. Subsequent inspections in 2020 from nearby locations reported water quality to be within provincial standards.

Tailings remain at Bicroft, Madawaska and Dyno mine sites where water sampling by the CNSC is ongoing. Madawaska, Dyno and Greyhawk mines were managed by EWL Management Limited, until February 2022 when it dissolved into its parent company Ovintiv. Bicroft Mine is owned by Barrick Gold; the owners of all four legacy tailing sites at former mines are responsible for the ongoing management of the sites.

== Health legacy for miners ==
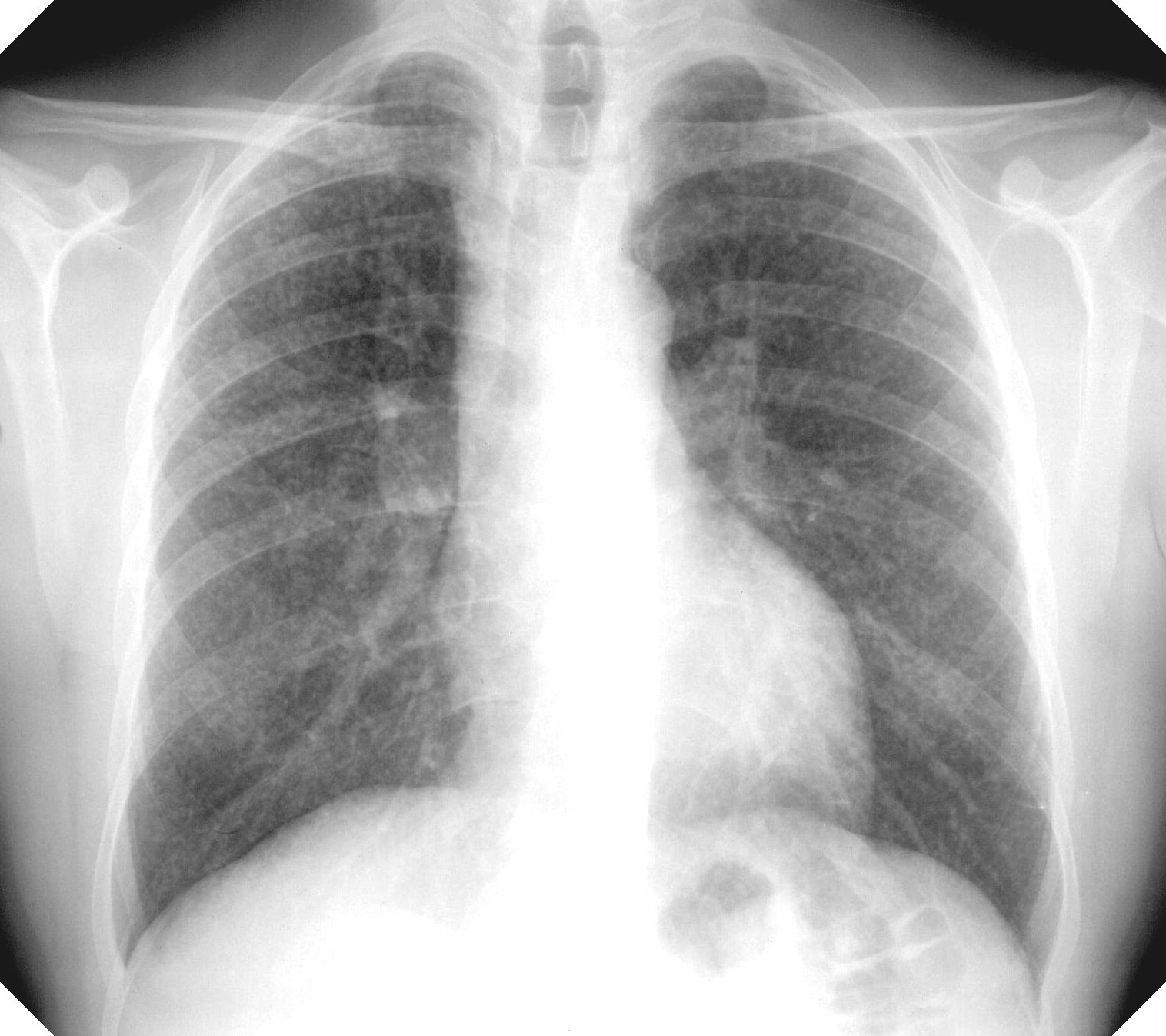
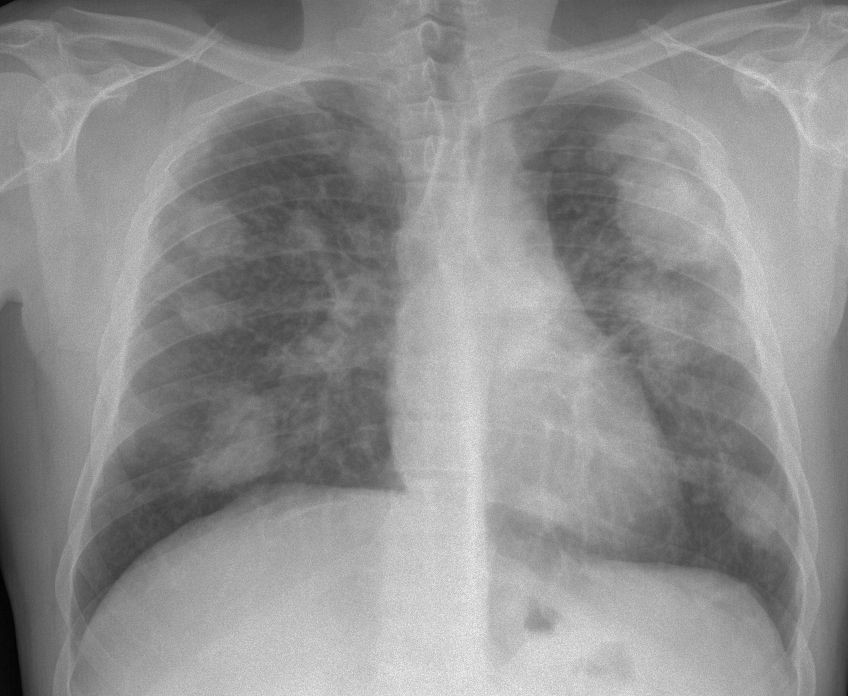
X-rays of patients with simple silicosis (top) and complicated silicosis (bottom)

According to a 2012 study published in Nature, there is a "positive exposure-response between silica and lung cancer". Uranium mining produces silica-laden dust at a free silica rate of 5–15% in Bancroft, significantly less than the Elliot Lake mines which produced ore with 60–70% free silica.

In 1974, the Ontario Workmen's Compensation Board studied 15,094 people who worked in uranium mines in Bancroft and around Elliot Lake for at least one month, between 1955 and 1974. Of those 15,094 people, 94 silicosis cases were found in 1974, of which one was attributed to working a Bancroft mine, i.e. the other 93 were attributed to working in an Elliot Lake mine.

According to the Committee on Uranium Mining in Virginia, mines produce radon gas which can increase lung cancer risks. Miners' exposure to radiation was not measured before 1958 and exposure limits were not enacted until 1968. Risks to miners at Bancroft and Elliot Lake mines were investigated and the official report of that investigation quotes a miner:

"We have been led to believe through the years that the working environment in these mines was safe for us to work in. We have been deceived."

The aforementioned 1974 study of 15,094 Ontario uranium miners found 81 former miners who died of lung cancer. Factoring in predicted lung cancer rate for men in Ontario led to the conclusion that by 1974 there were 36 more deaths than expected attributable to both Bancroft and Elliot Lake mines, with the additional risk appearing to be twice as high for Bancroft miners compared to Elliot Lake miners.

A study report for the CNSC undertaken by the Occupational Cancer Research Centre at Cancer Care Ontario tracked the health of 28,959 former uranium miners over 21 years and found a two-fold increase in lung cancer mortality and incidence. In an article published in The BMJ (journal of the British Medical Association) reported an increase of lung cancer risk; miners who have worked at least 100 months in uranium mines have a twofold increased risk of developing lung cancer. The study is expected to be updated in 2023.

== See also ==
- Uranium mining in the Elliot Lake area
- Royal Commission on the Health and Safety of Workers in Mines
- Uranium ore deposits
- List of uranium mines
- List of mines in the Bancroft area
- List of uranium mines in Ontario
- 1974 Elliot Lake miners strike
