= Silver Crater Mine =

Ontario decommissioned mine

- Location near Cardiff, Ontario Silver Crater Mine (Southern Ontario) Silver Crater Mine (Ontario)
- Location: 45°02′N 78°01′W
- Closed: 1955
- Company: Silver Crater Mines (International Cobalt and Silver Mining Company subsidiary)

Silver Crater Mine, previously known as the Basin Deposit, is an abandoned mine in Cardiff, Ontario, Canada. It has produced some of the world's most notable betafite crystals.

The mine has been worked since the late 19th-century, with industrial mining of mica starting in 1927. Uranium was sought in the 1950s and the mine has been abandoned since 1955.

== Location, nomenclature, and geology ==
Silver Crater mine is located 13 kilometres (8 mi) west of Bancroft. It was previously known as the Basin Deposit or Basic Occurrence.

The mine is located in the Grenville Province geological area. Mining activity enabled access to crustal carbonatite in a biotite-amphibolite and syenitized gneiss rock, located between an area of granite to the north and marble to the south.

Geologists assess that the minerals found at the mine reached the current location about 1,050 or about 1,150 million years ago.

== History and activities ==
Prospectors have worked the area of the mine since the late 19th-century, seeking mica, phosphate, and feldspar.

S. Orser and D. J. Wilson worked the mine in 1925. In 1927, Bancroft Mining Company started excavations and found a cavity holding albite, fluorite, pyrite, sphene, and apatite crystals on the cavity floor. Pits were dug around the mine from which mica crystals as large as four-feet across were harvested until the 1940s. Between the mica formatings, apatite, betafite, and lepidomelane were also found.

Bancroft Mica and Stone Products Mining Syndicate operated the mine from 1947 to 1949 and sold the mica which they extracted from a 30 foot by 65 foot wide open pit.

Bancroft Mica and Stone Products Mining Syndicate
| Year | Mica Production |
|---|---|
| 1947 | $738 |
| 1948 | $7,474 |
| 1949 | $7,846 |
| 1950 | $10,353 |

Toronto-based Silver Crater Mines incorporated in 1951, bought the mine in 1953, and operated it from 1953 to 1955, hoping to find uranium, and driving a 70-metre deep adit into the hillside. Silver Crater Mines is a subsidiary of the International Cobalt and Silver Mining Company (incorporated September 19, 1906, Sault Ste. Marie) Mining activity ceased in 1955.

Over the years, the mine has produced world class crystals of titanite, apatite, mica, and zircon. Silver Crater Mine is most noted for its unusual betafite crystals, which geologists have yet to sufficiently analyse to understand their geological origins. Betafite crystals from the mine contain 15% to 20% uranium, making them highly radioactive.

As recently as 2006, rockhounds visited the mine to collect specimens.

== Mineral gallery ==
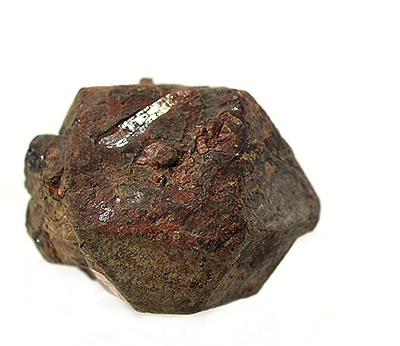
Betafite from Silver Crater Mine

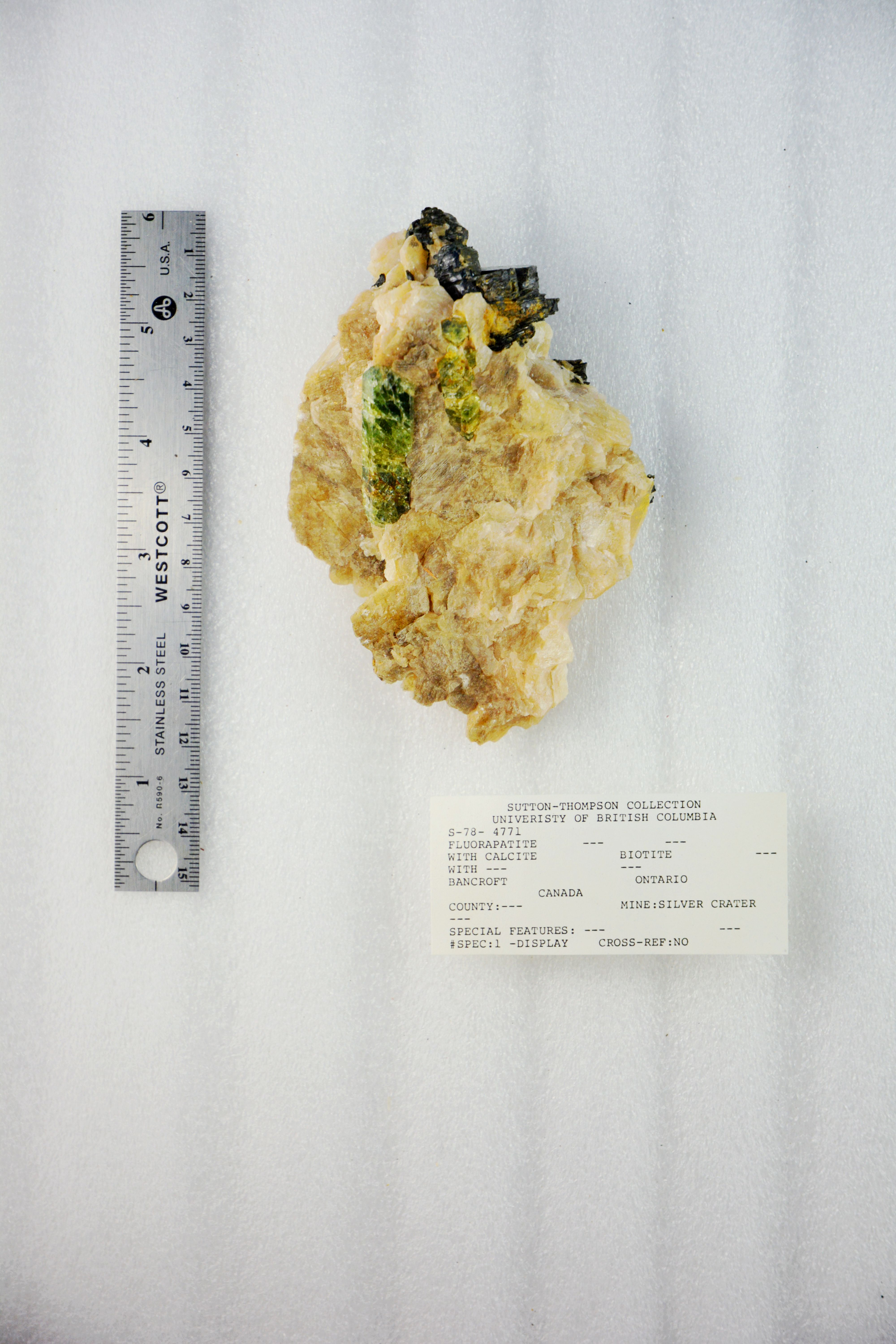
Fluorapatite from Silver Crater Mine

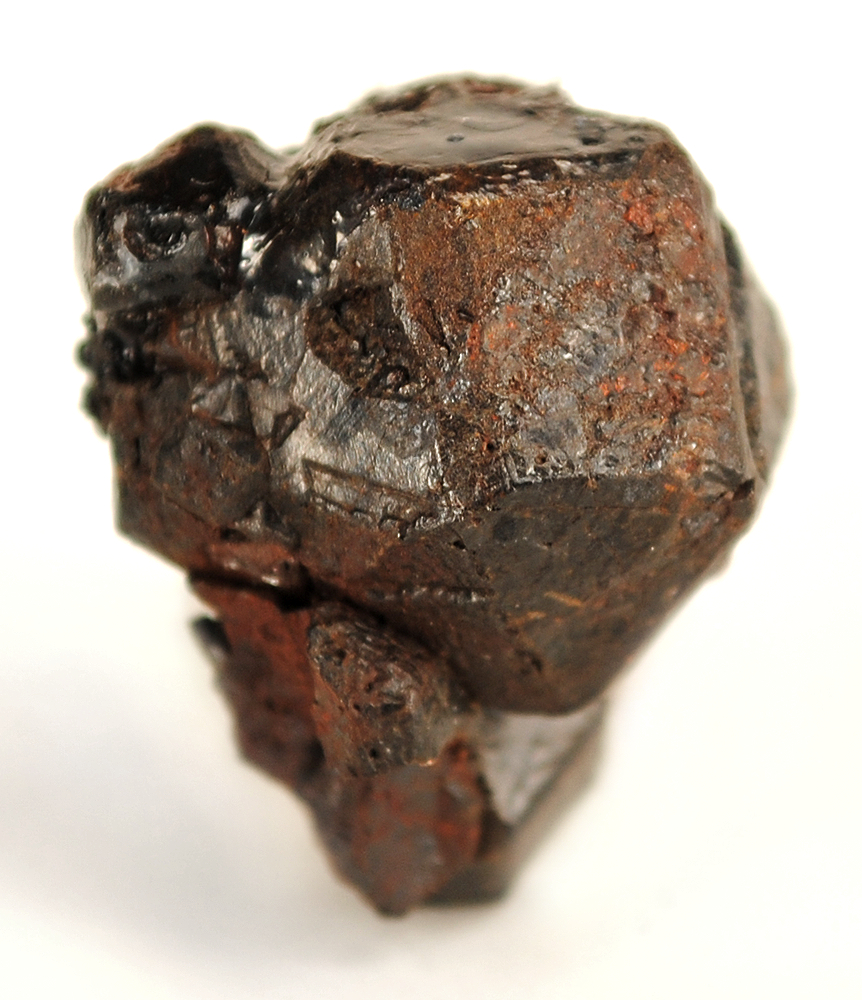
Betafite-Zircon from Silver Crater Mine

== See also ==
- Uranium mining in the Bancroft area
- Grenville orogeny
- List of mines in the Bancroft area
