= Dyno Mine =

Abandoned uranium mine in Ontario, Canada

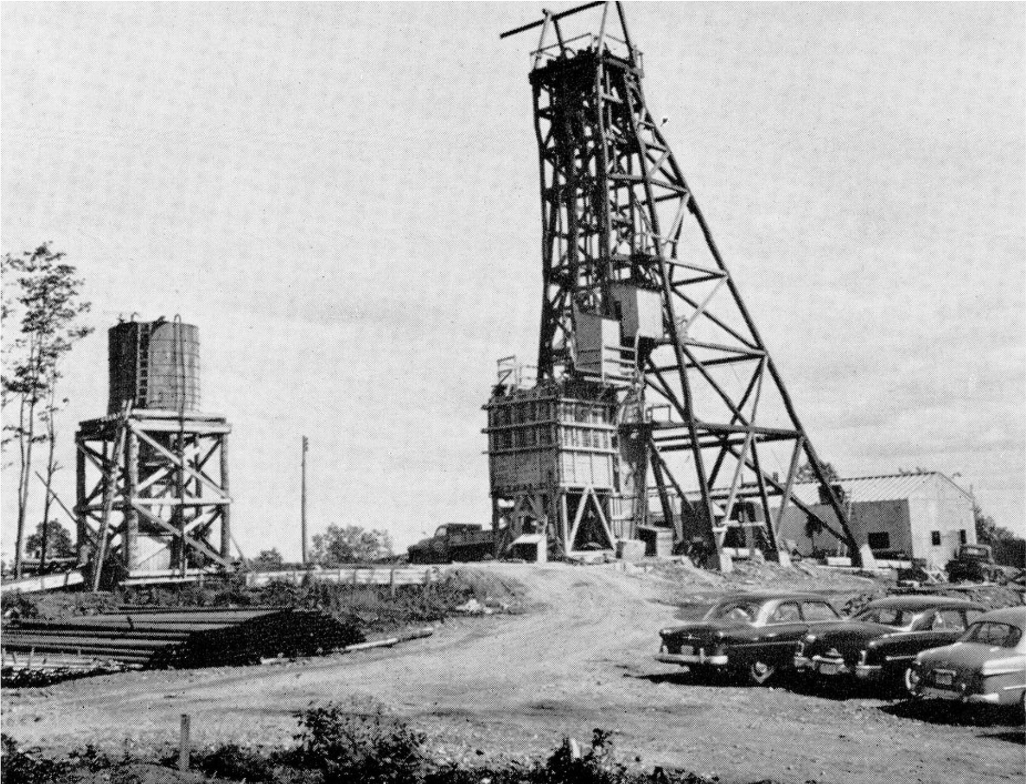
- Mine headframe, 1956

- Location in Cardiff Township, Ontario Dyno Mine (Southern Ontario) Dyno Mine (Ontario)
- Location: Cardiff, Ontario, Ontario, Canada; 44°57′0″N 78°5′52″W
- Products: Uranium oxide
- Production: 363,758 kg
- Opened: 1958
- Closed: 1960
- Company: Ovintiv

Dyno Mine is a decommissioned underground uranium mine located at Cardiff, near Farrel Lake, approximately 30km southwest of Bancroft, Ontario. It operated from 1958 to 1960.

== Uranium discovery - 1922 to 1956 ==
Uranium was first discovered in the area of Cardiff in 1922 by W. M. Richardson. Between 1953 and 1956, one hundred area prospects were opened, including one by Paul Mulliette of Toronto who discovered uranium in 1953, which was developed into Dyno Mine.

== Mine operations - 1956 to 1960 ==
In 1956, brush was cleared to create 200 houses in Cardiff, some for executives of nearby Bicroft Mine and a settlement called Dyno Estates was built near Ontario Highway 28 for executives of Dyno Mine. Other construction quickly followed, including, two single-men's bunkhouses, a canteen, an eleven-room school, an ice-curling rink, and a recreation center. In 1957, a swimming pool was started.

Mining commenced in 1958 via a 525 meter deep shaft. There was a mill on site.

The mine produced to 363,758 kg of U_{3}0_{8} before closing in 1960 when ore supplies were depleted.

== Post mining - 1960 to present day ==
After the closure, the tailing site attracted mineral collectors, especially to the annual Bancroft Rockbound Gemboree in which tourists travelled to Bancroft in search of gems and minerals.

In 1981, ownership transferred to International Mogul Mines Limited. Rehabilitation work was undertaken by AEC West Consultants in 2006. In 2022, EWL Management Limited dissolved into its parent company Ovintiv Canada ULC, and ownership therefore shifted to Ovintiv.

Environmental monitoring by the Canadian Nuclear Safety Commission found no safety risks.

On May 6, 2022, CNSC took regulatory action against Ovintiv. Ovintiv absorbed EWL Management Limited on February 22, 2022 and assumed responsibilities for the mine, but not updated any of the licensing documentation to reflect the change. Using powers of the Nuclear Safety and Control Act, CNSC issued an order for Ovintiv to comply with the licensing requirements previously issued to EWL Management Limited.

== See also ==
- Uranium mining in the Bancroft area
- Uranium ore deposits
- List of uranium mines
- Uranium mining
- List of mines in the Bancroft area
