= List of mines in the Bancroft area =

The following are a list of notable mines and quarries within 50 miles of Bancroft, Ontario.

| Name(s) | Primary mineral(s) | Location | Years active | Type | Owner (and parent companies) |
|---|---|---|---|---|---|
| Bicroft Mine | Uranium | Cardiff | 1957–1963 | Underground | Barrick Gold |
| Dyno Mine | Uranium | Cardiff | 1958–1960 | Underground | Ovintiv |
| Faraday Mine, Madawaska Mine | Uranium | Faraday | 1954–1964, 1975–1982 | Underground | Ovintiv |
| Greyhawk Mine | Uranium | Faraday | 1957–1959, 1976–1982 | Underground | Ovintiv |
| Richardson Mine | Gold | Eldorado | 1867–1869 | Underground | John Richardson (leased to Marcus Herbert Powell), Lombard and Hardin, Kim Woodside |
| Silver Crater Mine | Betafite | Cardiff | 1925–1955 | Open-pit, underground | Bancroft Mica and Stone Products Mining Syndicate, Silver Crater Mines |
| Princess Sodalite Mine | Sodalite | Bancroft | 1892–present | Quarry | Princess Sodalite Mine Rock Shop |

== See also ==
- List of mines in Ontario
- Uranium mining in the Bancroft area
- Bancroft Rockhound Gemboree
