= Bicroft Mine =

Abandoned uranium mine in Ontario, Canada

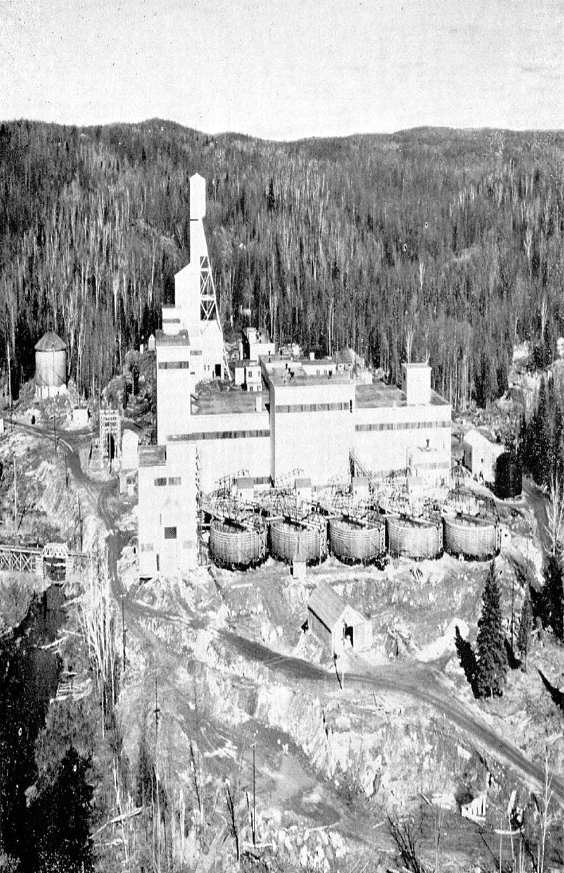
- The mine in 1956

- Location in Bancroft, Ontario Bicroft Mine (Southern Ontario) Bicroft Mine (Ontario)

Location
- Location: Cardiff, Ontario, Canada; 44°59′30.39″N 78°2′16.83″W

Production
- Products: Uranium oxide
- Production: 2,333,106 tonnes

History
- Opened: 1957
- Closed: 1963

Owner
- Company: Barrick Gold

Bicroft Mine is a decommissioned underground uranium mine, located in Cardiff, near Bancroft, Ontario, Canada.

It is one of fourteen former uranium mines in Ontario that is monitored by the Canadian Nuclear Safety Commission, and one of twenty in Canada.

Aside from uranium, the mine has also produced globally renowned samples of Kainosite-(Y).

== Location ==
Bicroft Mine is a decommissioned former underground uranium mine in Cardiff, 19 kilometres (12 mi) southwest of Bancroft, Ontario, Canada.

It is one of four former mines near Bancroft - the others being Faraday Mine/Madawaska Mine, Dyno Mine, and Greyhawk Mine. It is also one of fourteen former uranium mines in Ontario that is monitored by the Canadian Nuclear Safety Commission, and one of twenty of such in Canada.

== Products ==
Aside from uranium, the mine has also produced globally renowned samples of Kainosite-(Y).

== Discovery of uranium - 1922 to 1953 ==
Uranium was first discovered in the area of Cardiff in 1922 by W. M. Richardson. Between 1953 and 1956, one hundred area prospects were opened, including one by Central Lake Uranium Mines Limited that later turned into Bicroft Mine.

== Mining operations - 1953 to 1960 ==
The mine operated from 1957 to 1963 and produced 2,333,106 tonnes of uranium ore at an average concentration of 19 mg of uranium per kg of ore. The 2,284,421 tonnes of tailings are deposited in two impoundments near Cardiff: Auger Lake and South Tailings Basin which flow into Paudash Lake.

The mine employed up to 500 people at its peak.

Bicroft Mine was originally owned by Bicroft Uranium Mines Limited, and is now owned by Barrick Gold.

== Closure and decommissioning - 1960 to present day ==
Repairs to the decommissioned site, included adding vegetation over the tailings, were completed in 1980. Subsequent upgrades of the dams were completed in the 1990s. The site is now a wetland.

Water sampling completed by the Canadian Nuclear Safety Commission in 2019 confirmed that the site produces no risk to the environment or ecology.

In September 2020, Barrick Gold requested to renew their waste nuclear substance license. The Canadian Nuclear Safety Commission renewed the license on 24 February 2021. The license will expire on 29 February 2036.

== See also ==
- Uranium mining in the Bancroft area
- Uranium ore deposits
- List of uranium mines
- Uranium mining
- List of mines in the Bancroft area
