= 1974 Elliot Lake miners strike =

Uranium miners strike

- Date: April 18, 1974 52 years ago
- Location: Denison Mine, Elliot Lake; 46°29′44.15″N 082°36′00.85″W
- Type: Wildcat strike action
- Participants: Elliot Lake miners

The Elliot Lake Miners Strike was a wildcat strike by approximately 1,000 uranium miners who worked at Denison uranium mine in the Elliot Lake area of Ontario, Canada. The strike was the first time that Canadian workers had taken industrial action over safety concerns, and it led to Ontario Premier Bill Davis creating a royal commission which led to the creation of new health and safety legislation.

== Background ==
Concerned about prevalence of cancers and poor support for sick workers by mine owners, United Steelworkers representatives had been meeting with the Government of Ontario, the leader of the opposition New Democratic Party, and the Workman's Compensation Board of Ontario. At the time, the union activities were led by Gib Gilchrist, who was supported by Paul Falkowski and Homer Seguin.

Immediately prior to the strike, two representatives of United Steelworkers, attended a conference in Bordeaux, France. At the conference, they learned about a paper presented by the Ontario Ministry of Health that contained details about cancer risks to uranium miners, that had not been shared with the miners.

== The strike ==
On 18 April 1974, the workers at Denison mine (owned by Denison Mines) started a wildcat strike that lasted fourteen days. The strike was supported by Ontario New Democratic Party leader Stephen Lewis and Member of Provincial Parliament Elie Martel.

Ed Vance, one of the striking miners, is quoted in the 2016 book Health and Safety in Canadian Workplaces:

"They deliberately kept us ignorant. There is no other way to describe it. Government has a responsibility and in this case they failed to keep the workers advised. They failed to warn the workers of their work environment. And, they were part of that conspiracy."

== Effects ==
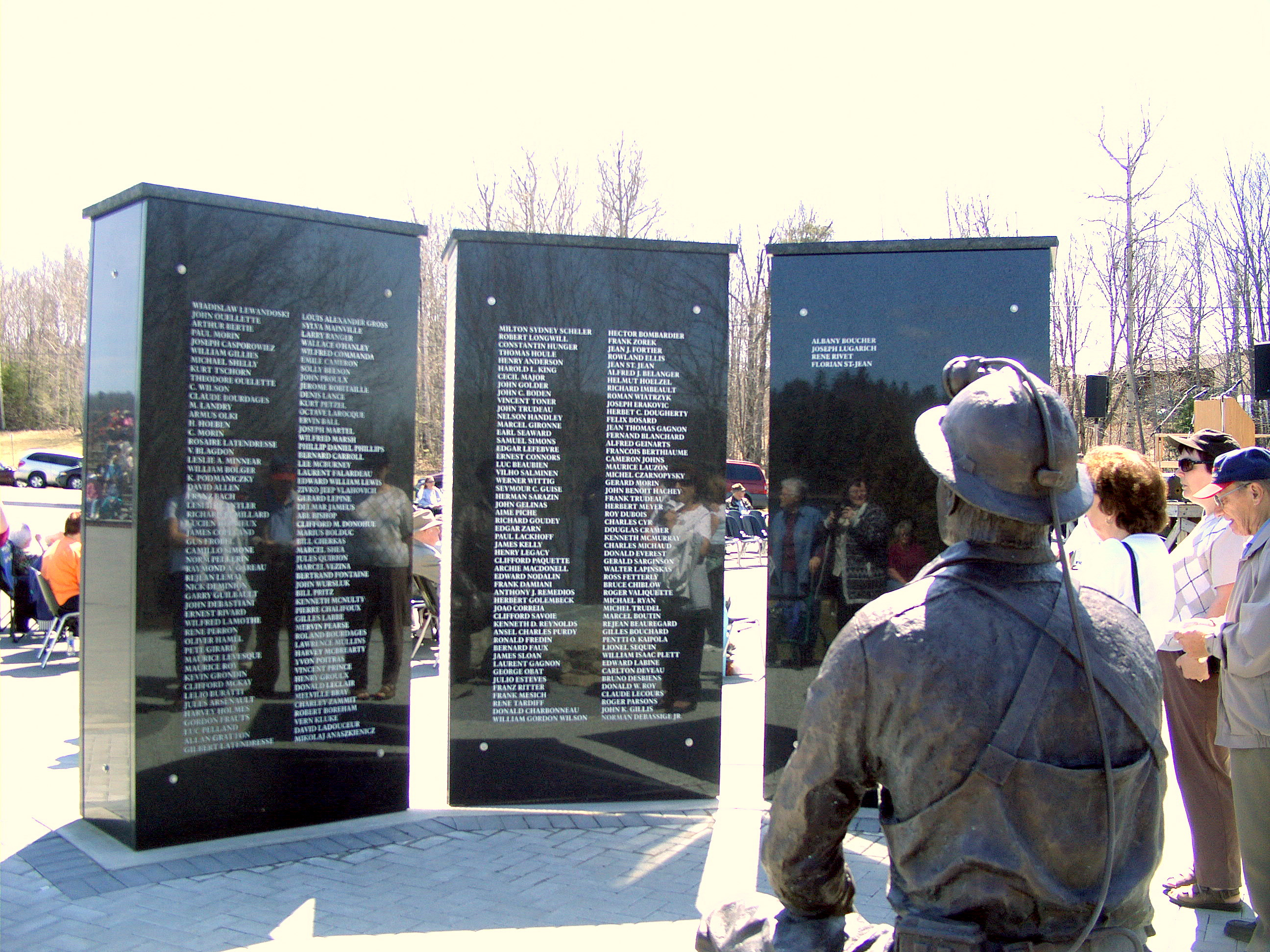
The Miner's Memorial is a tribute to the mining history of Elliot Lake, ON. This part is a tribute to all the miners who died as a result of working in the uranium mines.

Mine owners immediately allowed miners to change the filters in their protective face-masks daily, an improvement from the existing weekly replacements, and soon after offered a 15 cent per hour increase in living allowance.

The government embarked on air-quality testing in the mines, but was criticized for missing some areas. Following the survey, mine owners improved underground ventilation.

Pressure from the workers, combined with the political pressure, led to the creation of the Royal Commission on the Health and Safety of Workers in Mines, informally known as the Ham Commission after its chairperson, James Milton Ham.

The recommendations from the royal commission led to the creation of Ontario's Occupational Health and Safety Act of 1979.

== See also ==
- Uranium mining in the Elliot Lake area
- Uranium mining in the Bancroft area
- Uranium mining in Canada
