= Cardiff, Ontario =

Community in Ontario, Canada

Cardiff
- Unincorporated community
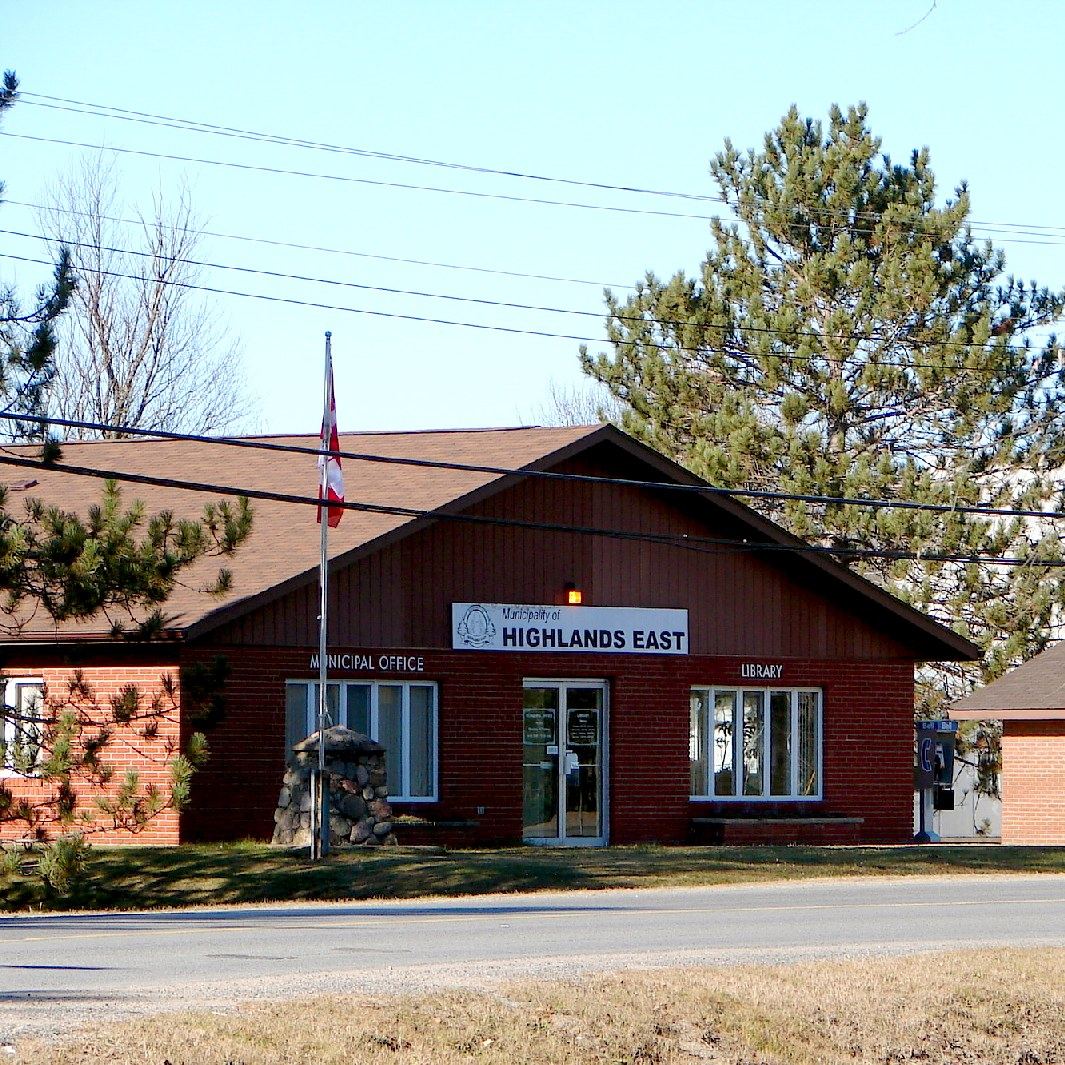
- Town hall of Highlands East Township in Cardiff

- Location within Southern Ontario
- Coordinates: 44°59′58″N 78°00′49″W
- Country: Canada
- Province: Ontario
- County: Haliburton
- Municipality: Highlands East
- Founded: 1862
- Time zone: UTC-5 (EST)
  - Summer (DST): UTC-4 (EDT)
- Postal code: K0L 1M0, K0L 1M1
- Area code: 705

Cardiff is a community in Highlands East, Ontario, Canada. It was incorporated in 1862 as part of Cardiff Township, and became a uranium mining town during the late 1950s.

== Location and nomenclature ==
Cardiff is located on Highway 118 between the towns of Bancroft and Haliburton. The entrance to the townsite, off of Highway 118, is marked by a large metal sculpture of a dragonfly.

Cardiff was named after the Welsh city of the same name.

== History ==
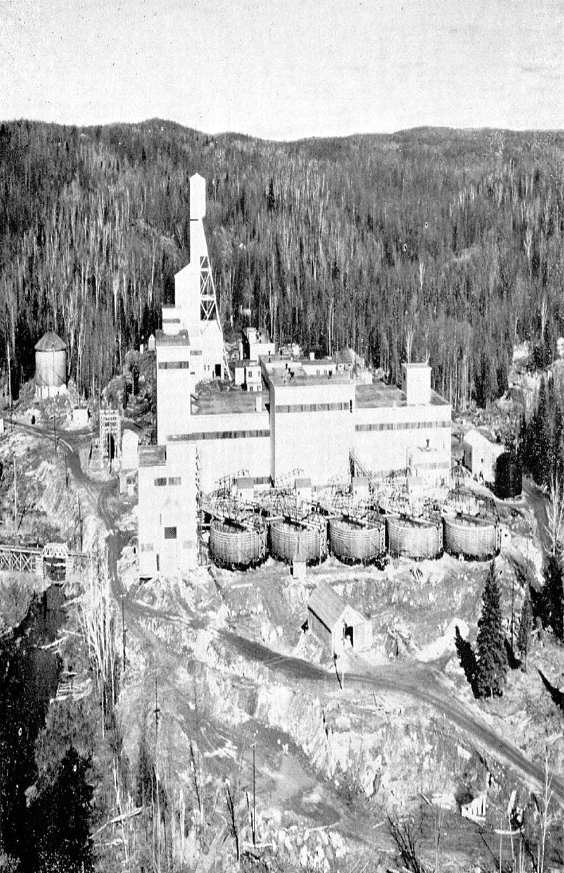
Bicroft mine, 1956

Cardiff is located in the geological area of the Grenville Province and has a unique combination of underground minerals.

Cardiff opened in 1862, and was one of nine townships purchased by the Canadian Land and Emigration Company. Early settlers included Mr Armstrong, Mr George Patterson, and Mr Joseph Dunlop. Larger numbers of British settlers arrived in 1870, with the population reaching 31 in 1873, and 137 by 1883.

In what was then known as the Basin Deposit or Basic Occurrence, mineral hunters have been travelling to the area that is now Cardiff in search of mica, phosphate, and feldspar to Cardiff since the late 19th-century. The Basin Deposit later became the Silver Crater Mine in 1925, and production ramped up in 1927 until 1955.

Uranium was first discovered in the area of Cardiff in 1922 by W. M. Richardson. His find was first called "the Richardson deposit" and later "the Fission property," later the Fission Mine. Bicroft and Dyno were more successful uranium mines, operating from 1957 to 1963.

== Facilities ==
Public facilities in Cardiff include the small Cardiff Elementary School, a Royal Canadian Legion hall, a Catholic church and a United church, an outdoor swimming pool, a post office, and a library.
