= Fission Mine =

Canadian uranium mine

- Cardiff, Ontario Fission Mine (Southern Ontario) Fission Mine (Ontario)
- Location: Cardiff, Ontario, Canada; 45°06′N 78°18′W
- Discovered: 1922
- Opened: 1929
- Closed: 1931
- Company: The Ontario Radium Corporation (1920s); Fission Mines Limited (1930s/40s)

The Fission Mine, previously known as the Richardson Deposit, is a fluoride and uranium deposit in Cardiff, near Wilberforce, Ontario, Canada.

== Location and geology ==
The mine is located two kilometres east of Wilberforce on lot four, concession 21 of Cardiff Township.

The underground minerals are within pegmatite rock.

== History ==
Uranium was first discovered at the location in 1922, by prospector W. M. Richardson. His find was first called "the Richardson deposit" and later "the Fission property"

In 1929, the mine was owned by Toronto company The Ontario Radium Corporation. The same year, Ontario Mine's Branch geologists Hugh S. Spence and R. K. Carnochan reported the several hundred pounds of radioactive materials found exceeded all known quantities of uranium in Canada and all ore bodies that they were aware of anywhere in the world. Combined with being close to the surface, and easier to mine due to being held in softer ore, the mine was assessed as being commercially viable and able to produce 1 gram of radium, worth $70,000 at the time. In 1929, the global cumulative supply of radium to date was 300 grammes, growing at 50 grammes per year.

Between 1929 and 1931, unsuccessful attempts were made to extract radon from the uranium ore via a tunnel driven into a hill.

More radioactive materials were discovered in the mine around 1935, and again during World War II, with owners Fission Mines Limited offered 200,000 shares at $1.00 each to fund further development of the property in 1949. The exploration turned out to be not economically viable.

== See also ==
- Uranium mining in the Bancroft area
- List of uranium projects
