= Princess Sodalite Mine =

Quarry in Ontario, Canada

Princess Sodalite Mine (previously the Princess Sodalite Quarry) is a sodalite quarry and retail shop, located near Bancroft, Ontario. The sodalite deposit was first discovered in 1892.

== Nomenclature and history ==
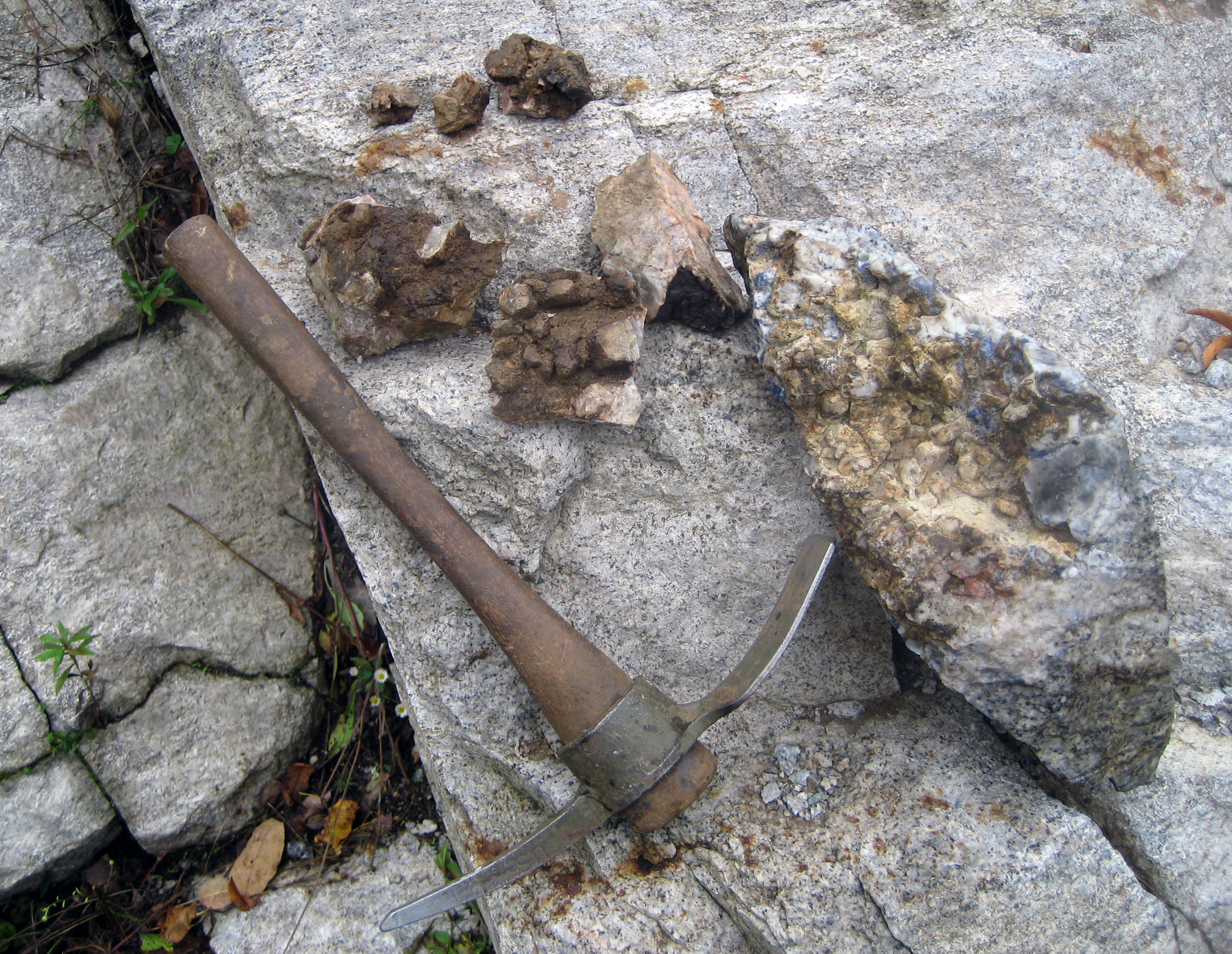
Nepheline crystals at the mine, 2013

The mineral deposit was first found by Frank Dawson Adams in 1892. Sodalite from the quarry was displayed at the Columbian Exposition in Chicago in 1893. The Princess of Wales was given a gift of sodalite from the quarry in 1901 at the Pan-American Exposition in Buffalo, New York. She liked it so much that she ordered a shipment to decorate Marlborough House, in London, England. Thomas Morrison, the quarry's owner at the time, named the quarry the Princess Sodalite Quarry after her visit. The Quarry name continued through the 20th century until at least 2002.

In 1999, the owners of the quarry donated a sodalite boulder to the Earth Sciences Museum at the University of Waterloo in Ontario.
The quarry was owned by Paul Rasmussen and Carl Bosiak, the 8th owners, who sold it to the ninth owner Andy Christie.

== Location and geology ==
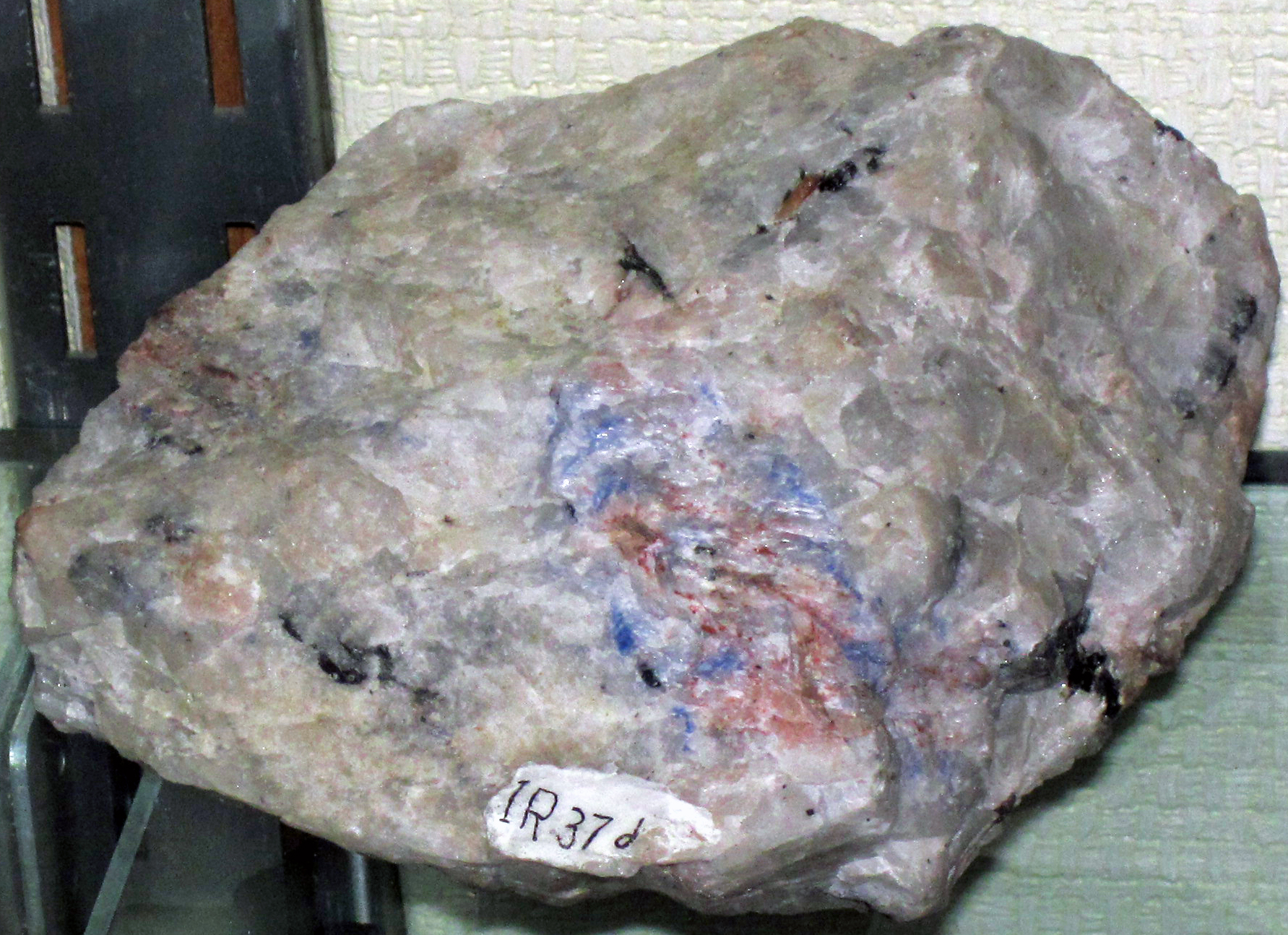
Sodalite from near Bancroft

The quarry is located four kilometres east of Bancroft, Ontario on Ontario Highway 28. It is on rock with calcite vein-dikes that intruded into nepheline gneiss rock, with nepheline prismatic crystals attached to the walls of the dikes.

The quarry is the only source of sodalite in Ontario, where it was once nominated (but ultimately rejected) to be the official provincial mineral.

== See also ==
- List of mines in the Bancroft area
