= Grenville orogeny =

Mesoproterozoic mountain-building event

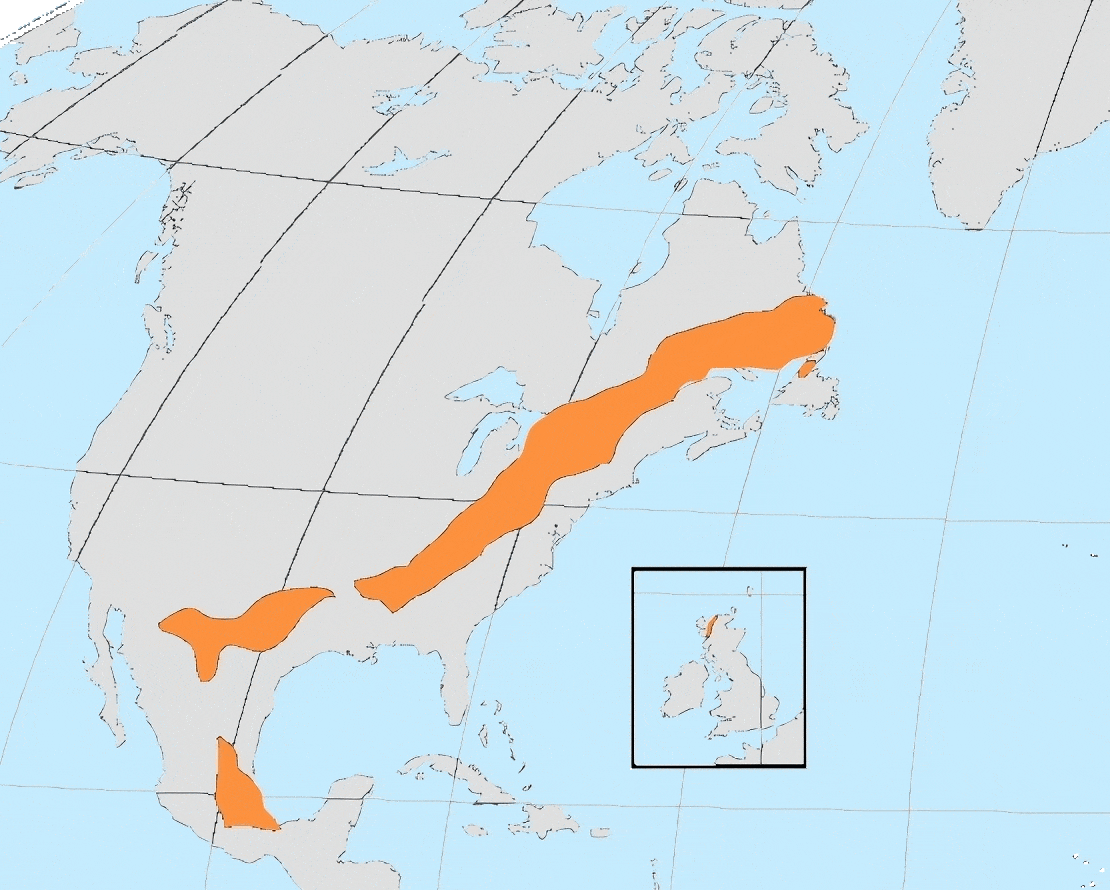
Extent (orange regions) of the Grenville orogeny, after Tollo et al. (2004) and Darabi (2004)

The Grenville orogeny was a long-lived Mesoproterozoic mountain-building event associated with the assembly of the supercontinent Rodinia. Its record is a prominent orogenic belt which spans a significant portion of the North American continent, from Labrador to Mexico, as well as to Scotland.

Grenville orogenic crust of mid-late Mesoproterozoic age (c.1250—980 Ma) is found worldwide, but generally only events which occurred on the southern and eastern margins of Laurentia are recognized under the "Grenville" name. These orogenic events are also known as the Kibaran orogeny in Africa, the Dalslandian orogeny in Western Europe, and the Sunsás orogeny in Brazil.

== Timescale ==
The problem of timing the Grenville orogeny is an area of some contention. The timescale outlined by Toby Rivers in 2002 is derived from the well-preserved Grenville Province and represents one of the most detailed records of the orogeny. This classification considers the classical Grenville designation to cover two separate orogenic cycles; the Rigolet, Ottawan and Shawinigan orogenies compose the Grenville Cycle, and the Elzevirian orogeny stands on its own. Due to the great size of the area affected by Grenville events, there is some variance in timing across the orogenic belt.

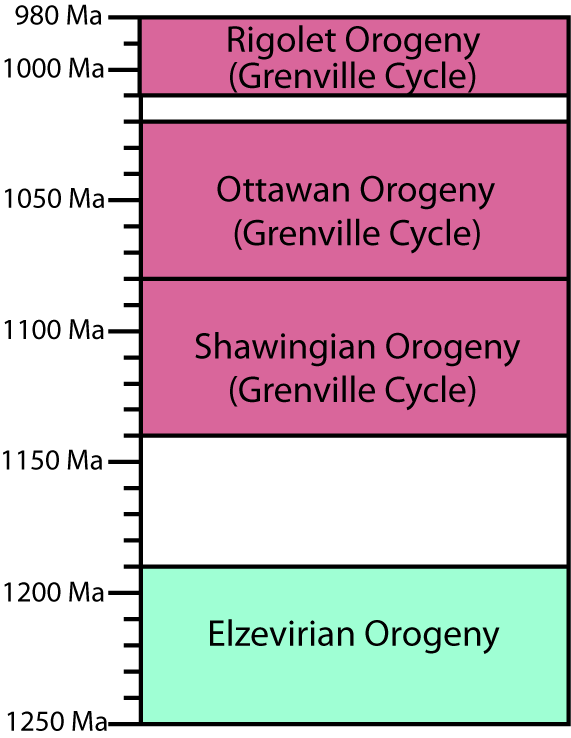
Timeline of the Grenville orogeny, after Rivers (2002)

Ages are approximated from the magmatic activity associated with the individual cycles of the orogeny. The gaps in the ages of the compression cycles and isotope analysis of hornblende, biotite, and potassium feldspar suggest that extension was occurring when compression had momentarily ceased.

Rivers' 2008 paper examines the timing of the different periods of the orogeny and reconstructs the timeline based on the spatial and temporal metamorphism of the rocks present. According to this newer version of the timeline which is a composite of Rivers 1997 and Gower and Krogh 2002, the Elzevirian orogeny occurs from 1240 to 1220 Ma, the Shawinigan occurs from 1190 to 1140 Ma and is no longer part of the Grenville cycle, the Ottawan (1090–1020 Ma) and Rigolet (1010–980 Ma) become phases which are grouped into the Grenvillian orogeny.

== General tectonics ==
Reconstruction of the events of the orogeny is ongoing, but the generally accepted view is that the eastern and southern margins of Laurentia were active convergent margins until the beginning of continental collision. This type of subduction (B-type) tends to emplace magmatic arcs on or near the edge of the overriding plate in modern subduction zones, and evidence of contemporary (c. 1300–1200 Ma) island arcs can be found throughout the Grenville orogen. The Andes of South America are considered a modern analogue. From about c. 1190–980 Ma (the actual timing varies by locality) two separate continental blocks collided with Laurentia. Both of these collision events are thought to be analogous to the collision driving modern-day growth of the Himalaya range. For some time one of the blocks was believed to be the continent of Amazonia, but paleomagnetic evidence has now proven that this is not the case.

These periods of thrusting and metamorphism were not continuous but were interrupted by comparatively quiet periods, during which AMCG (anorthosite / mangerite / charnockite / granite) plutons were intruded into the country rock. Polarities of subduction (which plate overrode which) vary by region and time. Some island arc remnants were emplaced on the Laurentian margin, and some were accreted during orogeny. Timing of these events is constrained by cross-cutting relations observed in the field as well as SHRIMP (sensitive high-resolution ion microprobe) and TIMS (thermal ionization mass spectrometry) uranium-lead dating.

The first period of tectonic activity was the accretion of an island arc at some point during the Elzevirian Orogeny. Before the accretion of the island arc took place, subduction between a continental plate and presumably an oceanic plate was taking place. Slab pull and far-field drivers such as ridge push were aiding in closing the distance between the island arc and the continent. Depending on the angle of subduction, deformation of the continental crust was already taking place and thickening the lithosphere. By 1.19 Ga the Elzevir back arc basin was closing.

From 1.18 to 1.14 Ga extension was occurring in the area. Whether from lithospheric cooling, also known as thermal subsidence, or the compressional activity in the area reactivated some extensional faults. The extension is marked by the isotopic ages of the previously mentioned rocks. Additionally there is the formation of sedimentary basins which means the margin was quiescent enough that sediments could accumulate. However, in some areas from 1.16 to 1.13 Ga, coeval with extension, there is evidence there was still thrusting and emplacement of terranes occurring.

According to one model, westward thrusting occurred from 1.12 to 1.09 Ga and then extension was the primary tectonic activity until 1.05 Ga. It was at this point that the Central Granulite Terrane was exhumed and minor magmatism occurred. The reason for change from compression to extension is unknown but may be the result of gravitational collapse, mantle delamination, the formation of a plume underneath a supercontinent, changes in far-field drivers on the distribution of stress, or any combination of reasons originating from the fact that our planet is dynamic. The cyclic compression and extension history of this area is similar to the Wilson Cycle. In this area of the world the Wilson Cycle would be creating the basin for the Iapetus Ocean.

== General lithology ==
Today, the Grenville orogen is marked by northwest verging fold-and-thrust belts and high pressure metamorphic regimes, as well as distinctive AMCG suite magmatism. Metamorphism is commonly of amphibolite and granulite facies, that is, medium to high temperature and pressure alteration. Eclogitized metagabbros (very high pressure ultramafic metamorphic rocks) are found in some localities and likely represent areas of deepest burial and/or most intense collision. Throughout the orogen, these sequences of high pressure metamorphic rocks are cut by intrusive AMCG suite plutons, generally interpreted as syn- or post-tectonic. AMCG plutonism is generally associated with asthenospheric upwelling under thinned lithosphere. This is derived from the theory that AMCG plutonism is driven by ponding of olivine tholeiite basalt at the base of the continental crust during tectonic extension. The lithosphere may be thinned either convectively or by delamination, in which the bottom portion of the lithosphere is stripped off. Both models have been proposed for the Grenville orogeny.

The Grenville orogeny can be categorized into three sections based on structure, lithology, and thermochronology. The three sections, respectively called the Gneiss Belt, Metasedimentary Belt, and the Granulite terrane are all separated by shear zones. The Gneiss Belt is made up of felsic gneisses and amphibolites that were metamorphosed in the upper amphibolite to granulite facies. Thrusting in this section was low angle but would have the potential to increase and rotate as it continued and evolved. Shear in this area is referred to as ductile shear meaning the material was cooling and becoming solid, but still behaving viscously or plasticly. The age of this belt is approximately 1.8 to 1.18 Ga. Regional metamorphism is believed to have deformed this area at approximately 1.4 Ga and metamorphic thrusting at approximately 1.16 to 1.12 Ga.

The Metasedimentary Belt is predominantly sedimentary and volcanic rocks which have undergone greenschist to granulite facies metamorphism. Subdivisions of this belt include the Bancroft, Elzevir, Sharbot Lake, and Frontenac Domains and the Adirondack Lowlands. In this belt magmatism is known to have occurred between 1.42 and 1.04 Ga depending on location. As with the Gneiss Belt, metamorphism is believed to have occurred at approximately 1.16 Ga. The Granulite Terrane is composed of meta-igneous gneisses including anorthosite massifs. Anorthosites form in plutons and are composed mostly of plagioclase. The rocks of the Grenville Province in Canada are included in this category. The oldest magmatism known in this area dates to 1.32 Ga approximately. Granulite facies metamorphism began around 1.15 Ga and continued for about 150 Ma after the onset, however the continuity of the metamorphism cannot be determined.

== Regional variations ==
It is important to separate local from large-scale tectonic history of the orogenic belt in order to understand the orogeny. For this purpose, the Grenville orogen is generally broken into four localities: the southern extent in Texas and Mexico, the Appalachians, the Adirondacks, and the Grenville Province. A portion of the orogen can be found in Scotland, but because of Scotland's proximity to the Grenville Province prior to opening of the Iapetus Ocean, the two share largely the same history.

=== Texas and Mexico ===
Texas and Mexico represent the southern margin of Laurentia and likely collided with a different continent than that involved in the eastern collision. The Zapotecan orogeny of Mexico is coeval with the later stages of the Grenville orogeny, and they are generally considered to be one and the same. Mesoproterozoic igneous protoliths (metamorphosed to granulite facies during the orogeny) fall into two age groups in Mexico; c. 1235–1115 Ma and c. 1035–1010 Ma. Rocks of the former group bear geochemical signatures implying island arc and back-arc basin provenance. The latter group represents AMCG magmatism. These AMCG rocks are somewhat anomalous throughout the Grenville orogen, there is no known orogenic event which immediately predates their emplacement.

It is suggested that the regime of subduction under the Laurentian margin (currently in Texas, north of the accreted Mexican terrane) ended around 1230 Ma, and that subduction polarity reversed to bring the colliding continent north, since the Llano Uplift, which records the history of the Grenville in Texas, bears no evidence of arc magmatism after this time.

=== Appalachians ===
The Appalachian Mountains contain small, isolated exposures of the Grenville orogen. The largest of these, the Long Range Inlier, comprises the Long Range Mountains of Newfoundland. Other exposures include the Shenandoah and French Broad massifs, which comprise the Blue Ridge province of Virginia. Blue Ridge rocks consist of various gneisses of upper amphibolite and granulite facies, intruded by charnockite and granitoid rocks. These igneous rocks were intruded in three intervals: c. 1160–1140 Ma, c. 1112 Ma, and c. 1080–1050 Ma, and are massive to weakly foliated in texture.

=== Adirondacks ===
This region consists of a massive dome of Proterozoic rock on the New York-Canada border. Both the Elzevirian (c. 1250–1190 Ma) and Ottawan (c. 1080–1020 Ma) orogenic pulses are recorded in the Adirondacks, producing high-grade metamorphic rock. A northwest-trending high-strain shear zone separates the dome into the highlands to the southeast and the lowlands to the northwest. It is believed that the shear zone (the Carthage-Colton) was a transpressional boundary during the Ottawan, when the highlands were thrust over the lowlands.

=== Grenville province ===
The Grenville province is named for Grenville, Quebec, and constitutes the youngest portion of the Canadian Shield. Since the area has not undergone any regional metamorphic overprinting since the orogeny, it is considered an ideal study area for Grenville and pre-Grenville age tectonics. Hence, most of what is known about the orogeny and its processes is derived from the Grenville Province. The Laurentian Mountains are a part of the province.

== See also ==
- Supercontinent cycle
