= Bancroft Rockhound Gemboree =

Annual rock-collecting event in Ontario, Canada

- 2013 Gemboree
- Frequency: annually
- Venue: North Hastings Community Centre
- Location: Bancroft, Ontario
- Inaugurated: 1963
- Organiser: Town of Bancroft
- Website: https://www.bancroftrockhoundgemboree.ca/

The Bancroft Rockhound Gemboree is a four-day event in Bancroft, Ontario, Canada, where mineral collectors and vendors meet to trade rocks and minerals. It has been occurring annually since 1963.

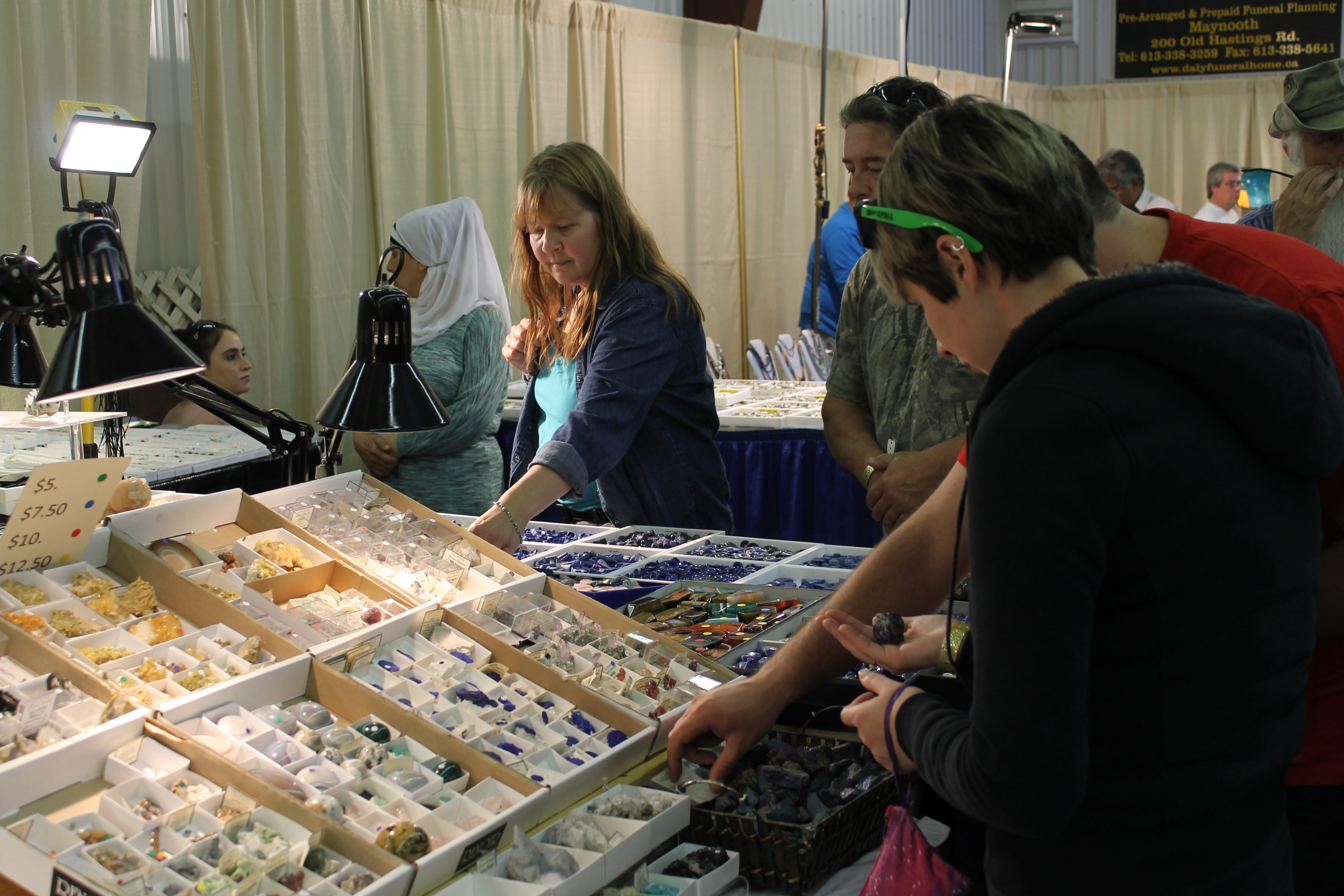
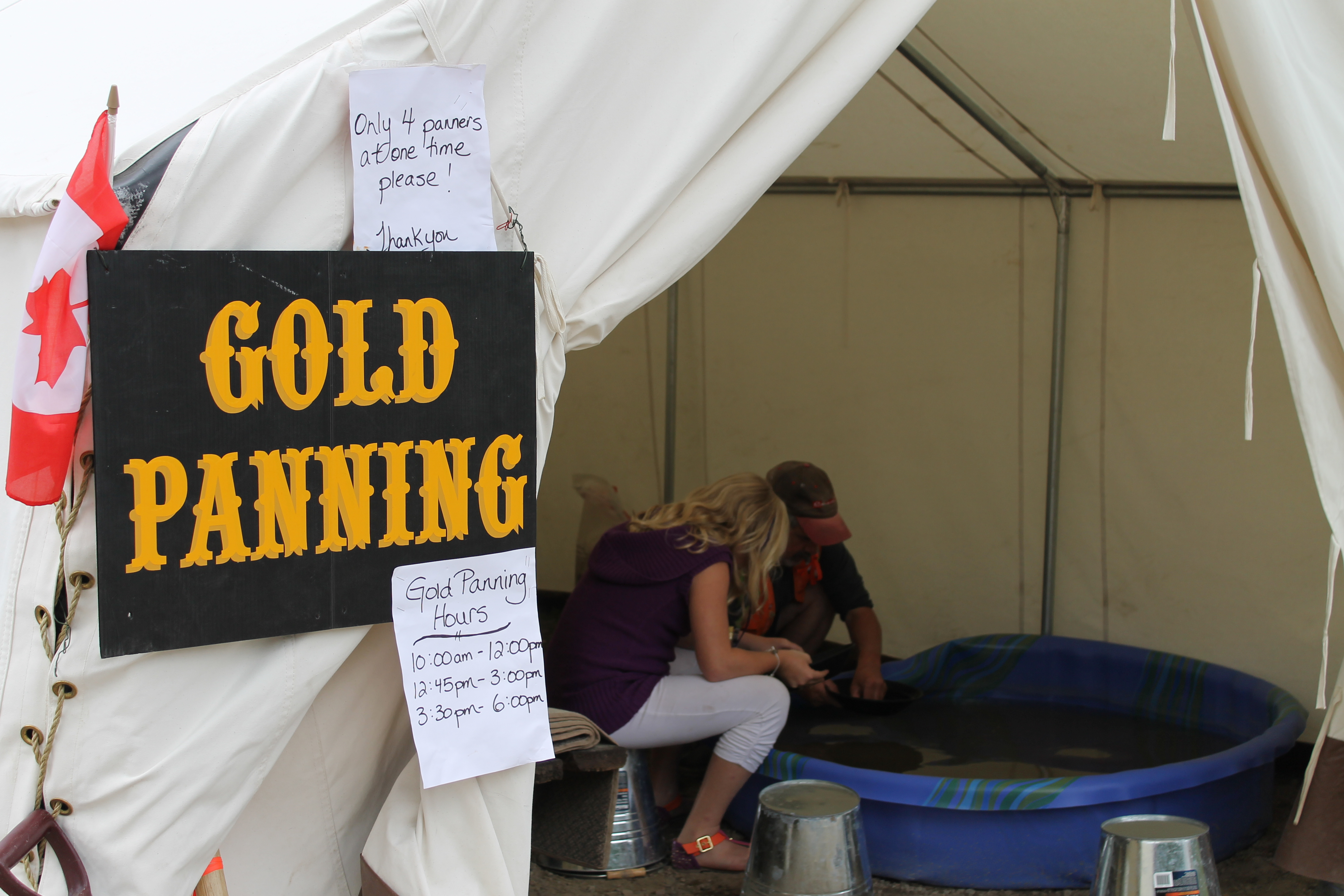

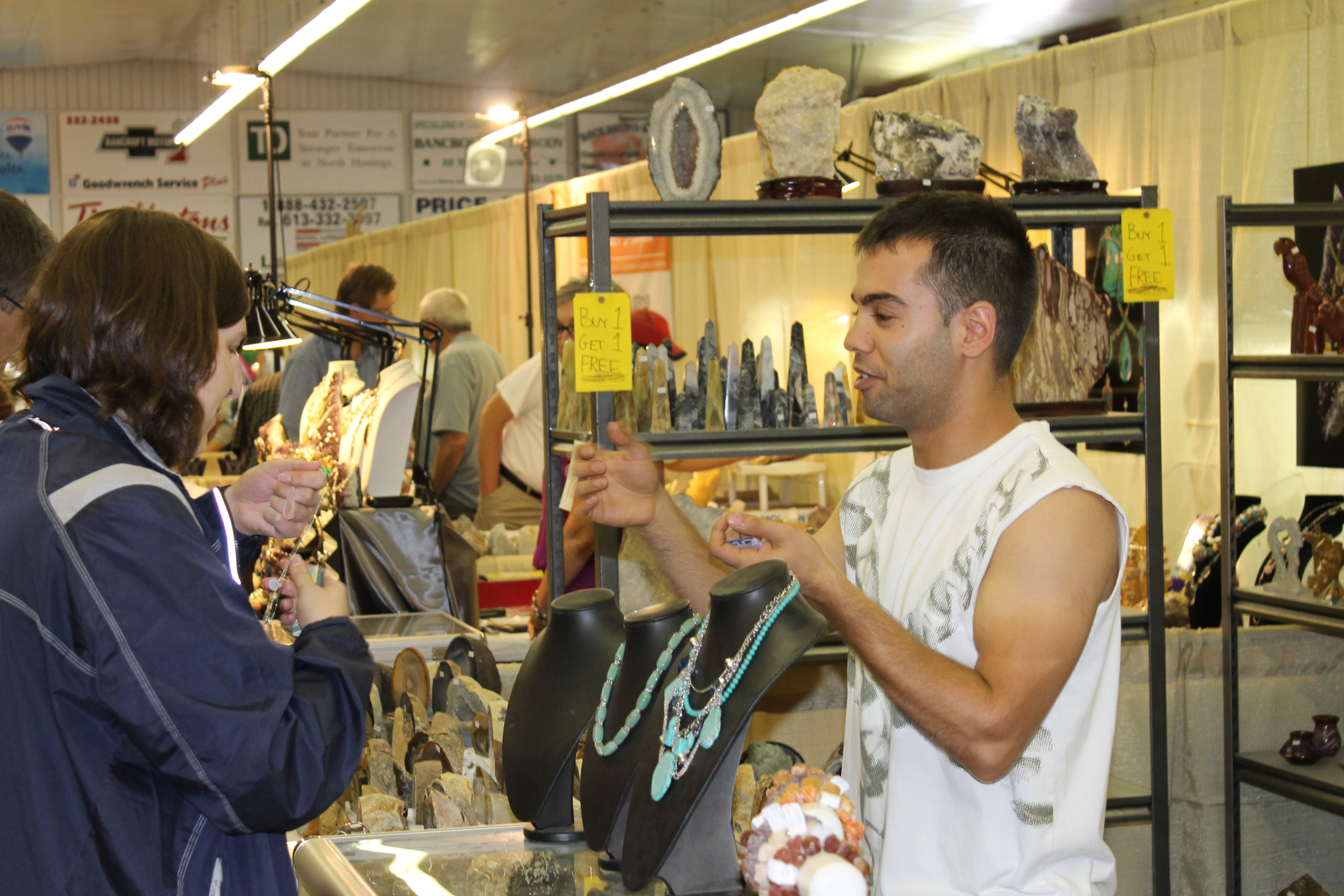
2013 Gemboree

== Geology of Bancroft ==
The geology around Bancroft is rich in mineral pegmatites, as a result of molten lava being trapped under the Canadian Shield one billion areas ago. The geology of Bancroft is noted for having bodies of quartz surrounded by rare earth minerals, including zircon and uraninite.

== History ==
The Gemboree was started on 1963 by two dozen people based out of a tent and a room at the local Royal Canadian Legion. The 22nd Gemboree occurred in 1985 and attracted 8,000 attendees.

By 1991, the event was being held at the Bancroft's North Hastings Community Centre and The Globe and Mail reported that it was described as "the largest show of its kind in Canada." The 1995 Gemboree attracted mineral vendors from across Canada, the US and South Africa. By 2004, the four-day event had moved into the local hockey arena.

In 2020 the Town of Bancroft took over responsbility for the event from the local chamber of commerce.

== See also ==
- List of mines in the Bancroft area
