= Betafite =

Mineral group

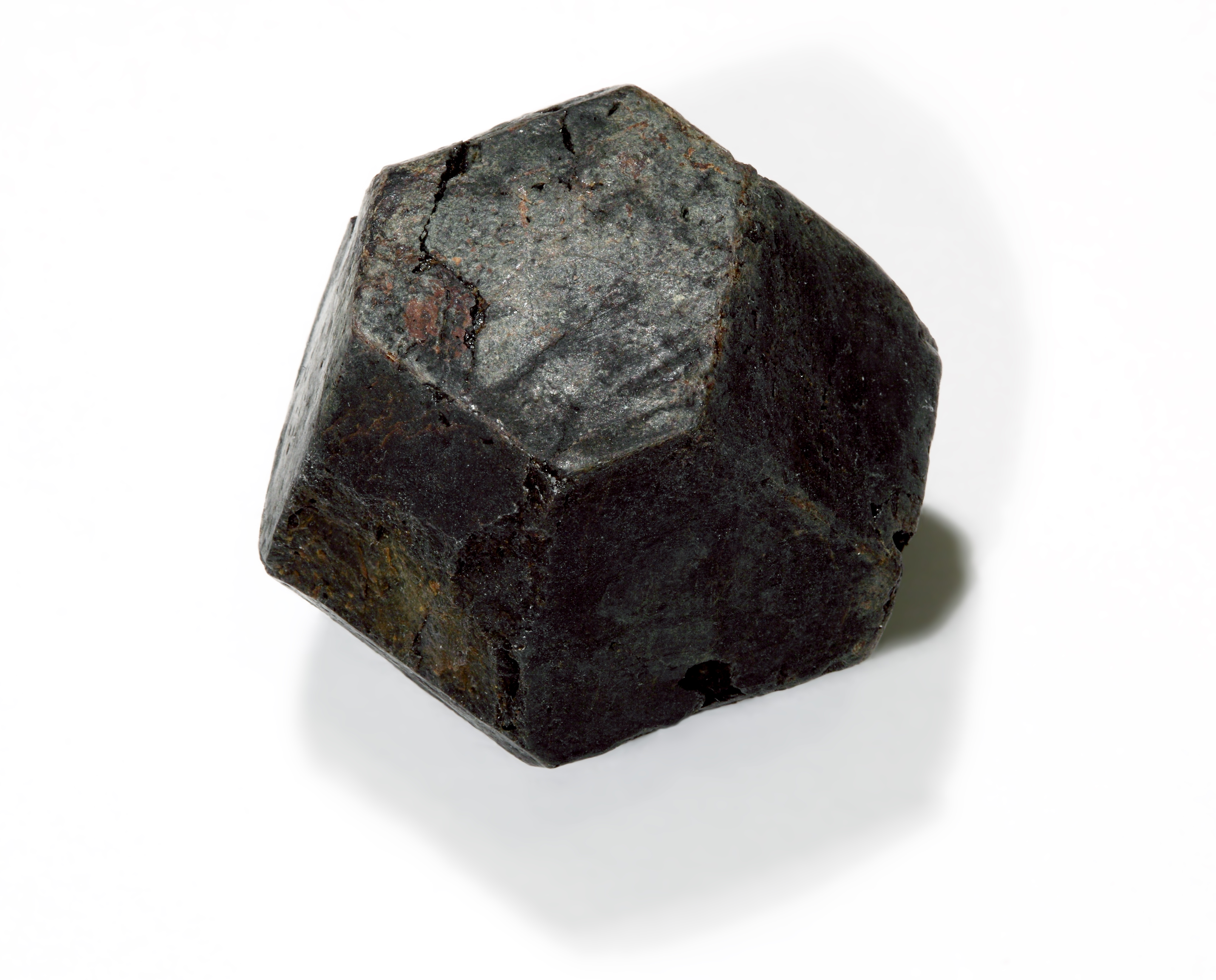
- Betafite dodecahedron, Locality: Bancroft, Ontario, Canada

General
- Category: Oxide minerals
- Formula: (Ca,U)_{2}(Ti,Nb,Ta)_{2}O_{6}(OH)
- IMA symbol: Btf
- Strunz classification: 4.DH.15
- Crystal system: Cubic
- Space group: Fd3̅m (no. 227)

Identification
- Color: Brown, Black, Brownish green, Yellow, Greenish black
- Crystal habit: Massive - Granular
- Cleavage: None
- Mohs scale hardness: 5 - 5.5
- Luster: Vitreous
- Streak: Yellowish white
- Diaphaneity: Translucent to Opaque
- Density: 3.7 - 4.9
- Other characteristics: Radioactive 17.2% (U)

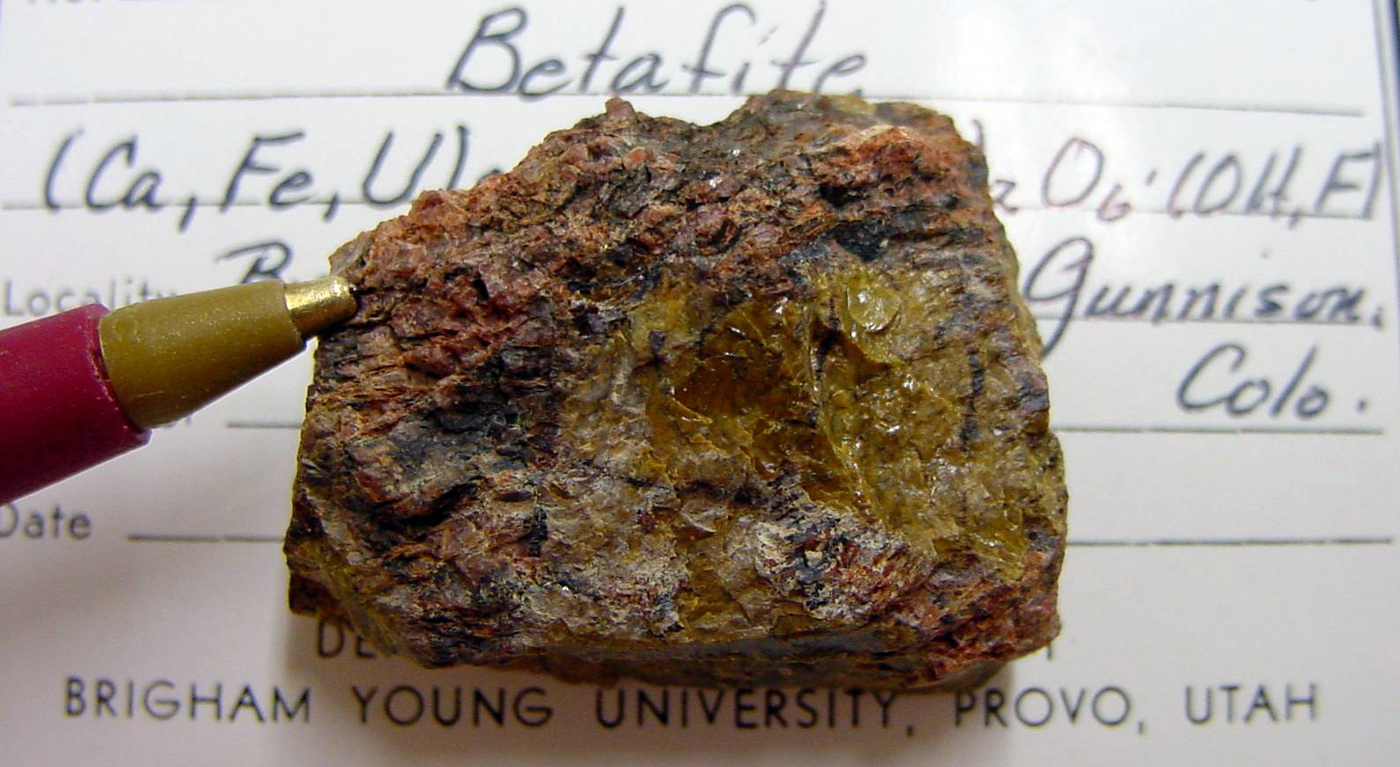
Betafite, Gunnison, Colorado

Betafite is a mineral group in the pyrochlore supergroup, with the chemical formula (Ca,U)_{2}(Ti,Nb,Ta)_{2}O_{6}(OH). Betafite typically occurs as a primary mineral in granite pegmatites, rarely in carbonatites. Originally defined by the B-site atom Ti, the development of new nomenclature for mineral names led to modernization of the system for nomenclature of pyrochlore and betafite in order to further rationalize the naming process of this grouping of minerals. Only two of the mineral species that were formerly recognized as betafite are presently retained. They are oxyuranobetafite and oxycalciobetafite. The term betafite is now a synonym or varietal group name under the pyrochlore super group.

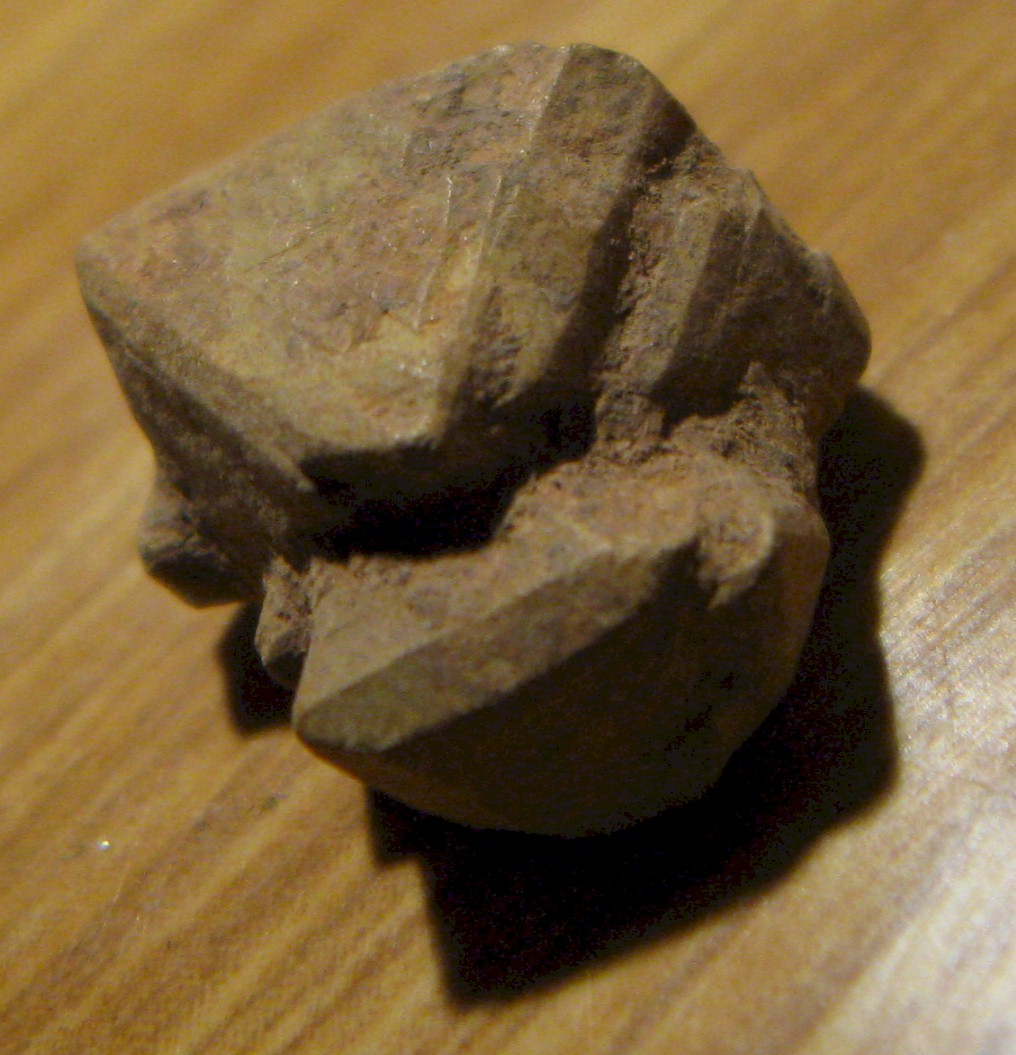
Betafite from Madagascar

== Structure ==
The pyrochlore supergroup minerals conform to the general formula, A_{2−m}B_{2}X_{6−w}Y_{1−n}, where the m, w, and n variables represent the parameters that indicate incomplete occupancy of the A, Y, and X sites. They crystallize isometric system with a space group of Fd3̅m or its subgroups where Betafite has a hexoctahedral class. Site A is generally an 8-coordinated cation with a ~1.0 Å radius, B site is generally a 6-coordinated cation, which contains the elements Ti, Nb, and Ta usually for betafite, site X is generally O but can subjugate to OH and F, and site Y is typically an anion but can also be a vacancy, H_{2}O, or a very large monovalent cation, like Cs, K, and Rb.

== Origin and uses ==
Oxycalciobetafite occurs in the pyroclastic formation belonging to the main effusive stage of the Vico activity where it is contained within foid-bearing syenite, which also holds optical observances of K-feldspar, and minor amphibole, plagioclase, magnetite, sodalite and rare biotite. While with SEM-EDS, titanite, apatite, and baddeleyite were also observed. While the occurrence of oxycalciobetafite on the moon has been rather difficult to ascertain, occurrences of oxyuranobetafite have been described.

Though there is no use as of yet for the accepted betafite species, the pyrochlore super-group that contains the former betafites are potential sources of uranium, thorium, and niobium. The depletion of uraninite rich ore bodies has led to the search and mild application of refractory uranium minerals as a source of uranium to keep up with the increasing demands.
