= Grenville Province =

Geologic region in Eastern Canada

The Grenville Province is a tectonically complex region, in Eastern Canada, that contains many different aged accreted terranes from various origins. It exists southeast of the Grenville Front and extends from Labrador southwestern to Lake Huron. It is bounded by the St. Lawrence River/Seaway to the southeast.

The Grenville Front separates the Grenville Province from the Superior Craton. Adjacent to the Grenville Front is the Parautochthonous Belt. The Parautochthonous Belt is made of rocks originally derived from the Superior Craton, which have been metamorphosed and reworked since their emplacement. The rocks to the southwest of the Parautochthonous Belt are various accreted terranes that have been thrust upon or emplaced during the various tectonic events that have taken place from 2.0 to 0.98 billion years ago. The compositions of these terranes are unique and have distinct depleted mantle model ages.

During the formation of the Grenville Province, the type of tectonism changed. The earliest stages of formation were dominated by arrested subduction. The type of tectonism then changed to flat slab subduction. In the late stages of formation the tectonism changed to collisional orogenesis. Although there have been many studies done on the Grenville Province, the origins of the various terranes are still not fully understood and may never be fully known.

== Subdivisions of the Grenville Province ==
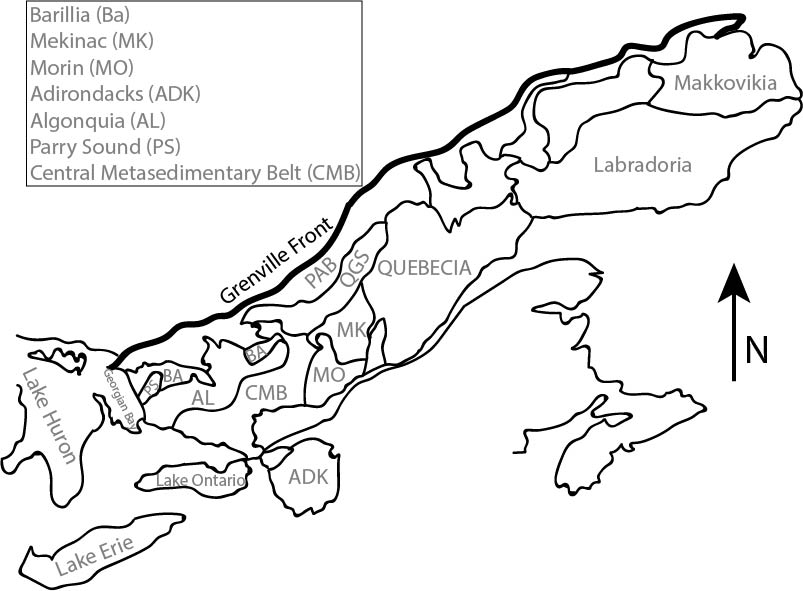
The subdivisions of the Grenville Province. PAB refers to the parautochthonous belt.

=== Central Metasedimentary Belt ===
The Central Metasedimentary Boundary Thrust Zone makes up the northwestern boundary of the Central Metasedimentary Belt. the southern tip is near Kingston, Canada, and surrounds Ottawa, Canada It was created during the Shawinigan Orogeny (1.19-1.14 Ga). The Central Metasedimentary Belt is bordered to the south by Phanerozoic sedimentary rocks and Lake Ontario.

In the northeastern central Metasedimentary Belt, the rocks are composed of Orthogneiss. The region is known as the Bondy and LaCoste domical complexes. In the southwestern Metasedimentary Belt, the rocks are tonalitic to granitic orthogneisses.

Nd model ages of the Central Metasedimentary Belt range from 1.55 to 1.4 Ga. The origin of this area can be attributed to rifting (which made the accommodation for the sediments) and subsequent thrusting from the collision with Amazonia.

=== Barillia ===
Barillia is located northeast of Lake Huron. It is bound by the allochthon boundary thrust and Algonquia to the south, and Laurentia to the north. It is an accreted arc that was accreted during the Penokean orogeny. Barillia's composition is calc-alkaline granitic gneiss. Nd model ages of Barillia are around 1.90 Ga.

=== Makkovikia ===
Makkovikia is located in eastern Labrador. It was created during the Makkovik orogeny. An Andean-type arc developed and was accreted onto the preexisting continental rocks. Makkovikia's composition is rather complicated. The Kaipokok domain has both Archean crust and Paleoproterozoic volcanics and sedimentary rocks. Within the Aillik and Cape Harrison domains, there are plutonic rocks. Nd model ages of Makkovikia are around 1.90 Ga.

=== Labradoria ===
Labradoria is located in northeastern Québec. Labradoria is part of an Andean style arc that accreted around 1.67-1.66 Ga. It was later intruded by continental arc plutons during Pinwarian orogeny. It is composied of calc-alkaline batholiths. Nd model ages of Labradoria are around 1.70. Ga.

=== Quebecia ===
Quebecia is located in central Québec near Baie-Comeau and Forestville. It is bordered to the south by the St. Lawrence River. Quebecia is an accreted arc and is calk-alkaline in composition. Nd model ages of Quebecia are around 1.55 Ga.

=== Mekinac ===
Mekinac is located northeast of Montreal, Canada. It was created with Andean-style magmatism. The origin is not fully understood, but is thought to be related to the origin of the Adirondacks. This makes it related to the Shawinigan orogeny. Its composition is tonalitic gneiss. Nd model ages of Mekinac are around 1.4-1.5 Ga.

=== Morin ===
Morin is located near Montreal, Canada. It was a terrane that was thrust up during the Shawinigan orogeny around 1.19-1.16 Ga. Its composition is Anorthosite-mangerite-charnockite-granite. Nd model ages of Morin are around 1.3-1.5 Ga.

=== Adirondacks ===
The Adirondacks are located in northeastern New York, United States. The Adirondacks were accreted during the Shawinigan orogeny. This is evidenced by the deformation in the allochthonous monocyclic belt. The Highlands and Lowlands of the Adirondacks were separated before the Shawinigan orogeny. This is evidenced by differing compositions of plutonic rocks. Only the Highlands experienced Ottawan high-temperature metamorphism while the Lowlands displaced along Carthage-Colton shear zone and ended up next to Highlands.

The composition of the Southern Adirondacks consists of orthoquartzite. In the Adirondack Lowlands there are ophiolites and calc-alkaline granitoids. In the Adirondack Highlands orthogneisses are present with metapelitic migmatites.

The Adirondacks as a whole do not contain Archean zircons and therefore rocks are not sourced from Laurentia. It has a Nd model age ranging from 1.3 to 1.5 Ga.

=== Algonquia ===
Algonquia is located east of the Georgian Bay in Ontario, Canada. It was an allochthon that was thrust up onto existing continental rock. The plutonic ages do not match surrounding rocks, which gives evidence of it being an exotic terrane. Algonquia's composition is orthogneiss, diorite, and quartz-dioritic orthogneiss. Its Nd model age is between 1.6 and 1.9 Ga.

=== Parry Sound ===
Parry Sound is located east of the Georgian Bay in Ontario, Canada. Parry Sound is a nappe that was thrust up on existing continental rock. This is proven by the similarities of the compositions to the Central Metasedimentary Belt and the Adirondack Highlands. The quartzite is evidence that the three terranes were all continuous at one point due to the zircons contained within it matching the Central Metasedimentary Belt and the Adirondack Highlands. Parry Sound is composed of migmatitic quartzite, gneiss, anorthosite, and gabbro. Its Nd model age is around 1.4-1.6 Ga.

== Overall tectonic history ==
The ductile lower crust of the nappes allowed for the terranes to be accreted on the continental margin via a lower crustal indenter. Later events such as late-stage thrusting and extension can be attributed to gravitational spreading.

=== Collision Zone Changes ===
In the Paleoproterozoic, the Grenville Province was controlled by arrested subduction. During the beginning stages of the Mesoproterozoic (1.60-1.23 Ga) the Grenville Province was controlled by flat slab subduction. By the later stages of the Mesoproterozoic (1.23-0.90 Ga), the Grenville Province was controlled by pressure-point orogenesis.

==== Arrested Subduction ====
===== Penokean (1.86-1.83 Ga) =====
The Algonquian terrane was accreted during this orogeny.

===== Pre-Labradorian (>1.71 Ga) =====
Juvenile crust was developed without interaction of the older crustal material. Terranes accreted during this time are related to the Makkovikian and Penokean orogenies.

===== Labradorian (1.71-1.66 Ga) =====
A calc-alkaline arc was accreted on preexisting Laurentia.

===== Collisional Orogenesis (~1.66 Ga) =====
Metamorphism of the arc and preexisting Laurentia took place creating mylonite zones.

===== Trans-Labradorian Magmatism (1.65-1.62 Ga) =====
Crustal thickening represented by the accreted arc on preexisting Laurentia caused magmatism.

===== Late Labradorian (1.62-1.60 Ga) =====
A passive margin that accumulated sediment formed due to lack of tectonic activity.

==== Flat Slab Subduction ====
The subduction zone central location changes from south to north during this time.

===== Post-Labradorian and pre-Pinwarian (1.60-1.52 Ga) =====
There is a continuation of the passive margin during this time.

===== Pinwarian (1.52-1.46 Ga) =====
Felsic magmatism dominates this time period. The cause of the magmatism is debated between an extensional setting or a continental-margin arc. The name is in relation to the ensuing orogeny and metamorphism.

===== Early to mid-Elsonian (1.46-1.29 Ga) =====
Pinwarian magmatism has stopped by this time. Gabbros were formed in the northern Grenville Province around 1.46-1.43 Ga, named the Michael-Shabogamo gabbros. From 1.42 to 1.35 Ga, there is no magmatic activity. After this period and until the end of the mid-Elsonian, the Nain Plutonic Suite is emplaced in Labrador.

===== Late Elsonian (1.29-1.23 Ga) =====
Felsic magmatism dominates the north and south areas of Labrador while mafic magmatism dominates the central area of Labrador.

==== Collisional Orogenesis ====
===== Elzevirian Orogenesis (1.23-1.18 Ga) =====
Felsic magmatism ceases and accretion of island arcs occurs in the Central Metasedimentary Belt.

===== Post-Elzevirian and Pre-Grenvillian (1.18-1.08 Ga) =====
Mixed compression and extension caused broad mafic magmatism during this time. This could be related to the Shawinigan orogeny which occurred in the southwestern region of the Grenville Province.

===== Grenvillian (1.08-0.98 Ga) =====
During this time, deformation and metamorphism was widely spread throughout the entire Grenville Province but the level of intensity varied. The exterior section of the province was subject to more deformation and metamorphism, while the interior was subject to more magmatism. The magmatism was exclusively in preexisting crust.
