= EWL Management Limited =

Defunct Canadian mine holding company

EWL Management Ltd
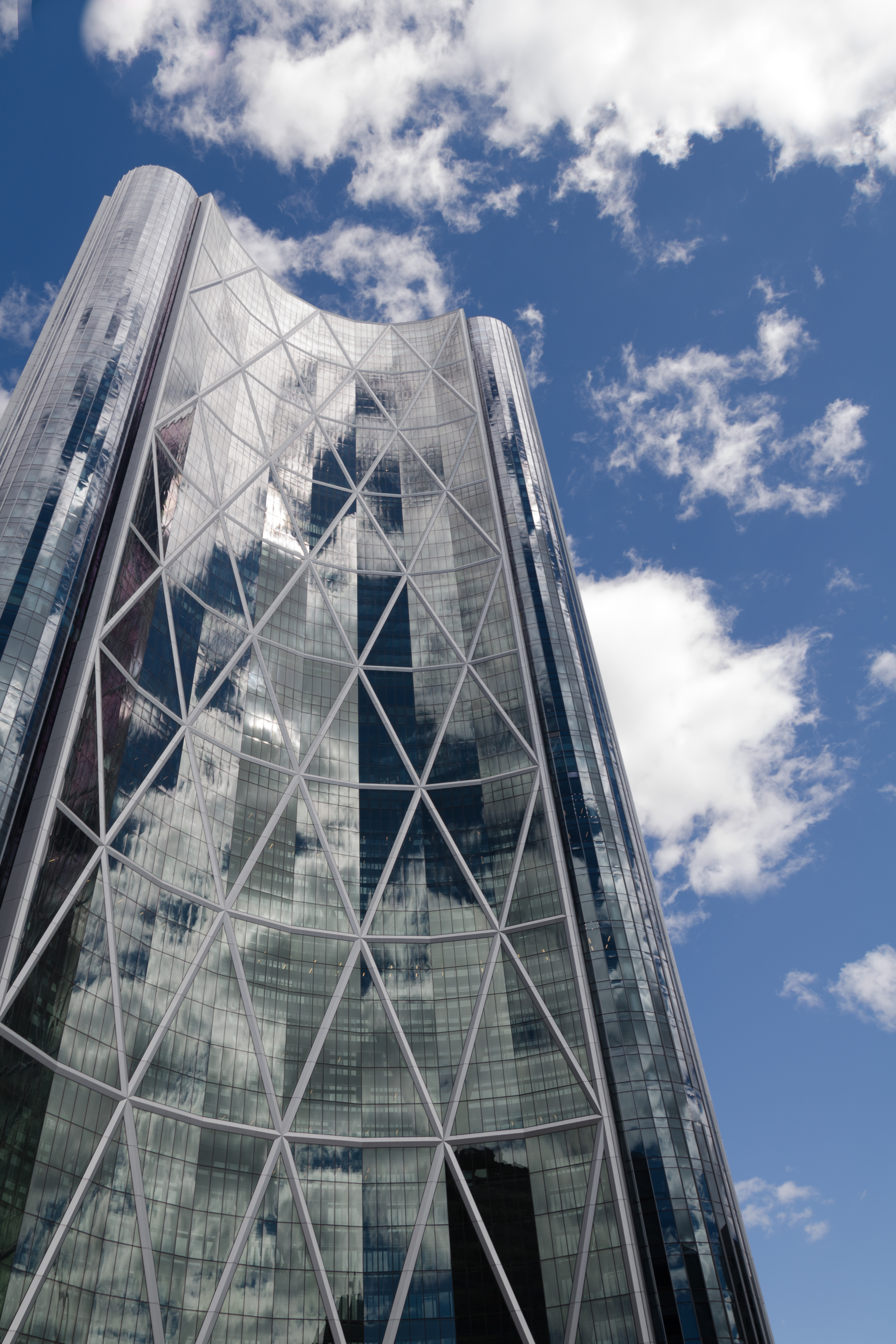
- 500 Centre Street SE, Alberta
- Formerly: Conwest Exploration; Alberta Energy Company; AEC West; Encana
- Industry: Mining
- Predecessor: 2013568239 Alberta Ltd
- Founded: October 17, 2007
- Defunct: February 22, 2022
- Headquarters: 500 Centre Street SE, Calgary
- Number of locations: 5
- Key people: Dave Lye, President (as of 2014)
- Total assets: Madawaska Mine; Dyno Mine; Greyhawk Mine; Coldstream Copper Mine; Gordon Lake Mine
- Parent: Ovintiv
- Website: ewlimited.com

The successor of multiple historical Canadian mining and energy companies, EWL Management Limited was an Alberta based corporation that owned five decommissioned mines in Ontario, including three former uranium mines.

The company was one of seven companies in Canada which managed decommissioned uranium mines and, as of 2016, held 2% of all uranium tailings in Canada.

The company was a subsidiary of Ovintiv, and dissolved into Ovintiv in February 2022.

== Corporate history ==
In 1996, Conwest Exploration Company Limited was acquired by Alberta Energy Company, which became AEC West. AEC became Encana with legacy mines being moved into the holding of subsidiary EWL Management.

The company was registered on October 17, 2007, in Alberta, originally as 356823 Alberta Ltd, changing its name to EWL Management Limited in 2009.

Encanada, and EWL, became part of Ovintiv in 2019, and is now known as Ovintiv Canada ULC.

== Assets ==
EWL Management Limited owned five decommissioned mines in Ontario:

- Madawaska Uranium Mine, Bancroft,
- Dyno Uranium Mine, Bancroft,
- Greyhawk Uranium Mine, Bancroft,
- Coldstream Copper Mine, Burchell Lake Area, Thunder Bay, and
- Gordon Lake Mine, near Werner Lake in the Kenora District.

The company managed 4,600,000 tonnes of uranium tailings at former mines, which in 2016 represented 2% of all uranium tailings in Canada.

== Operations ==
Since two of EWL's mines contaminated local groundwater, EWL were rehabilitating mines to meet provincial water safety standards. This included rehabilitating two tailing management areas at Madawaska Mine. The rehabilitation was managed by Golder Associates with the aim to make the site compliant with Canada's Nuclear Safety and Control Act and Ontario's Mining Act.

== Dissolution ==
EWL dissolved into Ovintiv in on February 22, 2022. The Canadian Nuclear Safety Commission obliged Ovintiv to meet the licensing requirements of the two licenses WNSL-W5-3101.1/2034 and WNSL-W5-3100.0/2036.

== See also ==
- Mining in Canada
- Uranium mining in the Bancroft area
