= Coldstream copper mine =

Decommissioned mine in Ontario, Canada

Coldstream Copper Mine
- Location near Kashabowie, Ontario

Location
- Location: Burchell Lake, Ontario, Canada; 48°36′11″N 90°35′31″W

Production
- Products: Copper, Silver, Gold

History
- Opened: 1957
- Active: 1960-1967
- Closed: 1967

Owner
- Company: Ovintiv

Coldstream Copper Mine, sometimes called the North Coldstream Copper Mine, the Coldstream Mine, or the North Coldstream Mine is a decommissioned former copper, silver and gold mine adjacent to Burchell Lake. It is located 11km south of Kashabowie, in Northern Ontario, Canada.

The mine produced $28 million worth of metals, mostly copper but also silver and gold.

Production started in 1957 and ceased in 1967, leaving 2.2 million tons of tailings on site, 500,000 tons deposited in Halet Lake.

== Location ==
The mine is located at the end of a small road off of Ontario Highway 802 11 kilometres south of Kashabowie, in Northern Ontario, Canada. Adjacent to the mine is the ghost town of Burchell Lake.

As of 1961, the site included 81 mineral claims including those that were previously held by the former Tip Top Mine.

== Mining history ==
Copper was first discovered in 1870, and 6,000 tonnes of ore were extracted during World War One. Between 1951 and 1957 Coldstream Copper Mines Limited undertook exploration of the site, starting production in 1957. The 1,000-tons-per-day concentrator was built in 1959. By 1961, four shafts had been sunk, three vertically and one at 80° at depths of 20, 50, 200, and 1,596 feet. Production paused in 1958.

Between 1960 and 1967, the mine produced 2.5 million tons of ore that was 1.97% copper and which produced silver at 0.22 ounces per ton and gold at 0.012 ounces per ton. In 1961, the mine employed 92 staff underground, and 102 staff on the surface. The mine was managed by L. R. Redford who organized the construction of Burchell Lake township to accommodate the staff. The housing included 11 log homes for management, plus 24 bungalows and 17 mobile homes for staff. The town, which accommodated 400 residents in its peak, also had four bunkhouses, a gas station, an ice rink, a general store, a pump house, and a two-room school.

The mine closed in 1967, leaving 2.7 million tonnes of sulphide tailings on site in two locations. In the years it was operation, the mine produced $28 million worth of copper, silver and gold. Activities restarted in 1990, but did not find underground resources worth extracting.

Goldshore Resources company undertook drilling at the mine site in 2022, finding copper, cobalt and gold at a depths around 63 metres.

== Ownership ==
Coldsteam Copper Mines Limited became incorporated in November 1951, in August 1959 the company changed its name to North Coldsteam Mines Limited. Their registered office was 44 King Street West, Toronto. At that time the president was W. S. Row, the board secretary and treasurer was R. D. Stewart. the assistant secretary and treasurer was B. C. Bone, other directors were E. T. Donaldson, L. J. Moreaux, R. V. Porritt, H. L. Roscoe, N. C. Urquhart, and R. D. Stewart.

In 1968, the mining rights were sold to Nelson Machinery. In 1971, North Coldstream Mines changed its name to Coldstream Mines, before going into receivership in 1976. In 1977, International Mogul bought the mining rights from Nelson Machinery, which transferred to Conwest due to corporate mergers. Nelson Machinery went into receivership in 1991.

Between 1992 and 1995, the Ontario Ministry of Energy, Northern Development and Mines ordered Nelson Machinery and Conwest to submit closure plans. After a court challenge to this, the Office of the Mining & Lands Commissioner ruled that Nelson Machinery was responsible for the rehabilitation of the buildings and Conwest was responsible for the tailings and mines.

As the successor of Conwest Exploration Company Limited, AEC West Limited took ownership of the site before it fell under the management of Ovintiv subsidiary EWL Management Limited. EWL dissolved into Ovintiv in February 2022.

== Buildings and tailings ==
The mine building and above ground structures were demolished in 2000 by the Ministry of Northern Development and Mines, drawing from their Abandoned Mines Fund.

Initially the tailings were discharged into a natural valley. The valley was filled after the discharge of 2.2 million tons of sulphide tailings, which are now held in place behind a dam, using natural rock and tailings. This area is referred to as "tailings management area one".

After the valley was filled, the Ontario Department of Lands and Forest permitted the mine owners to deposit tailings into Halet Lake. This area is referred to as "tailings management area two". Approximately half a million tons of sulphide tailings were dumped into Halet Lake, covering the bottom of the lake with tailings and creating three hectares of beaches.

Tailings management area two generated acids and metal contamination in Halet Lake, which then flowed downstream into Background Lake and then on to Wawiag River and into Burchell Lake.

Between 1998 and 2000, the 4,000 tons of tailings, representing a majority of what was on the beach, were submerged into Halet Lake in order to reduce oxidisation and associated pollution. After analysis by Golder Associates, a temporary dam was constructed to stop downstream pollution. Because some of the tailings were submerged by less than two meters, their protection from air oxidisation relies on water levels being high, which is reliant on the presence of a beaver dam.

== Environmental legacy ==
In 1999, the Government of Ontario launched a program to rehabilitate former mines, and improved the environment at 37 mines, including Coldstream mine.

In 2015, the Environmental Commissioner of Ontario criticized the provincial government for the lack of financial assurances from the owner of the mine, EWL Management Limited, who were among a group of mine owners that had not put aside funds for environmental clean up fees, leaving the Government of Ontario at risk of covering any remediation costs.

== See also ==
- List of copper mines in Canada
