= NSCA =

NSCA may refer to:

- National Safety Council of Australia
- Nova Scotia Court of Appeal
- Nuclear Safety and Control Act
- National Strength and Conditioning Association
- Negros State College of Agriculture, now known as Central Philippines State University
