= Halet Lake =

Lake in Northern Ontario, Canada

- Location within Ontario
- Location: Thunder Bay District
- Coordinates: 48.606764°N 90.565390°W
- Primary outflows: Wawiag River
- Basin countries: Canada
- Max. length: 0.4 km (0.25 mi)
- Max. width: 0.4 km (0.25 mi)

Halet Lake is the common name for a small lake in Northern Ontario used by the operators of Coldstream copper mine to dump half a million tons of sulphide tailings in the mid 1960s.

== Description ==
Halet Lake is located east of Grassy Lake and northeast of Burchell Lake.

== History ==
Halet Lake became known as "Tailings Management Area 2" of the mine after the Department of Lands and Forest provided permission for the dumping. The dumping occurred on the south west shore of the waterbody between 1962 and 1967, forming a 3-hectare beach of tailings. The tailings produced acid and contaminated downstream bodies of water, including Wawiag River and Burchell Lake.

In 1998, the majority of the tailings were moved to below Halet Lake's water line, and 4,000 tons moved to the other tailings dump area of the Coldsteam copper mine site (Tailings Management Area 1). The move was undertaken to inhibit oxidisation and acid creation.

The water level dropped prior to 2008 exposing the tailings, but covered them after 2008 after a beaver dam raised the water level above the tailings. In 2012, EWL Management Limited built a structure to permanently raise the water levels above the tailings dump.

== See also ==
- List of lakes of Ontario
