= Velshi =

Velshi is an Indian (Khoja) surname. Notable people with the surname include:

- Ali Velshi (born 1969), Canadian journalist and host of MSNBC's Velshi; son of Murad Velshi
- Murad Velshi (born 1935), businessman in Africa and a member of the Legislative Assembly of Ontario; father of Ali Velshi
- Alykhan Velshi (born 1984), Canadian lawyer, policy analyst and ministerial assistant
- Rumina Velshi, Canadian engineer and civil servant, President of the Canadian Nuclear Safety Commission
