= Madawaska Mine =

Abandoned uranium mine in Ontario, Canada

Madawaska Mine (Faraday Mine)
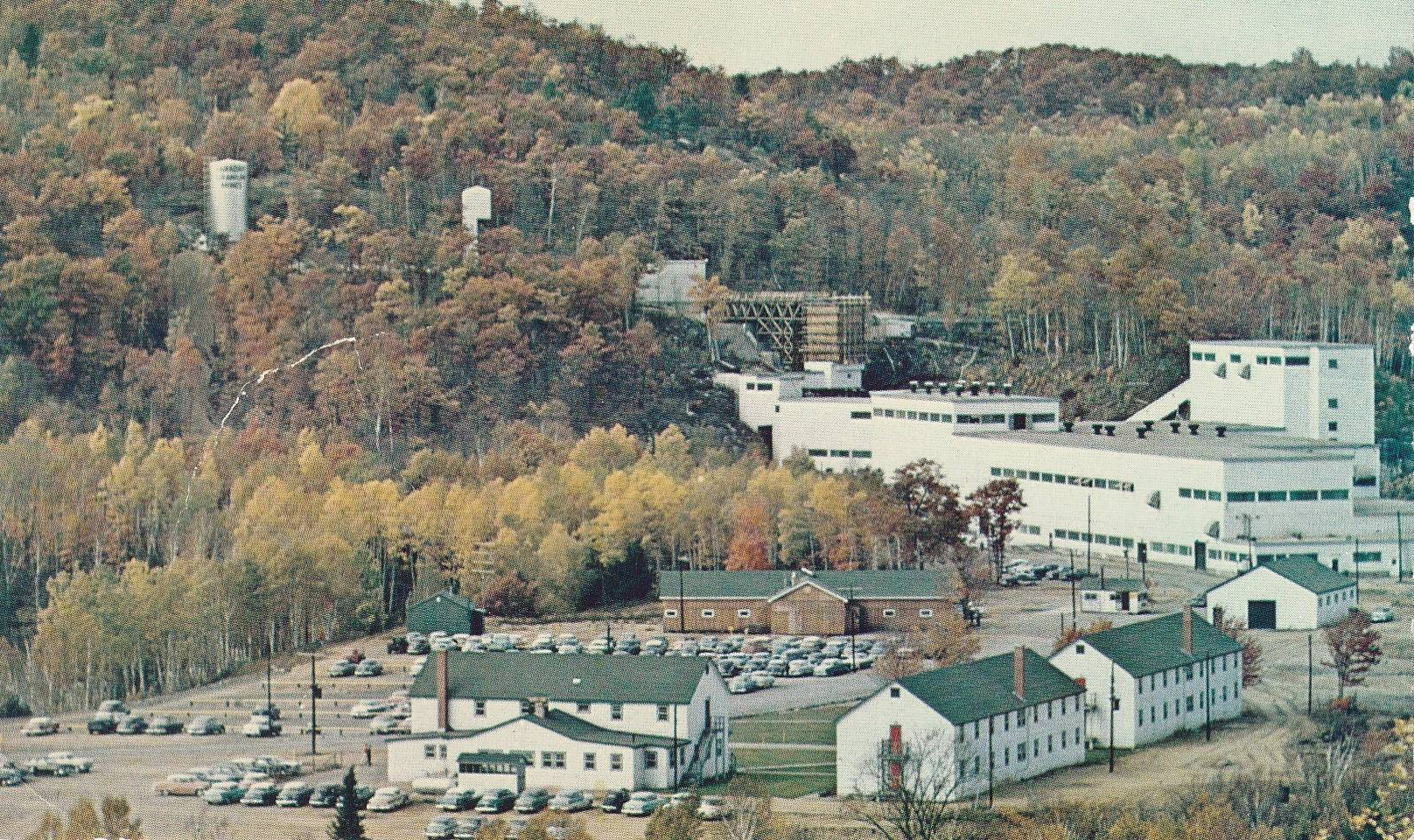
- Madawaska Mine in 1962

- Location near Bancroft, Ontario Madawaska Mine (Southern Ontario) Madawaska Mine (Ontario)
- Location: Faraday, Ontario, Ontario, Canada; 45°01′21.5″N 77°55′15.2″W
- Products: Uranium oxide
- Production: 9,000,000 lbs (4,082 tonnes)
- Opened: 1954
- Active: 1954-1964; 1975-1982
- Closed: 1982
- Company: Ovintiv
- Website: http://www.madawaskamine.com/

Madawaska Mine (previously known as Faraday Mine) is a decommissioned underground uranium mine in Faraday, near the town of Bancroft, Ontario, which produced 9 million pounds (4,082 tonnes) of U_{3}O_{8} concentrate, at an average ore grade of 0.1074%, during its two periods of production.

Madawaska Mine produced uranium for the longest period out of the four nearby mines (the three others being Bicroft Mine, Greyhawk Mine, and Dyno Mine).

Aside from uranium, the mine is also a renowned source of calcite crystals, ilmenite crystals, kainosite-(Y), Molybdenite, and uranophane crystals.

== Discovery of uranium (1922 to 1954) ==
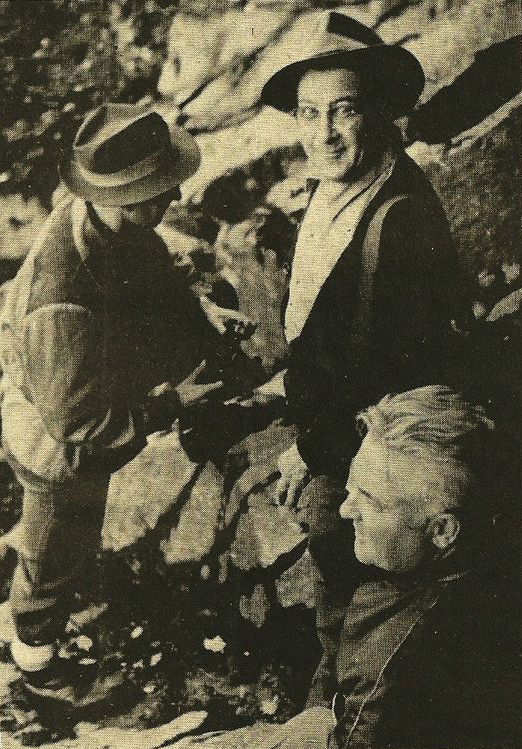
Arthur Shore in 1955

Uranium was first discovered in the Cardiff in 1922 by W. M. Richardson. Between 1953 and 1956, one hundred area prospects were opened, including one by Bancroft prospector Arthur H. Shore, whose discovery of uranium was first confirmed in 1949. He purchased the land on 22 June 1949 and founded Faraday Uranium Mines Limited. Mr. Shore sold control of the company to Augustus Exploration Limited, who started full development of the site in 1952.

== Mining operations as Faraday Mine (1954 to 1964) ==
Mining operations occurred from 1954 to 1964 by Faraday Uranium Mines Limited with the mine being known as the Faraday Mine.

In January 1956, a contract was agreed with Eldorado Mining and Refining Limited to buy the uranium, triggering an economic boom in the area, with houses for company executives being built at nearby Bow Lake and 40 houses for workers being built on the company's land in Bancroft.

On 4 April 1957, the first ore reached the concentrator and on 14 April the first uranium precipitate was produced. Production was initially 1,000 tons per day, later increasing to 1,600 tons per day.

The workers unionized in 1957, forming Local 1006 Bancroft Mine and Mill Worker's Union.

The decline of global demand for uranium shut the mine down in 1964 destroying the local economy. By that time 5.8 million pounds of uranium oxide had been produced. Local Catholic priest Rev. Henry Maloney, the brother of former Ontario Ombudsman Arthur Maloney, led the community to demand support from the Government of Ontario and Government of Canada to extend the contracts buying uranium. Canadian Prime Minister John Diefenbaker, relying on an old agreement with the United Kingdom to buy uranium from Canada, was able to prolong the life of the mine by eighteen months, giving the community enough time to plan for the closure. At this time, the mine was 51% owned by Federal Resource Corporation of Salt Lake City and 49% owned by Consolidated Canadian Faraday Limited, who spent $2 million from 1966 to 1975 on site maintenance and exploration.

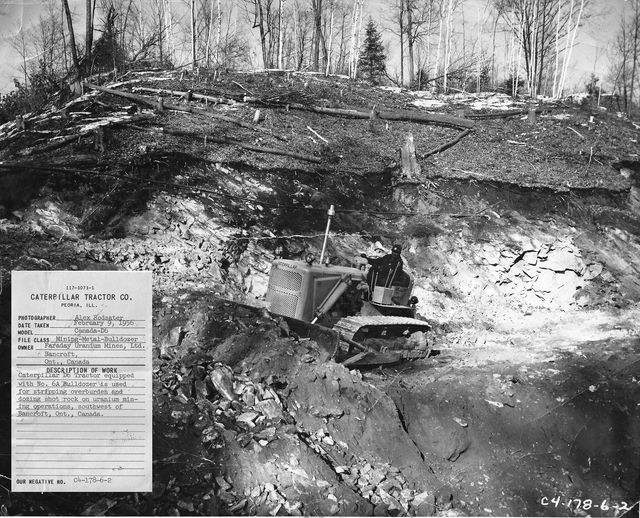
Caterpillar bulldozer at Faraday Mine in 1956

Aside from uranium, the mine was a source of calcite crystals, ilmenite crystals, kainosite-(Y), Molybdenite, and uranophane crystals.

== Mining operations as Madawaska Mine (1976 to 1982) ==
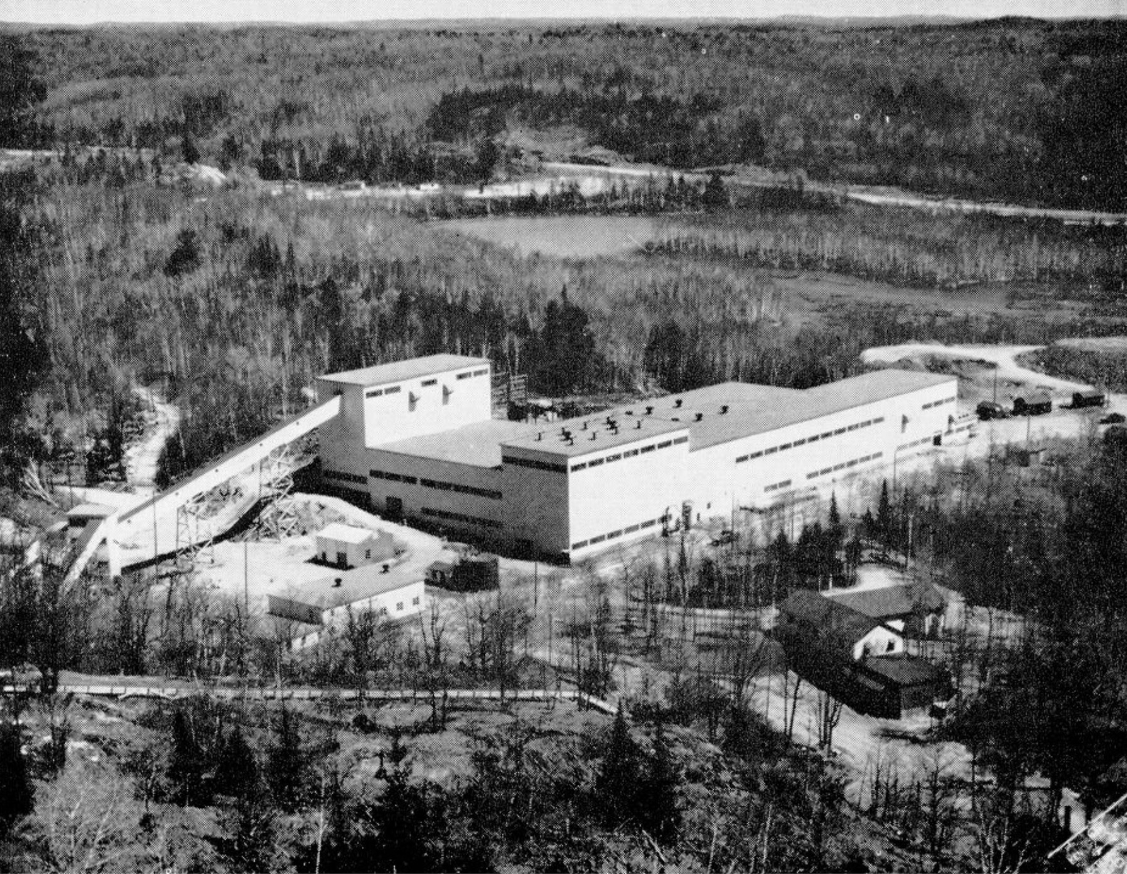
The mine's mill, 1957

In 1976, the cost of nuclear power was 25% of the cost of power generation by fossil fuel and global demand for uranium was increased. $7 million was invested to rehabilitate the mine, funded by a loan from the Canadian Bank of Commerce and the mine reopened as the Madawaska Mine on 10 September 1976. 70 people attending the opening, The Northern Miner journal noted that no government representatives attended the opening while also commenting on increasing taxes and government regulation of the uranium industry. In 1976 W. Clarke Campbell was the president of the mine.

The shaft into the uranium-bearing pegmatite reached a depth of 473 metres (1,552 ft). During this period, the mine was producing 1,500 ton of ore per day.

Ownership was 51% by Salt Lake City based Federal Resources Corporation and 49% Consolidated Canadian Faraday Limited.

W. Clarke. Campbell was the president of Consolidated Canadian Faraday Limited in 1976 and 1980.

In 1979 shareholders earned $0.67 per share (totalling $2,379,000), in 1980 they earned $0.58 per share (totalling $2,087,000).

The mine was managed by Del Wilson, the same man who opened the mine in 1954 and closed it in 1964. There were 240 staff in at the time of opening in 1976, 75% of whom had worked at the mine in phase 1. In 1976 management had plans to employ 60 more staff in 1977, bringing the payroll up to $5 million per year.

In 1981, 2,958 local residents signed a petition that was delivered to the Ontario Legislature demanding that withdraw permission given to the Atomic Energy Control Board to dump 4,000 tons of radioactive contaminated soil from Scarborough on the mine's tailings.

The uranium was sold to Agip who were an Italian government agency responsible for buying uranium until 1982, when Agip cancelled their contract to buy uranium at $32.75 a pound. In 1982, Faraday Resources Inc declared a $1.2 million loss due to the discontinuation of the mining. The payroll in 1982 was $12 million and the closure of the mine had a negative impact on he local Bancroft economy. By 1982, Ontario Hydro had switched away from buying uranium from Bancroft and were buying from Elliot Lake mines.

More efficient production had also started in Saskatchewan: while it was possible to extract one or two pounds of uranium per ton of ore mined in Bancroft, it was possible to extract 40 pounds per ton from uranium mines in Saskatchewan.

== Decommissioning and rehabilitation (1982 to present) ==
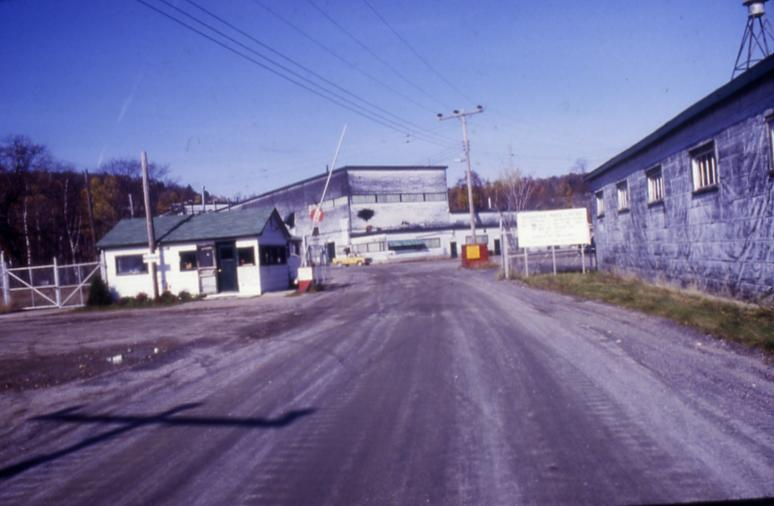
Entrance to the mine, circa 1985

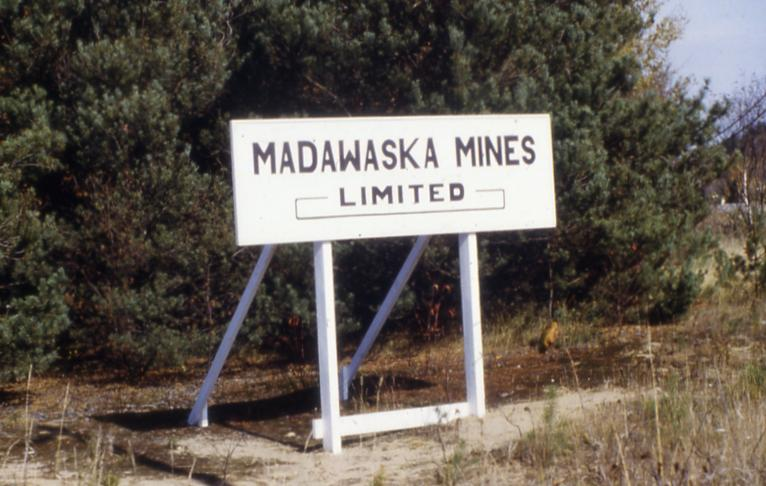
Entrance sign, circa 1985

After the closure, the tailing site attracted mineral collectors, especially to the annual Bancroft Rockbound Gemboree which tourists travelled to Bancroft in search of gems and minerals.

After the dissolution of owners Madawaska Mines Limited in 2005, the Canadian Nuclear Safety Commission revoked the operating license for the mine in 2011. Ownership shifted to Conwest Explorations Limited, later to Alberta Energy Corporation which then became EnCana, which in 2020 became Ovintiv, who placed their ownership under subsidiary company EWL Management Limited. EWL was dissolved into Ovintiv Canada ULC in February 2022.

Since inspections found improper surface protection of tailing in 2015, the mine has been undergoing rehabilitation by EWL, who contracted Golder Associates as the main contractor.

In 2019, water quality monitoring requested by the Canadian Nuclear Safety Commission (CNSC) found radioactive and hazardous contamination in two of several water samples in the nearby Bentley Lake. Subsequent inspections in 2020 from nearby locations reported no contamination. Water testing commissioned by the CNSC between 2018 and 2020 found uranium concentrations in nearby Bow Lake at 50 μg/L, exceeding the Canadian Water Quality Guidelines for the Protection of Aquatic Life limit of 15 μg/L. Risk assessments note that the uranium would "not result in adverse effects on any species of aquatic life from exposure to those concentrations in surface water, sediment and groundwater associated with the Madawaska decommissioned site. With the improvements to water flow and the new cover system that is almost completed for the site, future results should demonstrate that migration of contaminants into the surrounding environment has been limited."

On May 6, 2022, CNSC took regulatory action against Ovintiv. Ovintiv absorbed EWL Management Limited on February 22, 2022 and assumed responsibilities for the mine, but not updated any of the licensing documentation to reflect the change. Using powers of the Nuclear Safety and Control Act, CNSC issued an order for Ovintiv to comply with the licensing requirements previously issued to EWL Management Limited. (Note: See External Link)

Over the two periods of production, the mine produced 9 million pounds (4,082 tonnes) of U_{3}O_{8} concentrate, at an average ore grade of 0.1074%. 4,000,000 tonnes of waste remain on site.

== Mine safety ==
On 10 April 1959, 21-year-old miner George Edwin Heinze was killed when a 10-ton rock fell on him at the 600 foot level.

In 1977, the rate of accidents in Madawaska Mine was the worst of the three uranium mines in Ontario with workers compensation claimed occurring at a rate of 112 for every million hours worked. Safety conditions in the mine were described as appalling by James Fisher, a consultant employed by the Ontario Legislature.

== See also ==
- Uranium mining in the Bancroft area
- Uranium ore deposits
- List of uranium mines
- Uranium mining
- List of mines in the Bancroft area
