= DYKQ =

Radyo Muscovado (DYKQ)
- Kabankalan; Philippines
- Broadcast area: Kabankalan and surrounding areas
- Frequency: 100.5 MHz
- Branding: 100.5 Radyo Muscovado Sweet FM

Programming
- Languages: Hiligaynon, Filipino, English
- Format: College Radio
- Affiliations: K5 News FM

Ownership
- Owner: Gold Label Broadcasting System
- Operator: Central Philippines State University

History
- First air date: 2021

Technical information
- Licensing authority: NTC
- Power: 500 watts
- ERP: 1000 watts

DYKQ (100.5 FM), on-air as 100.5 Radyo Muscovado Sweet FM, is a radio station owned by Gold Label Broadcasting System and operated by the Central Philippines State University. Its studio is located in John Paul Bldg. Brgy. Bacuyangan, Kabankalan. Despite being a college radio, it is an affiliate of K5 News FM for its news and talk programming.
