= Section 92(10) of the Constitution Act, 1867 =

Section 92(10) of the Constitution Act, 1867, also known as the works and undertakings power, grants the provincial legislatures of Canada unless otherwise noted in section (c), the authority to legislate on:

10. Local Works and Undertakings other than such as are of the following Classes:

(a) Lines of Steam or other Ships, Railways, Roads, Telegraphs, and other Works and Undertakings connecting the Province with any other or others of the Provinces, or extending beyond the Limits of the Province;

(b) Lines of Steam Ships between the Province and any British or Foreign Country;

(c) Such Works as, although wholly situate within the Province, are before or after their Execution declared by the Parliament of Canada to be for the general Advantage of Canada or for the Advantage of Two or more of the Provinces.

Section 92(10)(a) and (b) grants federal jurisdiction over modes of interprovincial and international transportation and communication, leaving intraprovincial transportation and communication to the provinces. The legal interpretation ejusdem generis limits the scope of the exceptions to subsection 92(10). The declaratory power conferred to the federal parliament under 92(10) c) however, applies to works of all types. The Parliament of Canada exercises authority over these three matters under section 91(29), which states:

29. Such Classes of Subjects as are implicitly excepted in the Enumeration of the Classes of Subjects by this Act assigned exclusively to the Legislatures of the Provinces.

== Extent of jurisdiction ==
The Judicial Committee of the Privy Council held that:

- "These works are physical things not services."
- "'Undertaking' is not a physical thing but is an arrangement under which of course physical things are used."

A transportation or communication work or undertaking will be under government control under section 92(10) where it is extending outside of the province. This does not mean that a physical connection is necessary or that it is sufficient. What matters is the nature of the work or undertaking as a going concern. A transport or communication undertaking will be considered "connecting" where business operations extend beyond the provincial border, or has a close operational relationship with an inter-provincial undertaking

The reference to "Telegraphs" has been held to include telephones. In the Radiocommunication reference, the Judicial Committee of the Privy Council held that radiocommunication was a matter of a national scope and was therefore a matter of exclusive federal jurisdiction. Television programming has been held to be part of that jurisdiction but it is unclear whether it is so only because it is ancillary to the regulation of communications undertaking.

== Declaratory power under section 92(10)(c) ==
In general terms, works declared by the Parliament of Canada to be "for the general Advantage of Canada" or "for the Advantage of Two or more of the Provinces" tend to be part of the national infrastructure.

Whenever parliament invokes the power, it gains not only jurisdiction over the work but also any necessarily incidental operations. In Ontario Hydro v. Ontario (1993), such a declaration had been made with respect to Ontario Hydro's nuclear plant. The Supreme Court held that that declaration gave Parliament the authority to regulate the work "as a going concern" which included jurisdiction over workers at the plant and their labour unions.

The declaration must be made by the passing of legislation, but in addition to declaring specific works, whole classes of work can be defined as being "for the general advantage of Canada" by default; the Atomic Energy Control Act, for example, deemed all nuclear power plants to fall into this category. From 1867 to 1961 there were 470 uses of the declaratory power, of which 84% related to railways.

As of 2006, the declaratory power has been invoked at least 422 times, but not since 1961, and of which 64% was related to railways. Modern legislation, such as the One Canadian Economy Act, provides similar powers to bring major projects under federal jurisdiction, which have largely replaced formal declarations pursuant to section 92(10).
