= Gold Label Broadcasting System =

Philippine radio network

- Type: Private
- Industry: Broadcast
- Founded: 1990
- Headquarters: Dumaguete, Philippines
- Key people: Danilo B. Dy (President & CEO)

Gold Label Broadcasting System is a Philippine radio network. Its corporate office is located along San Juan St. cor. Perdices St., Dumaguete. GLBS operates a number of stations across places in Negros.

== GLBS Stations ==
Branding	Callsign	Frequency	Location	Operator
Power 91	DYGB	91.7 MHz	Dumaguete	—N/a
RFM	DYRY	102.1 MHz	Mabinay	Ruiz Development Corporation
K5 News FM Bayawan	DYGL	106.5 MHz	Bayawan	5K Broadcasting Network
K5 News FM San Carlos	DYGM	95.7 MHz	San Carlos	5K Broadcasting Network
Radyo Muscovado	DYKQ	100.5 MHz	Kabankalan	Central Philippines State University
