= Ontario Hydro v Ontario (Labour Relations Board) =

- Supreme Court of Canada

Hearing: November 9, 1992 Judgment: September 30, 1993
- Full case name: Ontario Hydro v Ontario Labour Relations Board, Society of Ontario Hydro Professional and Administrative Employees, Canadian Union of Public Employees ‑‑ C.L.C. Ontario Hydro Employees Union, Local 1000, Coalition to Stop the Certification of the Society on Behalf of Certain Employees, Tom Stevens, C. S. Stevenson, Michelle Morrissey‑O'Ryan and George Orr
- Citations: [1993] 3 S.C.R. 327
- Ruling: Appeal was dismissed.

Court membership
- Chief Justice: Antonio Lamer; Puisne Justices: Gérard La Forest, Claire L'Heureux-Dubé, John Sopinka, Charles Gonthier, Peter Cory, Beverley McLachlin, Frank Iacobucci, John C. Major

Reasons given
- Majority: La Forest J., joined by L'Heureux-Dubé and Gonthier JJ.
- Concurrence: Lamer C.J.
- Dissent: Iacobucci J., joined by Sopinka and Cory JJ.
- McLachlin and Major JJ. took no part in the consideration or decision of the case.

Laws applied
- Bell Canada v. Quebec, [1988] 1 S.C.R. 749

Ontario Hydro v Ontario (Labour Relations Board), [1993] 3 S.C.R. 327, is a leading constitutional decision of the Supreme Court of Canada on the federal declaratory power and the peace, order and good government power under the Constitution Act, 1867. The Court held that the regulation of relations between Ontario government and employees of a nuclear power plant was under federal jurisdiction under the federal declaratory power of section 92(10)(c) of the Constitution Act, 1867, and the national concern branch of the peace, order and good government.

== Background ==
Ontario Hydro is a power generating corporation owned by the Ontario government. Among their power generating plants include five nuclear generators. These nuclear plants fall under the jurisdiction of the federal Atomic Energy Control Act. Section 18 of that Act provides that all works and undertakings "constructed for the production, use and application of atomic energy" are works that are "for the general advantage of Canada".

The Society of Ontario Hydro Professional and Administrative Employees applied for certification under the Ontario Labour Relations Act to represent the employees of Ontario Hydro including those who work at the nuclear plants. The Coalition to Stop the Certification of the Society, another group of employees, attempted to prevent the society from getting certification on the grounds that nuclear stations were in the jurisdiction of the Canada Labour Code which would require them to apply to the Canada Industrial Relations Board.

The Ontario Labour Relations Board agreed with the Coalition and held that they did not have jurisdiction to certify the bargaining unit. On appeal to the Court of Appeal for Ontario the ruling of the Board was upheld.

The issue before the Supreme Court was stated as:

Does the Labour Relations Act of Ontario or the Canada Labour Code constitutionally apply to the matter of labour relations between Ontario Hydro and those of its employees who are employed in Ontario Hydro's nuclear electrical generating stations which have been declared to be for the general advantage of Canada under s. 18 of the Atomic Energy Control Act?

In a four to three decision the Court denied the appeal and held that employees who are connected with the nuclear facilities are subject to the federal Labour Relations Code.

== Opinion of the Court ==
Three opinions were written. One by LaForest, with L'Heureux-Dubé and Gonthier JJ concurring, a second by Lamer C.J., and a dissent by Iacobucci, with Sopinka and Cory JJ concurring.

=== LaForest ===
La Forest first considered the invocation of the declaratory power under section 92(10)(c) of the Constitution by the Atomic Energy Act. He observed that if it was properly invoked the work would automatically fall within the jurisdiction of the federal government by virtue of section 91(29). The question is what matters would be included. When a work is declared, stated La Forest, it includes "work as a going concern" or "functioning unit", which necessarily involves control over its management and its operation. Consequently, labour relations would presumably be included in the declaration and so the province cannot legislate in relation to the labour of the declared work. La Forest dismisses the proposition that the work also falls under section 92A and consequently cannot be granted to the federal government.

La Forest considered the application of the "peace, order and good government" power. He found that nuclear generators are a matter of national concern and so must fall under federal jurisdiction in section 91 of the Constitution. The production and use of nuclear energy has clear international and intra-provincial implications, and it is sufficiently distinct and separate to fall under the p.o.g.g. power.

=== Lamer ===
Lamer's opinion emphasized that federal power under both p.o.g.g. and the declaratory power must be carefully described and been respectful of the division of powers. Consequently, the p.o.g.g. power will only encompass the production of nuclear power and related safety concerns, but not employment at the plant.

However, Lamer added that the power to regulate labour relations is "an integral and essential part of Parliament's declaratory and p.o.g.g. jurisdictions." As well there was a clear intention of the government to include the matters in the preamble to the Act as well as the regulations. Lamer further noted that internationally practices of regulating nuclear plants have included supervising employees.

Lamer held that it is not possible to make a distinction between what is considered part of the "undertaking" and the "integrated activities related to" it. There must be a prima facie presumption that jurisdiction of labour relations is held by the federal government. The "normal and habitual" activities of the employees are intimately related to control of the facilities.

Lastly, Lamer rejects the argument that the federal government is precluded from regulating labour relations on the grounds that the provincial government has been exercising jurisdiction for a long period of time.

=== Iacobucci ===
Justice Iacobucci wrote a dissent, which was joined by Justices Cory and Sopinka. Iacobucci agreed with the majority that the declaratory power only extended to matters that were "integral to the federal interest in the work". He found that this was consistent with general approach to constitutional interpretation where no head of power had the power to subsume the other.

Iacobucci disagreed with the majority that labour relations of the plant's employees were integral to the effective regulation of the plants. From reading the preamble there is no indication that labour was to be included, which said that the federal interest was for the safety, health and security concerns. Labour relations only aims at "industrial peace" and better working conditions for employees, which is not directly related to the plant. This is supported by section 92A of the Constitution Act, 1867. If Parliament wants to include labour relations they could easily do so with their declaratory power.

Iacobucci also found that the p.o.g.g. power does not include labour relations. He emphasized the application of "balancing principles" between the two heads of power. He held that labour relations for plant employees was not part of a "single, distinctive, and indivisible matter identified as atomic energy."

== See also ==
- List of Supreme Court of Canada cases (Lamer Court)
