= Bow Lake (Ontario) =

Lake in Eastern Ontario

- Location in Faraday township, Ontario Bow Lake (Southern Ontario)
- Location: Faraday township, Hastings County, Ontario, Canada
- Coordinates: 45.015°N 77.938°W
- Type: Lake

Bow Lake is a lake in Faraday township, Hastings County, Ontario, Canada.

In the late 20th-century, the area around the lake was used for uranium mining and the housing of mine workers.

== Description ==
The lake is arc shaped, approximately 2.5km in length.

It was named as Bow Lake in 1948 and is located at GPS 45.015, -77.938 in Hastings County, Ontario.

== History ==
The former Faraday Mine (later known as Madawaska Mine) was located North East of the lake. The mine operated from the 1950's to the 1960s and from 1976 to 1982 and produced 4,000,000 tones of tailings that are located in two areas 100 to 200 metres from the shore. Housing for mining company executives were built around the lake's shore.

As of 2012, uranium remained highly bioavailable in the lake as a result of mining activity.

Water testing commissioned by the Canadian Nuclear Safety Commission between 2018 and 2020 found uranium concentrations in the lake at 50 μg/L, exceeding the Canadian Water Quality Guidelines for the Protection of Aquatic Life limit of 15 μg/L. Risk assessments note that the uranium would "not result in adverse effects on any species of aquatic life from exposure to those concentrations in surface water, sediment and groundwater associated with the Madawaska decommissioned site. With the improvements to water flow and the new cover system that is almost completed for the site, future results should demonstrate that migration of contaminants into the surrounding environment has been limited."

== See also ==
- List of lakes of Ontario
- Uranium mining in the Bancroft area
