= Gordon Lake mine =

Decommissioned mine in Ontario, Canada

Gordon Lake Mine
- Location near Werner Lake, Ontario
- Location: near Werner Lake, Ontario, Ontario, Canada; 50°29′08″N 94°20′49″W
- Products: PRIMARY: Copper, Nickel; SECONDARY: Gold, Palladium, Platinum, Silver
- Opened: 1957
- Active: 1942 - 1969
- Closed: 1972
- Company: Ovintiv

Gordon Lake Mine was an underground copper mine near Werner Lake in the Kenora District of Ontario Canada.

It was in full operation from 1957 to 1969. Some metals were produced up until 1972 as a result of the site clean up operations.

== Location ==
The mine is located 55 miles northwest of Kenora close to the Ontario-Manitoba provincial boundary. It is located above four underground bodies of ore and the quartz vein known as the Onaping Formation.

== Discovery and exploration ==
H. Byberg and A. Vanderbrink first discovered nickel and copper minerals at the site in 1942.

The site was surveyed and subject to diamond drilling by staff from Noranda Mines, Rexora Mining Corporation Ltd, and Inco and Falconbridge Nickel Mines Ltd between 1942 and 1945.

Underground work was undertaken by Quebec Nickel Corporation between 1952 and 1954 which produced a 260 foot deep shaft.

Between 1955 and 1958 Quebec Nickel Corporation and Eastern Smelting and Refining Company Limited merged to become Eastern Mining and Smelting Corp which sank a second shaft to 1,297 feet in depth, creating six levels. The minerals mined composed of chalcopyrite, pyrrhotite, and pentlandite.

Between 1959 and 1962, Eastern Mining and Smelting Corp became Nickel Mining and Smelting Corp and lowered the second shaft to 1,683 feet deep, adding 3 more levels and added a 750-ton-per-day concentrator.

== Production ==
A mill was built on site between 1962 and 1973 which processed 1,587,146 tons of ore. That ore produced 14 million pounds of copper, 26.7 million pounds of nickel and unknown smaller quantities of platinum and palladium.

Between 1963 and 1966, Nickel Mining and Smelting became Metal Mines Limited and continued drilling.

In 1967-68 Consolidated Canadian Faraday Limited took over Metal Mines, continued drilling and increased the concentrator capacity to 1200 tons-per-day.

== Final years ==
Between 1969 there was modest production, not from mining, but from clean up operations. The site was rehabilitated in 1994.

The site was owned by EWL Management Limited until 2022, when EWL merged with its parent company Ovintiv Canada ULC.
