= Greyhawk Mine =

Abandoned uranium mine in Ontario, Canada

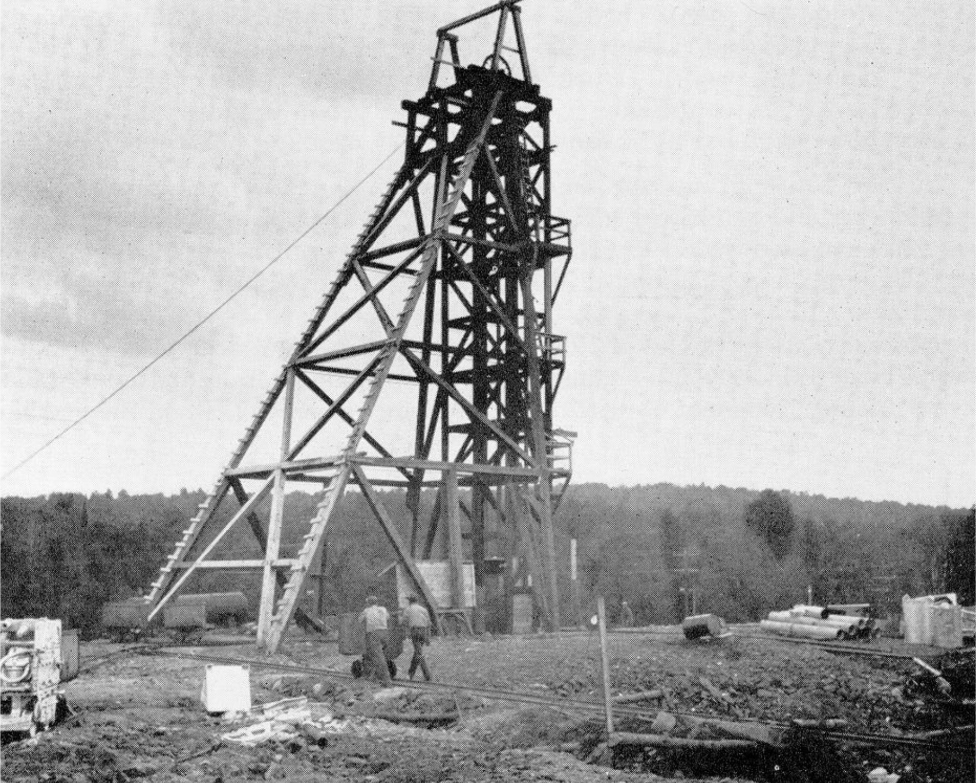
- Mine headframe, 1956

- Location in Faraday, Ontario Greyhawk Mine (Southern Ontario) Greyhawk Mine (Ontario)
- Location: Faraday, Ontario, Ontario, Canada; 45°1′54″N 77°53′44″W
- Products: Uranium oxide
- Production: 80,247 tonnes
- Opened: 1957–1959, 1976–1982
- Closed: 1982
- Company: Ovintiv

Greyhawk Mine is a decommissioned underground uranium mine located in Faraday Township near Bancroft, Ontario. It operated from 1954 to 1959 and from 1976 to 1982. The mine produced 80,247 tons of uranium ore, of which 0.069% was U_{3}O_{8} worth $834,899.

Aside from uranium, the mine has produced some of the world's best samples of Kainosite-(Y).

== Uranium discovery - 1922 to 1954 ==
Uranium was first discovered in the nearby area of Cardiff in 1922 by W. M. Richardson. Between 1953 and 1956, one hundred area prospects were opened, including one by one which developed into Greyhawk Mine.

== Mine operations - 1954 to 1982 ==
In 1954, Goldhawk Porcupine Mines Limited (who later became Goldhawk Uranium Mines Limited) undertook geology surveys, drilling to 450 feet deep. During 1955 and 1956 Greyhawk Uranium Mines Limited sunk a vertical shaft to 361 feet creating three levels at depths of 110 feet, 211 feet, and 333 feet. They then drilled 114 holes (totalling 42,299 feet of drilling).

By late 1956, there were 430 feet of underground cross-cuts, 1,606 feet of drifting, and 512 feet of raising, all at the first level. Underground drilling totalled 10,542 feet over 76 holes. In 1958, the shaft was lowered further, to a new depth of 402 feet, from where lower levels were established.

The ore was processed at the nearby Faraday mill on the Faraday Mine site.

Mining operations stopped in 1959.

Faraday Uranium Mines Limited purchased the site from Goldhawk Uranium Mines Limited in 1962. Madawaska Mines Limited was formed in 1975 and purchased the site, as well as the nearby Faraday Mine, restarting mining operations in 1976 until 1982.

== Production ==
Over its two periods of operations, the mine produced 80,247 tons of uranium ore, of which 0.069% was U_{3}O_{8} worth $834,899.

In addition to uranium, the mine produced some of the world's best samples of Kainosite-(Y).

== Incidents ==
- Rosaire Adrienne Lamirande, a 36 year old machine operator, was killed by falling rock in 1958.

== Post mining ==
1978 and 1980 studies found that the natural weathering of the granite and gabbro rocks left on site has caused uranium leaching into the aquifer at concentrations ranging between 1.2 and 380 parts per billion, with higher concentrations measured deeper in the water table and in sediments.

200,000 tons of ore, averaging 0.065% U_{3}O_{8}, remain in the ground.

As processing was done offsite, there are no tailings on site, therefore unlike the other nearby former uranium mines (Faraday/Madawaka Mine, Bicroft Mine, and Dyno Mine), the Canadian Nuclear Safety Commission does not regulate the site.

The mine was owned by Ovintiv subsidiary EWL Management Limited, which merged into Ovintiv in February 2022.

== See also ==
- Uranium mining in the Bancroft area
- Uranium ore deposits
- List of uranium mines
- Uranium mining
- List of mines in the Bancroft area
