= DYGB =

Power 91 FM (DYGB)
- Dumaguete; Philippines
- Broadcast area: Southern Negros Oriental and surrounding areas
- Frequency: 91.7 MHz
- Branding: Power 91 FM

Programming
- Languages: Cebuano, Filipino
- Format: Pop MOR, News, Talk
- Affiliations: Radio Mindanao Network

Ownership
- Owner: Gold Label Broadcasting System

History
- First air date: August 10, 1991
- Former frequencies: 95.7 MHz (1991)
- Call sign meaning: Gold Label Broadcasting

Technical information
- Licensing authority: NTC
- Class: C, D, E
- Power: 5,000 watts
- ERP: 10,000 watts

DYGB (91.7 FM), broadcasting as Power 91 FM, is a radio station owned and operated by Gold Label Broadcasting System. Its studios and transmitter are located at Dy Chiao Kiao Bldg., Gov. M. Perdices cor. San Juan Sts., Dumaguete.

== History ==
DYGB began operations on August 10, 1991, as Power 95 FM, airing a CHR/Top 40 format. At the time of its launch, the station was located at 95.7 MHz.

It became the first FM radio station in Dumaguete to use Digital Audio Tape (DAT) and compact discs (CDs) for song playback and cart machines for playing national and local commercials, jingles and station promotional materials, all of which were acquired from the United States through JAM Creative Productions.

The said format has proven popular to its listeners, as it quickly became the overall #1 FM radio station in Dumaguete and the entire province of Negros Oriental.

In the same year, DYEM's owner, Negros Broadcasting and Publishing Inc., filed a case against GLBSI because the station was broadcasting nearer to that station's frequency, which is at 96.7 MHz. GLBSI later responded to DYEM's case by moving its station to 91.7 MHz, with the branding being changed to Power 91 FM.

In mid-1994, DYGB-FM was relaunched as a "news and music" FM station, shifted to the masa format with news, public affairs, commentary, public service and brokered programming to its schedule.

Since the reformat, it remains the city's most listened-to FM radio station, a distinction that still holds up to this day. It is also an affiliate station of the Radio Mindanao Network for its news content.
