= Faraday, Ontario =

Faraday
- Township (lower-tier)
- Township of Faraday
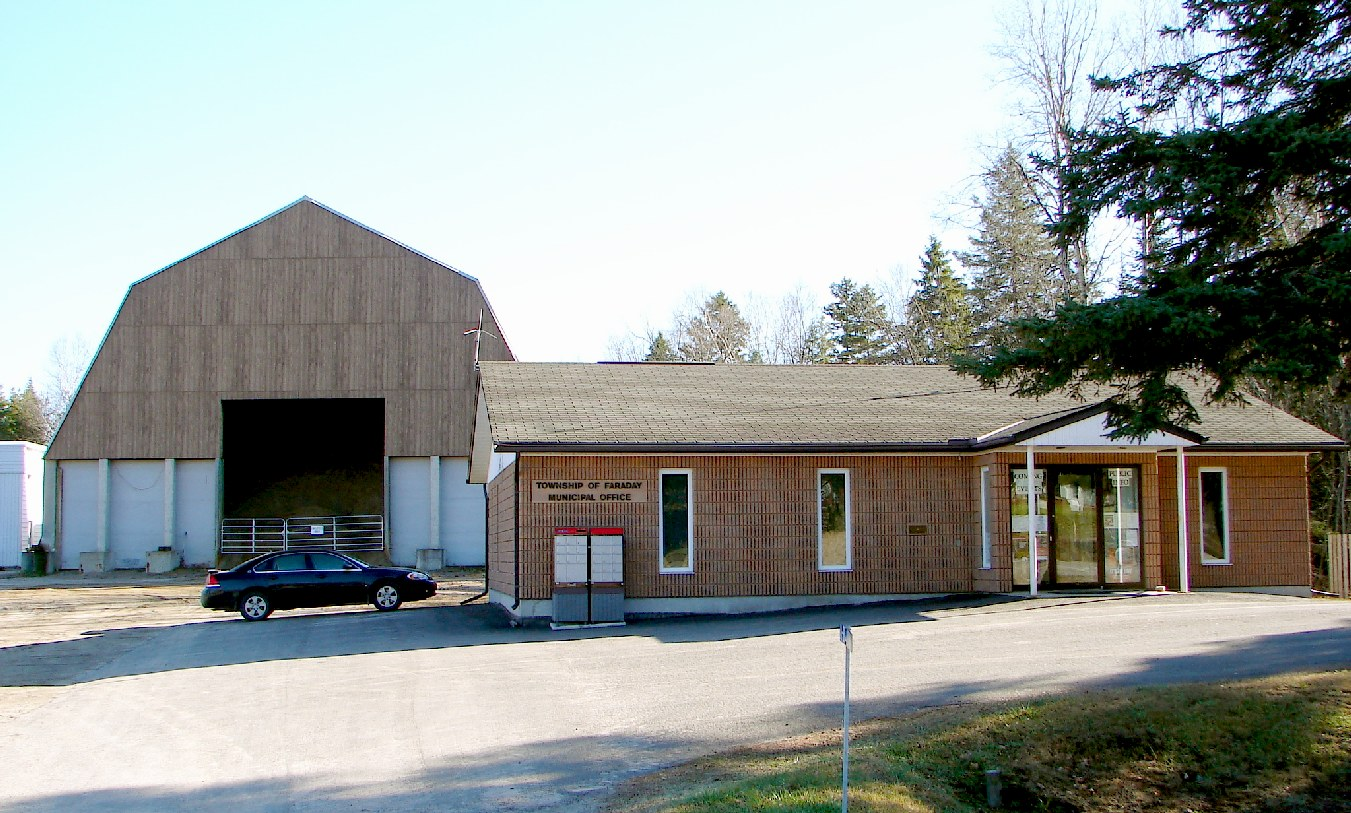
- Municipal office of Faraday Twp. along Hwy. 28

- Location within Southern Ontario
- Coordinates: 45°00′N 77°55′W
- Country: Canada
- Province: Ontario
- County: Hastings
- Settled: 1857
- Incorporated: before 1901

Government
  - Type: Township
  - Reeve: Dennis J. Purcell
  - Federal riding: Hastings—Lennox and Addington—Tyendinaga
  - Prov. riding: Hastings—Lennox and Addington

Area
  - Land: 217.44 km^{2} (83.95 sq mi)

Population (2021)
  - Total: 1,612
  - Density: 7.4/km^{2} (19/sq mi)
- Time zone: UTC-5 (EST)
  - Summer (DST): UTC-4 (EDT)
- Postal Code: K0L 1C0
- Area codes: 613 and 343
- Website: www.faraday.ca

Faraday is a township in the Canadian province of Ontario, located within Hastings County adjacent to the town of Bancroft.

== History ==
The township of Faraday was first settled in 1857, when iron ore deposits were discovered.

Prior to the 1922 discovery of uranium, mica, feldspar, and other minerals were mined on a small scale in the area. Inspired by finds of gold in nearby Eldorado (now Madoc) in 1886–7 and onwards, many people moved to the area hoping to find gold.

The Barker Quarries operated south of Marble Lake sporadically from 1908 into the late 1930s, providing marble for government buildings in Ottawa and Casa Loma and the Royal Ontario Museum in Toronto.

After the Second World War and the invention of atomic energy, global demand for uranium increased, and the Canadian government permitted uranium prospecting.

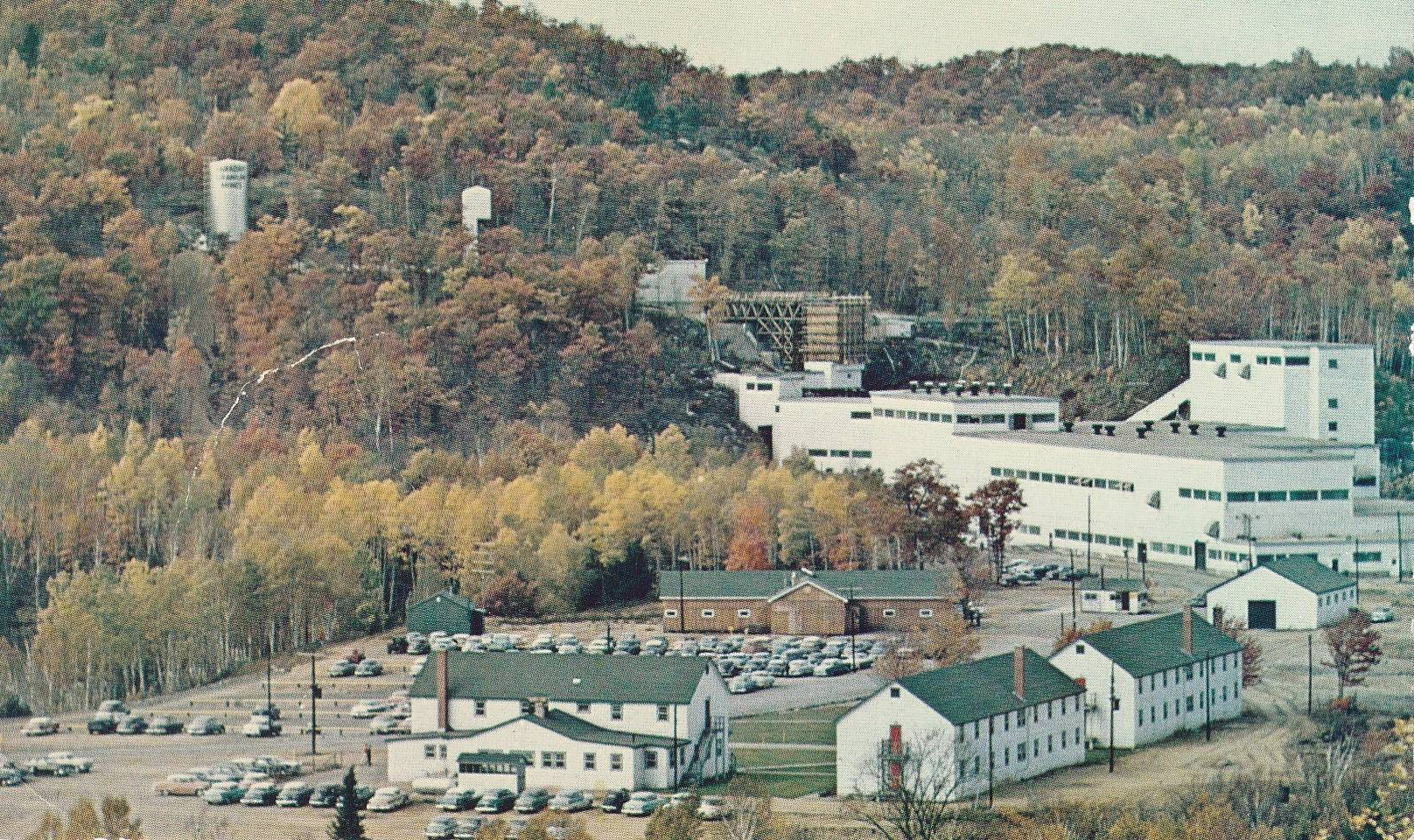
Madawaska Mine in 1962

Arthur H. Shore, an independent prospector, first found uranium at his lot in Faraday township in 1948 or 1949. He founded Faraday Uranium Mines Limited in 1949 but injured himself shortly afterwards. The mine was active from 1957 to 1964 and then reopened as the Madawaksa Mine from 1975 to 1982.

The Greyhawk Uranium mine was active from 1955 to 1959 and reopened from 1962 to 1982.

The mines attracted workers to the area, and housing for mine executives was built in Faraday and for workers in nearby Bancroft. The closure of the mines after the global supply of uranium diminished created significant hardship for the area.

== Communities ==
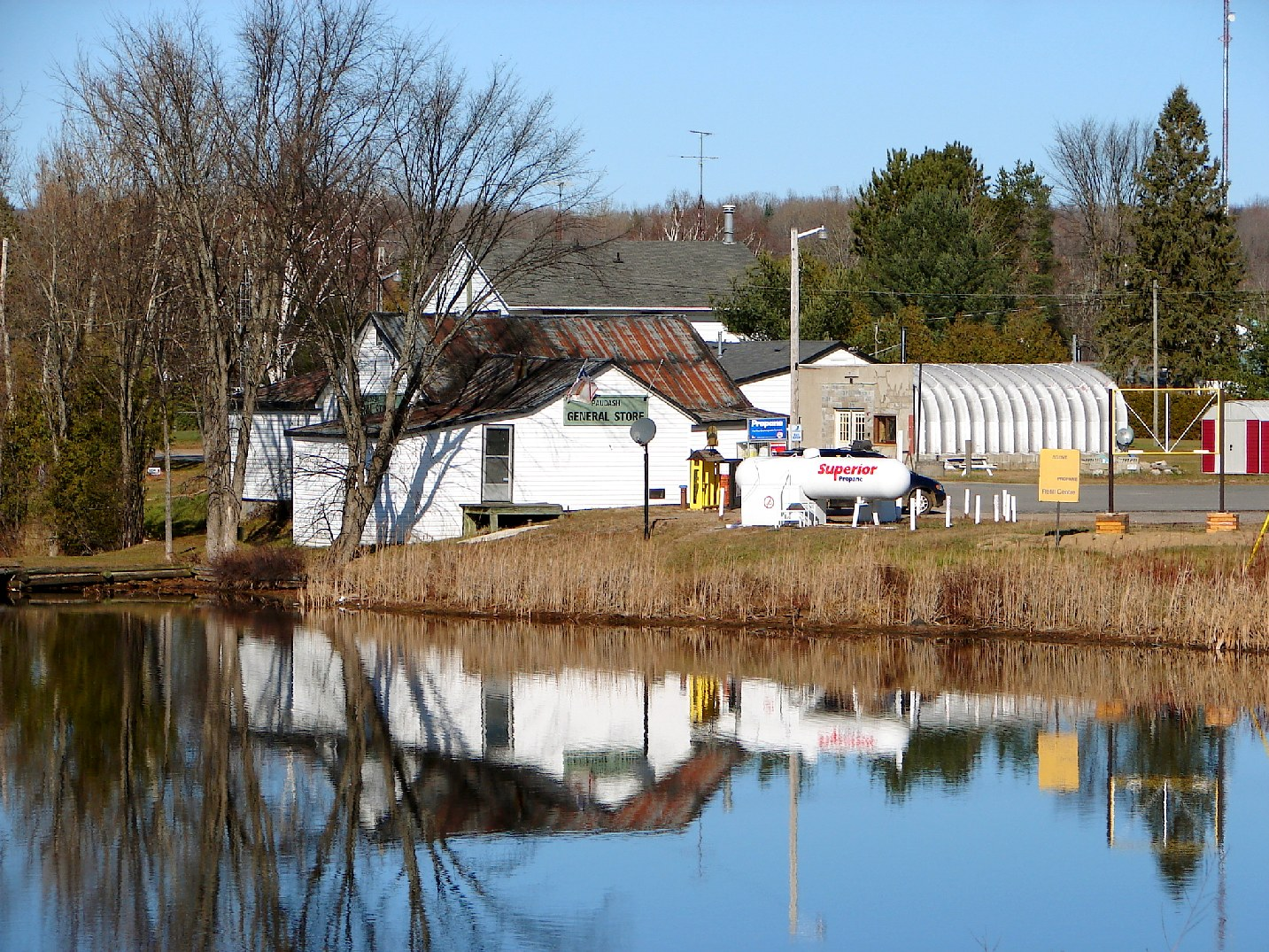
Community of Paudash

The township of Faraday comprises a number of villages and hamlets, including Bow Lake, Faraday, Monck Road, and Paudash.

== Demographics ==
In the 2021 Census of Population conducted by Statistics Canada, Faraday had a population of 1,612 living in 755 of its 1,290 total private dwellings, a change of 15.1% from its 2016 population of 1,401. With a land area of 217.44 km^{2} (83.95 sq mi), it had a population density of 7.4/km^{2} (19.2/sq mi) in 2021.

Canada census – Faraday community profile

	2021	2016	2011
Population	1,612 (+15.1% from 2016)	1401 (-4.6% from 2011)	1468 (-7.0% from 2006)
Land area	217.44 km^{2} (83.95 sq mi)	219.62 km^{2} (84.80 sq mi)	217.97 km^{2} (84.16 sq mi)
Population density	7.4/km^{2} (19/sq mi)	6.4/km^{2} (17/sq mi)	6.7/km^{2} (17/sq mi)
Median age	57.2 (M: 57.6, F: 56.8)	54.6 (M: 54.8, F: 54.2)
Private dwellings	1,290 (total) 755 (occupied)	1261 (total)	1224 (total)
Median household income	$64,000

References: 2021 2016 2011

Historical census populations – Faraday, Ontario

Year	Pop.	±%
1921	681	—
1931	745	+9.4%
1941	861	+15.6%
1951	973	+13.0%
1956	1,578	+62.2%
1961	1,570	−0.5%

Year	Pop.	±%
1966	1,018	−35.2%
1971	1,258	+23.6%
1976	1,241	−1.4%
1981	1,569	+26.4%
1986	1,376	−12.3%
1991	1,495	+8.6%

Year	Pop.	±%
1996	1,638	+9.6%
2001	1,581	−3.5%
2006	1,578	−0.2%
2011	1,468	−7.0%
2016	1,401	−4.6%
2021	1,612	+15.1%

Population counts are not adjusted for boundary changes.
Source: Statistics Canada

Mother tongue (2021):

- English as first language: 94.4%
- French as first language: 1.2%
- English and French as first language: 0.3%
- Other as first language: 3.7%

== See also ==
- List of townships in Ontario
- Bow Lake (Ontario)
