= Canadian National Calibration Reference Centre =

The National Calibration Reference Centre for Bioassay and In Vivo Monitoring (NCRC) is administered by the Radiation Protection Bureau of the Canadian Federal Department of Health. It was created in 1982 through a Memorandum of Understanding (MOU) signed between the regulator of the nuclear industry, the Canadian Nuclear Safety Commission (CNSC), formerly the Atomic Energy Control Board, and the Department of Health with the specific mission of providing "practical reference standards" for measurements used for internal dosimetry. Two other Reference Centres were created at the same time. These were to have equivalent roles for (1) external dosimetry and (2) radon and radioactive atmospheres, and were administered, respectively, by the Canadian National Research Council and the federal Department of Energy, Mines and Resources. The choice of the three agencies to act as Reference Centres was based on their expertise acquired over years of work in their respective fields and the fact that they operate independently of both the CNSC and the nuclear industry.

The role of the NCRC is in keeping with Health Canada's mandate to protect and preserve the health of Canadians. Specifically, its focus is to provide:

1. Independent external quality control on a regular basis through regularly scheduled intercomparisons;
2. Improvement of measurement techniques through advice and training; and
3. Information on improving calibrations by supplying practical reference standards and the necessary techniques.

While the provision of intercomparison programs is its principal function, the NCRC also provides the following:

1. Advice and assistance;
2. Bioassay measurements and internal dose assessments of suspected radionuclide intakes;
3. Research in collaboration with other agencies on radionuclide metabolism and biokinetics; and
4. Methods development in support of its intercomparison programs and research studies.

The NCRC provides a national calibration reference service to universities, hospitals, public utilities and private firms in Canada. This calibration is a critical step in ensuring that measurements of internal radiation doses to workers are accurate.

== Quality ==
The National Calibration Reference Centre (NCRC) was registered to ISO 9001:2000 by the Canadian General Services Board (CGSB) in December 2003. The Centre has adopted a set of standards containing technical specifications and criteria which are used as rules and guidelines to ensure that the materials, processes, and products meet the provided services.

In addition to having an in-house quality assurance program, Canadian Internal Dosimetry Services are required by the nuclear regulator, the Canadian Nuclear Safety Commission (CNSC), through its Regulatory Standard S-106: "Technical and Quality Assurance Standard for Dosimetry Services in Canada", to undergo independent testing by participating in the intercomparison programs provided by the National Calibration Reference Center for Bioassay and In Vivo Monitoring (NCRC). Dosimetry services must obtain passing results prior to receiving CNSC approval to operate as a licensed service, and at least once per year thereafter, in order to demonstrate continuing capability.

== Intercomparison programmes ==
=== In Vitro ===
The Bioassay intercomparison program is concerned with the calibration of measurements for radioactive isotopes in human urine samples. This program offers intercomparison samples for measurement of the following materials in urine:

1. Uranium
2. Tritium
3. Carbon-14
4. Tritium and Carbon-14
5. Fission and Activation Products

=== In Vivo ===
The In Vivo Monitoring intercomparison program is concerned with the calibration of measurement for radioactive isotopes directly in the human body. Phantoms or mannequins shaped to resemble parts of the human body are prepared which contain known quantities of radioactivity. Three programs are offered:

1. Thyroid
2. Lung
3. Whole Body

=== Internal Dosimetry ===
Cases are sent to participating facilities, chosen by the CNSC, that must be evaluated for the internal dose received. The results are collated by the NCRC and reported back to the regulator.

== External links and sources ==
- Canadian National Calibration Reference Centre
- Human Monitoring Laboratory
- Bioassay Laboratory
- Canadian Nuclear Safety Commission
