= Candoni =

Municipality in Negros Occidental, Philippines

Candoni Tabla Valley
- Municipality
- Municipality of Candoni
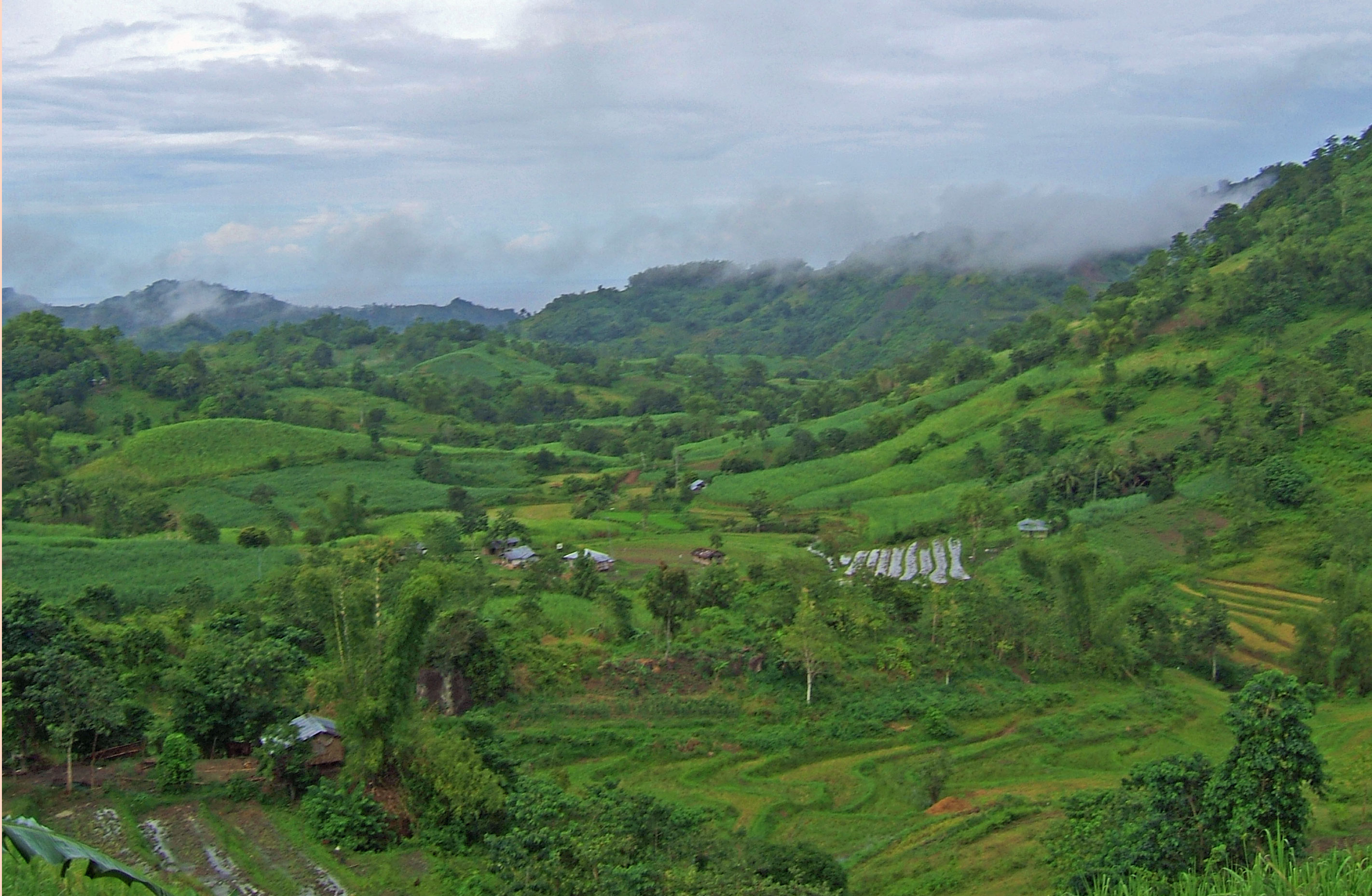
- Mountain view showing a rice field in a rural area in Candoni

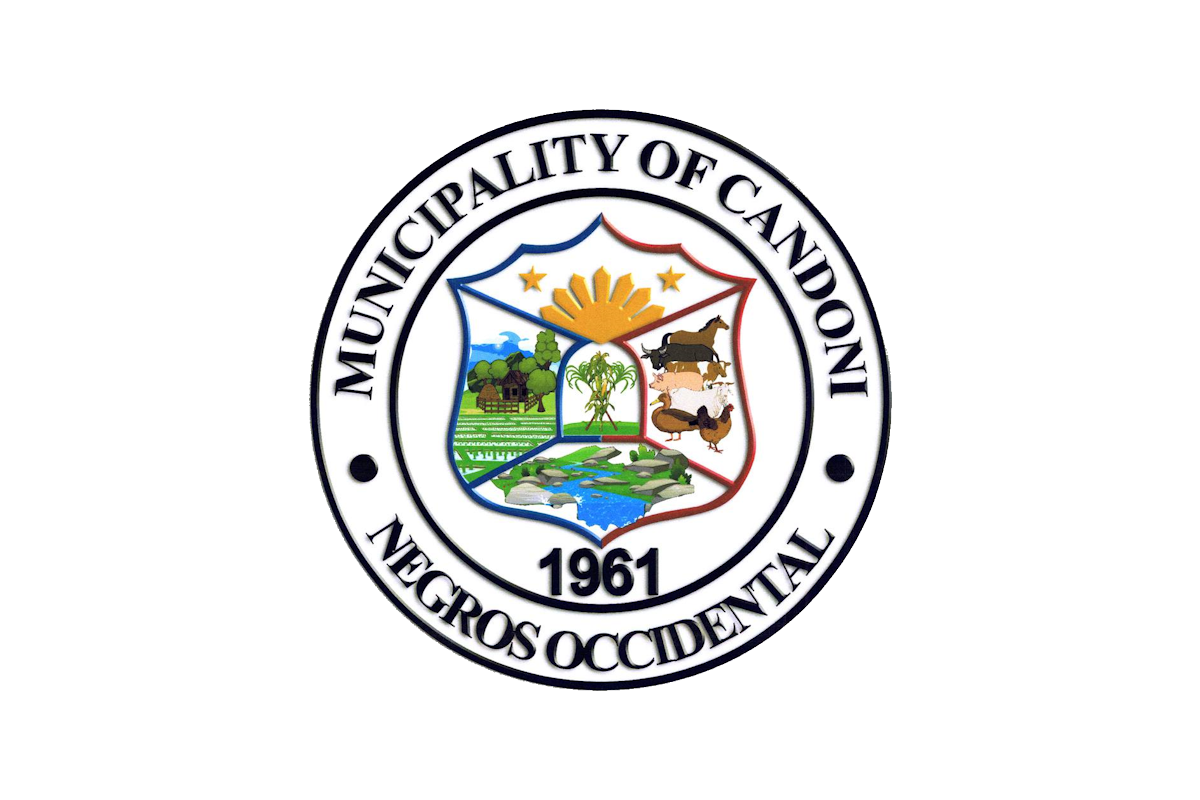
- Flag

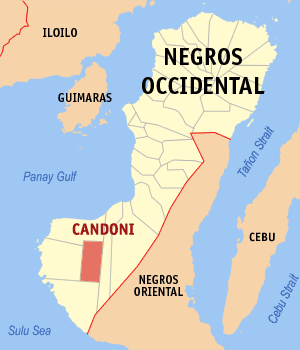
- Map of Negros Occidental with Candoni highlighted
- Interactive map of Candoni
- Location within the Philippines
- Coordinates: 9°49′N 122°36′E
- Country: Philippines
- Region: Negros Island Region
- Province: Negros Occidental
- District: 6th district
- Founded: 1958
- Barangays: 9 (see Barangays)

Government
  - Type: Sangguniang Bayan
  - Mayor: Ray R. Ruiz (PFP)
  - Vice Mayor: Edgy Z. Javellana (Lakas)
  - Representative: Mercedes Alvarez (NPC)
  - Municipal Council: Members: John Ernel M. Borris; Lady Anne L. Magada; Loriemae Joy Lambot-Gargar; Demben D. Catipunan; Perry L. Torre; Noemi Grace D. Benitez; Rodilo N. Tan; Booth Ian E. Samillano; Jeson Beton ^{◌}; ◌ ex officio SK chairman
  - Electorate: 16,457 voters (2025)

Area
  - Total: 191.70 km^{2} (74.02 sq mi)
- Elevation: 252 m (827 ft)
- Highest elevation: 609 m (1,998 ft)
- Lowest elevation: 0 m (0 ft)

Population (2024 census)
  - Total: 22,083
  - Density: 115.20/km^{2} (298.36/sq mi)
  - Households: 5,629

Economy
  - Income class: 3rd municipal income class
  - Poverty incidence: 34.07% (2023)
  - Revenue: ₱ 17.98 million (2024)
  - Assets: ₱ 628.9 million (2024)
  - Expenditure: ₱ 174.7 million (2024)
  - Liabilities: ₱ 76.13 million (2024)

Service provider
  - Electricity: Negros Occidental Electric Cooperative (NOCECO)
- Time zone: UTC+8 (PST)
- ZIP code: 6110
- PSGC: 064506000
- IDD : area code: +63 (0)34
- Native languages: Hiligaynon; Tagalog

Candoni, officially the Municipality of Candoni (Hiligaynon: Banwa sang Candoni; Cebuano: Lungsod sa Candoni; Tagalog: Bayan ng Candoni), formerly known as Tabla Valley, is a municipality in the province of Negros Occidental, Philippines. According to the 2024 census, it has a population of 22,083 people.

== Etymology ==
Candoni was derived from the native phrase Kan Dune, which translates to "belonging to Dune", a legendary beautiful maiden named Dionesia who committed suicide after being forced by her parents to marry a man she did not love.

== History ==
Formerly a barrio of the Municipality of Cauayan, Candoni started as the center of the Tabla Valley Settlement founded in 1935 by Santiago H. Diego, a prominent man from the Municipality of Isabela. He led a group of settlers with a pioneering spirit and prompted by the desire to have a piece of land they could call their own. Pooling their resources and organizing themselves into a cooperative they called Tablenos, the settlers started clearing the valley starting from where the town is now located. Many residents died of malaria.

Their efforts were noticed by the Provincial Government who supported them, starting with Gov. Emilio Gaston to Gov. Valenciano Gatuslao, who along with then Speaker Gil Montilla, helped them appeal to President Manuel Roxas in Malacanang for tangible government aid, which came in the form of the road from Dancalan, Ilog to Candoni, following the trail blazed by the Tablenos.

Candoni was finally declared a municipality on August 22, 1958, through Executive Order No. 314 signed by President Carlos P. Garcia. It was inaugurated on August 12, 1961, with Benjamin R. Nava as its first acting mayor.

During the NPA rebellion, the people of Sitio Cantomanyog in Barangay Haba declared their area as a "Zone of Peace", the first in the country ever to be declared as such by the residents composed of some 40 families, and this policy is respected by both rebels and government troops.

== Geography ==
Candoni is 130 kilometres (81 mi) from the provincial capital Bacolod and 40 kilometres (25 mi) from Sipalay. It is approximately four hour drive from Bacolod aboard a public utility vehicle and about two hours and 45 minutes on a private car. From Bacolod, buses are available at Bacolod South Terminal. From Kabankalan, one can take the public utility jeepneys or buses going to this town. Candoni is the third town with highest elevation in Negros Occidental after Don Salvador Benedicto and San Carlos.

=== Climate ===
Climate data for Candoni, Negros Occidental
Month	Jan	Feb	Mar	Apr	May	Jun	Jul	Aug	Sep	Oct	Nov	Dec	Year
Mean daily maximum °C (°F)	29 (84)	30 (86)	31 (88)	32 (90)	30 (86)	29 (84)	28 (82)	28 (82)	28 (82)	28 (82)	29 (84)	29 (84)	29 (85)
Mean daily minimum °C (°F)	21 (70)	21 (70)	22 (72)	23 (73)	24 (75)	24 (75)	24 (75)	24 (75)	24 (75)	24 (75)	23 (73)	22 (72)	23 (73)
Average precipitation mm (inches)	45 (1.8)	37 (1.5)	62 (2.4)	93 (3.7)	190 (7.5)	259 (10.2)	284 (11.2)	236 (9.3)	244 (9.6)	247 (9.7)	162 (6.4)	86 (3.4)	1,945 (76.7)
Average rainy days	10.8	8.4	12.7	16.3	26.7	28.5	29.1	28.0	27.4	28.5	23.4	15.5	255.3
Source: Meteoblue (modeled/calculated data, not measured locally)

=== Barangays ===
Candoni is politically subdivided into 9 barangays. Each barangay consists of puroks and some have sitios.

Barangay	Location	Classification	Population (May, 2010)	Population (August, 2015)
Agboy	Upland	Rural	1,749	1,902
Banga	Upland	Rural	1,961	1,853
Cabia-an	Upland	Rural	1,316	1,352
Caningay	Upland	Rural	3,026	3,066
Gatuslao	Upland	Rural	2,433	2,289
Haba	Upland	Rural	2,123	2,335
Payauan	Upland	Rural	2,346	2,326
Poblacion East	Poblacion	Urban	3,007	3,386
Poblacion West	Poblacion	Urban	3,375	3,280

As of 2015, Candoni has a total population of 21,789 and its registered voting population (as of 2015) is 12,449.

== Demographics ==
Population census of Candoni
Year	Pop.	±% p.a.
1970	10,258	—
1975	12,614	+4.23%
1980	10,831	−3.00%
1990	16,638	+4.39%
1995	17,004	+0.41%
2000	19,987	+3.53%
2007	21,748	+1.17%
2010	21,336	−0.69%
2015	21,789	+0.40%
2020	23,751	+1.83%
2024	22,083	−1.73%
Source: Philippine Statistics Authority

== Economy ==
Poverty incidence of Candoni (%)

Source: Philippine Statistics Authority

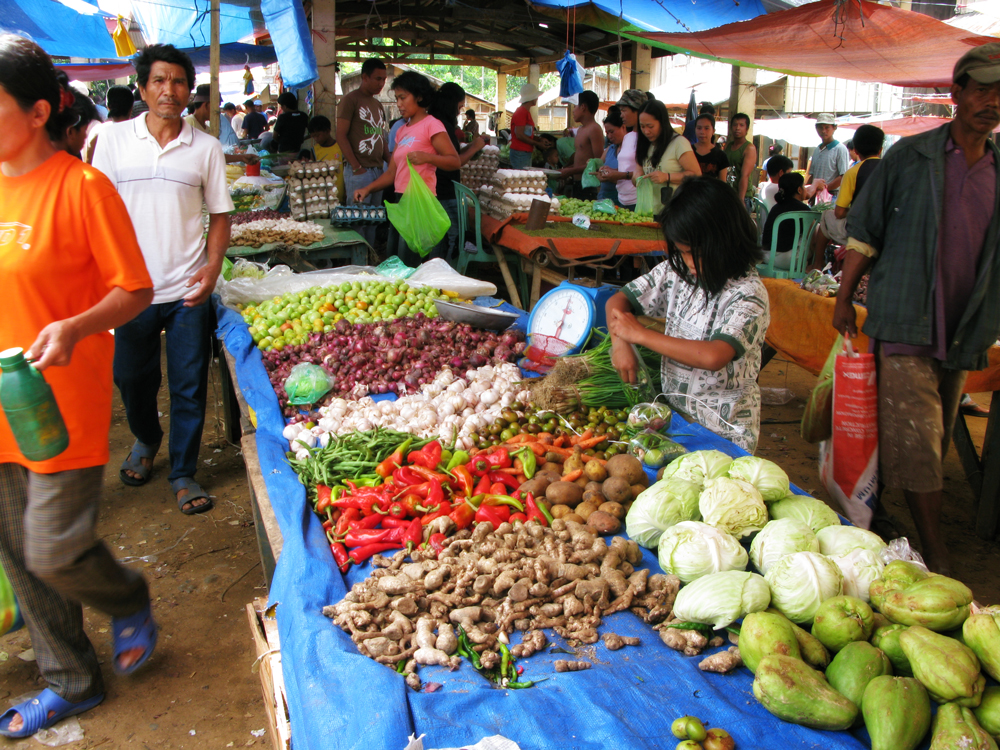
Candoni public market

Candoni is a fourth class municipality. It is a hinterland town and heavily dependent on agriculture, its main products are sugarcane, rice, corn and coffee. Candoni posted more than 200% rice sufficiency for 2017 and 2018.

=== Financial ===
Year	National rank^	Provincial rank^^	Assets	Liabilities	Net assets	Revenue
2017	427	9	286,665.00	60,476.00	226,188.00	98,036.00
2016	1009	16	138,747.00	56,695.00	82,052.00	90,144.00
2015	806	15	120,049.00	40,234.00	79,815.00	79,913.00

Source: Commission on Audit of the Philippines

^ Among 1,489 municipalities in 2015 - 2016 and 1,488 in 2017 based on net assets.

^^ Among 19 municipalities based on net assets.

=== Palm oil plantation project ===
In 2009, the DENR awarded a 25 years Integrated Forest Management Agreement to Hacienda Asia Plantation Incorporated, owned by DMCI Holdings, which also owns the Semirara Mining and Power Corporation. HAPI is a joint venture between farmer Alfred Joseph Araneta and Isidro A. Consunji-Luz Consuelo Consunji family's Sirawai Plywood and Lumber Corporation. The palm seedlings were imported from Costa Rica, Papua New Guinea, and Malaysia. Currently, HAPI has 300 farm workers with P440 daily wage each.

The residents, including the Paghidaet sa Kausawagan Development Group and Kilusang Magbubukid ng Pilipinas-Negros contested the legality of the sale of their 6,652-hectare forest land, including 4,000 hectares populated by Indigenous Peoples. They also opposed their ancestral land's reclassification for palm tree agriculture. The PHP 2-billion palm oil plantation project straddles in Barangays Gatuslao, Agboy, and Payauan. HAPI's heavy equipment destroyed their corn, pineapple, sugarcane, and vegetables plantations. About 1,000 families face eviction, displacement and livelihood disruption amid the LGU's offer to create 3,000 new jobs. The Gatuslao Agro-Forestry, Banana and Sugarcane Farmers’ Association announced the filing of Writ of Kalikasan against HAPI to stop the project's implementation. Mayor Rey R. Ruiz offered a “win-win” solution in a dialogue with affected 100 farmers.

== Tourism ==
Candoni have the following tourism sites:

- Sitio Cantomanyog Zone of Peace, Barangay Haba
- Hinarap Falls, Barangay Agboy
- Pineapple Farm, Barangay Gatuslao
- Twin Cave, Barangay West
- Kennington Hill Nature Park, Brgy West and Gatuslao
- Mount Tahutay, Barangay Caningay
- Shang Spring Resort, Barangay East
- Tigmaya-Paco Road

=== Zone of Peace ===
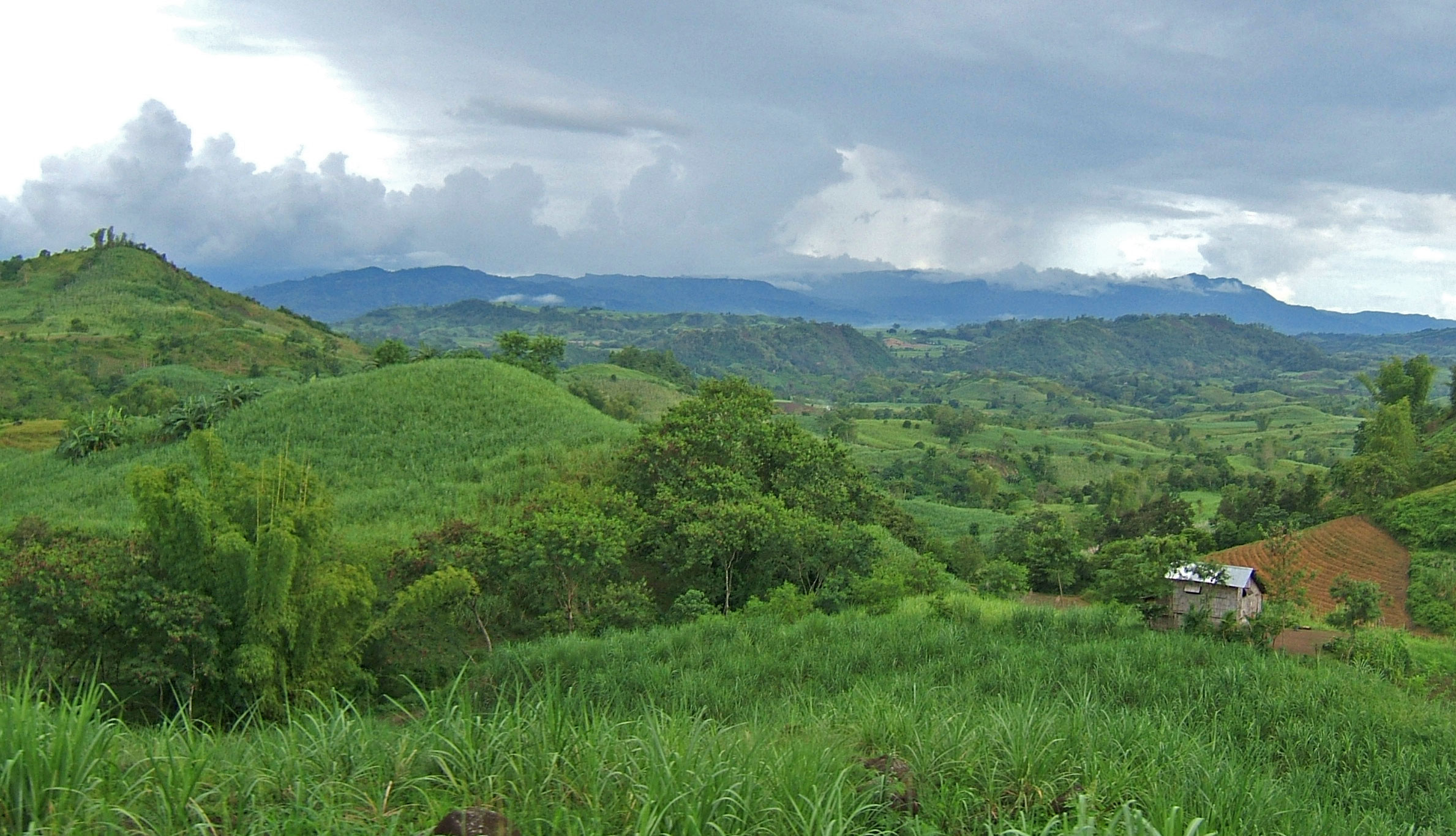
On the road to Candoni, Negros Occidental

The Sitio of Cantomanyog in Barangay Haba was the first Zone of Peace in the Philippines. The Peace Zone culture has had a significant impact on local communities, enabling the people of Cantomanyog to produce cultural expressions such as oral histories, poetry, and music, inspiring neighboring communities to follow suit.

The first armed encounter between the New People’s Army (NPA) and government forces in Southern Negros occurred in September 1971. After learning of NPA bases in the towns of Candoni and Kabankalan, the military deployed troops to suppress the insurgents. The NPA gained support in the remote areas of Southern Negros, where government presence was limited, due in part to its ability to provide swift revolutionary justice and maintain order.

On April 18, 1989, an undetermined number of NPA guerrillas launched a surprise attack on the 7th Infantry Battalion, Alpha Company detachment at Caningay, Candoni. The Caningay raid is considered one of the NPA’s most audacious assaults on a military outpost in the area.

In 1989, on the island of Negros, because of the inhumane conditions in the evacuation centers, nearly 300 persons, most of them were children, died from malnutrition and measles as the result of the U.S.-organized bombing raid, "Operation Thunderbolt" in the municipalities of Candoni, Hino–baan, Ilog, Cauayan, Kabankalan and Sipalay popularly referred to as the CHICKS area. The people of Cantomanyog began to ask themselves, "Why is this war happening here?"

In November 1989, the Area Core Group leaders of the Gagmay'ng Kristiyanong Katilingban of Cantomanyog (GKK) or the Basic Ecclesial Community of Cantomanyog (BEC) after their usual panimbahon (community prayer meeting) discussed the peace zone concept. On December 4, 1989, the Basic Christian Community of Cantomanyog gathered for a General assembly wherein a Resolution to Establish the Zone of Peace was read, passed and approved. Their simple declaration was delivered to both the Armed Forces of the Philippines and the New People's Army. The NPA and the AFP respected the Zone of Peace.

On February 16, 1990, during a worship service and Eucharist, Natividad Epalan, a community leader holding her two-year-old child, read a statement declaring the village of Cantomanyog to be the first "zone of peace" in the Philippines.

"Our village is open to everyone whose intentions are good," she read. "We wish to be free of the danger of weapons of war and death…Therefore, whoever enters this zone of peace should not bring any guns with them."

On 25 May 1993, Senator Rodolfo G. Biazon sponsored a resolution passed by the Senate as Resolution No. 435 urging the Executive Department for the declaration of Cantomanyog and the other six Peace Zones as Special Development Areas. President Ramos, consequently and in cognizance to the Comprehensive Peace Policy, recognized the legitimacy of the said Peace Zones and further declared them as Special Development Areas (SDAs). Each of the seven SDAs was allocated P5,000,000.00 for community development projects through the then National Program for Unification and Development Council now part of the Office of the Presidential Adviser on the Peace Process under the Office of the President.

=== Sit-an Cave ===
Sit-an Cave is a natural marvel that extends about one hundred fifty meters from its entrance to its hindmost part which resembles a church-like cavern with cool natural pool with overflowing water ranging from knee-high to waistline depth that forms an underground stream running along the columns of stalactites that hung like a pendant from its roof.

=== Festivals ===
The Dinagyaw sa Tablas Festival is the annual town fiesta happen every February 7–11 and it is also called Feast of Our Lady of Lourdes. The Dinagyaw sa Tablas Festival aims to project and manifest the spirit of cooperation exerted by the Tablenos when they trail blazed the wilderness of the Tabla Velley and established the Tabla Valley settlement that became the predecessor of Candoni.

Dinagyaw came from the word dagyaw a Hiligaynon term which means a group of people helping each other to perform a specific task.

Aside from the annual town fiesta, Candonians also enjoy from multiple Barangay and community fiestas whole year-round.

== Education ==
Candoni has only one school district, District of Candoni. There are 18 public elementary schools, 3 public secondary schools and 1 private secondary school. During the school year 2015–2016, there are 4,335 elementary pupils, 1,271 public high school students and more or less 500 private high school students.

=== Elementary ===
School ID	School name	Barangay	No. of pupils (SY 2015–2016)
116940	Agboy ES	Agboy	170
116941	Bali ES	Agboy	88
116942	Banga ES	Banga	379
116943	Cabia-an ES	Cabia-an	139
116944	Calamunding ES	Gatuslao	78
116945	Candoni Central ES	Poblacion West	1,281
116947	Cantacson ES	Caningay	90
116948	Cantomanyog ES	Haba	105
180519	Cogon ES	Gatuslao	44
116946	Galicano Temporosa I Memorial ES	Caningay	521
116949	Gatuslao ES	Gatuslao	298
116950	Guinsiliban ES	Payauan	78
116951	Haba ES	Haba	299
180512	Nava ES	Agboy	60
116952	Panacmalan ES	Poblacion East	105
116953	Payauan ES	Payauan	472
116954	Salarongon ES	Haba	89
180514	Soso ES	Gatuslao	45

=== High school ===
School ID	School name	Barangay	No. of students (SY 2015–2016)	Type
302606	Caningay NHS	Caningay	402	Public
302607	Caningay NHS - Banga Ext.	Banga	255	Public
302608	Quirico G. Manzano Memorial NHS	Poblacion West	614	Public
na	Our Lady of Lourdes HS	Poblacion East	no data	Private

There are also two (2) Annex High School Campuses, the Gatuslao Campus under Quirico G. Manzano Memorial NHS and the Payauan Campus under Caningay NHS.

=== Tertiary ===
The Municipal Government of Candoni and Negros Occidental State College of Agriculture (NESCA), now Central Philippines State University (CPSU) entered into a Memorandum of Agreement to install a tertiary school campus. The Central Philippine State University, Candoni Campus currently offers four (4) 4-year course Programs such as Bachelor in Animal Science, Bachelor in Elementary Education, Bachelor in Secondary Education, Bachelor of Science in Agriculture.

== Notable personalities ==
- Leopoldo Serantes – competed at the 1988 Seoul Olympics in the Light Flyweight (-48 kg) division winning the bronze medal
- Romel Oliveros – a super flyweight national boxer
- Elisheba Etabag Manzano – 2007 Gold Medal (Top 1) – Highest Achievement Award for Certified Internal Auditor exam.
- Mary Grace Baloyo – was a First lieutenant in the Philippine Air Force who posthumously received the Philippines' highest military award for courage - the Medal of Valor
