= Kainosite-(Y) =

Kainosite
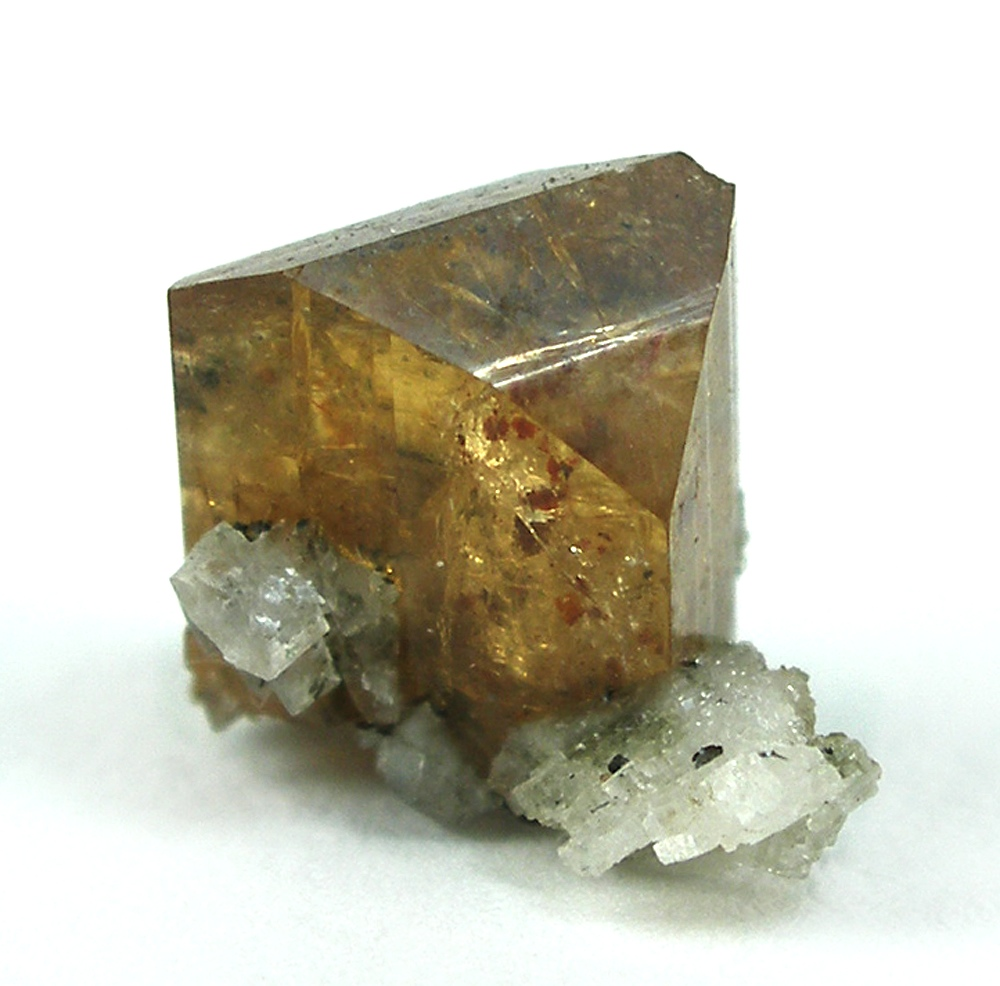

General
- Category: Silicate mineral
- Formula: Ca_{2}(Y,Ce) SiO_{4}O_{12}(CO_{3})•(H_{2}O)
- IMA symbol: Kno-Y
- Crystal system: Orthorhombic
- Crystal class: Dipyramidal (mmm); H-M symbol: (2/m 2/m 2/m)
- Space group: Pmnb

Identification
- Formula mass: 664.14 g/mol
- Colour: Variable, from brown and yellow to colourless
- Cleavage: {110} Good
- Fracture: Brittle and uneven
- Mohs scale hardness: 5–6
- Lustre: vitreous to resinous
- Streak: White
- Diaphaneity: Transparent to translucent
- Optical properties: Biaxial (-)
- Refractive index: nα = 1.662–1.665 nβ = 1.682–1.689 nγ = 1.687–1.692
- Birefringence: Maximum Birefringence: δ = 0.025–0.027
- 2V angle: Measured: 40°, Calculated: 38° to 52°
- Dispersion: strong
- Other characteristics: high relief

Kainosite is a silicate mineral that has the formula of Ca_{2}(Y,Ce) SiO_{4}O_{12}(CO_{3})•(H_{2}O). Kainosite was first discovered in Norway on the island of Hitterø and was named by Adolf Erik Nordenskiöld (1832–1901) in allusion to the Greek word for "unusual" for its rarity and exotic composition.

Kainosite, is part of the orthorhombic crystal class minerals, which is a system that results from stretching a cubic lattice along two of its orthogonal pairs. Kainosite is a biaxial mineral, so the light entering its crystals will be polarized in two vibration directions (XYZ) for it has two optic axes. Because Kainosite is orthorhombic, the vibration directions XYZ coincide with the a,b,c crystallography axes.

Kainosite is very rare and mostly found in Russia in vugs, pegmatites, granites, and alkalic complex as an altered product of the mineral kuliokite. Classic samples have been discovered in Madawaska Mine, Bicroft Mine, and Greyhawk Mine, near Bancroft, Ontario.
