= Arthur H. Shore =

Canadian mine magnate

Arthur Herbert Shore
- Born: 19 May 1893; Campbellford, Ontario
- Died: 10 July 1958 (aged 65); Burks Falls, Ontario
- Occupations: Farmer, Box maker, Dairy farmer, Prospector, Miner.
- Known for: Uranium prospecting and mining

Arthur Herbert Shore (born 19 May 1893) was a mineral prospector and the first person set up a uranium mine in Faraday Township, Ontario. He co-founded and managed the Reeves feldspar Mine and founded the Faraday Uranium Mine. His uranium prospecting, according to Bayne in 1977, led to the "greatest uranium prospecting rush in the world."

== Early life ==
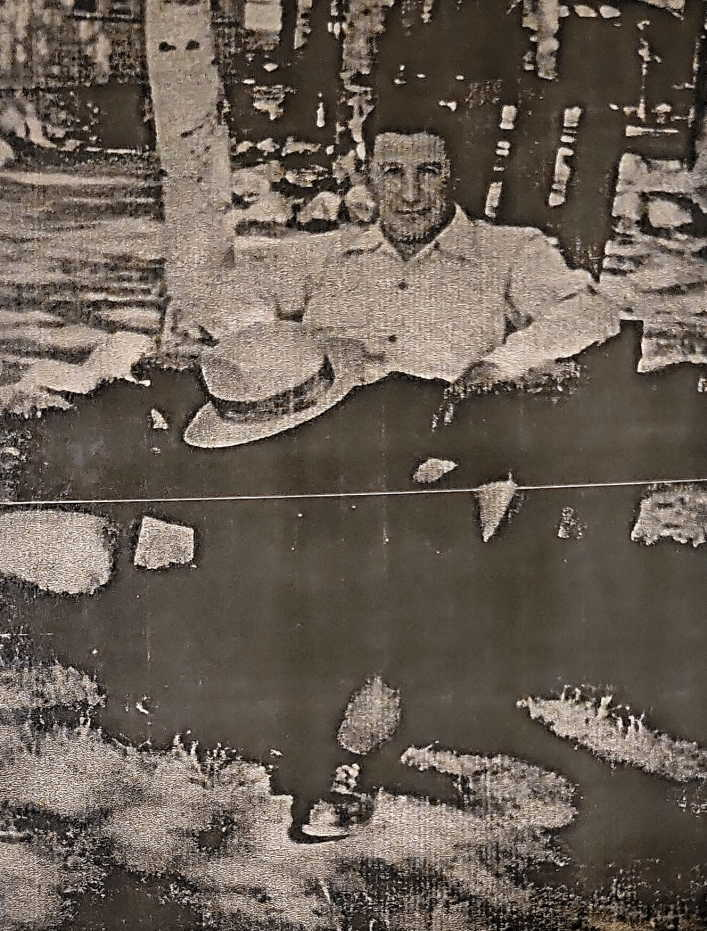

Arthur Herbert Shore was born in Campbellford on 19 May 1893. His parents were Arthur Shore 1865-1937 and Mary Margaret Emiline McNaughton 1865–1910. He was the middle child of five with 4 sisters.

== Career ==
Shore worked in Bancroft as a box maker, as a dairy worker, and as a miner in Cobalt, Ontario.

From 1945 to 1946, Shore was the Managing Director of Bancroft Feldspar Mines Limited, the company that owned and operated Reeves Mine.

In partnership with Roy Munnings, they mined 1,190 tons of feldspar from the mine, which was located at lot 6, Concession XII of Monteagle Township, just north of Bancroft. Shore employed four workers at the mine. After unsuccessfully prospecting many locations nearby Bancroft, and after taking advice from Toronto geologist John C. B. Rogers, in 1948 or 1949, Shore discovered uranium at a lot in Faraday Township. The exact location was lot 15, concession A, a mile from Highway 28, 5 miles south of Bancroft.

Shore used adjacent lots 16 and 17 of Concession 10 to developed a mine.

After buying up the property on surrounding lots, on 22 June 1949, Shore incorporated Faraday Uranium Mines Limited, and appointed himself as president.

Shore attempted to raise funds to develop the property, but was initially unsuccessful as potential investors were discouraged the perception that the geology in Bancroft was incompatible with the economical extraction of uranium.

Shore dug trenches and stripped rock himself, employing geologists and engineers when needed, before seriously injuring himself.

In 1952, Shore received financial support from Toronto-based Newkirk Mining Corporation and work was done by Pole Star Mining.

Shore sold control of the company to Augustus Exploration Limited, who started full development of the site in 1952.

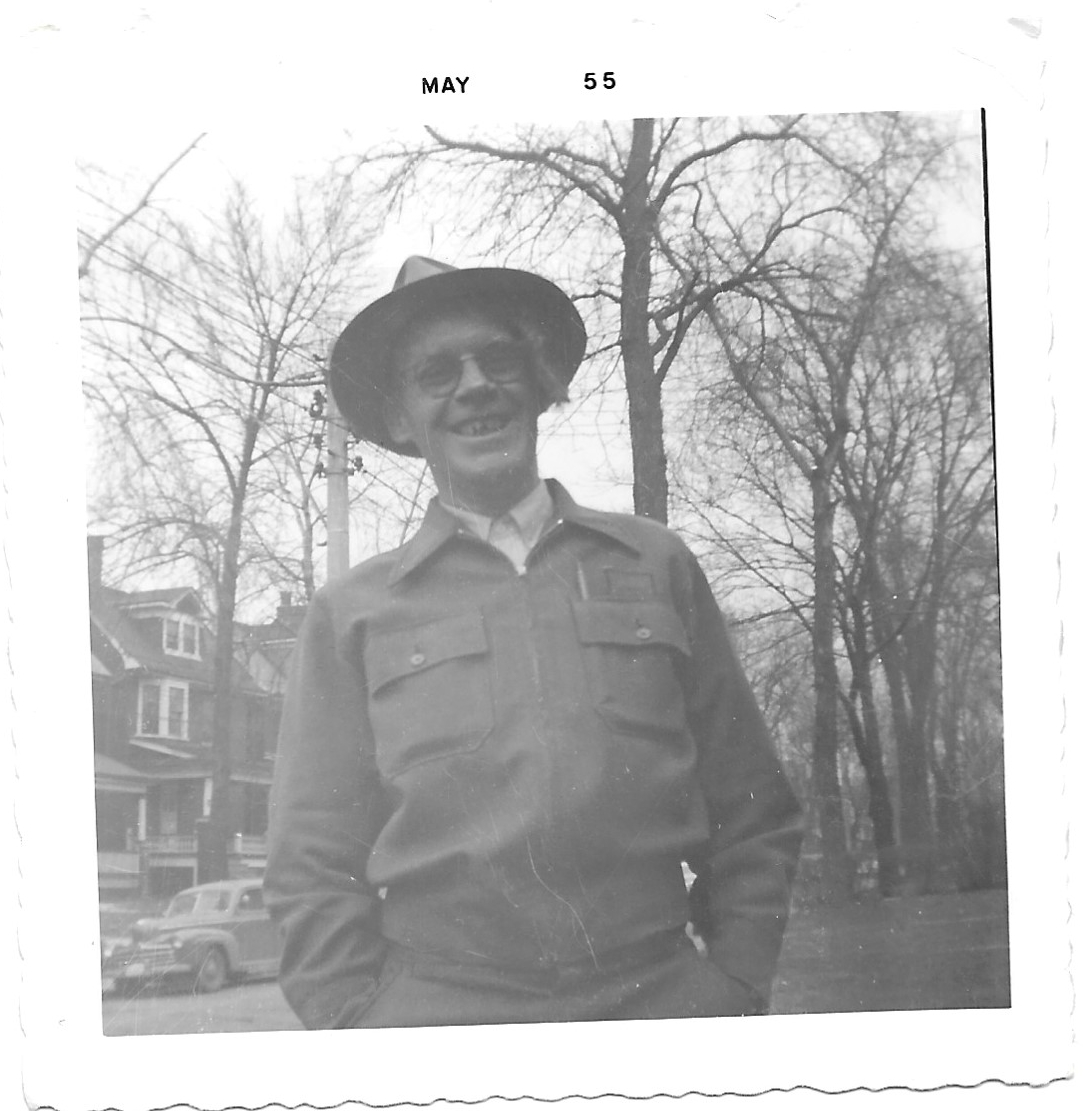

Shore, along with fellow prospectors Bob Thompson and Russ McDonell staked prospects on York River Uranium Mines near Bancroft, in October 1955. Shore discovered uranium mineralization at the Eagle Nest Occurrence, 1.3 km northeast of Bancroft, in 1956. The same year, Shore held shares in Burma Shores Mines Limited, a company incorporated in Toronto that had mineral rights in the plots adjacent to Faraday Mine, in Cardiff, Ontario. The company was dissolved in April 1965.

== Later life and death ==
Shore retired to Trout Creek Nursing Home in Burks Falls after finding out he had cancer. He died 10 July 1958.

== See also ==
- Madawaska Mine
- Uranium mining in the Bancroft area
