= Ontario Highway 802 =

Ontario provincial highway

Highway 802
- Highway 802 Highway 11 concurrency

Route information
- Maintained by Ministry of Transportation of Ontario
- Length: 13.7 km (8.5 mi)
- Existed: April 19, 1962–present

Major junctions
- South end: Burchell Lake
- Highway 11
- North end: Kashabowie railway crossing

Location
- Country: Canada
- Province: Ontario
- Districts: Thunder Bay
- Municipalities: Unorganized Thunder Bay District
- Villages: Kashabowie

Highway system
- Ontario provincial highways; Current; Former; 400-series
← Highway 673	→ Highway 804
Former provincial highways
← Highway 801	Highway 803 →

Tertiary Highway 802, commonly referred to as Highway 802, is a provincially maintained tertiary road in the Canadian province of Ontario, located in Thunder Bay District. The 13.7-kilometre (8.5 mi) route branches both north and south from Highway 11 to connect with the community of Kashabowie and the ghost town of Burchell Lake, respectively. The highway was established in 1962 at the peak of operations of the Burchell Lake mine. Although the mine and town were subsequently abandoned in 1966, the highway remains under provincial jurisdiction. The section that travels concurrently with Highway 11 forms part of the Trans-Canada Highway.

== Route description ==
Highway 802 is a 13.7 km (8.5 mi) route that branches both north and south from Highway 11 approximately 100 km (60 mi) west of Thunder Bay. The north branch travels 1.0 km (0.62 mi) to the community of Kashabowie, ending at a crossing of the Canadian National Railway (CNR). The south branch begins 1.8 km (1.1 mi) to the west of the north branch, and travels 10.9 km (6.8 mi) to the ghost town of Burchell Lake, ending at a locked gate. Highway 11, which forms part of the Trans-Canada Highway, connects the two branches; it is listed as a concurrency with Highway 802. The north branch is also known as Kashabowie Road, while the south branch is known as Burchell Lake Road.

While the Ministry of Transportation is responsible for maintaining Highway 802, the Public Transportation and Highway Improvement Act stipulates that this "does not include the clearing or removal of snow therefrom or the application of chemicals or abrasives to the icy surfaces thereof." Furthermore, the Ministry is "not liable for any damage sustained... using a tertiary road." Traffic levels along the route are low, with approximately 40 vehicles travelling the north branch and 30 vehicles travelling the south branch on an average day in 2016. The speed limit along the north branch is 50 km/h (30 mph), while along the south branch it is 80 km/h (50 mph), as of 2022.

== History ==
Highway 802 follows a road that was originally built in 1901 to link the mineral exploration site at Burchell Lake with the train station at Kashabowie, along the newly-opened CNR (then the Canadian Northern Railway) tracks. The site, where copper was discovered by three prospectors in 1876, quickly grew following the opening of the new transportation link. Fluctuations in the price of copper would result in the closure of the Tip Top Mine following World War I. Interest in the site was renewed in the 1950s, and a town site constructed in 1956. The new mine began full operations extracting copper and gold in 1960, with Burchell Lake boasting a population of almost 400 at its peak.

The Department of Highways, predecessor to the modern Ministry of Transportation, having recently opened up Highway 11 to Atikokan, took over the access road to the mine and to Kashabowie on April 19, 1962, and designated on May 24. However, operations at the mine were short-lived, and it closed permanently on August 5, 1966. Despite this, the southern branch of the highway has remained under provincial jurisdiction.

== Major intersections ==
The following table lists the major junctions along Highway 802, as noted by the Ministry of Transportation of Ontario. The entire route is located in Thunder Bay District.

Location	km	mi	Destinations	Notes
Burchell Lake	0.0	0.0		Highway ends at fence blocking entrance to former mine and ghost town
Thunder Bay District	10.9	6.8	Highway 11 west – Rainy River, Fort Frances	Beginning of Highway 11 concurrency
Thunder Bay District	12.7	7.9	Highway 11 east – Thunder Bay	End of Highway 11 concurrency
Kashabowie	13.7	8.5		Highway ends at CN railway crossing
1.000 mi = 1.609 km; 1.000 km = 0.621 mi
