= Rumina Velshi =

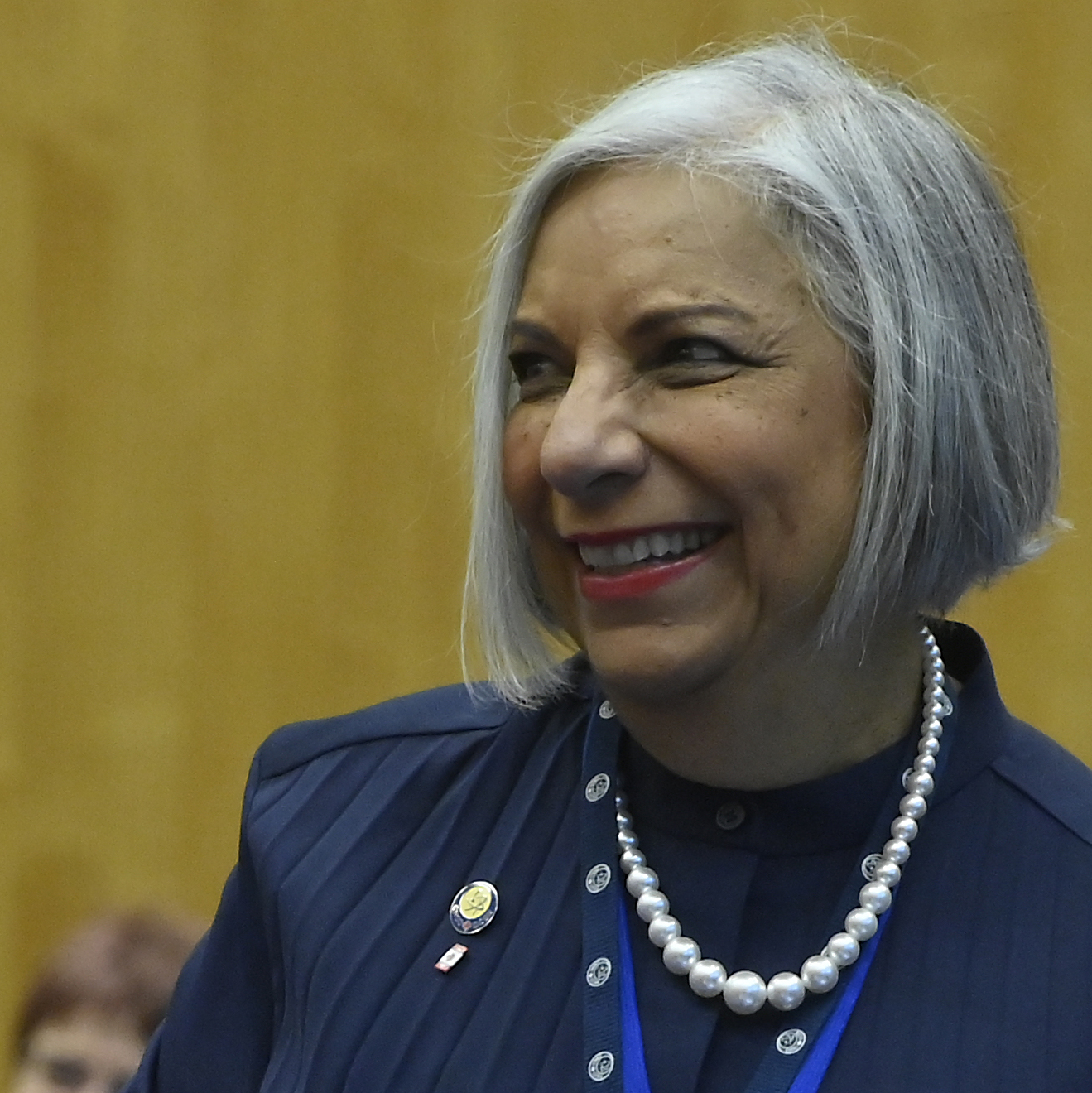
- in 2023
- Born: c.1955 Uganda
- Education: University of Toronto
- Occupation: nuclear engineer

Rumina Velshi (born c.1955) is the former Canadian President and chief executive officer of the Canadian Nuclear Safety Commission (CNSC). She chaired a committee for International Gender Champions. She became a partner in a nuclear company.

== Life ==
Velshi was born in Uganda and she had parents who had Indian heritage. In 1972, Idi Amin who was the president of Uganda decided to eject Ugandan Asians from the country. She and her parents had to leave and they went to Canada. She arrived early in the year and later that year she had to decide on a university course. Velshi has noted that when she was evicted from Uganda she had one significant possession and that was her education. She was a student interested in maths and physics so a course in Engineering beckoned. She liked the description of the Civil Engineering course and she enrolled. During the first lecture she realised that she was one of three women students among about 100 students in the course. She graduated in 1978 and her first job was with Ontario Hydro.

Velshi joined the Canadian Nuclear Safety Commission in 2011. and she won the 2011 Women in Nuclear (WiN) Canada Leadership Award in that year.

In 2018, Velshi became the president and CEO of the CNSC.

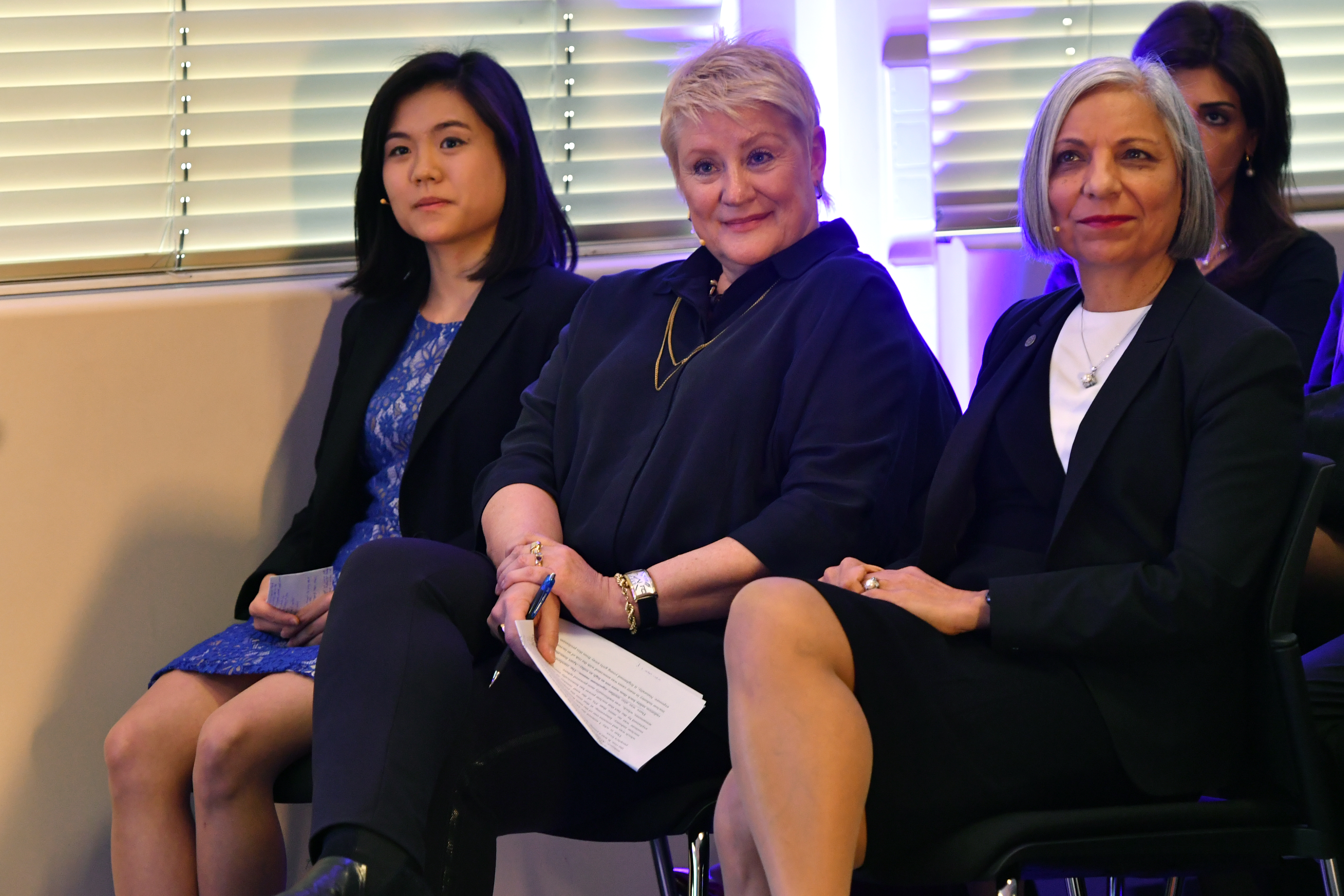
L to R:Amelia Lee Zhi Yi of UN Nuclear Young Generation, Marina Belyaeva, Director of International Cooperation at Rosatom and Velshi on International Women’s Day in 2019

Velshi has been keen to encourage other women to choose a career in a STEM subject. She is the vice-chair of "Scientists in School" which organises opportunities for 700,000 Canadian school children to attend science workshops.

In 2020, she took on an international role for the IAEA becoming their chairperson for their Commission on Safety Standards.

In 2024 she was a partner in ZettaJoule, Inc. who plan to build small nuclear reactors.
