= Kashabowie =

- Compact Rural Community
- Location in Ontario
- Coordinates: 48°39′09″N 90°26′47″W
- Country: Canada
- Province: Ontario
- District: Thunder Bay District
- Elevation: 479 m (1,572 ft)
- Time zone: UTC-6 (Central Time Zone)
  - Summer (DST): UTC-5 (Central Time Zone)
- Postal Code: P0T 1Y0
- Area code: 807
- CGNDB key: FBTDH

Kashabowie is an unincorporated place and Compact Rural Community in southwestern Thunder Bay District in Northwestern Ontario, Canada. It is on the Canadian National Railway Kashabowie Subdivision main line, built originally as the Canadian Northern Railway transcontinental main line, between the Planet flag stop to the west and the Postans flag stop to the east, and has a passing siding.

Kashabowie is located on Ontario Highway 802, 1.1 kilometres (0.68 mi) north of Ontario Highway 11, at the southwest tip of Kashabowie Lake, part of the Kashabowie River system.
