= Wawiag River =

River in Ontario, Canada

Coordinates: 48°25′06″N 91°07′07″W

Wawiag River is a river in Ontario, Canada, that is fed by Mack Creek and Greenwood Creek.

== Description ==
Wawiag River is a glacial river fed by Halet Lake, Burchell Lake, Mack Creek and Greenwood Creek and flows into Kawnipi Lake.

== Wildlife ==
Wildlife on the river includes moose, cougars, wolverines, mooneye, whitefish, walleye, kingbirds, tree swallows, white-winged crossbills, rose-breasted grosbeaks, evening grosbeaks, Cape May warblers, great grey owls and hawk owls. Wild rice grows in the river, and edible berries grow around it.

== History and nomenclature ==
Indigenous peoples have lived around the river's mouth for generations, partly due to the location being a good hunting grounds for caribou. In 1890 the river was known in Ojibwe as Kahwawiagamak River (Gaa-waawiyaagamaag-ziibi), meaning "the round lake's river". There was an 5,948 acres (2,407 ha) Ojibwe reserve at the river mouth, known as the Sturgeon Lake Indian Reserve 24C, created in 1877 and disestablished in 1915.
