= Burchell Lake =

- Ghost town
- Location within Ontario
- Country: Canada
- Province: Ontario
- District: Thunder Bay
- Settled: 1961
- Abandoned: 1967

Population
  - Total: 0
- Time zone: UTC−5 (EST)
  - Summer (DST): UTC−4 (EDT)

Burchell Lake is a ghost town in the Canadian province of Ontario, located behind a locked gate at the southern end of Highway 802 in the Thunder Bay District.

The town existed only from 1959 to 1967, as a company town, owned by North Coldsteam Mines Limited.

== History ==
A copper mining town which was active from 1959 to 1967, the town had approximately 400 residents at its peak. The Burchell Lake area had seen mineral exploration as early as 1902, but active development of large-scale mining operations in the area was not economically feasible until the completion of Highway 11 through the region in 1954. After a mine shaft and mill complex was built, the Coldstream Copper Mines company began building a townsite for its workers in 1959. However, the price of copper had fallen sufficiently by 1967 that the mine was no longer profitable, and the site was shut down in 1967. In less than ten years of operations, workers at Burchell Lake had mined an estimated 102 million pounds of ore.

A number of recreational cottages are still located in the area.

== Existence as a ghost town ==
Easily accessible, Burchell Lake remained one of Ontario's best-preserved ghost towns for many years, with many of its buildings still standing at the townsite as of summer 2011. This included a dozen or so houses (some with basements), the original BA gas station, two room school, and collapsed recreation hall. The baseball cage could also be found with the original scoreboard. Street lamps, a sewer cover, and a fire hydrant also existed. Beginning in 2012 the mine site was remediated by Denison Environmental, with all surface structures demolished, mine openings properly sealed and mine wastes stabilized and covered with biosolids to encourage vegetation growth.

A 40-year community reunion was held in nearby Shebandowan in 2007.

== See also ==
- Coldstream Copper Mine
