= Werner Lake, Ontario =

Coordinates: 50.463°N 94.921°W

Location of Werner Lake in Ontario

Werner Lake is a community in Kenora District, Ontario.
