= Central Philippines State University =

Public university in Negros Occidental, Philippines

- Pamantasang Pampamahalaan ng Gitnang Pilipinas (Filipino)
- Former names: Negros Occidental National Agricultural School (1946–1977); Negros Occidental Agricultural College (1977–2001); Negros State College of Agriculture (2001–2012)
- Motto: "Today is better than yesterday and tomorrow is better than today"
- Type: Public, Nonsectarian, Coeducational higher education institution
- Established: 1946; 80 years ago
- President: Dr. Aladino C. Moraca
- Vice-president: Dr. Marc Alexei Caesar B. Badajos (VP for Finance & Administration); Dr. Grenny I. Jungco (VP for Academic Affairs)
- Location: Kabankalan, Negros Occidental, Philippines (Main); 9°51′04″N 122°53′25″E
- Campus: Main Campus (4,653.7 ha [11,500 acres]); Candoni; Cauayan; Hinigaran; Hinoba-an; Ilog; Moises Padilla; San Carlos; Sipalay; Victorias
- Demonym: Cenphilian
- Website: www.cpsu.edu.ph
- Location in the Visayas Location in the Philippines

Central Philippines State University (CPSU; Filipino: Pamantasang Pampamahalaan ng Gitnang Pilipinas ) is a public higher education institution in the Philippines. Its main campus is located in Kabankalan, Negros Occidental, and has nine other satellite campuses in different cities and municipalities in the province.

== History ==
CPSU started as Negros Occidental Agricultural School (NONAS) and was dubbed as the 1st Agricultural Institution in the country established by a Filipino Superintendent named Jose F. Crisanto immediately after World War II in 1946.

The institution was converted to Negros Occidental Agricultural College (NOAC) by virtue of Presidential Authority on September 6, 1977. NOAC then was converted into state college known as the Negros State College of Agriculture (NSCA) by virtue of R.A. 9141 date July 3, 2001.

By virtue of the Republic Act (R.A.) 10228, NSCA was converted to Central Philippines State University in 2012.

== Academics ==
CPSU has seven colleges:

- College of Agriculture and Forestry
- College of Teacher Education
- College of Arts and Sciences
- College of Hospitality Management
- College of Engineering
- College of Computer Studies
- College of Criminal Justice Education

The university also offers graduate studies leading to a master's degree and a doctorate degree.
