= Nuclear Safety and Control Act =

Canadian law

Parliament of Canada
- Long title: An Act to establish the Canadian Nuclear Safety Commission and to make consequential amendments to other Acts
- Citation: Nuclear Safety and Control Act, (S.C. 1997, c. 9)
- Enacted by: Parliament of Canada
- Assented to: March 20, 1997

The Nuclear Safety and Control Act (French: Loi sur la sûreté et la réglementation nucléaires) is Canada's federal legislation on the regulation of the Canadian nuclear industry.

The Act was developed to be more effective and explicit legislation than the one it replaced, the Atomic Energy Control Act of 1946. The Act also provided for the establishment of the Canadian Nuclear Safety Commission (CNSC), which replaced the Atomic Energy Control Board (AECB).
