= Canadian Nuclear Safety Commission =

Government agency

- Commission canadienne de sûreté nucléaire

Agency overview
- Formed: May 31, 2000; 26 years ago
- Preceding agency: Atomic Energy Control Board
- Jurisdiction: Government of Canada
- Headquarters: Ottawa, Ontario
- Employees: 1,004 (2025)
- Annual budget: $202.4 million (2024–2025)
- Minister responsible: Tim Hodgson, Minister of Energy and Natural Resources
- Agency executive: Pierre Tremblay, President and CEO
- Parent department: Natural Resources Canada
- Key document: Nuclear Safety and Control Act
- Website: www.cnsc-ccsn.gc.ca/eng/

The Canadian Nuclear Safety Commission (CNSC; French: Commission canadienne de sûreté nucléaire) is the federal regulator of nuclear power and materials in Canada.

== Mandate and history ==
Canadian Nuclear Safety Commission was established under the 1997 Nuclear Safety and Control Act with a mandate to regulate nuclear energy, nuclear substances, and relevant equipment in order to reduce and manage the safety, environmental, and national security risks, and to keep Canada in compliance with international legal obligations, such as the Treaty on the Non-Proliferation of Nuclear Weapons. It replaced the former Atomic Energy Control Board (AECB, French: Régie de energie atomique), which was founded in 1946.

The CNSC is an agency of the Government of Canada which reports to the Parliament of Canada through the Minister of Natural Resources.

In 2008, Linda Keen the president and the chief executive officer of the CNSC was fired following a shortage of medical radioisotopes in Canada as a results of the extended routine shutdown of the NRU nuclear reactor at the Chalk River Laboratories. In the same year, the commission created the Canadian Adversary Testing Team (CATT), created for conducting force-on-force exercises involving nuclear power plants.

Rumina Velshi joined the organisation in 2011 and in 2018 she became the president and CEO. In 2020 she also took on an international role for the IAEA, becoming chair of their Commission on Safety Standards with a four year appointment.

== Programs ==
The Participant Funding Program allows the public, Indigenous groups, and other stakeholders to request funding from the CNSC to participate in its regulatory processes.

In 2014, the CNSC launched the Independent Environmental Monitoring Program. The program verifies that the public and environment around licensed nuclear facilities are safe, helping to confirm their regulatory position and decision-making.

== See also ==
- Anti-nuclear movement in Canada
- Canadian National Calibration Reference Centre
- International Nuclear Regulators' Association
- Nuclear industry in Canada
