= Mining in Australia =

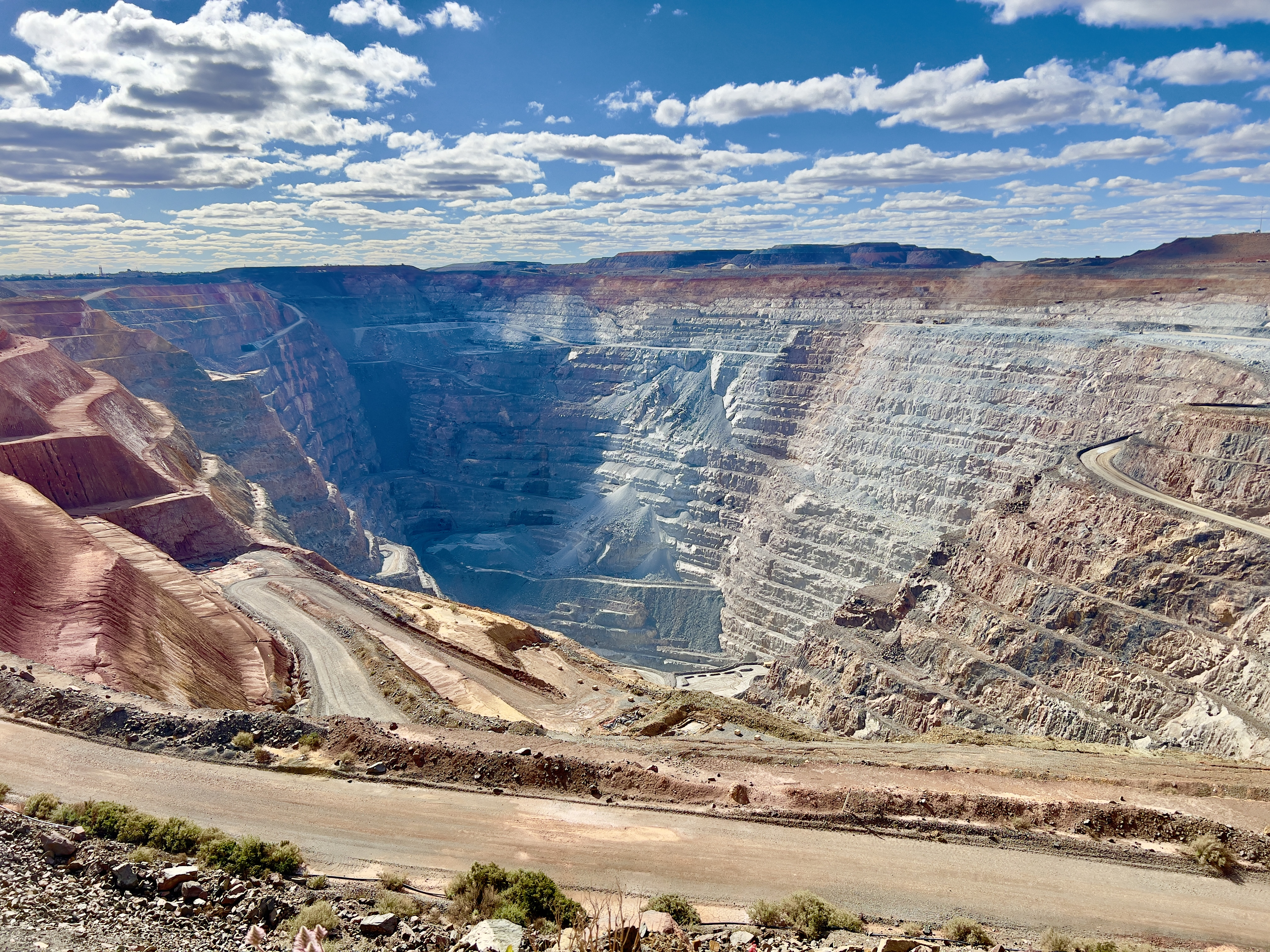
Super Pit gold mine on Kalgoorlie's Golden Mile in Western Australia

Adults employed in the mining industry as a percentage of the adult population in Australia divided geographically by statistical local area, as of the 2011 census

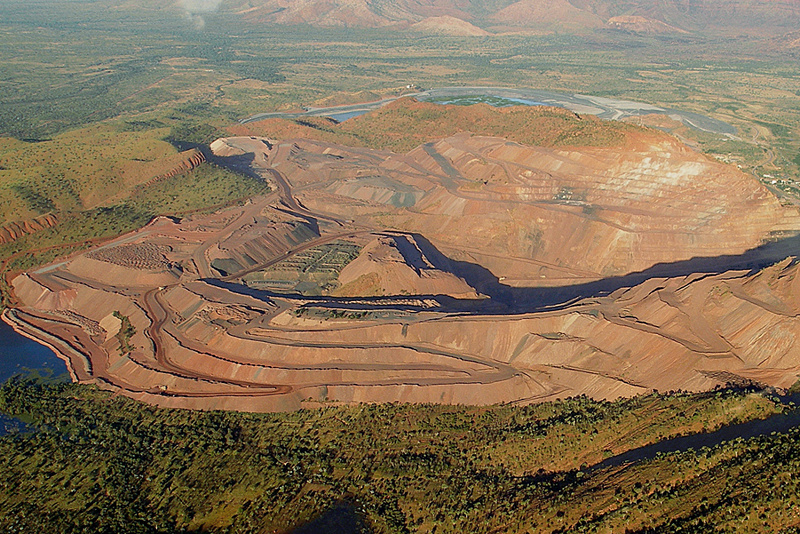
Argyle Diamond Mine, 2007

Mining in Australia has long been a significant primary sector industry and contributor to the Australian economy by providing export income, royalty payments and employment. Historically, mining booms have also encouraged population growth via immigration to Australia, particularly the gold rushes of the 1850s. Many different ores, gems and minerals have been mined in the past and a wide variety are still mined throughout the country.

In 2019, Australia was the world's largest producer of iron ore and bauxite; the second largest of gold, manganese, and lead; the third largest of zinc, cobalt, and uranium; the fifth largest of salt; the sixth largest of copper and nickel; the eighth largest producer of silver and tin; the fourteenth largest of phosphate; and the fifteenth largest of sulfur. The country is also a major producer of precious stones, being the world's largest producer of opal and is also one of the largest producers of diamond, ruby, sapphire and jade.

In non-renewable energies, in 2020, the country was the 30th largest producer of oil in the world, extracting 351.1 thousand barrels/day. In 2019, the country consumed 1 million barrels/day (the 20th largest consumer in the world). The country was the 20th largest oil importer in the world in 2018 (461.9 thousand barrels/day). In 2015, Australia was the 12th largest world producer of natural gas, 67.2 billion m^{3} per year. In 2019, the country was the 22nd largest gas consumer (41.9 billion m^{3} per year) and was the 10th largest gas exporter in the world in 2015: 34.0 billion m^{3} per year. In the production of coal, the country was the 4th largest in the world in 2018: 481.3 million tons. Australia is the 2nd largest coal exporter in the world (387 million tons in 2018)

== History ==
Mining was an important early source of export income in Australian colonies and helped to pay for the imports needed for the growing colonial economies. Silver and later copper were discovered in South Australia in the 1840s, leading to the export of ore and the immigration of skilled miners and smelters. Coal was first exported to India in 1799. By 1901 Australia was exporting several million tonnes of coal each year. After World War II the Bowen Basin was opened up fueling exports to Japan for its growing steel industry.

An iron ore export ban was in place from 1938 to 24 November 1960. In 1965, the first iron ore mine was operated at Goldsworthy in Western Australia. Exports of iron ore began in the 1960s. Iron ore production reached 100 million tonnes by the mid-1970s. This figure doubled to 200 million tonnes in 2003, and tripled by 2013. Western Australia became the largest iron ore producer in the world in 2014. Iron ore reached $100 billion in annual export value in 2020, the first commodity to do so.

The first economic minerals in Australia were silver and lead in February 1841 at Glen Osmond, now a suburb of Adelaide in South Australia. Mines including Wheal Gawler and Wheal Watkins opened soon after. The value of these mines was soon overshadowed by the discovery of copper at Kapunda (1842), Burra (1845) and in the Copper Triangle (Moonta, Kadina and Wallaroo) area at the top of Yorke Peninsula (1861).

A small amount of uranium ore was mined in 1906 from Radium Hill. Uranium deposits at Rum Jungle were developed in the 1950s. The Ranger Uranium Mine was opened in June 1979 and the Olympic Dam mine opened in 1988. The Ranger Uranium Mine was controversial, leading to the Ranger Uranium Environmental Inquiry. Indigenous people of the region were opposed to the mine. Indigenous opposition to the Ranger Uranium Mine influenced environmental assessments and policies.

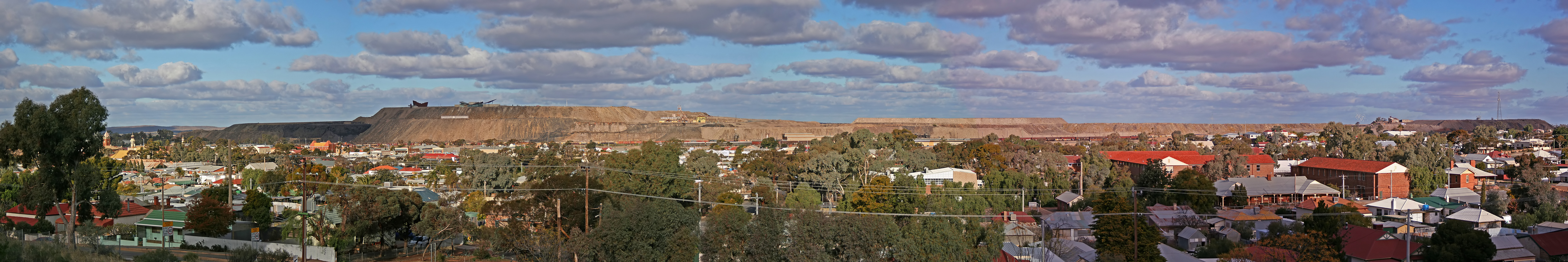
Broken Hill, one of Australia's iconic mining towns, backed by the man-made mullock heaps from the Line of Lode

=== Gold rushes ===
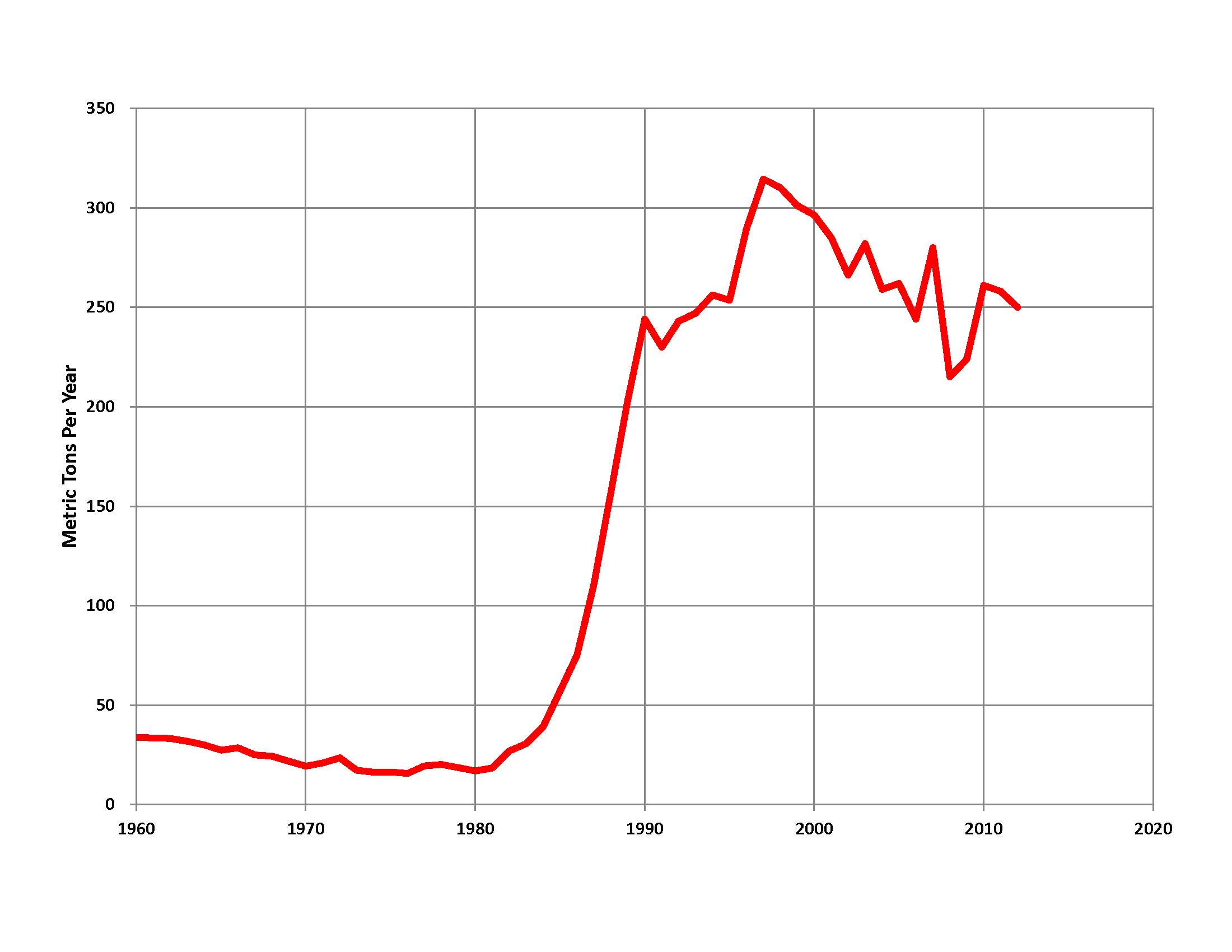
Australia mined gold production, 1960–2012

In 1851, gold was found near Ophir, New South Wales. Weeks later, gold was found in the newly established colony of Victoria. Australian gold rushes, in particular the Victorian gold rush, had a major lasting impact on Victoria, and on Australia as a whole. The influx of wealth that gold brought soon made Victoria Australia's richest colony by far, and Melbourne the continent's largest city. By the middle of the 1850s, 40% of the world's gold was produced in Australia.

Australia's population changed dramatically as a result of the gold rushes: in 1851 the population was 437,655 and a decade later it was 1,151,957; the rapid growth was predominantly a result of the "new chums" (recent immigrants from the United Kingdom and other colonies of the Empire) who contributed the 'rush'. Although most Victorian goldfields were exhausted by the end of the 19th century, and although much of the profit was sent back to the UK, sufficient wealth remained to fund substantial development of industry and infrastructure.

== Location ==
Map of Queensland's major mineral, coal and petroleum operations and resources, 2019

Australia has mining activity in all of its states and territories. The Minerals Council of Australia estimates that 0.02% of Australia's land surface is directly impacted by mining.

Particularly significant areas today include the Goldfields, Peel and Pilbara regions of Western Australia, the Hunter Valley in New South Wales, the Bowen Basin in Queensland and Latrobe Valley in Victoria and various parts of the outback. Places such as Kalgoorlie, Mount Isa, Mount Morgan, Broken Hill and Coober Pedy are known as mining towns.

Major active mines in Australia include:

- Olympic Dam in South Australia, a copper, silver and uranium mine believed to have the world's largest uranium reserve, and in 2018 representing 6% of world production.
- Super Pit gold mine, which has replaced a number of underground mines at Boulder, Western Australia.
- Mount Whaleback mine in Western Australia is the largest open-pit iron ore mine in the world.

== Minerals and resources ==
Australian metal ore and mineral quarterly exports ($A millions) since 1969

Large quantities of minerals and resources :

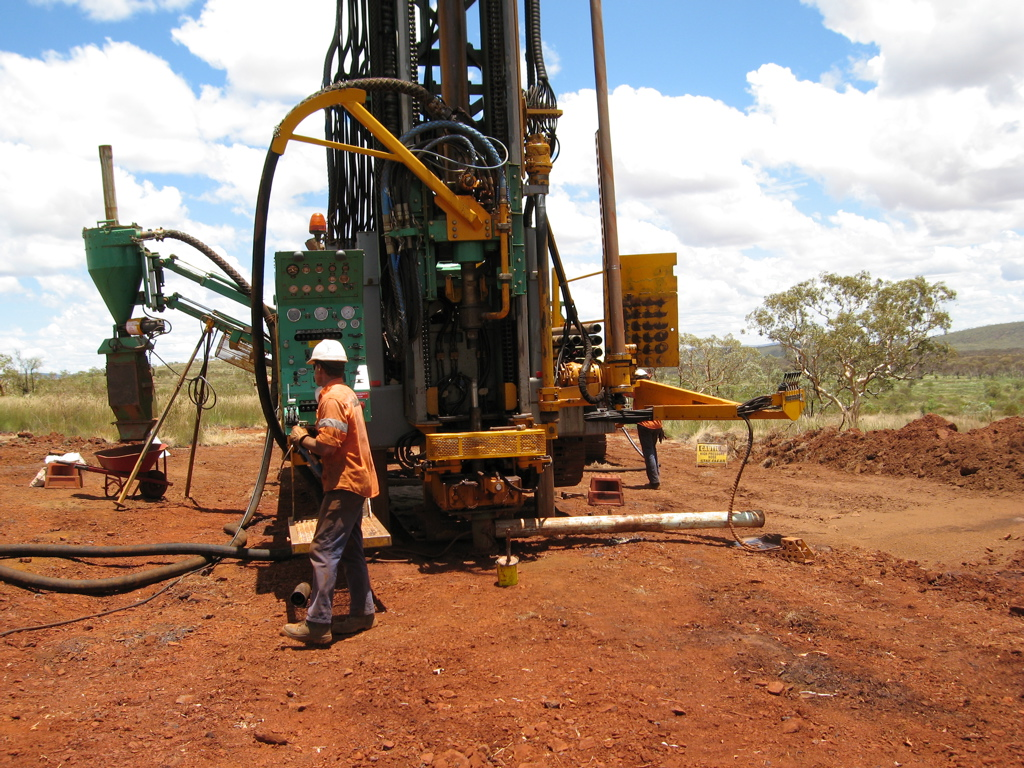
Drilling rig at the Area C iron ore mine, 95 km (59 mi) WNW of Newman, Western Australia

- Iron ore – Australia was the world's largest producer in 2019, supplying 580 million tonnes, 37% of the world's output (39% of the world's contained metal production).
- Nickel – Australia was the world's fifth largest producer in 2019, producing 6.7% of world output.
- Aluminium – Australia was the world's largest producer of bauxite in 2019 (27% of world production), and the second largest producer of alumina (15%), after China.
- Copper – Australia was the world's 6th largest producer in 2019 (5% of world's production).
- Gold – Australia was the second largest producer after China in 2019, producing 330 tonnes (11,000,000 ozt), 10% of the world's output.
- Silver – In 2019 Australia was the sixth largest producer, producing 1,400 tonnes (45,000,000 ozt), 5% of the world's output.
- Uranium – Australia is responsible for 12% of the world's production and was the world's third largest producer in 2018, after Kazakhstan and Canada.
- Diamonds – Australia has the third largest commercially viable deposits after Russia and Botswana.
- Opal – As of 2010 Australia was the world's largest producer of opal, being responsible for 95% of production.
- Zinc – Australia was third to China and Peru in zinc production in 2019, producing 1.3 million tonnes, 10% of world production.
- Coal – Australia is the world's largest exporter of coal and fourth largest producer of coal behind China, US, and India.
- Oil shale – Australia has the sixth largest defined oil shale resources.
- Natural gas – Australia is world's largest exporter of LNG with 77.5 million tonnes in 2019.
- Rare-earth elements – In 2019 Australia was the third largest producer after China and the US, with 10% of the world's output. As per the US Geological Survey's February 2025 report on rare-earth elements, Australia was 4th in terms of reserves, and 4th in terms of production (Myanmar coming in 3rd). The rare-earth industry in Australia is an expanding sector.

Much of the raw material mined in Australia is exported overseas to countries such as China for processing into refined products. Energy and minerals constitute two-thirds of Australia's total exports to China, and more than half of Australia's iron ore exports are to China.

== Statistical chart of Australia's major mineral resources ==
Australia ranks among the top 4 in economic resources for 21 primary industrial minerals, more than any other nation. Statistics are for December 2016.

Units of measurement: t = tonne; kt = kilotonne (1,000 t); Mt = million tonne (1,000,000 t); Mc = million carat (1,000,000 c)

Mineral	Unit of Measurement	Demonstrated Economic Resources	World Ranking of Resources	% of World Resources	Production (2016)	World Ranking of Production	% of World Production	Years of Resources at Current Production Rate
Antimony	kt content	139	4	9	5.5	4	4	25
Bauxite	Mt ore	6,005	2	22	82.15	1	31	73
Coal, Black	Mt	64,045	4	10	566.3	4	7	113
Coal, Brown (lignite)	Mt	66,439	2	24	63.3	5	6	1,050
Cobalt	kt content	1164	2	14	5.47	5	4	213
Copper	Mt content	87.78	2	12	.95	5	5	92
Diamond (industrial)	Mc	115.84	3	18	13.96	2	24	8
Gold	t content	9,800	1	17	288	2	9	34
Iron ore	Mt ore	49,588	1	29	858	1	38	58
Lead	Mt content	24.09	1	40	.45	2	9	54
Lithium	kt content	2,730	3	18	14	1	41	195
Manganese	Mt ore	219	4	13	3.2	4	9	68
Nickel	Mt content	18.5	1	24	.204	5	9	91
Rare Earth Elements	Mt ore	3.43	6	3	.014	2	11	245
Silver	kt content	89.29	2	16	1.42	5	5	63
Tin	kt content	486	4	10	6.64	7	2	73
Titanium (Ilmenite & Rutile)	Mt ore	276.1	2	17	1.7	2	10	162
Tungsten	kt content	391	2	12	.11	12	.40	1,151
Uranium	kt content	1,212	1	29	6.31	3	10	192
Vanadium	kt content	2,111	4	11	0	0	NA	NA
Zinc	Mt content	63.5	1	28	.884	3	7	75
Zircon	Mt ore	72.1	1	67	.60	1	31	120

=== Coal mining ===
Australian coal, coke and briquette quarterly exports ($A millions) since 1969

Coal is mined in every state of Australia except South Australia. Australia is one of the world's major coal producers and exporters, ranking fourth in production (after China, India and the United States) and second in exports (after Indonesia). While most Australian coal is exported, coal was also used to generate 28.7% of Australia's total primary energy supply in 2021.

=== Copper Mining ===
Australia is a significant global producer of copper, ranking as the sixth-largest copper-producing nation in 2023. Major copper operations include Olympic Dam in South Australia and Mount Isa in Queensland. In recent years, there has also been a rise in copper-gold exploration activity by ASX-listed junior companies, particularly in Queensland, including QMines, Carnaby Resources, and Hammer Metals.

=== Uranium mining ===
Uranium mining in Australia began in the early 20th century in South Australia. In 2016, Australia contained 29% of the world's defined uranium resources. The three largest uranium mines in the country are Olympic Dam, Ranger Uranium Mine and Beverley Uranium Mine. Future production is expected from Honeymoon Uranium Mine and the planned Four Mile Uranium Mine.

=== Natural gas ===
Based on 2008 CSIRO report, Australia estimated to have stranded gas reserves with about 140 trillion cubic feet or enough to fulfil the needs of a city with one million people for 2,800 years.

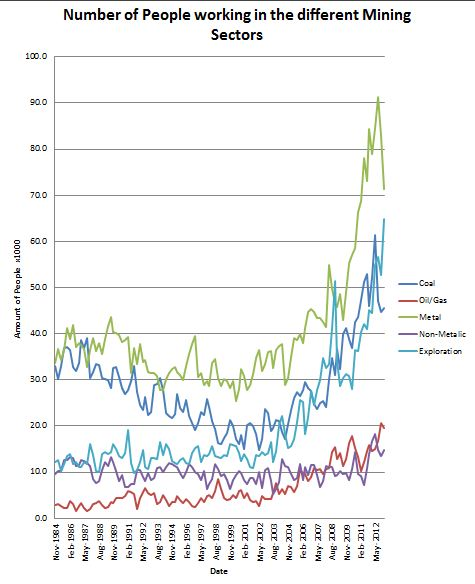
Mining Employment by Sector in 1000s

=== Lithium ===
Australia is the biggest producer of lithium by weight and has the world's largest hard-rock lithium mine, the Greenbushes mine in Western Australia. Lithium mined at Greenbushes accounted for more than 20% of global production in 2021.

== Entrepreneurs and magnates ==
At various stages in the history of the mining industry in Australia, individual mining managers, directors and investors have gained significant wealth and the subsequent publicity. In most cases the individuals are designated Mining Magnates or Australian mining entrepreneurs.

== Economics ==
Total employment in metal ore mining (thousands of people) since 1984

Total employment in coal mining (thousands of people) since 1984

Total employment in oil and gas extraction (thousands of people) since 1984

A number of large multinational mining companies including BHP, Newcrest, Rio Tinto, Alcoa, Chalco, Shenhua, Alcan and Xstrata operate in Australia. There are also many small mining and mineral exploration companies listed on the Australian Securities Exchange (ASX). Overall, the resources sector represents almost 20% of the ASX market by capitalisation, and almost one third of the companies listed.

Mining is Australia's largest sector by share of national Gross Domestic Product, 10.4% in 2020. This is up from only 2.6% in 1950, and from 10% at the time of federation in 1901. In 2020 mineral exports contributed 62% of Australia's total export revenue, valued at $270 billion. Australia is the world's largest exporter of coal (35% of international trade), iron ore, lead, diamonds, rutile, zinc and zirconium, second largest of gold and uranium, and third largest of aluminium. Japan was the major purchaser of Australian mineral exports in the mid-1990s.

Of the developed countries, perhaps only Canada and Norway have mining as such a significant part of the economy; for comparison, in Canada mining represents about 3.6% of the Canadian economy and 32% of exports, and in Norway mining, dominated by petroleum, represents about 19% of GDP and 46% of exports. By comparison, in the United States mining represents only about 1.6% of GDP.

The mining sector employed in 2021 about 270,000 people, about 2.0% of the total labour force.

Australia's mining industry is 86% foreign owned; BHP is 76% foreign owned, and Rio Tinto is 83%. Between them they constitute 70% of listed mining company resources.

Debate continues regarding the distribution of economic benefits from mining activities to Indigenous communities, particularly in resource-rich regions such as the Pilbara. Some commentators argue that, despite the scale of mining revenues, local Aboriginal communities have not experienced proportional economic outcomes. In 2025, Ngarluma Yindjibarndi Foundation CEO Sean-Paul Stephens and Yindjibarndi Elder Kevin Guiness wrote that new models of community-led economic development are required to address these disparities.

== Technology and services ==
Australia's mining services, equipment, and technology exports are over $2 billion annually. Due to the predominance of mining activities in Australia, many technological innovations have been developed or proven in Australian mine sites. These innovations include contributions to autonomous underground vehicles, 3D scanning and printing and underground communications.

Australian engineering companies also contribute to mining equipment reliability through the design, manufacture and re-engineering of components. MASPRO, established in 2006, is an example of an Australian manufacturer specialising in mining equipment components and reliability improvements.

== Environment and politics ==
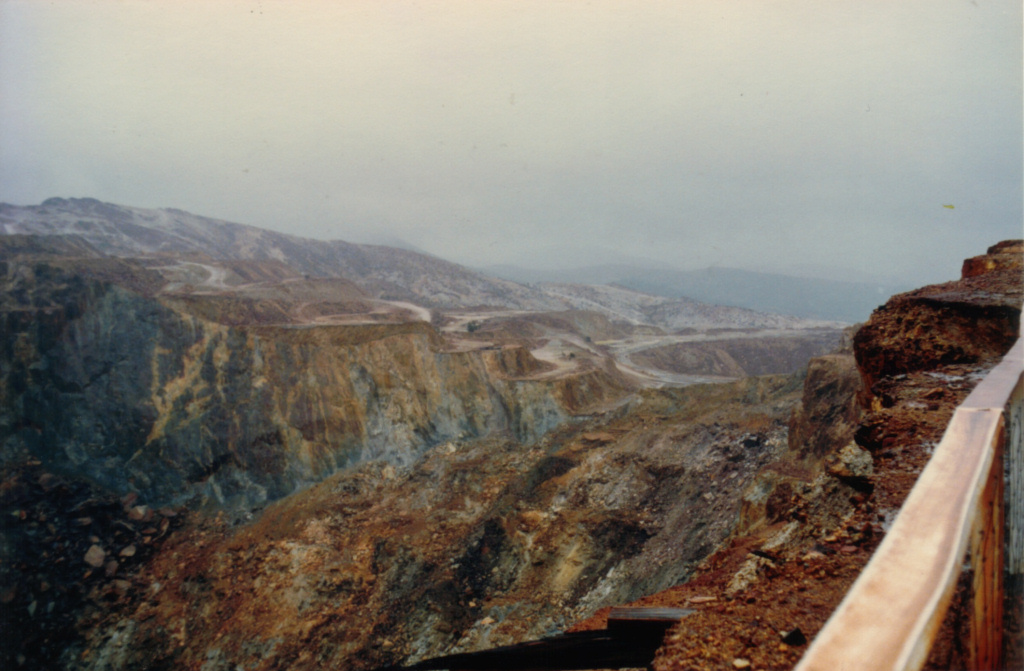
The mountains near Queenstown, Tasmania, completely denuded of vegetation through effects of mining

Australia is the world's third largest exporter of fossil fuel carbon dioxide-emissions potential. “Australia mines about 57 tonnes of CO2 potential per person each year, about 10 times the global average”.

Mining has had a substantial environmental impact in some areas of Australia. Historically, the Victorian gold rush was the start of the economic growth of the country, leading to major increases in population. However, it also resulted in deforestation, consequent erosion, and pollution in the areas that were mined. The effects on the landscape near Bendigo and Ballarat can still be seen today. Queenstown, Tasmania's mountains were also completely denuded through a combination of logging and pollution from a mine smelter, and remain bare today. It is estimated that 10 million hectares of land have been affected throughout the history of mining in Australia. Because Australia's mines are distributed across varying climates the knowledge gained from one mine's restoration does not easily extrapolate to other sites.

Uranium mining has been controversial, partly for its alleged environmental impact but more so because of its end uses in nuclear power and nuclear weapons. The Australian Labor Party, one of Australia's two major parties, maintains a policy of "no new uranium mines". As of 2006, the increased world demand for uranium has seen some pressure, both internally and externally on the ALP, for a policy change. Australia is a participant in international anti-proliferation efforts designed to ensure that no exported uranium is used in nuclear weapons.

During the period of 2010 and 2013, Australia saw a debate about the Minerals Resource Rent Tax (MRRT). The tax, levied on 30% of the "super profits" from the mining of iron ore and coal in Australia. A company was to pay the tax when its annual profits reach $75 million. The controversy regarding the MRRT was such that an "ad war" between the government and mining interests began in May 2010 and continued until the downfall of Prime Minister Kevin Rudd in June 2010. The Australian Electoral Commission released figures indicating mining interests had spent $22 m in campaigning and advertisements in the six weeks prior to the end of the Rudd prime ministership. Mining interests re-introduced the advertisements arguing against the proposed revised changes during the 2010 federal election campaign.

The Coalition, led by Tony Abbott, went to the 2010 and 2013 elections promising to repeal the tax. The Coalition won the 2013 election, and after one failed attempt to pass the bill, the Mining Tax Repeal Bill finally passed both houses of Parliament on 2 September 2014 and the tax was subsequently repealed.

A January 2014 poll conducted by UMR Research, however, found that a majority of Australians still think that multinational mining companies do not pay enough tax.

In the 2017 Western Australian state election The Western Australian National Party led by Brendon Grylls, who retook the leadership in August 2016, ran on a policy to tax BHP and Rio Tinto $5 for every tonne of iron ore mined (as opposed to $0.25 currently). While a poll conducted found that 39.4% of voters surveyed supported the policy, 37.1% opposed and 23.5% were undecided. The big mining companies ran an advertising campaign against the policy.

Grylls was defeated in that election by the Labor candidate.

== Mining disasters ==
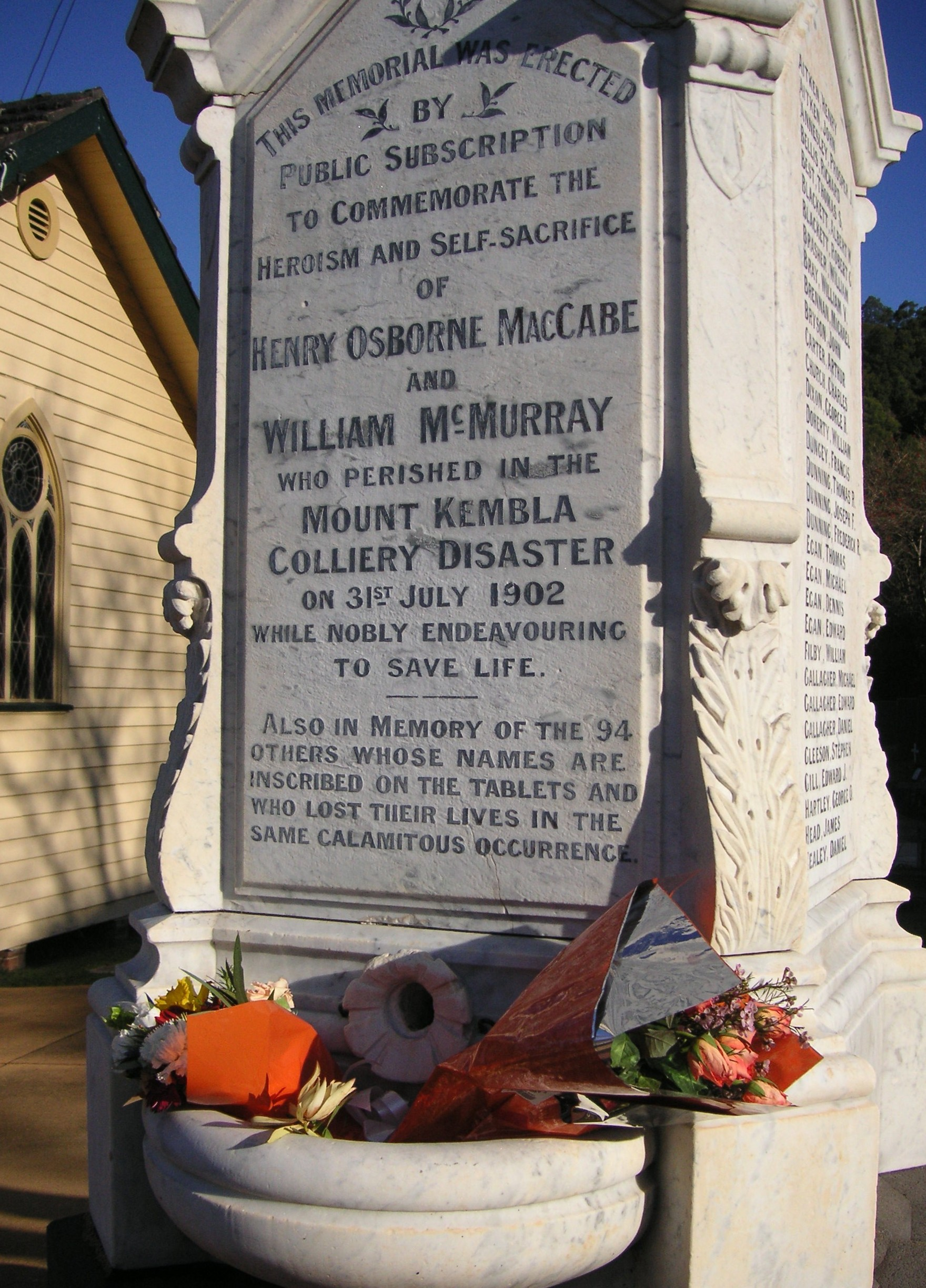
Memorial for the workers who lost their lives at Mount Kembla, in 1902

=== New Australasian Gold Mine ===
Creswick in the Victorian goldfields is the site of the New Australasian No.2 Gold Mine. On 12 December 1882, 29 miners became trapped underground by water that broke through from the adjacent flooded No.1 Gold Mine workings. Only five survived. Despite two days of frantic pumping, water filled the mine workings. The trapped men scrawled last notes to their loved ones on billy cans before they drowned. Some of these have been kept and still bear the messages. The men that perished left 17 widows and 75 dependent children.

=== Mount Kembla Colliery ===
In 1902 a gas explosion in the Mount Kembla Colliery in the Illawarra region of New South Wales resulted in the deaths of 96 men and boys, either while at work or in the course of trying to rescue others. Every family in the village lost a relative. A service of commemoration is held annually on 31 July at the Mount Kembla Soldiers' and Miners' Memorial Church. This was Australia's worst mining disaster.

=== North Mount Lyell ===
On 12 October 1912 at Queenstown, Tasmania the North Mount Lyell Fire caused the death of 42 miners, and required breathing apparatus to be transported from Victoria to rescue trapped miners. The subsequent royal commission was inconclusive as to the cause.

=== Mount Mulligan ===
The 1921 Mount Mulligan mine disaster occurred in Far North Queensland. A coal dust explosion killed 75 men.

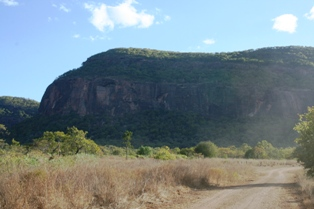
Mount Mulligan in Far North Queensland

=== Moura ===
Four serious accidents have occurred at mines in the Central Queensland town of Moura. The first accident took the lives of 13 men in September 1975. In July 1986 there was an explosion at Moura Number 4 Mine. 12 coal miners lost their lives in this disaster that sparked controversy after experts claimed the accident was avoidable. Another explosion killed two men in January 1994 and just eight months later another explosion deep underground took the lives of 11 men.

=== Bulli Colliery ===
On 23 March 1887 an explosion at the mine in Bulli in New South Wales killed 81 people. A royal commission was set up to investigate the explosion and concluded:

..that the explosion was caused by marsh gas or carburetted hydrogen gas [methane] that had accumulated at the face ... That the immediate cause was probably the flame from an overcharged shot that had apparently been fired by [a miner] in the coal in No. 2 heading.

The gas explosion propagated a coal dust explosion and travelled towards the fresh air at the surface.

The commission was of the opinion that carelessness, want of skill, and the loose and perfunctory manner in which the principal operations in the mine were performed by the majority of the men, and countenanced by at least the overman and deputies, were immediately connected with, and led up to, the occurrence of the final catastrophe, when, by the direct negligence of probably one man, eighty other men lost their lives, and that the mine deputy, the mine overman (foreman) and the mine manager were guilty of contributory negligence.

=== Box Flat Mine ===
At the Box Flat Mine in Swanbank, South East Queensland, 17 miners were lost after an underground gas explosion occurred on 31 July 1972. Another man died later from injuries sustained in the explosion. The mine tunnel mouths were sealed and the mine closed shortly after.

== Australian mining in literature, art and film ==
- Henry Lawson, His Father's Mate from While The Billy Boils, 1896 (short story)
- Nickel Queen, based on the Western Australian nickel boom of the late 1960s
- Colin Thiele, The Fire in the Stone (book which became a film)
- Wendy Richardson, Windy Gully 1989 Currency Press (play)
- Conal Fitzpatrick, Kembla- The Book of Voices 2002 Kemblawarra Press (poetry) ISBN 0-9581287-0-7
- Henry Handel Richardson, The Fortunes of Richard Mahony: Australia Felix Takes place in the chaos of the early Ballarat goldrush.
- Richard Lowenstein, Strikebound (1984 film).
- Tim Burstall, The Last of the Knucklemen (1979 film, based on the play by John Power, who also wrote a novelisation of the film).
- Kriv Stenders, Red Dog (2011 film, based on the true story)
- Franklin White. Miner with a Heart of Gold: biography of a mineral science and engineering educator. 2020. Friesen Press. ISBN 978-1-5255-7765-9 (Hardcover) 978-1-5255-7766-6 (Paperback) 978-1-5255-7767-3 (eBook)

== See also ==
- List of mines in Australia
- Mining in the Northern Territory
- Mining in Western Australia
- NSW Minerals Council
- Rare-earth industry in Australia
- Uranium mining controversy in Kakadu National Park
