= Uranium in Western Australia =

Western Australia has considerable resources of uranium, but to date there has been no commercial mining in the state.

== Mining proposals ==
Quarterly expenditure ($millions) on exploration for uranium in Western Australia since 1988

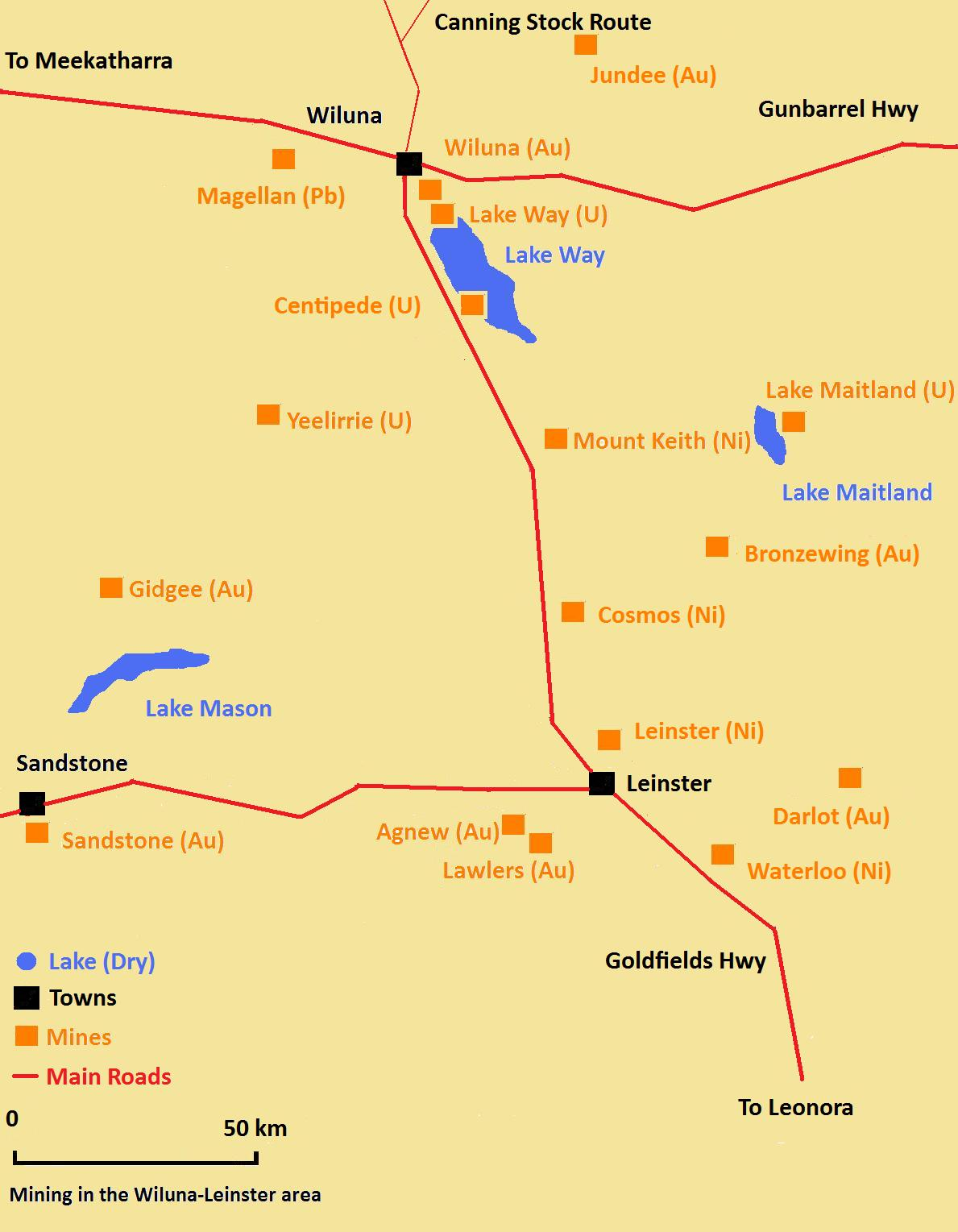
Mining in the Wiluna-Leinster area

Two uranium mining projects in the state are closer to production, the 750 tonne U_{3}O_{8} Lake Maitland project, pursued by Mega Uranium, and the 680 tonne U_{3}O_{8} Centipede–Lake Way project undertaken by Toro Energy, located at Lake Way.

=== Deposits ===
Major development projects include:

- Yeelirrie, Wiluna (Cameco)
- Kintyre, Telfer (Cameco and Mitsubishi Corp)
- Mulga Rock, Pinjin (Vimy Resources)
- Lake Way - Wiluna (Toro Energy)
- Lake Maitland, Wiluna (Toro Energy)
- Nyang, Learmonth (Paladin Energy)
- Manyingee, Onslow (Paladin Energy)
- Oobagooma, Derby (Marenica Energy)
- Dawson Hinkler Well, Wiluna (Toro Energy)
- Thatcher Soak (Marenica Energy)
- Hillview, Meekatharra (Encounter)

=== Public opposition ===
There has been some opposition to uranium and nuclear industries in WA, especially since the 2011 Fukushima nuclear disaster, including anti-uranium campaigns from the Conservation Council of Western Australia, Nuclear-Free Alliance, and the Anti-Nuclear Alliance. In the past WA Greens leader Giz Watson and Labor MP Sally Talbot have spoken out against uranium mining, nuclear power and radioactive waste disposal in WA.

== See also ==
- List of uranium projects
- Uranium mining in Australia
- Anti-nuclear movement in Australia
