= Yeelirrie =

Yeelirrie may refer to:

- Yeelirrie Station, a pastoral station in Western Australia
- Yeelirrie uranium project, a uranium deposit on the site of the station
