= Four Mile uranium mine =

Mine in South Australia

Four Mile Mine
- Location in Australia
- Location: Lake Frome, South Australia, Australia; 30°08′48.6″S 139°30′23.9″E
- Products: Uranium
- Opened: 2014
- Company: Quasar Resources Pty Ltd
- Website: Quasar Resources; Alliance Resources
- Acquired: 2005 (Discovery)

Four Mile is Australia's fifth uranium mine. It is sited in the Frome Basin in far north of the state of South Australia, around 600 kilometres (370 mi) north of the state capital, Adelaide. It is 10 kilometres (6 mi) from the existing Beverley uranium mine, where its uranium oxide product is produced. Construction of the mine commenced in late 2013 and the mine was officially opened in June 2014.

Prior to opening, it was claimed that Four Mile would become the tenth-largest uranium mine in the world.

== Mine ==
Four Mile is the fifth uranium mine in Australia. The deposit was first discovered in 2005 and is the largest uranium discovery in Australia since 1990. In June 2009, Alliance Resources announced that the deposit contained 28,000 tonnes (31,000 short tons) of uranium oxide and the ore was graded at ten times that of Olympic Dam mine and double that of the Ranger mine in the Northern Territory. The mine life is expected to be at least 15 years.

The mine began as a joint venture between Quasar Resources Pty Ltd, who owned 75 per cent of the project and Alliance Resources Ltd, who owned the remaining 25 per cent. Quasar Resources is affiliated with Heathgate Resources Pty Ltd, owner and operator of the nearby Beverley mine and processing plant where the liquor from the mine is treated to extract the uranium.

The mine uses an in-situ leach process, which involves pumping a weak acid solution into the formation to dissolve the uranium-bearing ore. The ore-bearing solution is then pumped to the surface for extraction and treatment. This method was chosen to allow the mine to commence operations relatively quickly.

The developers of the mine originally planned for the mine to be operational in the first quarter of 2010 and stated that it would produce 1,400 tonnes (1,500 short tons) of uranium oxide per year. However, ongoing legal disputes between the joint venture partners led to delays.

The mine was officially opened by the South Australian Premier Jay Weatherill and Treasurer Tom Koutsantonis on 28 June 2014.

In September 2015, the sale of Alliance's stake in the mine was completed, transferring full ownership to Quasar Resources.

== Approval ==
Approval for the mine was granted by the Australian Minister for the Environment, Heritage and the Arts. Peter Garrett, on 14 July 2009; the first such mine approved by an Australian Labor Party (ALP) government since the abolition of its "three-mine policy" on uranium mines at the party national conference in 2007. Announcing the decision, Minister Garrett stated he was "certain this operation poses no credible risk to the environment". The approval was supported by South Australian Premier Mike Rann.

The decision to approve the mine was supported by the Australian Uranium Association (AUA). The executive director of the AUA claimed to be "heartened" by the decision, saying that the decision "tells [the industry] that if we continue to meet those high environmental standards, which the (Environment) Minister himself applies, then we will be able to continue to expand". The Australian Workers' Union also supported the decision with national secretary Paul Howes saying it "represents a significant win for Australia's resource industry" and that it will "[provide] revenue for that state's coffers and opportunities to create good, well-paid Australian jobs."

Opposition to the proposal was voiced by the Australian Conservation Foundation (ACF) who are concerned that the decision represents a relaxation of environmental standards. The ACF have specifically raised their concerns about possible contamination of groundwater from mine operations. A traditional owner from the Adnyamathanha people has also expressed unhappiness with the approval, comparing it to the "stolen generation" practises of past Australian governments.

The Government of South Australia provided the project with State environmental approval in August 2013.

== See also ==
- Uranium mining in Australia
- List of uranium mines
- Sandstone uranium deposits
