= Three-mine policy =

Former Australian government policy

The three-mine policy, introduced in 1984 and abandoned in 1996, was a policy of the government of Australia to limit the number of uranium mines in the country to three.

== History ==
The foundations of the three-mine policy for uranium mining were laid in 1982, when, at a conference of the Australian Labor Party, the party decided to adopt a "no new mines" policy. At the time, two uranium mines were operating, both in the Northern Territory, Ranger and Nabarlek. However, this new policy left a loophole, as it permitted uranium to be mined as a by-product of other mining operations. The later exception allowed for development of the Olympic Dam mine, located in South Australia, as it also contained gold and copper.

The following year, 1983, Labor won the federal elections and came into power for the first time since 1975.

The three-mine policy was officially introduced in 1984, after the federal elections that year had confirmed Bob Hawke of the Labor Party as Prime Minister of Australia. The policy restricted uranium mining in Australia to three existing mines, Ranger, Nabarlek and Olympic Dam.

The policy was abandoned in 1996, after the 1996 federal election replaced the Labor Party with John Howard's Coalition in power. The new policy was to develop the country's uranium mining industry and uranium exports.

The Australian Labor Party changed back its policy in the 1990s to a "no new mines" policy to allow uranium mines already approved by the Coalition government to go ahead. With the opening of a fourth uranium mine in Australia in 2001, the Beverley uranium mine, and the approval of a fifth mine, the Honeymoon uranium mine, Labor's stand had essentially become a "five-mine policy", as Nabarlek had since been closed.

The Labor Party, however, continued its opposition to increased uranium mining until 2006, when, under the leadership of Kim Beazley, discussions to abandon the "no new mines" policy were initiated. In April 2007, the Labor party, under the new leadership of Kevin Rudd voted at their national conference to abandon the policy. The vote was only won by a narrow margin- 205 to 190, and heavy internal criticism resulted. Ministers Peter Garrett and Anthony Albanese remained outspokenly opposed to the decision due to the unresolved problems of nuclear waste storage and nuclear weapons proliferation.

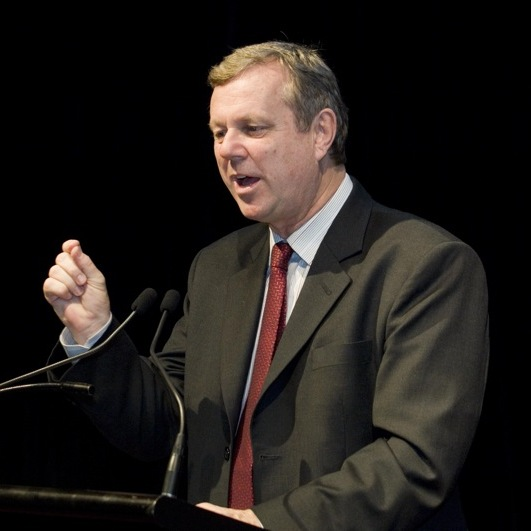
Premier Mike Rann

== South Australia ==
South Australia's Premier Mike Rann and treasurer Kevin Foley had lobbied the Federal government to abandon the policy, and Rann reflected on this during his opening address at the 2010 AusIMM International Uranium Conference. Of the Rann government's role, he said:

"Our support for the exploration and mining of uranium can also be seen in the role we played in having the ALP overturn its "no new uranium mines" policy in 2007. I have to say, it was one of the more difficult tasks that I've been given over the years, but I personally campaigned strongly for that out-dated and illogical policy to be discarded and it has been. It's gone now, for all time."

South Australian Liberal party Senator Nick Minchin supported the lobbying efforts of the Rann government, saying:

"We of course welcome Mr Rann's advocacy of getting rid of one of the most stupid policies the federal Labor Party has ever had."

At a working dinner of the South Australian Minerals & Petroleum Expert Group (SAMPEG), the opening address by the Minister for Mineral Resources Development Paul Holloway responded to the result of the vote. It was recorded in the meeting's minutes thus:

"The narrow vote in the recent scrapping of the no new mines policy made apparent the amount of ignorance there is present regarding uranium. It will now be a challenge for the SAMPEG group to address the lack of knowledge in both the public and government... SAMPEG can now make sure the world is aware that South Australia is open for business in regards to uranium."

At the same meeting, the SAMPEG Chair Dr Ian Gould spoke on uranium. The minutes reflect:

"SAMPEG should consider that the public doesn't understand the industry and members could directly contribute to the continued enhancement of resources information in this state. Information has never been presented in relatively simple terms to the public. A lot of people at a Ministerial level still don't understand uranium. As a group, SAMPEG could play a role in talking to colleagues of Minister Holloway about the uranium business. This could lead to converting those at a Minister level to become ambassadors themselves. The more ambassadors we can bring on board the better off the industry will be."

The abolition of the "no new mines" policy allowed the development of the Honeymoon and Four Mile in-situ leach uranium mines, which officially commenced production in 2011 and 2014 respectively.

== State-based uranium mining bans ==
Individual states continued their ban on uranium mining, however, with Western Australia lifting its six-year-old ban in 2008 after state elections, which saw the Labor Party replaced in government by the Liberal Party. Queensland continues to impose a ban on uranium mining but trade unions have advocated the end of the ban in the hope of uranium mining creating more jobs. Uranium mining remains banned in Victoria and New South Wales, though exploration for uranium is permitted in the latter. Uranium mining is permitted in Tasmania, but no uranium mines have been established there.

== See also ==
- Nuclear power in Australia
