= Uranium mining in Australia =

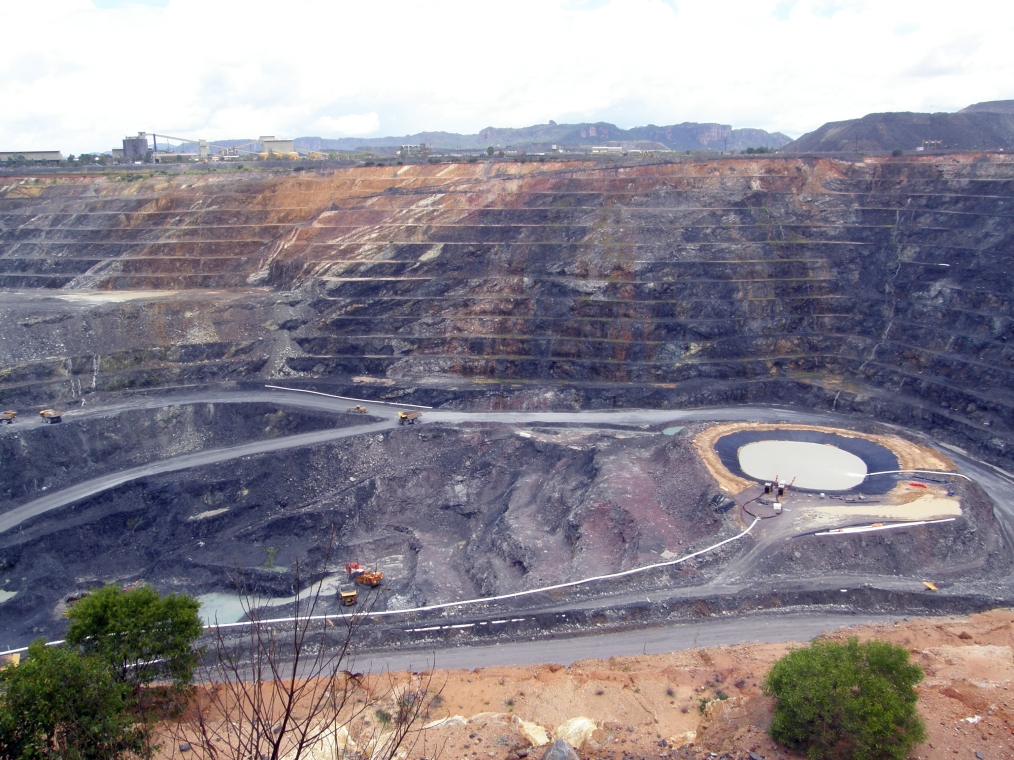
Ranger Uranium Mine, Number 3 pit

Quarterly expenditure ($millions) on uranium exploration since 1988

Annual Australian production of uranium (thousand tonnes) since 1989

Radioactive ores were first extracted in South Australia at Radium Hill in 1906 and Mount Painter in 1911. 2,000 tons of ore were treated to recover radium for medical use. Several hundred kilograms of uranium were also produced for use in ceramic glazes.

In 2019 Australia exported 6,613 tonnes (15 million pounds) of uranium, 12% of world production, for use in nuclear power generation. IAEA and the OECD's NEA reported that the price of uranium in 2019 was $130/kg, and estimated that 35% of the world's uranium resource reserves was in Australia (1,748,100 tonnes out of 4,971,400 tonnes). In terms of production, Kazakhstan is the largest supplier, followed by Canada and Australia.

Following the Japanese Fukushima nuclear disaster in early 2011, many countries scaled back their nuclear power production, with some setting deadlines for a complete shutdown of all nuclear power reactors, with a resultant impact on demand for uranium. As of 2013 uranium prices have been very low. New mine developments have received State government approval in Western Australia and Queensland, although it is unlikely that new projects will enter active development until the uranium market price improves.

For several decades uranium mining has been a major part of the Australian political discussion, with opposition groups citing the wide-ranging environmental impacts, indigenous land access and nuclear proliferation as reasons for ceasing or restricting the industry. The debate has resulted in limitations on mining and export activities, with Federal and State governments occasionally backflipping on public policy.

As of 2017, there were three operational uranium mine sites: Olympic Dam (BHP), Ranger (Energy Resources of Australia), and Beverley Four Mile (Heathgate Resources).

== History ==
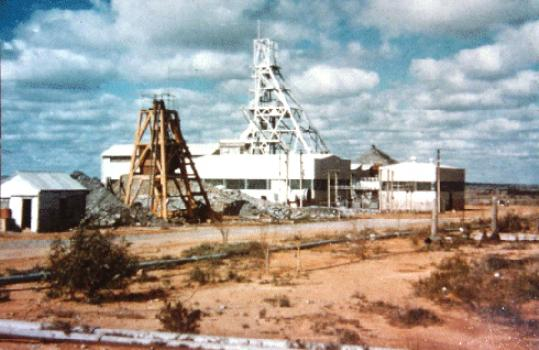
Radium Hill minesite c.1954

=== 1906–1915 ===
The occurrence of uranium in Australia had been known since 1890 in South Australia, six years before the discovery of its radioactivity, which generated great interest in the mineral.

Uranium was produced as a by-product of radium mining in South Australia after Arthur J. Smith made a claim in March 1906 at a spot 460 km (290 mi) northeast Adelaide and 110 km (68 mi) southwest of Broken Hill, New South Wales. It was first known as Smith's Carnotite Mine and later Radium Hill.

Radium ore was also produced at Mount Painter (Radium Ridge), South Australia, after a find by G.A. Greenwood and identification by Douglas Mawson in 1910. This led to extraction of radium by the Radium Extraction Company of South Australia Ltd, which opened several other deposits during the following two years. The largest of these was the No. 6 workings near Mt Painter, which was opened in 1911. Ore was shipped to Europe until the advent of World War I in 1914, and the company went into liquidation in 1917. Mawson had some uranium from the region shipped to Marie Curie, who was then involved in radioactivity research in France.

Both the Mount Painter and Radium Hill deposits were mined intermittently for medical use until the early 1930s, when mining ceased. Interest in uranium itself only increased after the discovery of nuclear fission in 1939.

A refinery at Hunters Hill, New South Wales, processed the ore between 1911 and 1915 for radium bromide and uranium. The radium was used for medical research and the uranium used in ceramic and glass manufacture.

=== 1944–present ===
In 1944 exploration resumed at both Mount Painter (at the new East Painter Camp), Radium Hill, and other sites, for potential use in allied nuclear weapons projects after requests from the United States and United Kingdom governments. In 1948 tax concessions were offered by the Commonwealth for successful discoveries. A £1.8 million uranium treatment complex operated by the Government of South Australia at Port Pirie commenced operations in August 1955, processing ore from Radium Hill and Wild Dog Hill (Myponga), south of Adelaide. The complex supplied the UK-US Combined Development Agency and closed in February 1962.

The East Painter Camp closed in 1950. Uranium deposits were found at Rum Jungle (NT) in 1949 and a mining operation run by the Commonwealth government commenced there in 1954. Further discoveries were made at South Alligator River (NT) in 1953, Mary Kathleen (Qld) in 1954, and Westmoreland (Qld) in 1956. In 1954 Radium Hill reopened as a uranium mine, and mining operations started at other sites in the late 1950s, including El Sherana, Coronation Hill, and Palette.

By 1964, production had mostly ended, due to depleted reserves and filled contracts. Export sales during this initial phase included 7,730 tonnes of uranium to the US and UK for their nuclear weapons programs. Much of the sales related to the power generation in overseas countries.

A second wave of exploration activity in the late 1960s occurred with the development of nuclear energy for electricity production. 60 deposits had been identified up to the late 1970s. The Ranger deposit was discovered in 1969, Nabarlek and Koongarra in 1970, and Jabiluka in 1971.

Between 1968 and 1971, a consortium of mining companies discovered further uranium deposits at Mount Painter, including the Hodgkinson Project.

Australia was part of the 1972-1976 uranium producers cartel, Societe d'Etudes de Recherches d'Uranium. The other cartel members were France, South Africa, and Anglo-Australian transnational Rio Tinto Zinc Ltd. It was formed by the major non-US uranium producers to mitigate the impacts of US policy on the uranium market; to do so, the cartel engaged in bid rigging, price fixing, and market sharing. Westinghouse filed an antitrust lawsuit against cartel members in 1976 and the cartel disbanded.

The first of many government inquiries into the industry was tabled in 1976 as the "Ranger Uranium Environmental Inquiry" (also known as the "Fox Report"), and addressed the question of whether Australia should mine and export uranium. Mining operations ceased while the inquiry was underway but recommenced in 1977 after the government took up a 42% share of Ranger Uranium Mines. In 1979 the Commonwealth sold its share in the still to be built Ranger operation and at the same time established Energy Resources of Australia to own and operate the mine. Ranger finally opened for production in 1981. The mine continued to operate until January 2021 and is now marked for remediation.

The Nabarlek (NT) mine operated for four months in 1979. Milling of stockpiled ore commenced in 1980 and produced 10,858 tonnes of uranium oxide up to 1988 with sales to Japan, Finland, and France, for civil power generation.

Mary Kathleen closed in late 1982, becoming the site of Australia's first major uranium mine site rehabilitation project. This was completed in 1985. A similar site rehabilitation project at Rum Jungle also took place in the 1980s.

The Olympic Dam mine at Roxby Downs started operations in 1988, operated by Western Mining Corporation. A large underground mine, it was mainly focussed on copper production, with uranium, gold, and silver as by-products. Western Mining Corporation was taken over by BHP Billiton in 2005.

Historically, many prospective Australian uranium mines have been constrained by active antinuclear opposition, but state governments have now approved mine development in Western Australia and Queensland. As of 2013 uranium prices were very low. Cameco placed the Kintyre project on hold until market prices improve and Paladin stated that its project proposals (Bigrlyi, Angela/Pamela, Manyingee, Oobagooma, and Valhalla/Skal) needed higher uranium market prices before they can proceed. Toro wanted to take the Wiluna proposal to the development phase, but had not been successful in attracting equity investors. If and when market prices rise again, so that mine development is justified, most projects would need at least five years to proceed to production.

== Map ==
Major uranium mines and deposits in Australia

Active mine Deposit/possible future minesite Closed mines/plants City/town

(May 2009)

== Markets ==
Generally, there is only one commercial use for uranium: as the source material for nuclear power generation. In February 2009 there were 436 operational nuclear power plants worldwide, with a total generating capacity of nearly 372 gigawatts of electricity. Another 64 nuclear power reactors are expected to be commissioned over the next six years.

There are no nuclear power generation plants operating in Australia and therefore no domestic demand. The High Flux Australian Reactor at Lucas Heights, New South Wales operated from 1958 to 2007. The OPAL research reactor is currently in operation at Lucas Heights.

Australian uranium is mined and sold only for electrical power generation or nuclear research, Almost all the uranium is exported under strict International Atomic Energy Agency safeguards.

== Government policy and politics ==
Uranium mining in Australia has been highly political, particularly for the Australian Labor Party (ALP) at both state and federal level. Development of projects has often been stymied by a succession of inquiries and the politicisation of the issuing of mining and export licences.

The biennial ALP National conference in 1982 debated the issue vigorously. At the 1984 Conference, the newly elected federal Labor government under Bob Hawke introduced the so-called "Three mine policy". The policy confined Australian uranium mining activities to the three sites already operational: Ranger, Nabarlek and Olympic Dam with a moratorium on new mines opening. Subsequently, reserves at Nabarlek were depleted and the Beverley Uranium Mine became the notional third mine.

The coalition won the 1996 Federal election under John Howard and promptly abandoned the policy.

On 28 April 2007, the Howard government adopted a new uranium strategy which aimed to immediately remove "unnecessary constraints impeding the expansion of uranium mining, such as overlapping and cumbersome regulations relating to the mining and transport of uranium ore" and repeal prohibitions on further nuclear industrial development which had been established in 1999 under the Environment Protection and Biodiversity Conservation (EPBC) Act 1999.

The same day, the Labor party abandoned its "no new mines" policy, while maintaining its opposition to other forms of nuclear industrial development in Australia.

After returning to government in 2008, the ALP approved a fourth uranium mine in July 2009: the Four Mile uranium mine in South Australia, thus ending its 25-year-old policy. Federal Resources Minister Martin Ferguson subsequently declared that increased uranium mining in Australia was inevitable.

=== Recent legislative changes ===
The Western Australian ban on uranium mining was removed in 2008.

Queensland's ban on uranium mining was revoked in 2012, when Premier Campbell Newman back-flipped on a pre-election promise. In March 2015 the Palaszczuk government announced that it would be reinstating the ban.

The New South Wales Government passed the Mining Legislation Amendment (Uranium Exploration) Act 2012 No 16 on 4 April 2012. The Act was proclaimed on 14 September 2012. The Act removed the ban on uranium exploration to help gain an understanding of what uranium and uranium-bearing mineral resources may exist in the State. The ban on uranium mining remains in place.

=== Opposition ===
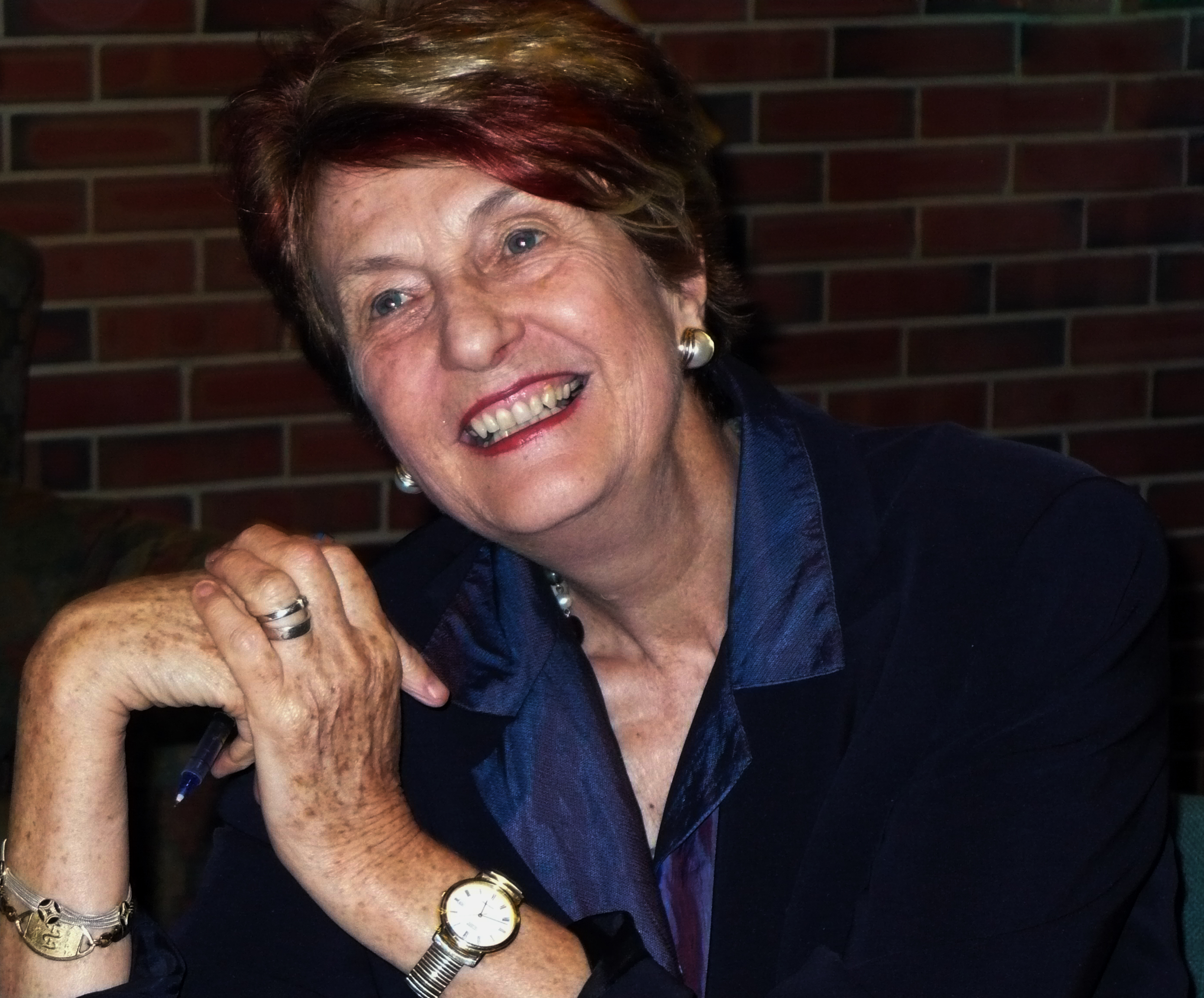
Dr Helen Caldicott

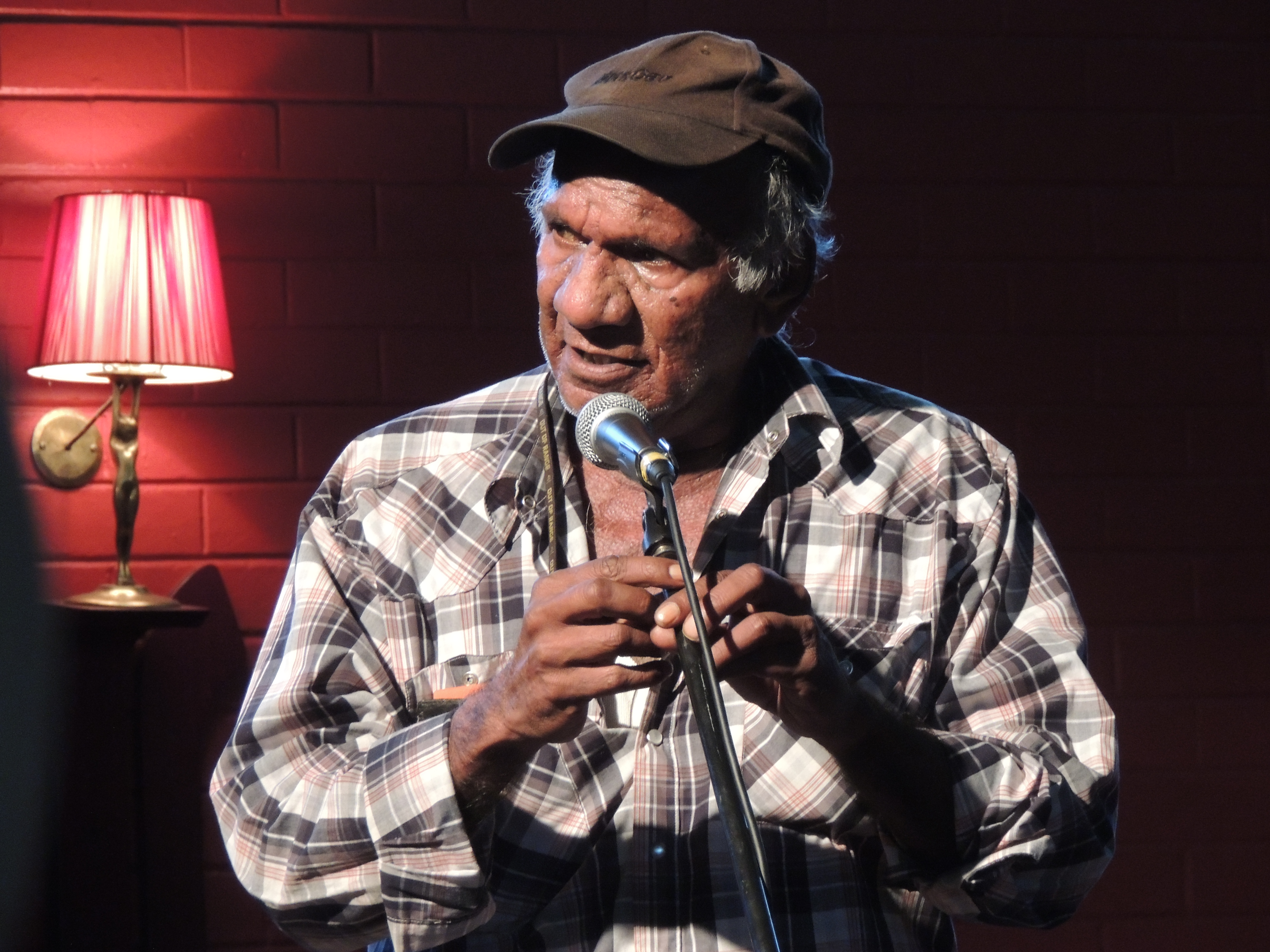
Kevin Buzzacott in Adelaide 2014

Opposition to uranium mining has been considerable in Australia, and notable anti-uranium activists have included Dr Helen Calidicott, Kevin Buzzacott, Jacqui Katona, Yvonne Margarula, and Jillian Marsh. In the 1970s and 1980s demonstrations numbering up to tens of thousands people were held around Australia and the loading of yellowcake on ships was disrupted by environmentalists and unionists. In 1983 and 1984 the Olympic Dam mine at Roxby Downs was blockaded and an anti-uranium vigil maintained between each protest.

In November 2011, Prime Minister Julia Gillard called on the ALP to reverse its policy at the ALP national conference, to allow export of Australian uranium to India. India has not signed the nuclear non-proliferation treaty.

While being welcomed at the time by State and Federal governments as a major boost to the economy, the proposed Olympic Dam expansion of mining operations did attract criticism. In 2010, local traditional owners and Indigenous communities protested the proposed expansion. In July 2012, more than 400 people joined a "Lizard's Revenge march" to the Olympic Dam site. The anti-nuclear activists, including Elder Kevin Buzzacott, protested against the mine expansion and the uranium industry. They say the company and the government have put short-term economic gain ahead of environmental and health concerns. Organiser Nectaria Calan said police harassed protesters, demanding identification and controlling access to and from their campsite. In August 2012, BHP Billiton announced that the expansion was being postponed indefinitely pending investigation of a "new and cheaper design".

In 2016, BHP Billiton's asset president, Jacqui McGill, announced that the expansion plans would move ahead, "through low-risk, capital efficient underground expansions."

== Regulation of uranium mining in Australia ==
=== Federal law ===
Mining or milling uranium ore is defined as a 'nuclear action' in Environment Protection and Biodiversity Conservation Act 1999, s.22(1)(d). This means that an EPBC Act approval is required for uranium mining from the Federal Environment Minister if a corporation or the Commonwealth or a Commonwealth agency is to take a nuclear action that has, will have or is likely to have a significant impact on the environment (s.21(1)).

=== State and Territory laws ===
==== NSW ====
Until 2012, the Uranium Mining and Nuclear Facilities (Prohibitions) Act 1986 (NSW) prohibited uranium mining in NSW. In 2012 the O'Farrell government proposed the repeal of selected provisions of this Act, by means of the Mining Legislation Amendment (Uranium Exploration) Bill 2012, which passed on 28 March 2012, and received Royal Assent on 4 April 2012. The UMNFP Act had made it an offence to prospect for, or to mine, uranium in NSW. (s.7) The 2012 Bill removed the general prohibition on prospecting for uranium in New South Wales. It also enables exploration licences and associated permits (but no other licences or authorities) to be granted under the Mining Act 1992 to prospect for uranium, to apply the State environmental planning policy applicable to other mineral exploration to uranium prospecting, vests all uranium in NSW in the Crown and excludes compensation for that vesting. The UMNFP Act still prohibits State authorities from constructing or operating nuclear reactors for the production of electricity (s.9).

==== Queensland ====
Mining uranium was banned in Queensland from 1989 to 2012. The ban was repealed by the Newman government, then the Palaszczuk government in 2015 announced that it would be reinstated.

==== South Australia ====
Radiation Protection and Control Act 1982 (SA) (ss. 5, 27).

Roxby Downs (Indenture Ratification) Act 1982 (see: Schedule)

On 19 March 2015 the South Australian government established The Nuclear Fuel Cycle Royal Commission to investigate the expansion of uranium mining and exploration of new uranium deposits in South Australia. On 15 November 2016 the government decided to support all five uranium mining related recommendations made by the commission.

==== Victoria ====
Nuclear Activities (Prohibitions) Act 1983 - s.5: Prohibition against exploration etc. for uranium or thorium

==== Western Australia ====
- Uranium (Yeelirrie) Agreement Act 1978 see alsohttp://www.dmp.wa.gov.au/9997.aspx

Before the 2017 State election, former Western Australia's Environment Minister, Albert Jacob, gave approval for the Wiluna Project, owned by Toro Energy, the Yeelirrie Project owned by Cameco and the Mulga Rock Project owned by Vimy Resources. The WA McGowan government was elected in March 2017 and reinstated the ban on uranium mining but allowed these three and the Kintyre Project, owned by Cameco, to proceed.

== Mines ==
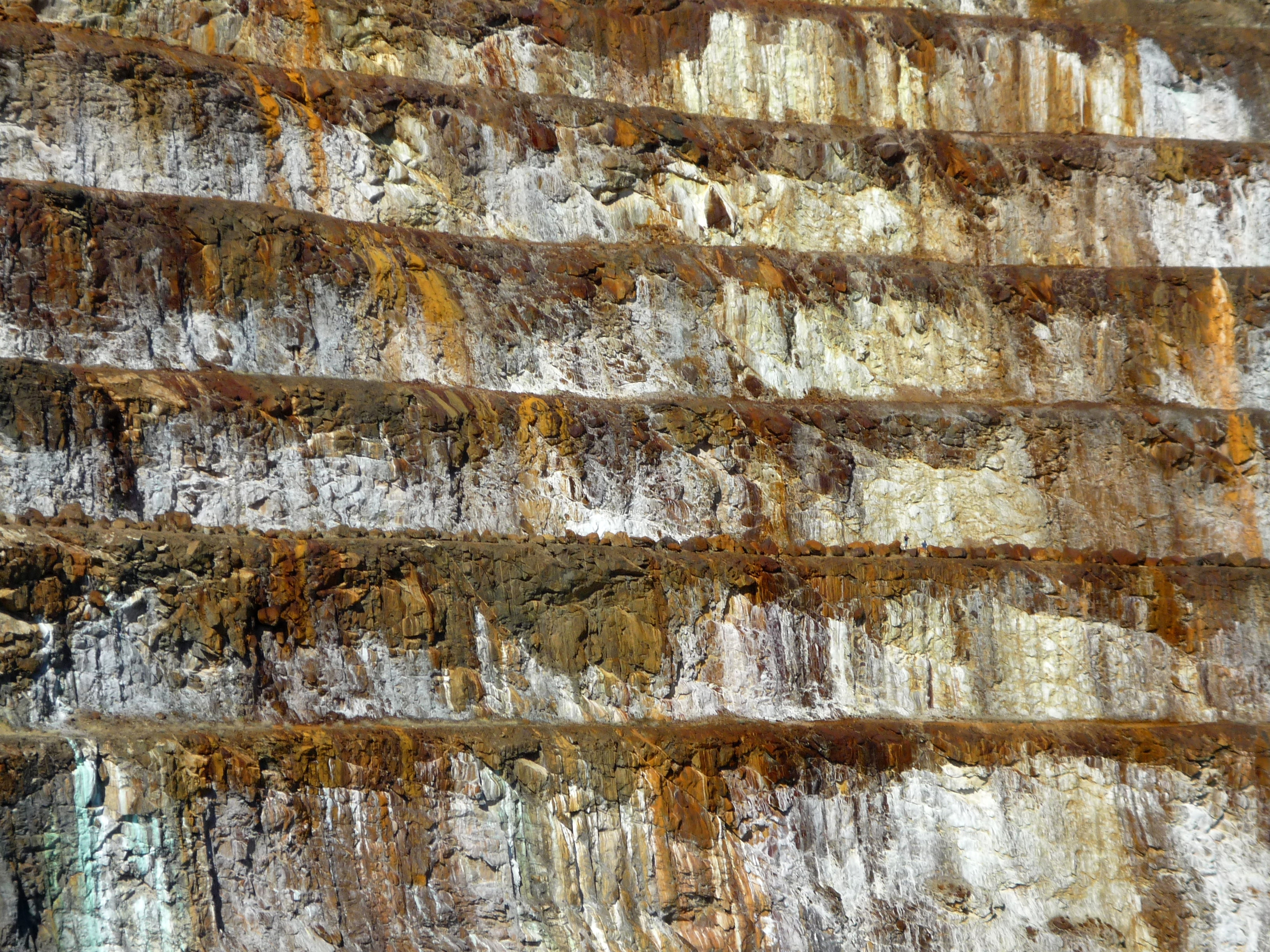
Mary Kathleen mine, 2011

About 96% of known resources are at six sites: Olympic Dam (the world's largest known uranium deposit), Ranger, Jabiluka, Koongarra, Kintyre and Yeelirrie.

Uranium Mines in Australia
Name	Alternate Names	State	Coordinates	Status	Commodities	Geological Province	Geological Age	Deposit Model
Carrapateena mine	Carrapateena	South Australia	31.2175°S 137.4984°E	Operating Mine	Copper, Gold, (Silver, Uranium oxide)	Gawler craton, Olympic Domain		
Four Mile uranium mine	Four Mile East	South Australia	30.1417°S 139.5292°E	Operating Mine	Uranium, Uranium oxide	Callabonna Sub-basin	Cenozoic	
Coronation Hill		Northern Territory	13.5862°S 132.6074°E	Historic Mine	Gold, (Uranium, Platinum, Palladium, Platinum group elements, Uranium oxide)	Pine Creek Orogen	Paleoproterozoic	Environment: Basin hydrothermal, Group: Unconformity-related, Type: Unconformity-related U
Nabarlek Uranium Mine	Nabarlek	Northern Territory	12.3082°S 133.32°E	Historic Mine	Uranium oxide, Uranium	Pine Creek Orogen	Proterozoic	Environment: Basin hydrothermal, Group: Unconformity-related, Type: Unconformity-related U
Beverley Uranium Mine	Beverley	South Australia	30.1904°S 139.6051°E	Care And Maintenance	Uranium oxide, Uranium	Lake Eyre Basin, Callabonna Sub-basin	Cenozoic	
Kintyre		Western Australia	22.3374°S 122.0722°E	Feasibility	Uranium, (Uranium oxide)	Paterson Orogen, Rudall PGE (prospective) Metallogenic Province, Rudall Province	Proterozoic	
Olympic Dam mine	Olympic Dam, Roxby Downs	South Australia	30.4374°S 136.8893°E	Operating Mine	Copper, Gold, (Uranium, Silver, Rare earth elements)	Gawler craton, Olympic Copper Gold Metallogenic Province, Olympic Domain	Mesoproterozoic	Environment: Regional metasomatic, Group: IOCG, Type: Hematite-dominant IOCG
Monakoff	Mount Margaret, Mt Margaret, Tinboll	Queensland	20.625°S 140.6885°E	Care And Maintenance	Copper, Gold, (Uranium, Cobalt, Silver)	Mount Isa Orogen, Cloncurry-Selwyn Zone	Proterozoic	Environment: Regional metasomatic, Group: IOCG, Type: Magnetite-dominant IOCG
Mary Kathleen, Queensland	Mary Kathleen	Queensland	20.746°S 140.013°E	Historic Mine	Rare earth oxides, Uranium, Uranium oxide	Mount Isa Orogen, Mary Kathleen Domain, Mary Kathleen Zone	Paleoproterozoic	Environment: Magmatic hydrothermal, Group: Skarn, Type: Skarn U-REE
Mount Painter	Armchair, Mt Gee, Radium Ridge, Streitberg	South Australia	30.227°S 139.37°E	Historic Mine	Uranium, Rare earth elements, Uranium oxide	Mount Painter Block	Paleozoic	
Eva	Pandanus Creek	Northern Territory	17.681°S 137.8196°E	Historic Mine	Uranium, Gold, (Uranium oxide)	Mount Isa Orogen, Murphy Inlier		
Honeymoon Uranium Mine	Honeymoon	South Australia	31.741°S 140.6624°E	Care And Maintenance	Uranium, (Uranium oxide)	Lake Eyre Basin, Callabonna Sub-basin	Cenozoic	
Mount Elliott mine	Mount Elliott, Mt Elliott	Queensland	21.54°S 140.5017°E	Historic Mine	Copper, Gold, (Uranium)	Mount Isa Orogen, Kuridala-Selwyn Domain, Selwyn Metallogenic Province, Cloncurry-Selwyn Zone	Mesoproterozoic	Environment: Regional metasomatic, Group: IOCG, Type: Magnetite-dominant IOCG
Ranger Uranium Mine	Ranger	Northern Territory	12.6735°S 132.9185°E	Closed	Uranium, (Uranium oxide)	Pine Creek Orogen	Proterozoic	Environment: Basin hydrothermal, Group: Unconformity-related, Type: Unconformity-related U
Mount Margaret-E1 (Glencore)	E1, E1 East, E1 North, E1 South, Monakoff, Mt Margaret	Queensland	20.4424°S 140.7829°E	Operating Mine	Copper, Gold, (Uranium, Uranium oxide)	Mount Isa Orogen	Proterozoic	
Four Mile uranium mine	Four Mile West	South Australia	30.15°S 139.5°E	Operating Mine	Uranium, (Uranium oxide)	Callabonna Sub-basin	Cenozoic	
Ben Lomond		Queensland	19.377°S 146.3°E	Historic Mine	Uranium, (Molybdenum, Uranium oxide)	Lachlan Orogen, Charters Towers Province		
Rum Jungle, Northern Territory	Rum Jungle Creek South	Northern Territory	13.0397°S 130.9984°E	Historic Mine	Uranium, Uranium oxide	Pine Creek Orogen	Proterozoic	Environment: unknown, Group: unknown, Type: unknown
El Sherana		Northern Territory	13.5057°S 132.5203°E	Historic Mine	Gold, Uranium oxide, Uranium	Pine Creek Orogen	Proterozoic	Environment: Basin hydrothermal, Group: Unconformity-related, Type: Unconformity-related U
Radium Hill		South Australia	32.3426°S 140.6353°E	Historic Mine	Uranium oxide, Uranium	Curnamona Province	Proterozoic	Environment: Regional metasomatic, Group: Metasomatic iron, Type: Iron oxide U
Mount Burton		Northern Territory	12.977°S 130.9636°E	Historic Mine	Copper, Uranium, Uranium oxide	Pine Creek Orogen	Proterozoic	
White's		Northern Territory	12.9849°S 131.008°E	Historic Mine	Uranium, Copper, Uranium oxide, Lead, Cobalt	Pine Creek Orogen, Mount Todd Gold Metallogenic Province	Proterozoic	
Mount Fitch (Northern Territory)	Mount Fitch	Northern Territory	12.9468°S 130.9483°E	Historic Mine	Nickel, Copper, Cobalt, Uranium, Uranium oxide	Pine Creek Orogen	Proterozoic	
Ashburton Downs	Windy Ridge	Western Australia	23.4509°S 117.2533°E	Historic Mine	Copper, Uranium	Ashburton Basin	Proterozoic	

Closed/depleted

- Ranger Uranium Mine
- Radium Hill
- Nabarlek Uranium Mine
- Rum Jungle Mine
- Mary Kathleen mine

Operating

- Olympic Dam mine
- Beverley Uranium Mine
- Four Mile uranium mine
- Honeymoon Uranium Mine

Known deposits/possible future minesites

- Mount Gee uranium deposit
- Jabiluka uranium deposit
- Kintyre uranium deposit
- Yeelirrie uranium project

== See also ==
- Anti-nuclear movement in Australia
- Australian Uranium Association
- Environmental issues in Australia
- Fallout and Follow Me (1977 play)
- Gavin Mudd
- List of countries by uranium reserves
- Nuclear industry in South Australia
- Nuclear power in Australia
- Supervising Scientist
- Treaty on the Non-Proliferation of Nuclear Weapons
- Uranium mining in Kakadu National Park
- World Uranium Hearing
- Uranium mining
