= Heathgate Resources =

Heathgate Resources Pty Ltd
- Type: Subsidiary
- Industry: Uranium mining
- Founded: 1990; 36 years ago in Adelaide, South Australia, Australia
- Headquarters: Adelaide, South Australia, Australia
- Products: Uranium oxide
- Parent: General Atomics
- Website: www.heathgate.com.au

Heathgate Resources Pty Ltd is a uranium mining company owned by the US-based nuclear company, General Atomics. Heathgate owns and operates the Beverley and Beverley North uranium mines which are located in the Frome Basin about 550 kilometres (340 mi) north of Adelaide in South Australia. In 2000, Heathgate Resources established Australia’s first operating in-situ recovery (ISR) uranium mine. The company is based in Adelaide and is a sponsor of the South Australian Museum. In the South Australian Parliament, Heathgate Resources has been represented by lobbying firms Hawker Britton and Barton Deakin Government Relations.

== Beverley mine ==
Beverley commenced production in late 2000 and was officially opened in 2001. In August 2008, an extension to the Beverley Uranium Mines mining lease was approved. Since the Fukushima disaster in 2011, the Beverley mine has suffered significant financial losses. Heathgate claims to operate the "world's most advanced In-Situ Recovery (ISR) mine." The project's infrastructure includes a processing plant, two satellite plants, a power plant, airstrip and camp accommodation to sleep 180 persons. The fly-in fly-out workforce travels in two Encore jets, operated by Sharp Airlines. The power plant is gas-fired, has an output of 4 MW and was constructed by Leighton Contractors for a cost of $5.8 million.

== Beverley North mine ==
The Beverley North deposits were discovered in 2009 and mining was approved in February 2011.
