= Fallout and Follow Me =

Play by Richard Fotheringham

Fallout and Follow Me is an Australian play written and directed by Richard Fotheringham and first performed by the Popular Theatre Troupe in 1977. It was primarily toured through mining towns in Queensland, Australia during its initial run. Greg King, Nicola Scott, Janet Mahoney, John Lane, and Errol O'Neill were among its initial cast members.

== Style ==
The play is presented in the style of Brecht and presents a message against nuclear energy and mining. It presents companies such as Rio Tinto, Westinghouse and General Electric as characters as they go through several key moments in the history of uranium mining in Australia and other countries, such as the swindling of Australian, Canadian and South African governments in order to mine uranium, the 1961 court martial, and the introduction of the Ranger Uranium Mine enquiry report.

== Characters ==
- Compere (Westinghouse)
- General (General Electric)
- Sergeant (Rio Tinto)
- Nurse (Represents the free world governments)
