= Yeelirrie Station =

Pastoral lease in Western Australia

Coordinates: 27°17′04″S 120°05′36″E

Location in Western Australia

Yeelirrie is an East Murchison pastoral lease or sheep station on state Crown land, located approximately 80 kilometres (50 mi) south west of Wiluna, in the Mid West region of Western Australia. The nearest population centre to Yeelirrie homestead is Mount Keith Mine village, 45 kilometres (28 mi) to the east. The regional centre is Meekatharra, located 180 kilometres (112 mi) to the west.

The landform at Yeelirrie comprises a raised plateau that has eroded to form granitic breakaways and the alluvial plains of the surrounding valleys. Acacia woodlands (dominated by Acacia aneura) and shrublands with spinifex grasslands (Triodia basedowii) dominate the vegetation.

The area is located toward the inland extreme of two separate weather systems. The main influence on the climate is the east-west belt of high pressure systems that lies over the southern portions of Australia throughout the year. During summer this belt of high pressure systems moves southward and the climate at Yeelirrie becomes influenced by the northern monsoonal system. Rainfall in the area is variable and unpredictable. It occurs either with the passage of winter cold fronts or as a result of local thunderstorms during summer. Average rainfall is 208 mm annually, with a recorded range between 43 mm and 505 mm. Annual extreme temperatures range between 45 °C and −5 °C.

Yeelirrie Station covers an area of 3,750 square kilometres (927,000 acres). The station was originally established in 1924 by Val Finch. In 1950, 7179 sheep were shorn for 169 bales (approx. 25,000 kg). In 1957 the neighbouring Altona pastoral lease was incorporated into the station. Yeelirrie is now owned and operated by BHP. From 1974 to 1986 the station was largely destocked. A small number of sheep were run. These were recently removed due to increasing incidence of wild dog and dingo attacks.

Yeelirrie is the site of the Yeelirrie uranium deposit. The deposit was discovered in 1970 by Western Mining Corporation, and later bought by BHP. In August 2012, BHP sold the project to Canadian mining company Cameco for US$430 million.

An environmental impact survey of the station was conducted in 2011 for BHP Billiton; it discovered three new species, one of which is named Atriplex yeelirrie, after the station.

In the local Aboriginal language, the word Yeelirrie or Youlirrie means "place of death".

== See also ==
- List of ranches and stations
