= Wheal Watkins mine =

Mine in South Australia

Wheal Watkins
- Location in Australia
- Location: Glen Osmond, South Australia, Australia; 34°57′42″S 138°39′20″E
- Products: Lead; Silver
- Opened: 1843
- Closed: 1916
- Company: Wheal Gawler Mining Association; Adelaide Silver Lead Company; Tarcoola Development Syndicate

Wheal Watkins mine, formerly Wheal Gawler mine, is an historic lead and silver mine in Glen Osmond, South Australia. The mine first operated from 1844 until 1850, and again briefly in 1888 to 1889, and 1916. From 1986 onwards, the mine was accessible by guided tour, until a rockfall event prompted its closure in 2005.

== Development ==
The Wheal Watkins mine was preceded by the Wheal Gawler mine, which was opened in May 1841. The initial discovery of galena in the field is attributed to James Heneker.

The property containing the Wheal Watkins lead and silver deposit was purchased by Mr. Watkins of Worthing, England in December 1841. It was purchased through his South Australian agent, Peter Peachey, who opened a mine there on his behalf in 1843. He first worked the deposit in May 1844. The lode was found to contain 70% lead and 30 ounces of silver per ton. The ore was sold in London for £13 13 shillings per ton.

The mine's principal contractor was Thomas Williams, and a team of Cornish miners was employed. The 'wheal' part of the name comes from Cornish, and means 'place of work'.

In its first year, the mine employed twelve to eighteen people. In the mine's first seven months, 150 tons of ore was extracted, 100 tons of which was shipped to England. A nearby hotel called The Miner's Arms provided accommodation and provisions to visitors to the mine and region. Peachey died in 1850, but work on the mine continued. The mine was abandoned due to a combination of "extravagant" management, the "ridiculously high" impost of royalties, and miners seeking more lucrative prospects during the Victorian gold rush of 1851.

== Later workings ==
The field, which included the adjacent Wheal Gawler and Glen Osmond mines, enjoyed a short-lived revival in 1888. At this time, the operation was led by Captain Rowe, and the mine's secretary was Mr. H. Conigrave. A report on the mine from 1888 referred to the mine by the alternative name of "Peachey's lode".

In 1913, a prospector became faint while down the mine, and was saved from falling to his death by his partner. A bow-line loop of rope was lowered around his body and the prospector was hauled safely to the surface.

The last entity to formally work the mine was the Tarcoola Development Syndicate in 1916.

== Closure ==
After the closure of the mine, some shafts and adits remained open. Several incidents are known to have occurred whereby people or animals fell down holes or became stuck in adits. These include a dog and a cow, both of which were safely recovered.

== Preservation ==
The mine was listed on the South Australian Heritage Register in 1984, added to the now-defunct Register of the National Estate in 1996, and re-opened by then South Australian Minister for Mines, Stephen Baker MP.

In 2004, tours departed from the Burnside Council Chambers with a round trip two hours in duration. Tours ran on the third Sunday of every month, and tickets cost $7 for adults and $4 for children.

In 2005, the mine was closed after a rockfall event.

In 2008, a bequest of $30,000 AUD was given to the City of Burnside Council in trust, to facilitate repairs and make it possible to reopen the mine for tours. The late donor, John Clark, had previously facilitated tours of the mine from 1986, and appeared in an episode of the TV series Postcards which was dedicated to the Glen Osmond mines and presented by Keith Conlon.

In 2008, Ross Both and Greg Drew wrote of the Glen Osmond mines in the Journal of Australasian Mining History: "It is essential that further restoration of the [Wheal Watkins] adits be carried out so that public access will again be possible to one of Australia's most significant mining heritage sites."

In 2013, Mayor David Parkin stated that "ratepayers have outlaid considerable funds on preservation of these mines over the years and it is a matter of judgment when enough is enough."

As of March 2016, the mine remains closed to the public. The Burnside Historical Society plans to work with the council to reopen the mine for tours and develop a display for public viewing which will feature a pick found in the Glen Osmond mine and a piece of galena.

== Gallery ==
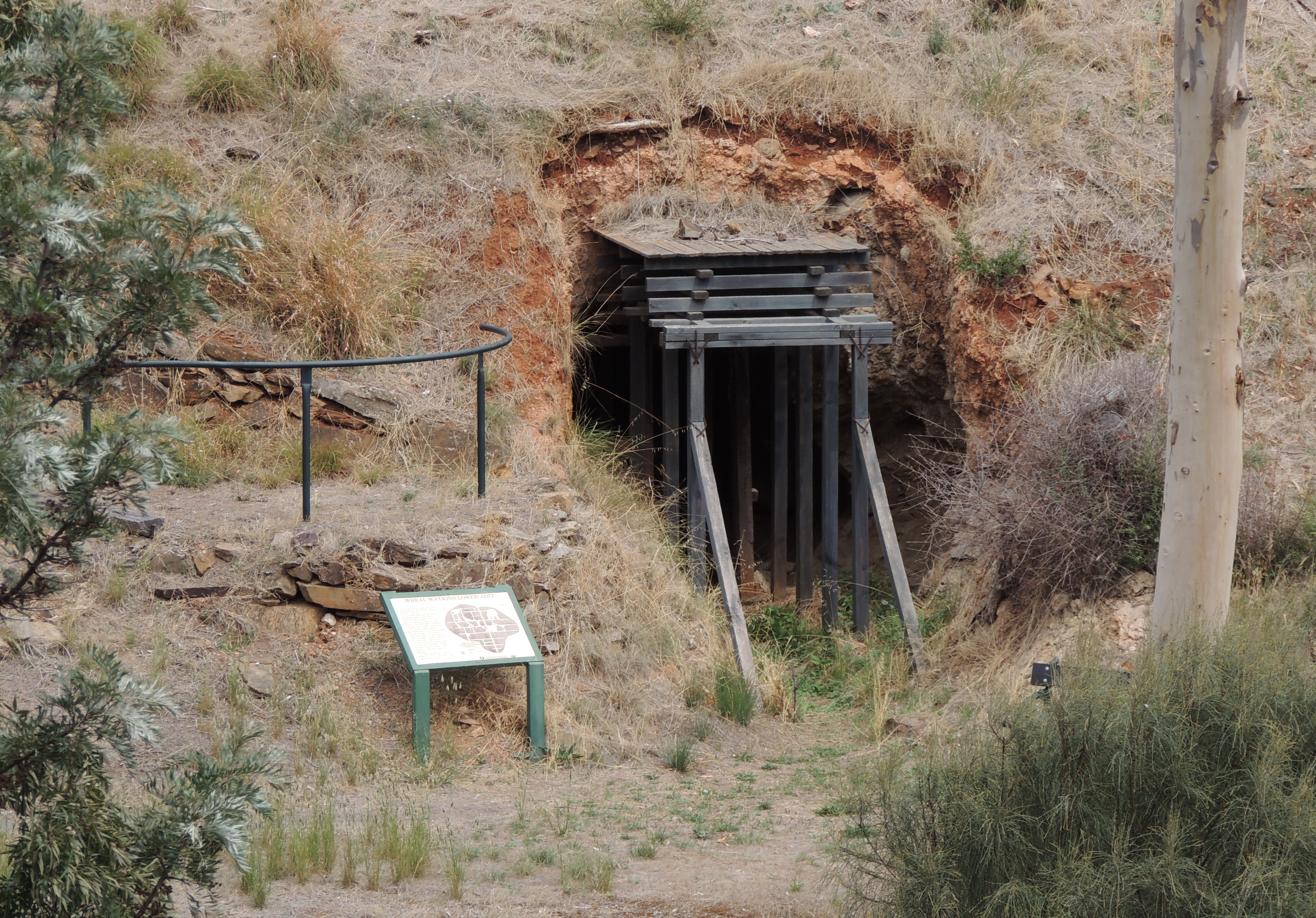
Lower adit mine entrance

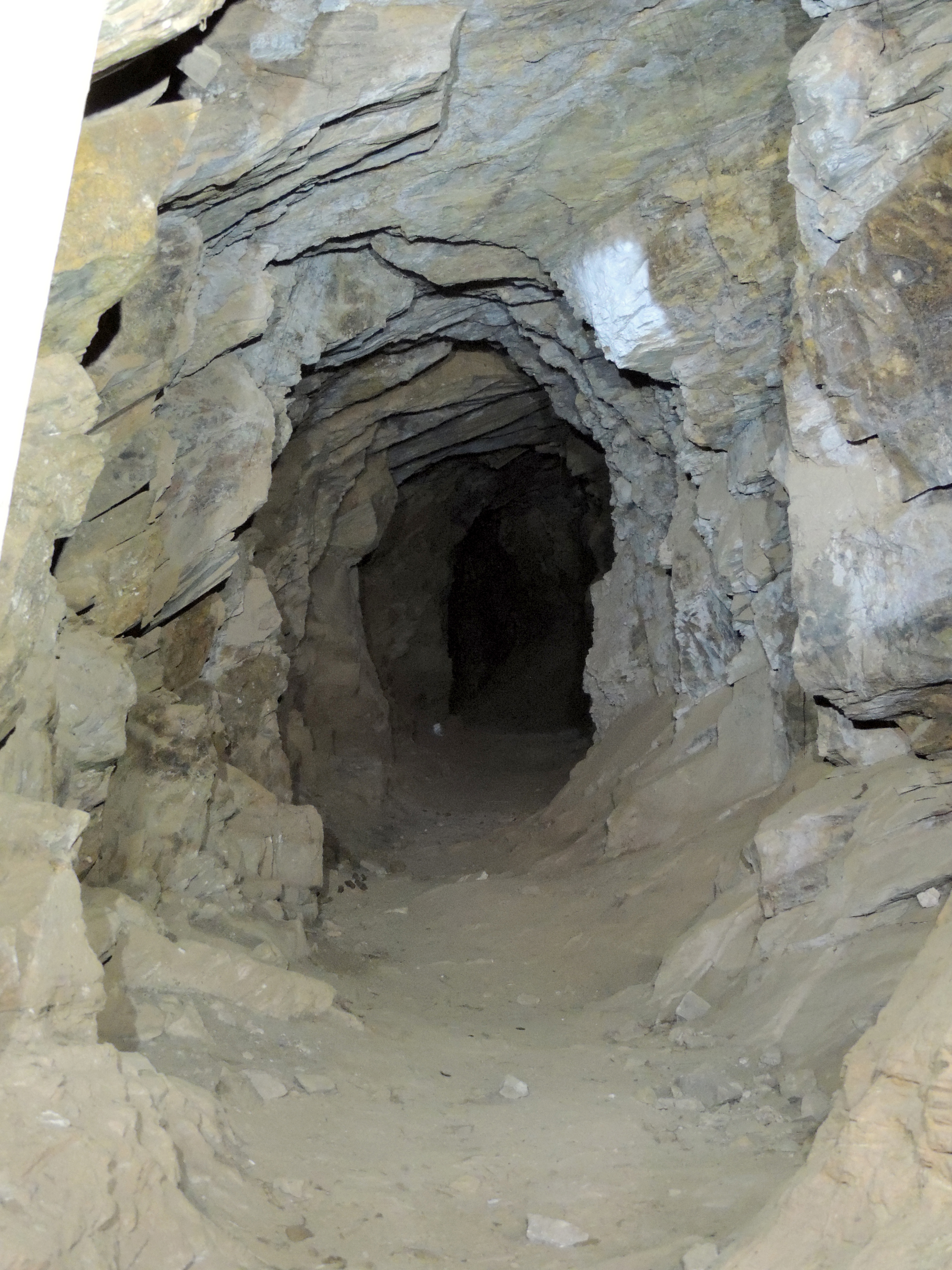
Lower adit interior view from mine entrance

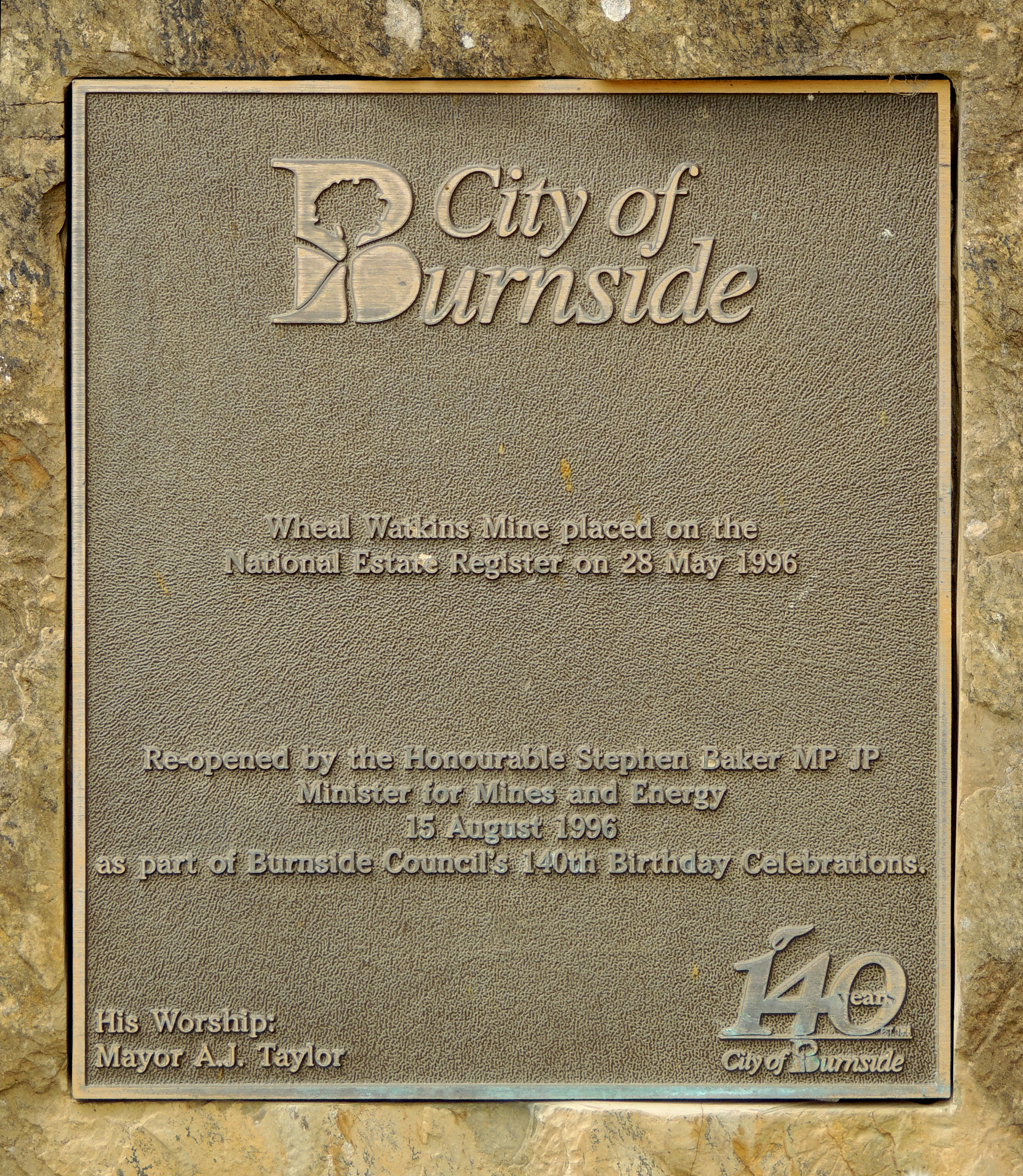
Heritage Listing commemorative plaque
