= Kintyre uranium deposit =

Mineral deposit in Western Australia

- Location in Western Australia
- Location: North of Karlamilyi National Park, Western Australia, Australia; 22°20′17″S 122°04′19″E
- Products: Uranium
- Company: Cameco (70%) and Mitsubishi Corporation (30%)
- Website: Cameco website
- Acquired: 2008

The Kintyre uranium project is located 60 km south of the Telfer gold mine and 260 km northeast of Newman at the western edge of the Great Sandy Desert in the East Pilbara region of Western Australia.

== History ==
Uranium was discovered in the Kintyre area in 1976 by Esso Minerals, which declined to develop the prospect. It was taken up by Rio Tinto as an exploration Licence in 1978, when it read Esso Minerals' report of the initial helicopter-borne survey by Geoffrey Iliff, Exploration Geologist of Esso Minerals. Due to depressed uranium prices CRA placed the project on care and maintenance in 1998. The camp was dismantled and the site rehabilitated in 2002. The deposit was initially within the Karlamilyi National Park, but the area enclosing the deposit was excised from the park in 1994.

The Kintyre property was acquired in 2008 by a 70:30 joint venture between Cameco Corporation and Mitsubishi Corporation. The project is operated by Cameco Australia Pty Ltd, a wholly owned subsidiary of Cameco. The project has an indicated mineral resource of 3.9 million tonnes grading 0.62% U_{3}O_{8}, for a total of 53.5 million pounds of U_{3}O_{8}.

== See also ==
- Uranium mining in Australia
- Uranium ore deposits
