= In situ leach =

Solution mining process for recovering certain dissolved metals

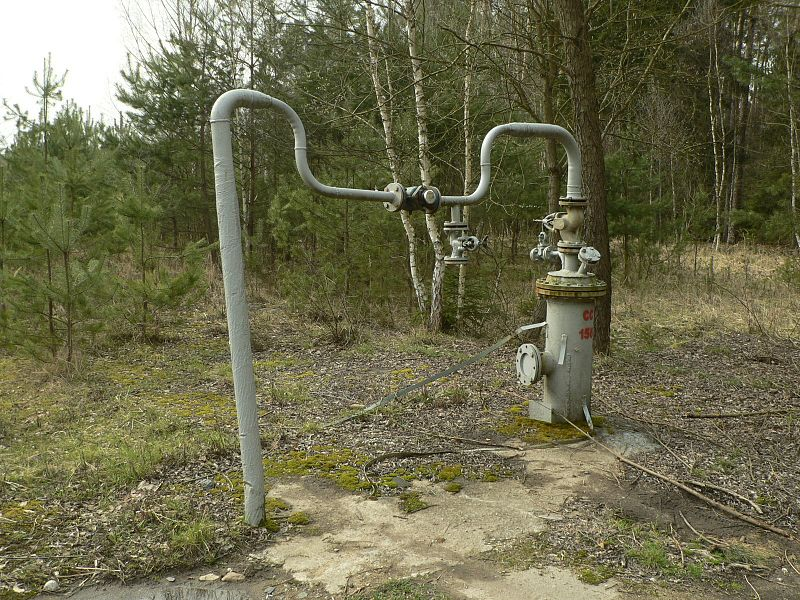
Remains of an abandoned piping system used for uranium in-situ leaching in Stráž pod Ralskem, Czech Republic

In-situ leaching (ISL), also called in-situ recovery (ISR) or solution mining, is a mining process used to recover minerals such as copper and uranium through boreholes drilled into a deposit, in situ. In-situ leach works by artificially dissolving minerals occurring naturally in the solid state.

The process initially involves the drilling of boreholes into the ore deposit. Explosive or hydraulic fracturing can be used to create open pathways in the deposit for the solution to penetrate. Leaching solution is pumped into the deposit where it comes in contact with the ore. The solution bearing the dissolved ore content is then pumped to the surface and processed. This process allows the extraction of metals and salts from an ore body without the need for conventional mining involving drill-and-blast, open-cut or underground mining.

== Process ==
In-situ leach mining involves pumping of a lixiviant into the ore body via a borehole, which circulates through the porous rock dissolving the ore and is extracted via a second borehole.

The lixiviant varies according to the ore deposit: for salt deposits the leachate can be fresh water into which salts can readily dissolve. For copper, acids are generally needed to enhance solubility of the ore minerals within the solution. For uranium ores, the lixiviant may be acid or sodium bicarbonate.

== Minerals ==
=== Potash and soluble salts ===
In-situ leach is widely used to extract deposits of water-soluble salts such as potash (sylvite and carnallite), rock salt (halite), sodium chloride, and sodium sulfate. It has been used in the US state of Colorado to extract nahcolite (sodium bicarbonate). In-situ leaching is often used for deposits that are too deep, or beds that are too thin, to be mined conventionally.

=== Uranium ===
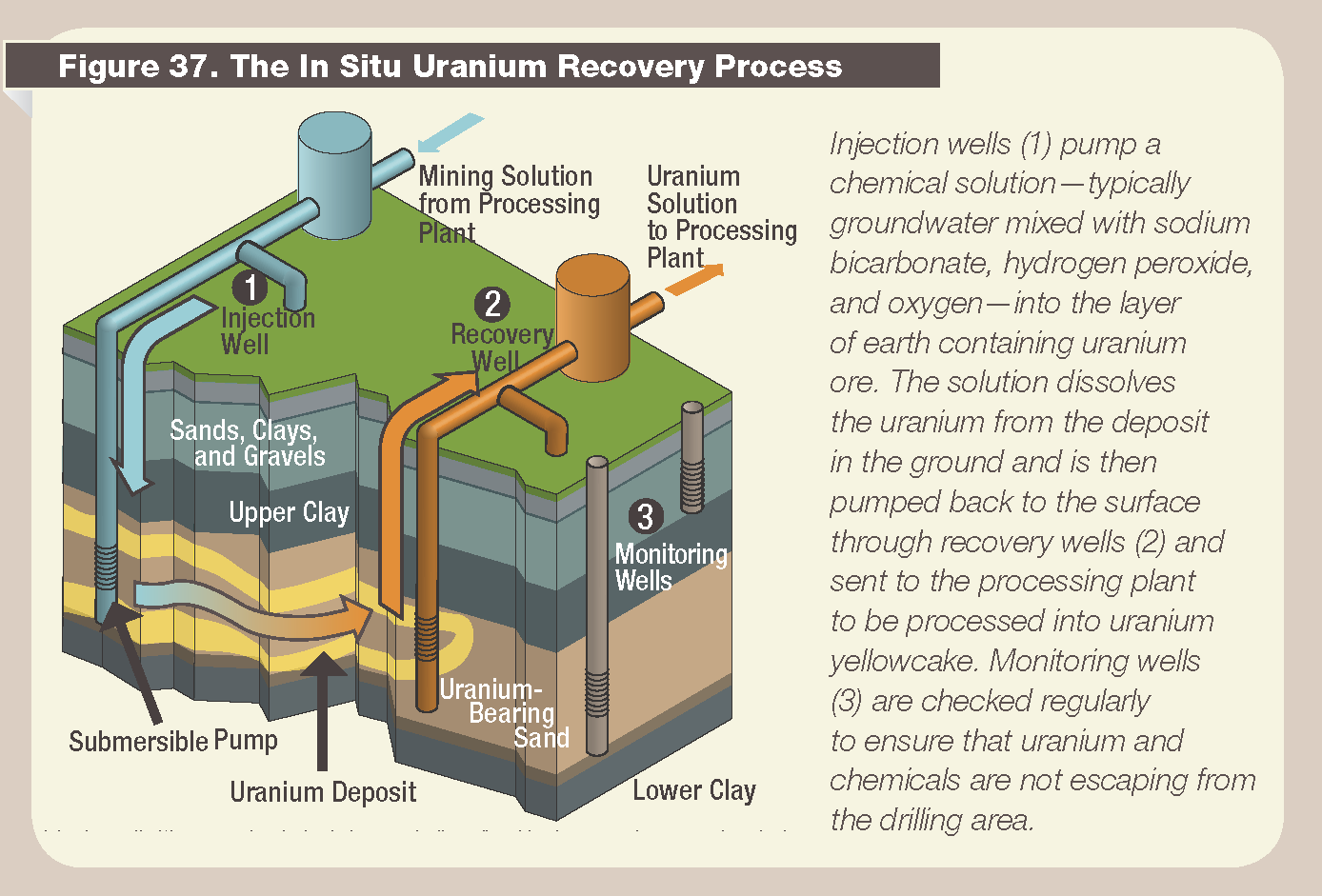
Diagram of in-situ leaching for uranium (US NRC)

In-situ leach for uranium has expanded rapidly since the 1990s, and is now the predominant method for mining uranium, accounting for 45 percent of the uranium mined worldwide in 2012.

Unlike open-pit and underground mining, in-situ leaching does not rely on burial depth as a criterion but is based on the properties of the uranium deposit. In-situ leaching techniques are systematically categorized based on the primary components of the leaching solution, encompassing acid leaching, alkaline leaching, neutral leaching and bioleaching.

Acid leaching is applicable to low-carbonate uranium deposits, with U(VI) dissolving in acid solution while U(IV) dissolving in acid solution with oxidizing agent; Alkaline leaching is effective for high-carbonate uranium deposits but unsuitable for high-pyrite deposits, with U(VI) dissolving in alkaline solution while U(IV) dissolving in alkaline solution with oxidizing agent; Neutral leaching, including CO_{2}-O_{2} leaching and weak acid leaching, is widely applicable; and Bioleaching is also widely applicable, especially ideal for pyrite-rich uranium deposits.

ISL of uranium ores started in the United States and the Soviet Union in the early 1960s. The first uranium ISL in the US was in the Shirley Basin in the state of Wyoming, which operated from 1961-1970 using sulfuric acid. Since 1970, all commercial-scale ISL mines in the US have used carbonate solutions.

ISL mining in Australia uses acid solutions.

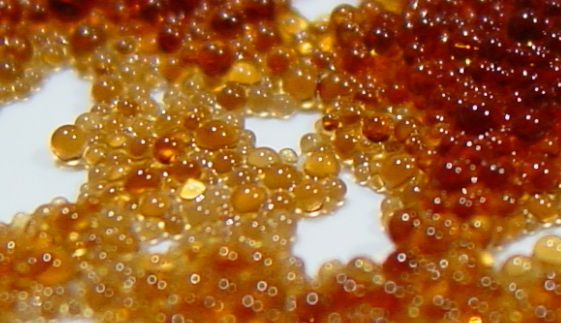
Ion exchange resin beads

In-situ recovery involves the extraction of uranium-bearing water (grading as low as 0.05%, or 500 ppm, U_{3}O_{8}). The extracted uranium solution is then filtered through resin beads. Through an ion exchange process, the resin beads attract uranium from the solution. Uranium loaded resins are then transported to a processing plant, where U_{3}O_{8} is separated from the resin beads and yellowcake is produced. The resin beads can then be returned to the ion exchange facility where they are reused.

At the end of 2008 there were four in-situ leaching uranium mines operating in the United States, operated by Cameco, Mestena and Uranium Resources, Inc., all using sodium bicarbonate. ISL produces 90% of the uranium mined in the US. In 2010, Uranium Energy Corporation began in-situ leach operations at their Palangana project in Duval County, Texas. In July 2012 Cameco delayed development of their Kintyre project, due to challenging project economics based on $45.00 U_{3}O_{8}. One ISR reclamation project was also in operation as of 2009.

Significant ISL mines are operating in Kazakhstan and Australia.

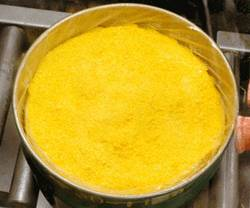
A drum of yellowcake

Examples of in-situ uranium mines include:

- The Beverley Uranium Mine, South Australia, is an operating ISL uranium mine and Australia's first such mine.
- The Honeymoon Uranium Mine, South Australia, opened in 2011 and is Australia's second ISL uranium mine.
- Crow Butte (operating), Smith Ranch-Highland (operating), Christensen Ranch (reclamation), Irigaray (reclamation), Churchrock (proposed), Crownpoint (proposed), Alta Mesa (operating), Hobson (standby), La Palangana (operating), Kingsville Dome (operating), Rosita (standby) and Vasquez (restoration) are ISL uranium operations in the United States.
- In 2010, Uranium Energy Corp. began an ISL mining operation in the Palangana deposit in Duval County, Texas. The ion exchange facility at Palangana trucks uranium-loaded resin beads to the company's Hobson processing plant, where yellowcake is produced. Uranium Energy Corp. has three additional South Texas deposits permitted or in development.

Sandstone-hosted uranium deposits account for approximately one-third of the world's identified recoverable uranium resources and represent the principal target for uranium ISL. Over the past two decades, ISL has become the dominant uranium production method, driven by its high resource utilization efficiency and relatively low environmental footprint. As ISL has been increasingly applied to complex sandstone-hosted deposits, research has focused on improving uranium recovery through well-field optimization, reservoir stimulation, geochemical conditioning, and reactive-transport optimization. These advances aim to enhance recovery efficiency, improve resource utilization, and support more sustainable uranium production.

=== Rhenium ===
There are technologies for the associated extraction of rhenium from productive solutions of underground leaching of uranium ores.

=== Copper ===
In-situ leaching of copper was done by the Chinese by 907 AD, and perhaps as early as 177 BC. Copper is usually leached using acid (sulfuric acid or hydrochloric acid), then recovered from solution by solvent extraction electrowinning (SX-EW) or chemical precipitation.

Ores most amenable to leaching include the copper carbonates malachite and azurite, the oxide tenorite, and the silicate chrysocolla. Other copper minerals, such as the oxide cuprite and the sulfide chalcocite may require addition of oxidizing agents such as ferric sulfate and oxygen to the leachate before the minerals are dissolved. The ores with the highest sulfide contents, such as bornite and chalcopyrite will require more oxidants and will dissolve more slowly. Sometimes oxidation is sped up by the bacteria Thiobacillus ferrooxidans, which feeds on sulfide compounds.

Copper ISL is often done by stope leaching, in which broken low-grade ore is leached in a current or former conventional underground mine. The leaching may take place in backfilled stopes or caved areas. In 1994, stope leaching of copper was reported at 16 mines in the US.

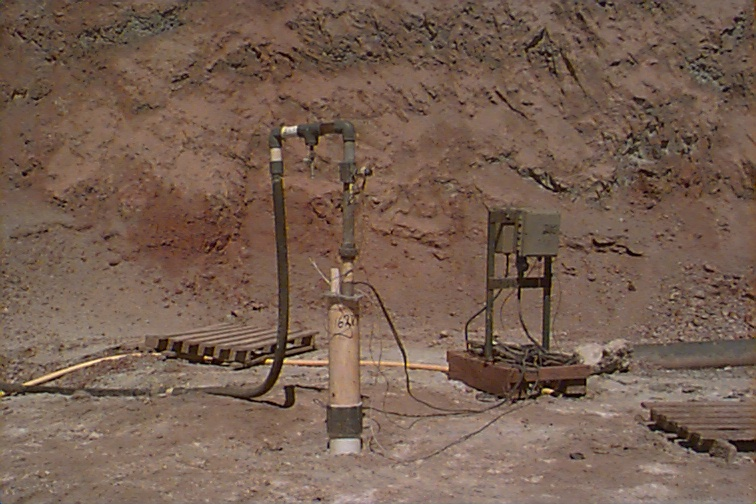
Recovery well at former San Manuel operation.

At the San Manuel Mine in the US state of Arizona, ISL was initially used by collecting the resultant solution underground but in 1995 this was converted to a well-to-well recovery method which was the first large scale implementation of that method. This well-to-well method has been proposed for other copper deposits in Arizona.

=== Gold ===
In-situ leaching has not been used on a commercial scale for gold mining. A three-year pilot program was undertaken in the 1970s to in-situ leach gold ore at the Ajax mine in the Cripple Creek district in the US, using a chloride and iodide solution. After obtaining poor results, perhaps because of the complex telluride ore, the test was halted.

== Environmental concerns ==
According to the World Nuclear Organization:

In the USA legislation requires that the water quality in the effected aquifer be restored so as to enable its pre-mining use. Usually this is potable water or stock water (usually less than 500 ppm total dissolved solids), and while not all chemical characteristics can be returned to those pre-mining, the water must be usable for the same purposes as before. Often it needs to be treated by reverse osmosis, giving rise to a problem in disposing of the concentrated brine stream from this.

The usual radiation safeguards are applied at an ISL Uranium mining operation, despite the fact that most of the orebody's radioactivity remains well underground and there is hence minimal increase in radon release and no ore dust. Employees are monitored for alpha radiation contamination and personal dosimeters are worn to measure exposure to gamma radiation. Routine monitoring of air, dust and surface contamination are undertaken.

The advantages of this technology are:

- Reduced hazards for the employees from accidents, dust, and radiation,
- Low cost, no need for large uranium mill tailings deposits.

After termination of an in-situ leaching operation, the waste slurries produced must be safely disposed, and the aquifer, contaminated from the leaching activities, must be restored. Groundwater restoration is a very tedious process that is not yet fully understood.

The best results have been obtained with the following treatment scheme, consisting of a series of different steps:

- Phase 1: Pumping of contaminated water: the injection of the leaching solution is stopped and the contaminated liquid is pumped from the leaching zone. Subsequently, clean groundwater flows in from outside of the leaching zone.
- Phase 2: as 1, but with treatment of the pumped liquid (by reverse osmosis) and re-injection into the former leaching zone. This scheme results in circulation of the liquid.
- Phase 3: as 2, with the addition of a reducing chemical (for example hydrogen sulfide (H_{2}S) or sodium sulfide (Na_{2}S). This causes the chemical precipitation and thus immobilization of major contaminants.
- Phase 4: Circulation of the liquid by pumping and re- injection, to obtain uniform conditions in the whole former leaching zone.

But, even with this treatment scheme, various problems remain unresolved:

- Contaminants that are mobile under chemically reducing conditions, such as radium, cannot be controlled.
- If chemically reducing conditions are later disturbed for any reasons, the precipitated contaminants are re-mobilized.
- The restoration process takes very long periods of time, not all parameters can be lowered appropriately.

Most restoration experiments reported refer to the alkaline leaching scheme, since this scheme is the only one used in Western world commercial in-situ operations. Therefore, nearly no experience exists with groundwater restoration after acid in- situ leaching, the scheme that was applied in most instances in Eastern Europe. The only Western in-situ leaching site restored after sulfuric acid leaching so far, is the small pilot scale facility Nine Mile Lake near Casper, Wyoming (USA). The results can therefore not simply be transferred to production scale facilities. The restoration scheme applied included the first two steps mentioned above. It turned out that a water volume of more than 20 times the pore volume of the leaching zone had to be pumped, and still several parameters did not reach background levels. Moreover, the restoration required about the same time as used for the leaching period.

In USA, the Pawnee, Lamprecht, and Zamzow ISL Sites in Texas were restored using steps 1 and 2 of the above listed treatment scheme. Relaxed groundwater restoration standards have been granted at these and other sites, since the restoration criteria could not be met.

A study published by the U.S. Geological Survey in 2009 found that "To date, no remediation of an ISR operation in the United States has successfully returned the aquifer to baseline conditions."

Baseline conditions include commercial quantities of radioactive U_{3}O_{8}. Efficient in-situ recovery reduces U_{3}O_{8} values of the aquifer. Speaking at an EPA Region 8 workshop, on September 29, 2010, Ardyth Simmons, PhD, Los Alamos National Laboratory (Los Alamos, NM) on the subject "Establishing Baseline and Comparison to Restoration Values at Uranium In-Situ Recovery Sites" stated "These results indicated that it may be unrealistic for ISR operations to restore aquifers to the mean, because in some cases, this means that there would have to be less uranium present than there was pre-mining. Pursuing more conservative concentrations results in a considerable amount of water usage, and many of these aquifers were not suitable for drinking water before mining initiated."

The EPA is considering the need to update the environmental protection standards for uranium mining because current regulations, promulgated in response to the Uranium Mill Tailings Radiation Control Act of 1978, do not address the relatively recent process of in-situ leaching (ISL) of uranium from underground ore bodies. In a February, 2012 letter the EPA states, "Because the ISL process affects groundwater quality, the EPA’s Office of Radiation and Indoor Air requested advice from the Science Advisory Board (SAB) on issues related to design and implementation of groundwater monitoring at ISL mining sites."

The SAB makes recommendations concerning monitoring to characterize baseline groundwater quality prior to the start of mining operations, monitoring to detect any leachate excursions during mining, and monitoring to determine when groundwater quality has stabilized after mining operations have been completed. The SAB also reviews the advantages and disadvantages of alternative statistical techniques to determine whether post-operational groundwater quality has returned to near pre-mining conditions and whether mine operation can be predicted not to adversely impact groundwater quality after site closure acceptance.

== See also ==
- Heap leaching
- Hydraulic fracturing
- Mineral exploration
