= Beverley Uranium Mine =

Mine in South Australia

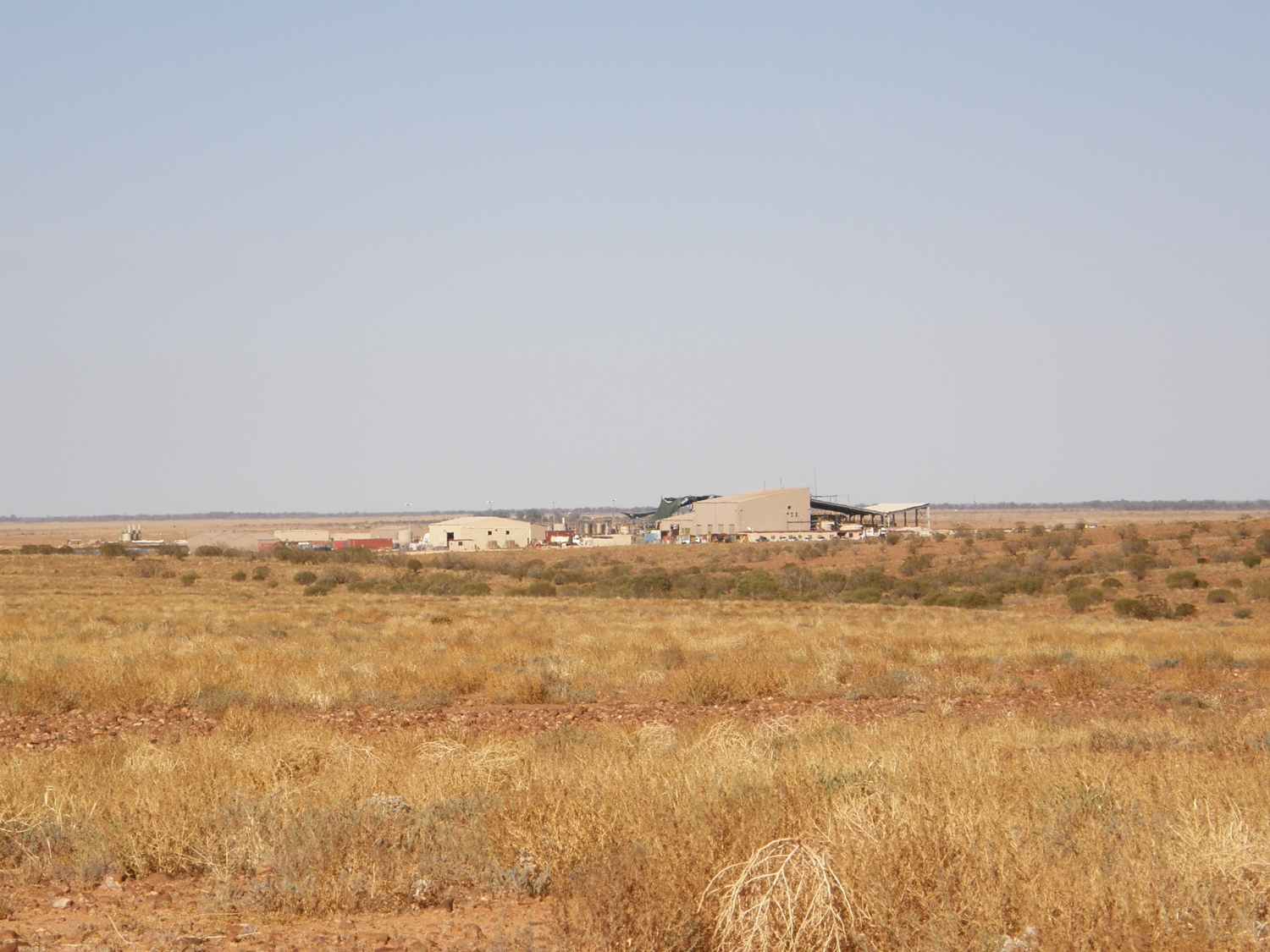
- Processing plant of the Beverley Uranium Mine

- Location in Australia

Location
- Location: Wooltana, South Australia, South Australia, Australia; 30°11′34″S 139°35′51″E

Production
- Products: Uranium

History
- Opened: 2001

Owner
- Company: Heathgate Resources Pty. Ltd.
- Website: www.heathgateresources.com.au

The Beverley Mine is Australia's third uranium mine and Australia's first operating in-situ recovery mine. It is located in South Australia in the gazetted locality of Wooltana about 35 km from Lake Frome at the northern end of the Flinders Ranges. It officially opened in 2001. The original Beverley uranium deposit was discovered by one of Bill Siller's companies in 1969 and was named after his wife—Beverley Siller.

The mine is owned and operated by Adelaide-based company Heathgate Resources Pty Ltd. Heathgate Resources is a wholly owned subsidiary of General Atomics.

Beverley is a palaeochannel uranium deposit. The uranium mineralisation (mainly coffinite) is hosted by loose sands in the channel of a former river. The ore bearing horizon is now at a depth of about 100 to 150m. The deposit is estimated to contain 21,000 tonnes of uranium oxide for a mine life of 15 to 30 years. Uranium is extracted by in-situ leaching, involving the injection of a fluid containing sulphuric acid and hydrogen peroxide into the ore-bearing permeable horizon to mobilise the uranium. The fluid is then recovered and uranium is extracted at a central plant using ion-exchange. The final concentrate is trucked to Port Adelaide and then shipped to international customers.

In August 2008, Federal approval was given to Heathgate for a greater area to be accessed for mining in order for the pre-approved volume of material to be extracted from the mine.

Between 1998 and 2007, Heathgate reported 57 spill incidents to Department of Primary Industries and Regions South Australia (PIRSA).

== Protesters awarded in Supreme Court ==
The project was protested against by the Australian anti-nuclear movement. A protest which occurred in May 2000 became the subject of public controversy and a protracted legal battle. The case was decided in the Supreme Court in 2010, after the Government of South Australia refused to settle on the matter. Ultimately, ten protesters were found to have been subjected to unnecessary force, including the use of batons and capsicum spray and nine adults were locked in a shipping container. Among the detainees was a cameraman, who claimed he was detained in the container for three hours. Multiple charges of assault and false imprisonment were laid against the South Australian Police, and $724,550 was awarded to the plaintiffs by Supreme Court Justice Timothy Anderson in April 2010. The judge also criticised Treasurer Kevin Foley and Police Minister Michael Wright for making antagonistic comments about the case, including Foley referring to the plaintiffs as "a bunch of feral protesters." The judge also referred to the protesters' false imprisonment as "degrading" and a breach of human rights. One of the plaintiffs, Lucinda White told The Advertiser after the trial:

"People have a right not to be bashed, beaten and falsely imprisoned by police. We have a right to protest. I am absolutely stunned this sort of thing can happen in South Australia.”

== Four Mile and Beverley North ==
In 2005, the Four Mile uranium deposit was discovered a few kilometres north-west of Beverley. The deposit is owned by Quasar Resources, (a 100% subsidiary of Heathgate), and Alliance Resources. Development of the deposit was approved in 2009. It is planned to do the final uranium extraction and concentrate production for Four Mile at the Beverley Plant.

The mine borders on the protected Arkaroola Wilderness Sanctuary that has previously been subjected to uranium mining. Following unprecedented public pressure, the South Australian government announced on 22 July 2011 that steps would be taken to ban mining and exploration in Arkaroola.

In 2009, additional deposits were discovered at Beverley North. Approval was granted to mine at Beverley North in 2011.

== See also ==
- List of uranium mines
- Sandstone uranium deposits
- Uranium mining in Australia
