= Honeymoon Uranium Mine =

Mine in South Australia

- Location in Australia
- Location: Kalkaroo, South Australia, South Australia, Australia; 31°44′27″S 140°39′44″E
- Products: Uranium
- Production: 37 tonnes
- Financial year: 2013-2014
- Opened: 2011
- Closed: 2013
- Company: Boss Resources Limited
- Website: https://bossresources.com.au
- Acquired: 2015

The Honeymoon Mine was Australia's second operating in-situ recovery uranium mine, beginning production in 2011. It is located in South Australia and is 80 kilometres (50 mi) northwest of Broken Hill, New South Wales.

Honeymoon is a sandstone-hosted paleochannel deposit. Operations at Honeymoon were suspended in November 2013, following difficulties in reaching production targets, high costs and a falling uranium price. The project was placed in care and maintenance, then sold by Uranium One (a 100% subsidiary of Rosatom State Atomic Energy Corporation) to Boss Resources and Wattle Mining (as of March 2018 a subsidiary of Boss) in September 2015 for a sum of A$9 million. Boss Resources anticipates resuming production at the mine in 2019.

== History ==
The Honeymoon deposit was discovered in 1972 by a joint venture (Minad-Teton-CEC JV) between Mines Administration (a subsidiary of CSR Limited), Carpentaria Exploration (subsidiary of Mount Isa Mines) and Teton Exploration Drilling Co (subsidiary of United Nuclear Corporation).

In 1981, Minad submitted a Final Environmental Impact Statement (EIS) to the South Australian and Commonwealth governments, and in 1982 established a $3.5 million demonstration 110 t/yr in-situ leach facility. The pilot plant comprised a pilot leach wellfield of three 5-spot leach patterns, a liquid disposal well, monitor wells, and a processing plant designed to treat pregnant leach solution at a rate of 25 liters per second. Before the pilot wellfield and the demonstration plant were commissioned, there was a change of government in both jurisdictions, approval to mine was deferred, and the project was placed in care and maintenance in June 1983.

Between 15 March 1999 and 9 August 2000, a second series of leach trials was conducted. In May 2000, another EIS was produced by Southern Cross Resources (the Australian subsidiary of SXR Uranium One Inc). A mining licence was issued in 2001 and miscellaneous purposes licences were issued in 2002 and 2008.

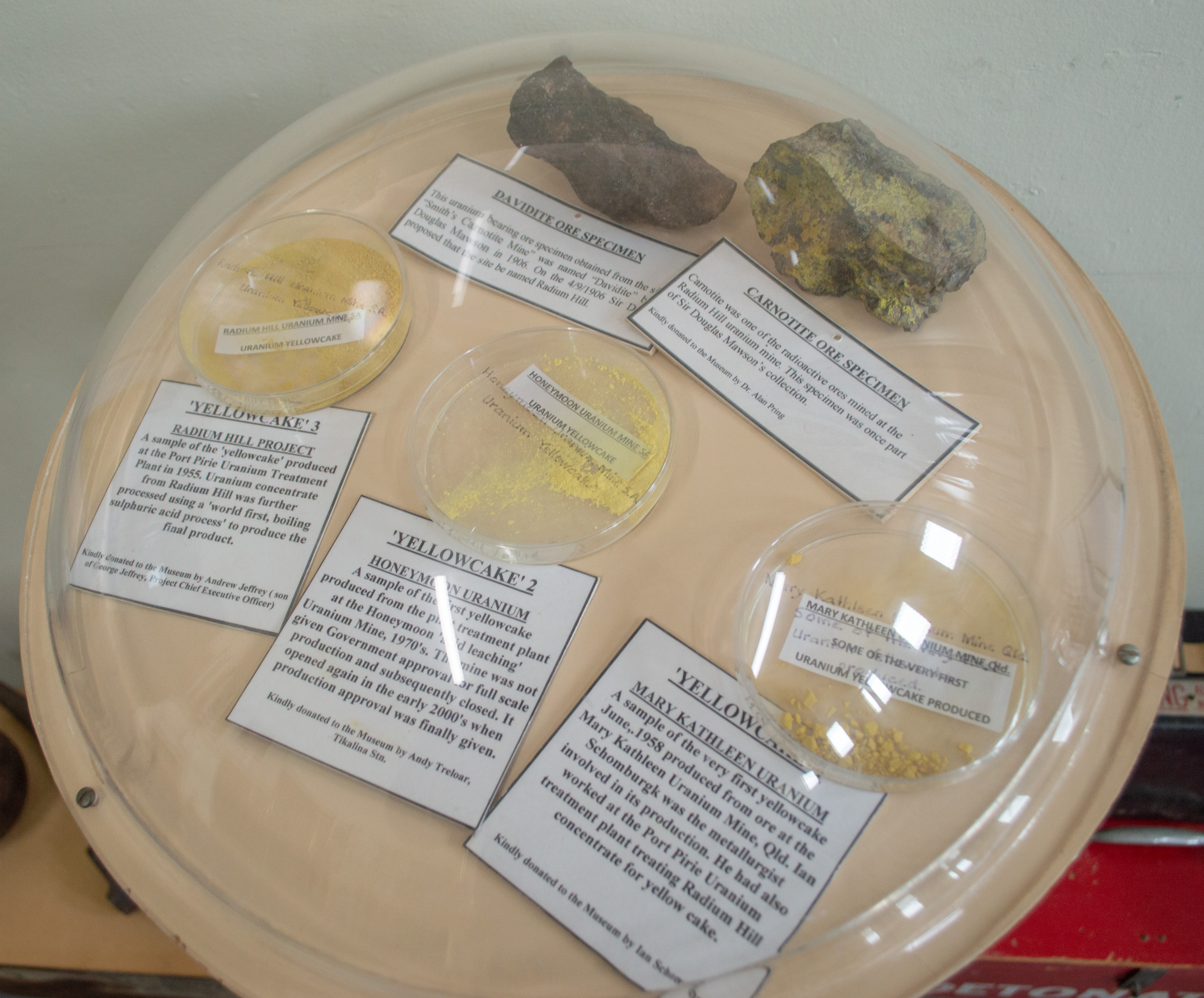
Yellowcake from Honeymoon (centre)

Construction of the Honeymoon mine commenced in late 2009 and was completed in 2011. Production from 2011 to 2013 was 312 tonnes of uranium. In November 2013 Uranium One announced "continuing difficulties in the production process and issues in attaining design capacity, combined with high mine operation costs." Honeymoon was shut down pending improved uranium prices and put on care and maintenance.

=== Ownership ===
In May 1988, total project ownership was transferred to Carpentaria's parent company, MIM Holdings, and in 1997 sold to Southern Cross Resources. Southern Cross Resources later became Uranium One Australia Pty Ltd. Uranium One Australia Pty Ltd was purchased by Boss Resources in 2015.

== See also ==
- Uranium mining in Australia
- List of uranium mines
- Sandstone uranium deposits
