= Yeelirrie uranium project =

Mineral deposit in Western Australia

- Location within Australia
- Location: Wiluna, Western Australia, Australia; 27°10′41″S 119°54′47″E
- Discovered: 1971
- Company: Cameco
- Website: https://www.camecoaustralia.com/projects/yeelirrie
- Acquired: 2012

The Yeelirrie uranium project is a uranium deposit located approximately 70 km southwest of Wiluna, in the Mid West region of Western Australia. The name Yeelirrie is taken from the local sheep station.

There are proposals to mine other uranium deposits in the Wiluna area: the Lake Maitland, Centipede, Millipede and Lake Way uranium projects.

== History ==
The Yeelirrie uranium deposit was discovered in mid-1971 by WMC Resources. WMC reached an agreement with Esso and the German Urangesellschaft Australia Pty Ltd in 1978 to co-finance the project, which was then scheduled for production by 1984.

Work on the mine development was underway by 1980 and trial mining was carried out. A pilot processing plant was established at Kalgoorlie in late 1980 and detailed metallurgical studies were undertaken from 1980 to 1982. A feasibility study for production at the rate of 2,500 tonnes (5.5 million pounds) of U_{3}O_{8} per year was completed in August 1982. There was also potential for 1,000 tonnes per year of vanadium oxide by-product.

The election of the Hawke government and the Australian Labor Party's Three mine policy put a stop to the project by 1983. Yeelirrie was placed in care and maintenance. Site rehabilitation was completed in 2003.

The project was acquired by BHP in 2005 when it acquired WMC Resources. BHP reactivated the project after the strongest uranium market in over 25 years and a 2008 change in government policy. BHP planned to start mining at Yeelirrie by 2014, producing approximately 80 tonnes (0.18 million pounds) of uranium oxide per week. The mine was expected to have a life of 20–40 years. Ore would be treated on site and then transported by road to Kalgoorlie, from where it would be railed to either South Australia or the Northern Territory, where there are established facilities to store and export uranium oxides.

BHP scaled back the production of the proposed mine in early 2010, from 5,000 tonnes (11 million pounds) per annum to 3,500 tonnes (7.7 million pounds) of U_{3}O_{8}, in part because a proposed additional acid heap leach circuit was deemed uneconomic due to high acid consumption.

The project came under criticism at BHP's 2010 annual general meeting from local Aboriginal groups regarding their concerns which included the employment of indigenous residents near BHP's mines in WA, and the need for reassurance from BHP that there would be minimal impact on the surrounding land at the planned mine. The local Wongutha people considered Yeelirrie as a "place of death", and that needed to be explored in heritage surveys.

In February 2011, an environmental impact survey found a total of 143 species from 70 genera were recorded, most of which were widespread and common in the region. The survey also discovered 3 new previously unknown species. One of these species, now known as Atriplex yeelirrie, was declared threatened and has a highly restricted distribution, only found in two known locations, approximately 30 km apart. The north western population (of an estimated 84,510 individuals) is located on ground that coincides with the central part of the proposed open pit mine. The south western population comprises an estimated 190,656 individuals and was unimpacted by planned developments.

In August 2012, BHP sold the project to Canadian mining company Cameco for US$430 million.

The Yeelirrie uranium project was granted environmental approval by the Western Australian Minister for the Environment in January 2017. An application to invalidate the decision was lodged by the Environmental Defenders Office on behalf of the Conservation Council of Western Australia and a small number of traditional owners. It did not challenge the merits of the environmental assessment, but rather disputed the Environmental Protection Act 1986 procedure and the ability of the Minister for the Environment to make approval decisions. This was rejected in February 2018. An appeal to the Western Australia Court of Appeal was dismissed in 2019. In April 2022, Environment Minister Reece Whitby denied an application to have the approval extended.

=== Reserves and resources ===
At 31 December 2018 the measured and indicated resource for the project was 58,100 tonnes (128.1 million pounds) of U_{3}O_{8}, with an average grade of 0.15% U_{3}O_{8}.
