= Jacqui Katona =

Jacqui Katona is a western-educated Aboriginal Australian woman who led the campaign to stop the Jabiluka uranium mine in the Northern Territory. In 1998 the Mirrar Aboriginal people, together with environmental groups, used peaceful on-site civil disobedience to create one of the largest blockades in Australia's history. Katona won the 1999 U.S. Goldman Environmental Prize, with Yvonne Margarula, in recognition of efforts to protect their country and culture against uranium mining.

== See also ==
- Energy Resources of Australia
- List of Australian inquiries into uranium mining
- Uranium mining in Kakadu National Park
- Uranium in the environment
- Women and the environment through history
