= Uranium ore =

Economically recoverable concentrations of uranium within the Earth's crust

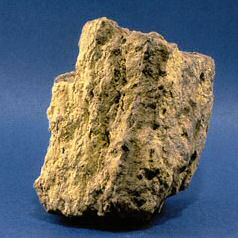
Sample of uranium ore

Uranium ore deposits are economically recoverable concentrations of uranium within Earth's crust. Uranium is a fairly common element in the Earth's crust, being 40 times more common than silver and 500 times more common than gold. It can be found almost everywhere in rock, soil, rivers, and oceans. The challenge for commercial uranium extraction is to find those areas where the concentrations are adequate to form an economically viable deposit. The primary use for uranium obtained from mining is in fuel for nuclear reactors.

Globally, the distribution of uranium ore deposits is widespread on all continents, with the largest deposits found in Australia, Kazakhstan, and Canada. To date, high-grade deposits are only found in the Athabasca Basin region of Canada. Uranium deposits are generally classified based on host rocks, structural setting, and mineralogy of the deposit. The most widely used classification scheme was developed by the International Atomic Energy Agency and subdivides deposits into 15 categories.

== Uranium ==
Uranium is a silvery-gray, weakly radioactive metallic chemical element. It has the chemical symbol U and atomic number 92. The most common isotopes in natural uranium are ^{238}U (99.274%) and ^{235}U (0.711%). All uranium isotopes present in natural uranium are radioactive and fissionable, and ^{235}U is fissile (will support a neutron-mediated chain reaction). Uranium, thorium, and one radioactive isotope of potassium (^{40}K) as well as their decay products are the main elements contributing to natural terrestrial radioactivity. Cosmogenic radionuclides are of less importance, but unlike the aforementioned primordial radionuclides, which date back to the formation of the planet and have since slowly decayed away, they are replenished at roughly the same rate they decay by the bombardment of Earth with cosmic rays.

Uranium has the highest atomic weight of the naturally occurring elements and is approximately 70% denser than lead, but it is not as dense as tungsten, gold, platinum, iridium, or osmium. It is always found combined with other elements. Along with all elements having atomic weights higher than that of iron, it is only naturally formed in supernova explosions.

== Uranium minerals ==
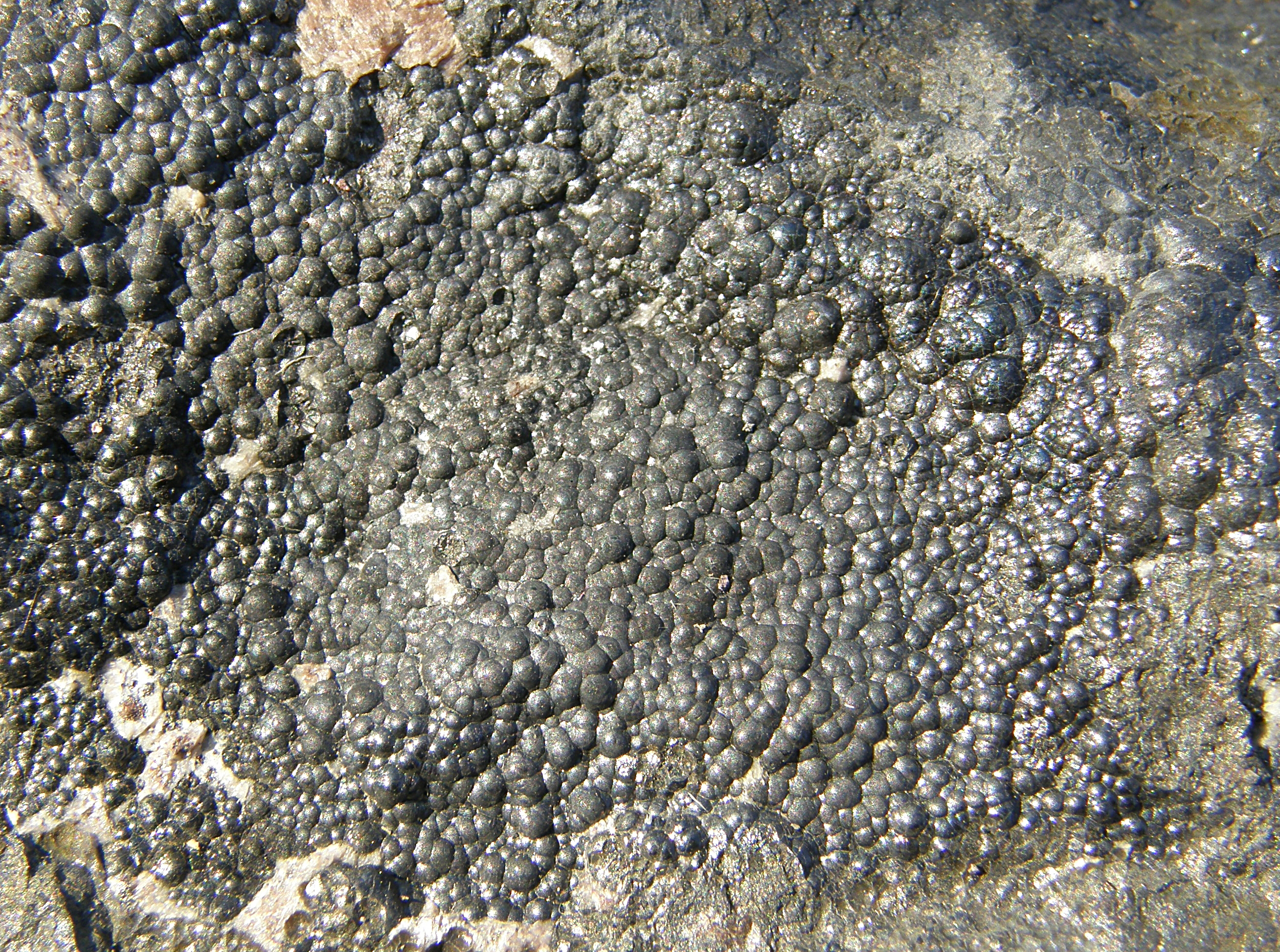
Uraninite, also known as pitchblende

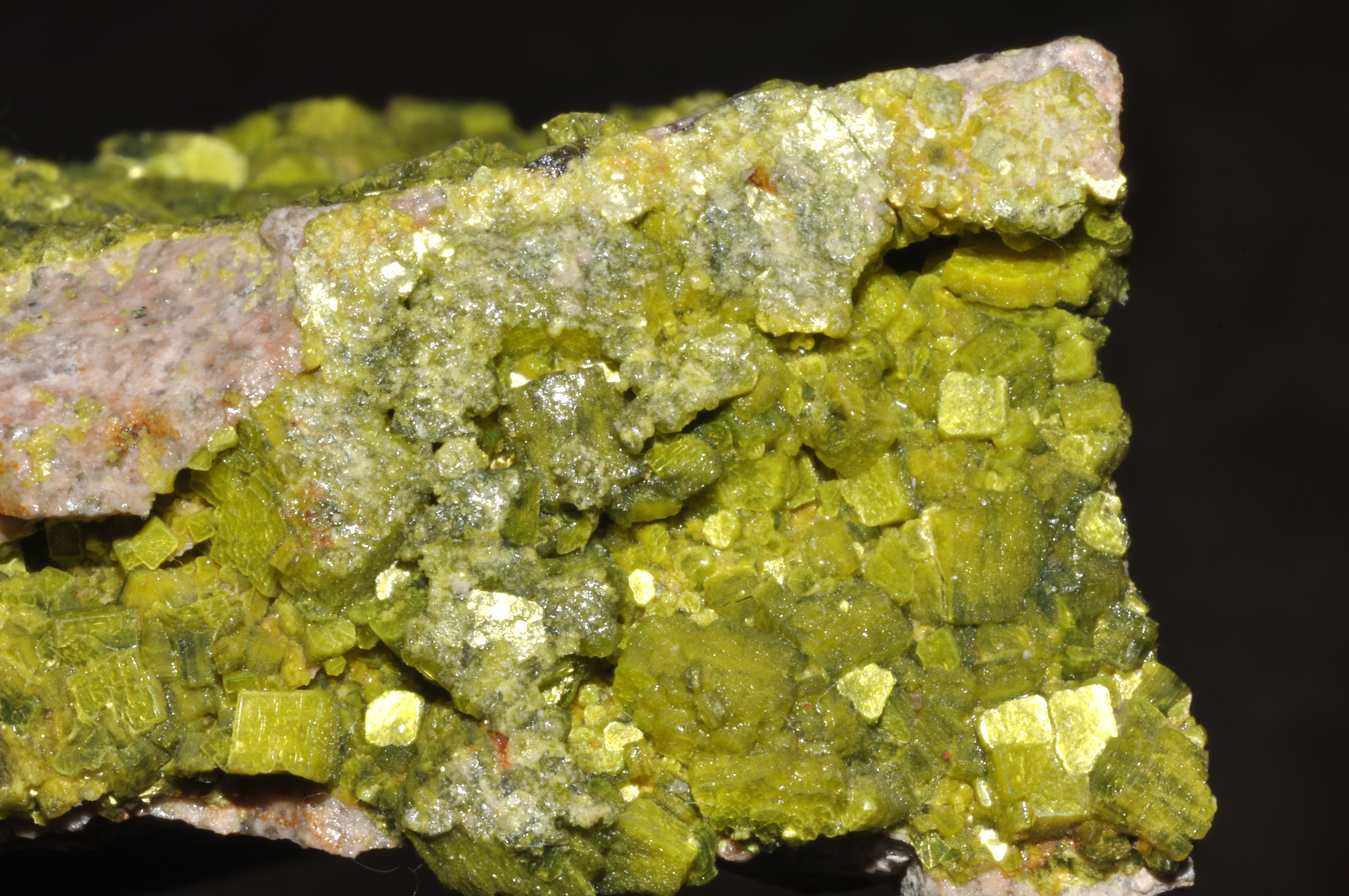
Autunite, a secondary uranium mineral named after Autun in France

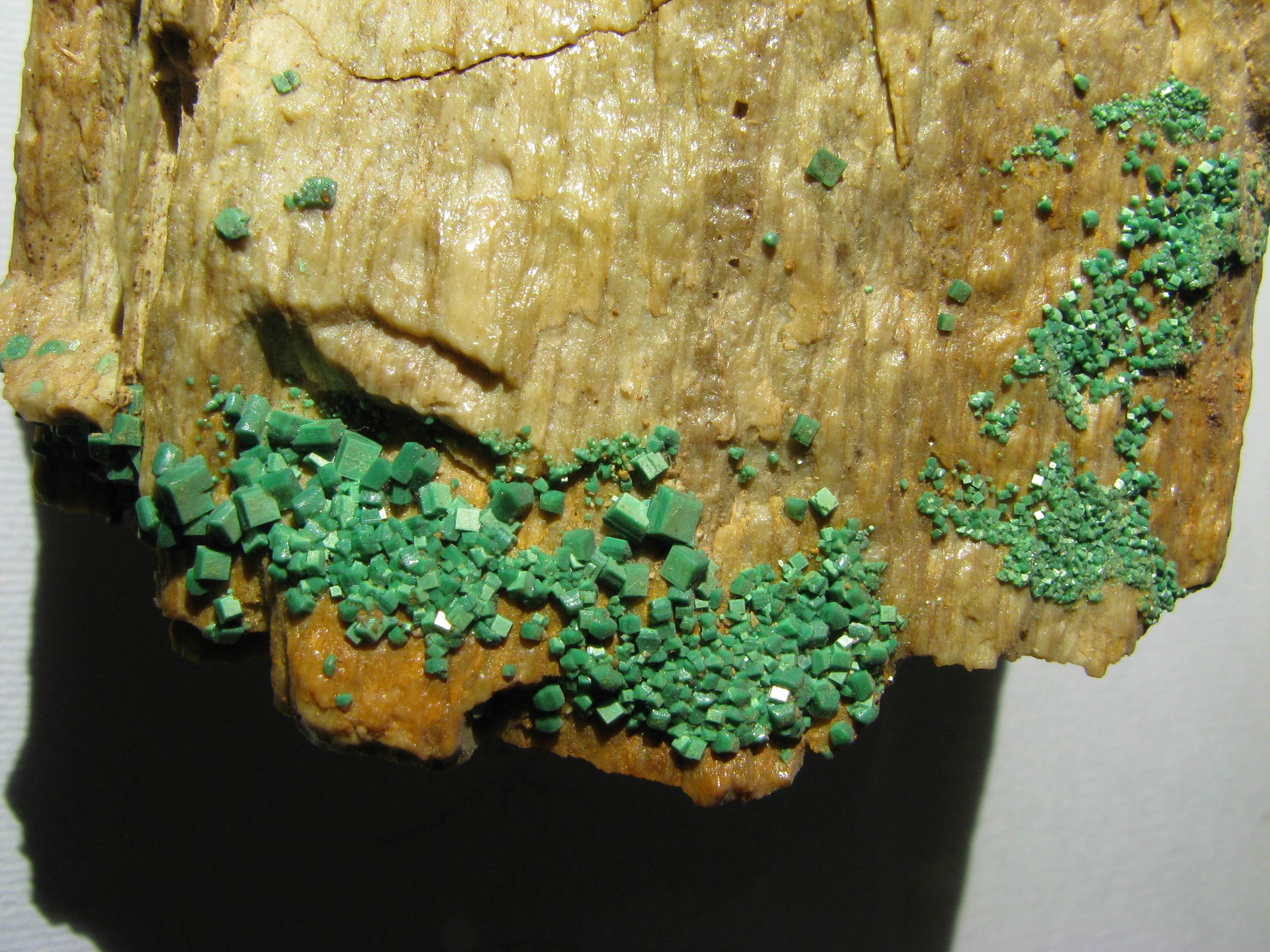
Torbernite, an important secondary uranium mineral

The primary uranium ore mineral is uraninite (UO_{2}) (previously known as pitchblende). A range of other uranium minerals can be found in various deposits. These include carnotite, tyuyamunite, torbernite and autunite. The davidite-brannerite-absite type uranium titanates, and the euxenite-fergusonite-samarskite group are other uranium minerals.

A large variety of secondary uranium minerals are known, many of which are brilliantly coloured and fluorescent. The most common are gummite (a mixture of minerals), autunite (with calcium), saleeite (magnesium) and torbernite (with copper); and hydrated uranium silicates such as coffinite, uranophane (with calcium) and sklodowskite (magnesium).

Uranium Minerals
Primary uranium minerals
| Name | Chemical Formula |
|---|---|
| uraninite or pitchblende | UO_{2} |
| coffinite | U(SiO_{4})_{1–x}(OH)_{4x} |
| brannerite | UTi_{2}O_{6} |
| davidite | (REE)(Y,U)(Ti,Fe^{3+})_{20}O_{38} |
| thucholite | Uranium-bearing pyrobitumen |
Secondary uranium minerals
| Name | Chemical Formula |
| autunite | Ca(UO_{2})_{2}(PO_{4})_{2} x 8–12 H_{2}O |
| carnotite | K_{2}(UO_{2})_{2}(VO_{4})_{2} x 1–3 H_{2}O |
| gummite | gum like mixture of various uranium minerals |
| saleeite | Mg(UO_{2})_{2}(PO_{4})_{2} x 10 H_{2}O |
| torbernite | Cu(UO_{2})_{2}(PO_{4})_{2} x 12 H_{2}O |
| tyuyamunite | Ca(UO_{2})_{2}(VO_{4})_{2} x 5–8 H_{2}O |
| uranocircite | Ba(UO_{2})_{2}(PO_{4})_{2} x 8–10 H_{2}O |
| uranophane | Ca(UO_{2})_{2}(HSiO_{4})_{2} x 5 H_{2}O |
| zeunerite | Cu(UO_{2})_{2}(AsO_{4})_{2} x 8–10 H_{2}O |

== Ore genesis ==
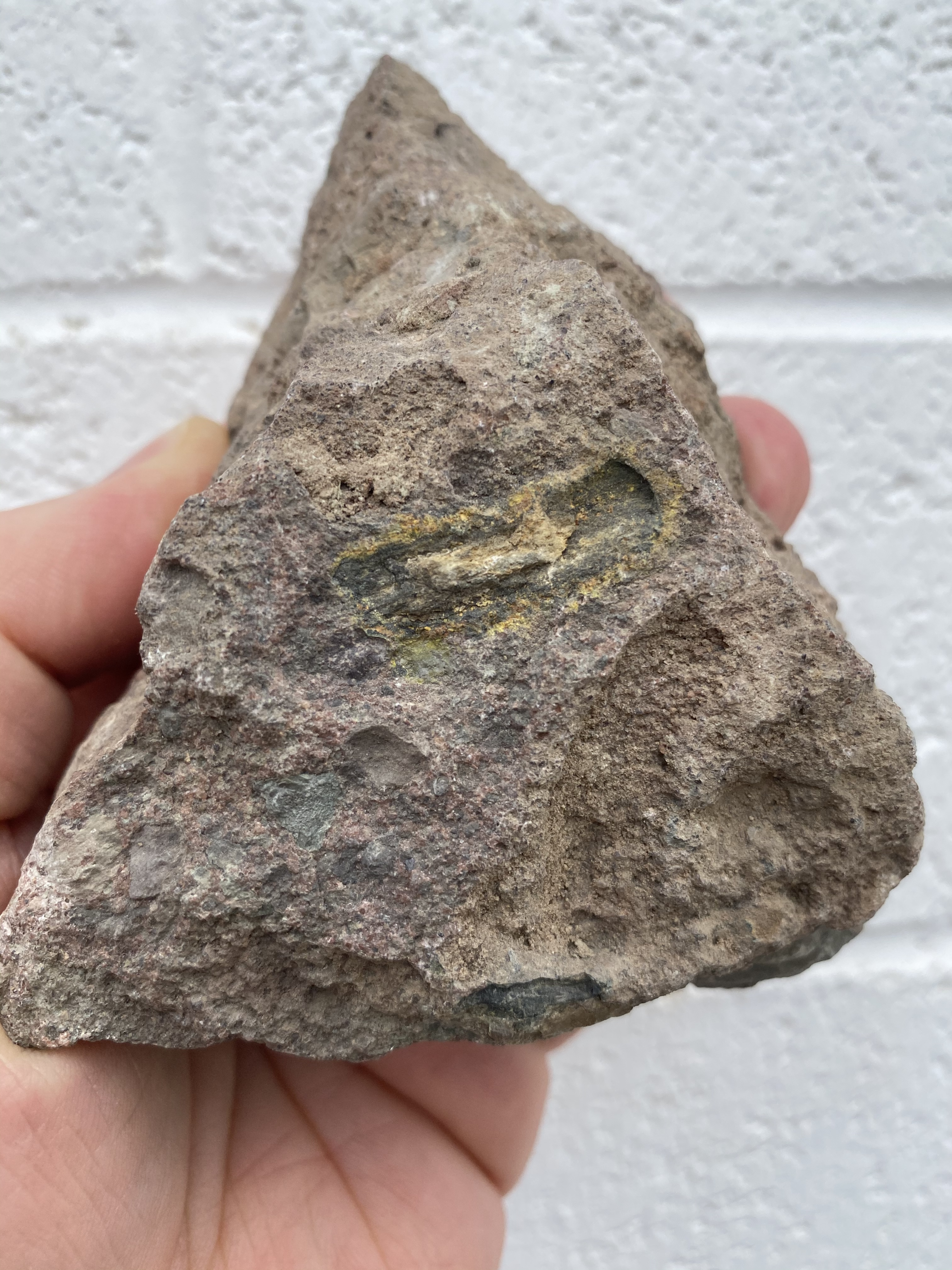
Wood fragment in a conglomerate from Utah, which has been partially replaced by pitchblende (black) and surrounded by carnotite (yellow)

There are several themes of uranium ore deposit formation, which are caused by geological and chemical features of rocks and the element uranium. The basic themes of uranium ore genesis are host mineralogy, reduction-oxidation potential, and porosity.

Uranium is a highly soluble and radioactive heavy metal. It can be easily dissolved, transported and precipitated within groundwater by subtle changes in oxidation conditions. Uranium does not usually form very insoluble mineral species, which is a further factor in the wide variety of geological conditions and places in which uranium mineralization may accumulate.

Uranium is an incompatible element within magmas, and as such it tends to become accumulated within highly fractionated and evolved granite melts, particularly alkaline examples. These melts tend to become highly enriched in uranium, thorium and potassium, and may in turn create internal pegmatites or hydrothermal systems into which uranium may dissolve.

While it was previously assumed that biological processes played little to no role in the formation of uranium ores, more recent research posits that some ore-bodies may have been significantly influenced by metal-reducing microorganisms such as Geobacter metallireducens, Geobacter uraniireducens or Shewanella oneidensis. These species are capable of using uranium-species as a terminal electron acceptor.

== Classification schemes ==
=== IAEA Classification (1996) ===
The International Atomic Energy Agency (IAEA) assigns uranium deposits to 15 main categories of deposit types, according to their geological setting and genesis of mineralization, arranged according to their approximate economic significance.

1. Unconformity-related deposits
2. Sandstone deposits
3. Quartz-pebble conglomerate deposits
4. Breccia complex deposits
5. Vein deposits
6. Intrusive deposits (Alaskites)
7. Phosphorite deposits
8. Collapse breccia pipe deposits
9. Volcanic deposits
10. Surficial deposits
11. Metasomatite deposits
12. Metamorphic deposits
13. Lignite
14. Black shale deposits
15. Other types of deposits

=== Alternate scheme ===
The IAEA classification scheme works well but is far from ideal, as it does not consider that similar processes may form many deposit types, yet in a different geological setting. The following table groups the above deposit types based on their environment of deposition.

Uranium Deposit Classification
| Uranium Transport / Precipitation Conditions | Deposit Type |
|---|---|
| Surface Processes / synsedimentary | Surficial deposits |
| Surface Processes / synsedimentary | Quartz-pebble conglomerate deposits |
| Surface Processes / synsedimentary | Phosphorite deposits |
| Surface Processes / synsedimentary | Lignite |
| Surface Processes / synsedimentary | Black shales |
| Diagenetic | Sandstone deposits |
| Diagenetic – Hydrothermal? | Unconformity-related deposits |
| Diagenetic – Hydrothermal? | Vein deposits |
| Diagenetic – Hydrothermal? | Collapse breccia pipe deposits |
| Magmatic – Hydrothermal? | Breccia complex deposits |
| Magmatic – Hydrothermal? | Volcanic deposits |
| Magmatic – Hydrothermal? | Metasomatite deposits |
| Magmatic – Hydrothermal? | Vein deposits |
| Magmatic – Hydrothermal? | Intrusive deposits |
| Metamorphic – Hydrothermal? | Metamorphic deposits |

== Deposit types (IAEA Classification) ==
=== Unconformity-related deposits ===
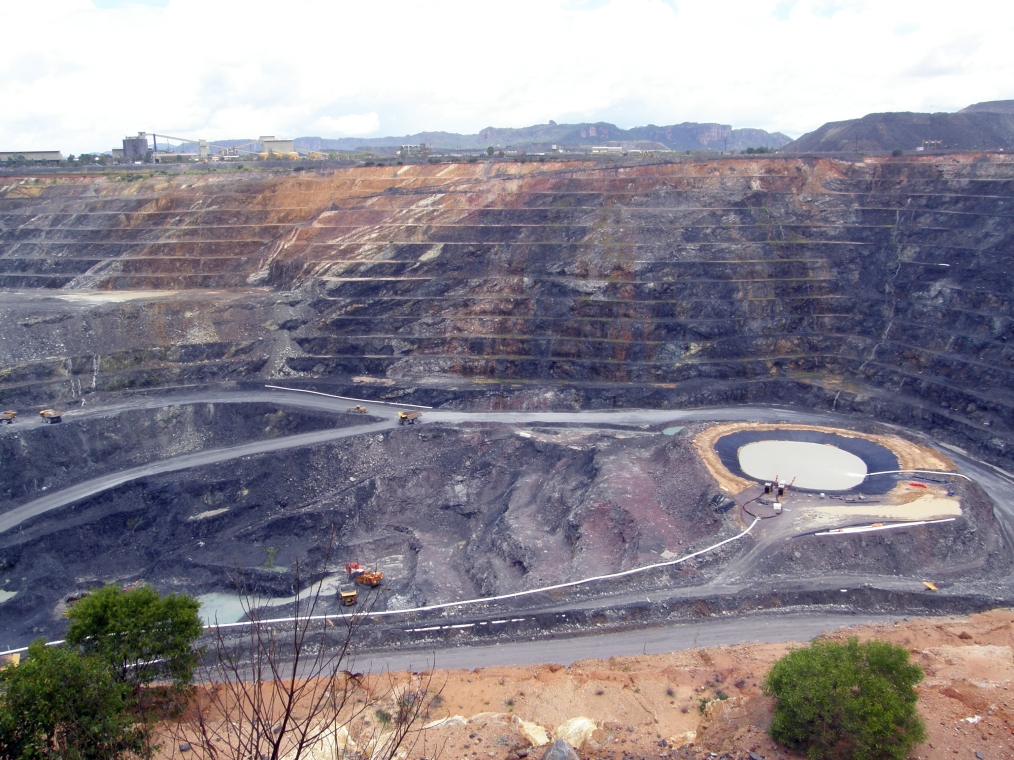
Ranger 3 open pit, Northern Territory, Australia: Uranium mineralised Cahill Formation as visible in the pit is unconformably overlain by Kombolgie sandstone forming the mountains in the background

Unconformity-type uranium deposits host high grades relative to other uranium deposits and include some of the largest and richest deposits known. They occur in close proximity to unconformities between relatively quartz-rich sandstones comprising the basal portion of relatively undeformed sedimentary basins and deformed metamorphic basement rocks. These sedimentary basins are typically of Proterozoic age, however some Phanerozoic examples exist.

Phanerozoic unconformity-related deposits occur in Proterozoic metasediments below an unconformity at the base of overlying Phanerozoic sandstone. These deposits are small and low-grade (e.g., Bertholene and Aveyron deposits in France).

==== Athabasca Basin ====
The highest grade uranium deposits are found in the Athabasca Basin in Canada, including the two largest high grade uranium deposits in the world, Cigar Lake with 217 million pounds (99,000 t) U_{3}O_{8} at an average grade of 18% and McArthur River with 324 million pounds (147,000 t) U_{3}O_{8} at an average grade of 17%. These deposits occur below, across and immediately above the unconformity. Additionally, another high grade discovery is in the development stage at Patterson Lake (Triple R deposit) with an estimated mineral resource identified as; "Indicated Mineral Resources" estimated to total 2,291,000 tons at an average grade of 1.58% U_{3}O_{8} containing 79,610,000 pounds (36,110,000 kg) of U_{3}O_{8}. "Inferred Mineral Resources" are estimated to total 901,000 tons at an average grade of 1.30% U_{3}O_{8} containing 25,884,000 pounds (11,741,000 kg) of U_{3}O_{8}.

==== McArthur Basin ====
The deposits of the McArthur River basin in the East Alligator Rivers region of the Northern Territory of Australia (including Jabiluka, Ranger, and Nabarlek) are below the unconformity and are at the low-grade end of the unconformity deposit range but are still high grade compared to most uranium deposit types. There has been very little exploration in Australia to locate deeply concealed deposits lying above the unconformity similar to those in Canada. It is possible that very high grade deposits occur in the sandstones above the unconformity in the Alligator Rivers/Arnhem Land area.

=== Sandstone deposits ===
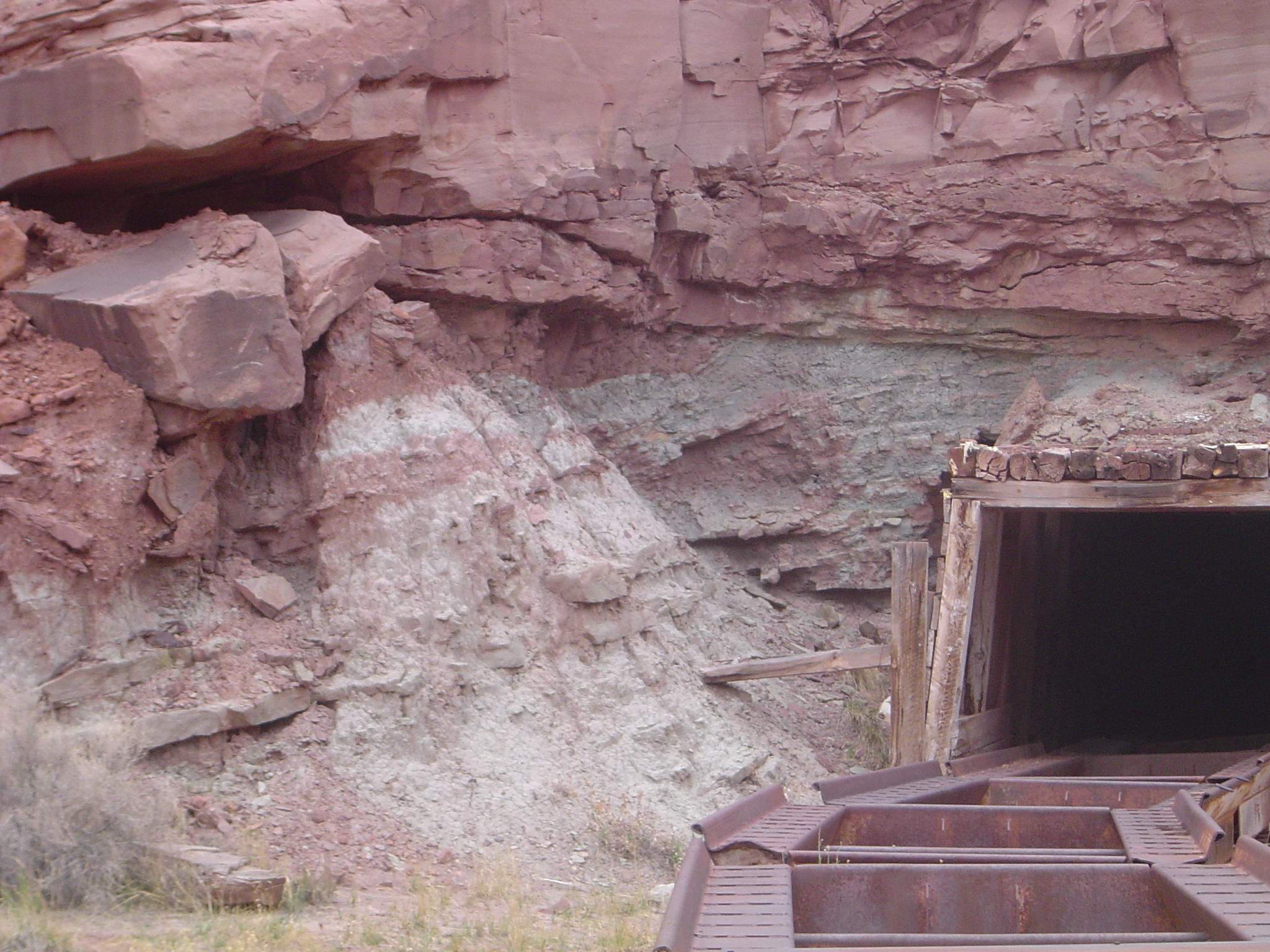
A uranium mine, near Moab, Utah. Note alternating red and white/green sandstone. This corresponds to oxidized and reduced conditions in groundwater redox chemistry. The rock forms in oxidizing conditions, and is then "bleached" to the white/green state when a reducing fluid passes through the rock. The reduced fluid can also carry uranium-bearing minerals.

Sandstone deposits are contained within medium to coarse-grained sandstones deposited in a continental fluvial or marginal marine sedimentary environment. Impermeable shale or mudstone units are interbedded in the sedimentary sequence and often occur immediately above and below the mineralised horizon. Uranium is mobile under oxidising conditions and precipitates under reducing conditions, and thus the presence of a reducing environment is essential for the formation of uranium deposits in sandstone.

Primary mineralization consists of pitchblende and coffinite, with weathering producing secondary mineralization. Sandstone deposits constitute about 18% of world uranium resources. Orebodies of this type are commonly low to medium grade (0.05–0.4% U_{3}O_{8}) and individual orebodies are small to medium in size (ranging up to a maximum of 50,000 t U_{3}O_{8}).

Sandstone hosted uranium deposits are widespread globally and span a broad range of host rock ages. Some of the major provinces and production centers include:

1. Wyoming basins
2. Grants District of New Mexico
3. Central Europe
4. Kazakhstan

Significant potential remains in most of these centers as well as in Australia, Mongolia, South America, and Africa.

This model type can be further subdivided into the following sub-types:

- tabular
- roll front
- basal channel
- structurally related

Many deposits represent combinations of these types.

==== Tabular ====
Tabular deposits consist of irregular tabular or elongate lenticular zones of uranium mineralisation within selectively reduced sediments. The mineralised zones are oriented parallel to the direction of groundwater flow, but on a small scale the ore zones may cut across sedimentary features of the host sandstone. Deposits of this nature commonly occur within palaeochannels cut in the underlying basement rocks. Tabular sandstone uranium deposits contain many of the highest grades of the sandstone class, however the average deposit size is very small.

==== Roll front ====
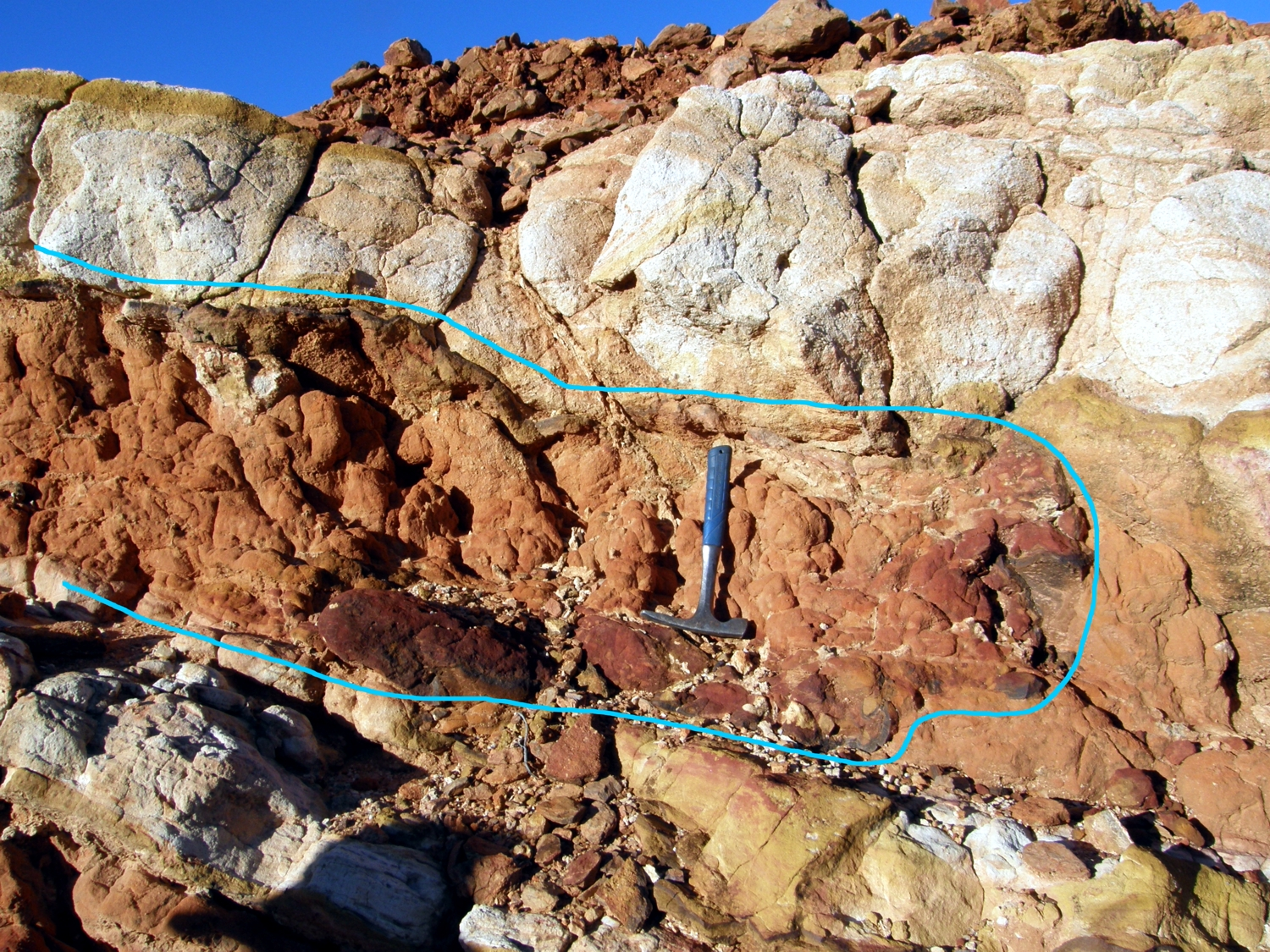
Structures interpreted as Palaeo-rollfronts in South Australia

Roll-front uranium deposits are generally hosted within permeable and porous sandstones or conglomerates. The mechanism for deposit formation is dissolution of uranium from the formation or nearby strata and the transport of this soluble uranium into the host unit. When the fluids change redox state, generally in contact with carbon-rich organic matter, uranium precipitates to form a 'front'.

The roll front subtype deposits typically represent the largest of the sandstone-hosted uranium deposits and one of the largest uranium deposit types with an average of 21 million lb (9,500 t) U_{3}O_{8}. Included in this class are the Inkai deposit in Kazakhstan and the Smith Ranch deposit in Wyoming. Probably more significant than their larger size, roll front deposits have the advantage of being amenable to low cost in situ leach recovery.

Typical characteristics:

- roll-front deposits are crescent-shaped bodies that transect the host lithology
- typically the convex side points down the hydraulic gradient.
- the limbs or tails tend to be peneconcordant with the lithology.
- most ore-bodies consist of several interconnected rolls.
- individual roll-front deposits are quite small but collectively can extend for considerable distances.

==== Basal channel (palaeochannel) ====
Basal channel deposits are often grouped with tabular or roll front deposits, depending on their unique characteristics. The model for formation of palaeochannel deposits is similar to that for roll front deposits except that the source of uranium may be in the watershed leading into a stream or in the bed load of the palaeochannel. This uranium is transported through groundwater and is deposited either at a reduced boundary or in ephemeral drainage systems such as those in deserts of Namibia and Australia; it is deposited in calcretised evaporation sites or even in saline lakes as the water evaporates.

Some particularly rich uranium deposits are formed in palaeochannels which are filled in the lower parts by lignite or brown coal, which acts as a particularly efficient reductive trap for uranium. Sometimes, elements such as scandium, gold and silver may be concentrated within these lignite-hosted uranium deposits.

The Frome Embayment in South Australia hosts several deposits of this type including Honeymoon, Oban, Beverley and Four-Mile (which is the largest deposit of this class). These deposits are hosted in palaeochannels filled with Cenozoic sediments and sourced their uranium from uranium-rich Paleoproterozoic to Mesoproterozoic rocks of the Mount Painter Inlier and the Olary Domain of the Curnamona Province.

==== Structurally related ====
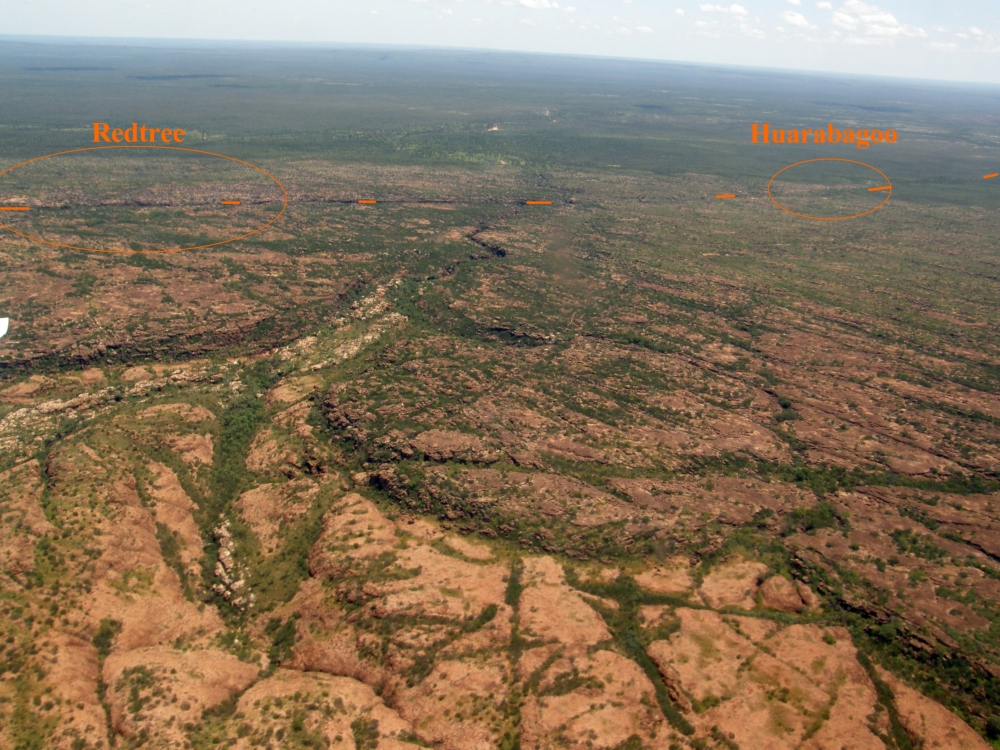
Westmoreland uranium deposit, Queensland, Australia: most of the orebodies (the positions of two of them marked) are hosted along the Redtree dolerite dyke (broken line) within the Paleoproterozoic Westmoreland conglomerate

Tectonic-lithologic controlled uranium deposits occur in sandstones adjacent to a permeable fault zone which cuts the sandstone/mudstone sequence. Mineralisation forms tongue-shaped ore zones along the permeable sandstone layers adjacent to the fault. Often there are mineralised zones 'stacked' vertically on top of each other within sandstone units adjacent to the fault zone.

=== Quartz conglomerate deposits ===
Quartz pebble conglomerate hosted uranium deposits are of historical significance as the major source of primary production for several decades after World War II. This type of deposit has been identified in eight localities around the world. The most significant deposits are in the Huronian Supergroup in Elliot Lake, Ontario, Canada and in the Witwatersrand Supergroup of South Africa. These deposits make up approximately 13% of the world's uranium resources.

Quartz pebble conglomerate hosted uranium deposits formed from the transport and deposition of uraninite in a fluvial sedimentary environment and are defined as stratiform and stratabound placer deposits. Host rocks are typically submature to supermature, polymictic conglomerates and sandstones deposited in alluvial fan and braided stream environments. The host conglomerates of the Huronian deposits are situated at the base of the sequence, whereas the mineralized horizons at Witwatersand are arguably along tectonized intraformational unconformities.

Uranium minerals were derived from uraniferous pegmatites in the sediment source areas. These deposits are restricted to the Archean and early Paleoproterozoic and do not occur in sediments younger than about 2,200 million years when oxygen levels in the atmosphere reached a critical level, making simple uranium oxides no longer stable in near-surface environments.

Quartz pebble conglomerate uranium deposits are typically low grade but characterized by high tonnages. The Huronian deposits generally contain higher grades (0.15% U_{3}O_{8}) and greater resources (as shown by the Denison and Quirke mines), however some of the Witwatersand gold deposits also contain sizeable low grade (0.01% U_{3}O_{8}) uranium resources.

==== Witwatersrand ====
In the Witwatersrand deposits, ores are found along unconformities, shale and siltstone beds, and carbonaceous seams. The West Rand Group of sediments tend to host the most uranium within the Witwatersrand Supergroup. The uranium rich Dominion Reef is located at the base of the West Rand Supergroup. The Vaal Reef is the most uranium rich reef of the Central Rand Group of sediments. Structural controls on the regional scale are normal faults while on the deposit scale are bedding parallel shears and thrusts. Textural evidence indicates that the uranium and gold have been remobilized to their current sites; however the debate continues if the original deposition was detrital or was entirely hydrothermal, or alternatively related to high grade diagenesis.

Uranium minerals are typically uraninite with lesser uranothorite, brannerite, and coffinite. The uranium is especially concentrated along thin carbonaceous seams or carbon leaders. Strong regional scale alteration consists of pyrophyllite, chloritoid, muscovite, chlorite, quartz, rutile, and pyrite. The main elements associated with the uranium are gold and silver. Gold contents are much higher than in the Elliot Lake type with U:Au ranging between 5:1 and 500:1, which indicates that these gold-rich ores are essentially very low grade uranium deposits with gold.

==== Elliot Lake ====
Sedimentological controls on the Huronian deposits appear to be much stronger than in the Witwatersrand deposits. Ores grade from uranium through thorium to titanium-rich with decreasing pebble size and increasing distance from their source. While evidence of post-diagenetic remobilization has been identified, these effects appear far subordinate to the sedimentological controls.

Ore consists of uraninite with lesser brannerite and thucholite. These occur in thin beds exhibiting graded bedding reminiscent of placer sorting. Alteration is nonexistent to very weak at best, and the weak chlorite and sericite are believed to be mainly post-ore effects. Other post-depositional alteration includes pyritization, silicification, and alteration of titanium minerals. The most prominent geochemical associations with the uranium are thorium and titanium.

This schematic model represents the original depositional setting. The Huronian underwent mild post-depositional folding during the Penokean orogeny around 1.9 billion years. The main regional structure is the Quirke syncline along the margins of which the majority of the known deposits are situated. Ore bodies range from subhorizontal to steeply dipping.

=== Breccia complex deposits ===
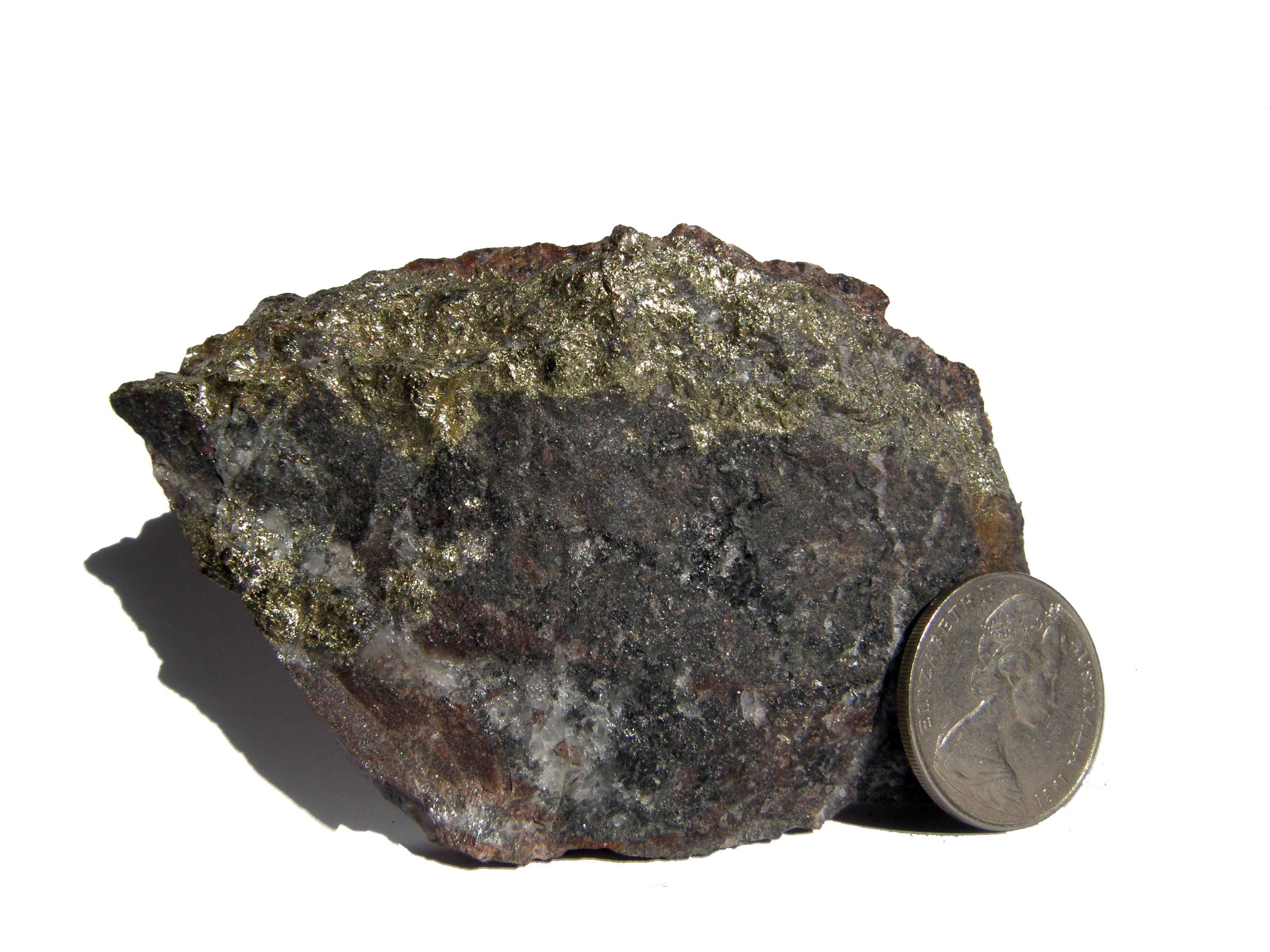
Chalcopyrite-rich ore specimen from Olympic Dam: copper-rich sections of the deposits are usually also rich in uranium

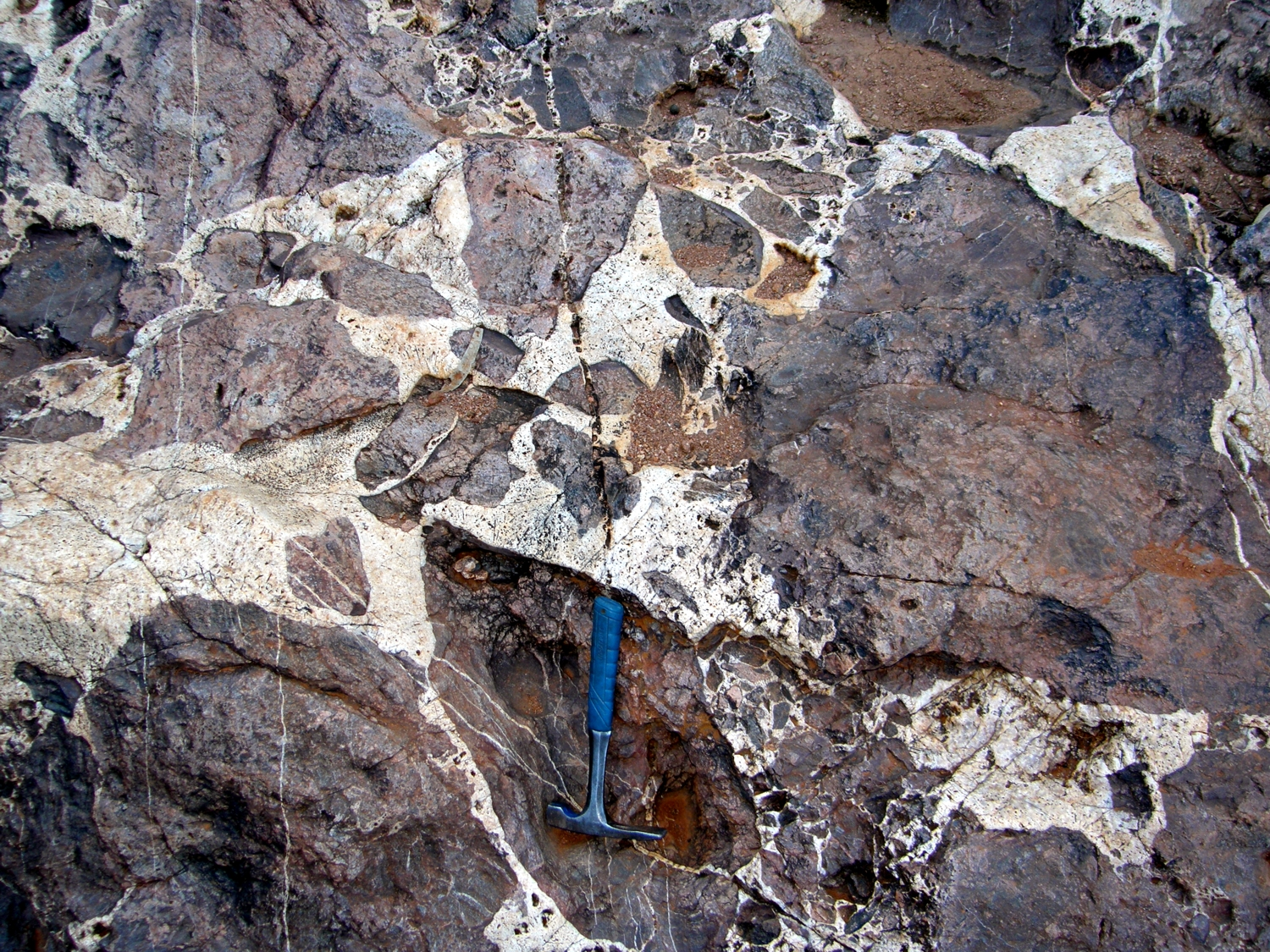
Uranium-rich breccia at Mount Gee, Mount Painter Inlier, South Australia

Only one iron oxide copper gold ore deposit is known to contain economically significant quantities of uranium. Olympic Dam in South Australia is the world's largest resource of low-grade uranium and accounts for about 66% of Australia's reserves plus resources. Uranium occurs with copper, gold, silver, and rare-earth elements in a large hematite-rich granite breccia complex in the Gawler craton overlain by approximately 300 metres of flat-lying sedimentary rocks of the Stuart Shelf geological province.

Another example for the breccia type is the Mount Gee area in the Mount Painter Inlier, South Australia. Uranium mineralised quartz-hematite breccia is related to Palaeoproterozoic granites with uranium contents of up to 100 ppm. Hydrothermal processes at about 300 million years ago remobilised uranium from these granites and enriched them in the quartz-hematite breccias. The breccias in the area host a low grade resource of about 31,400 t U_{3}O_{8} at 615 ppm in average.

=== Vein deposits ===
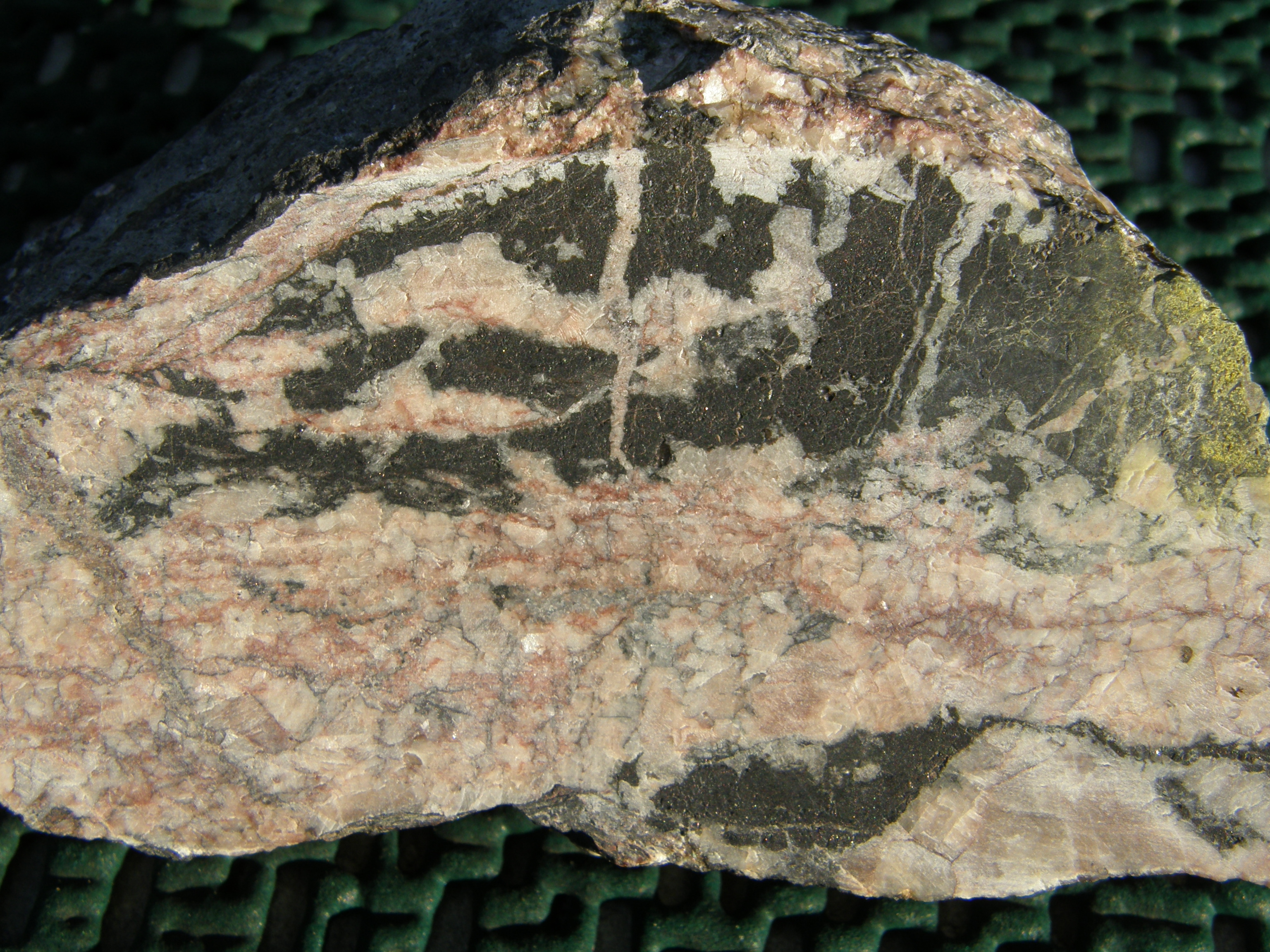
Uranium ore (pitchblende in dolomite) from the vein-type deposit Niederschlema-Alberoda

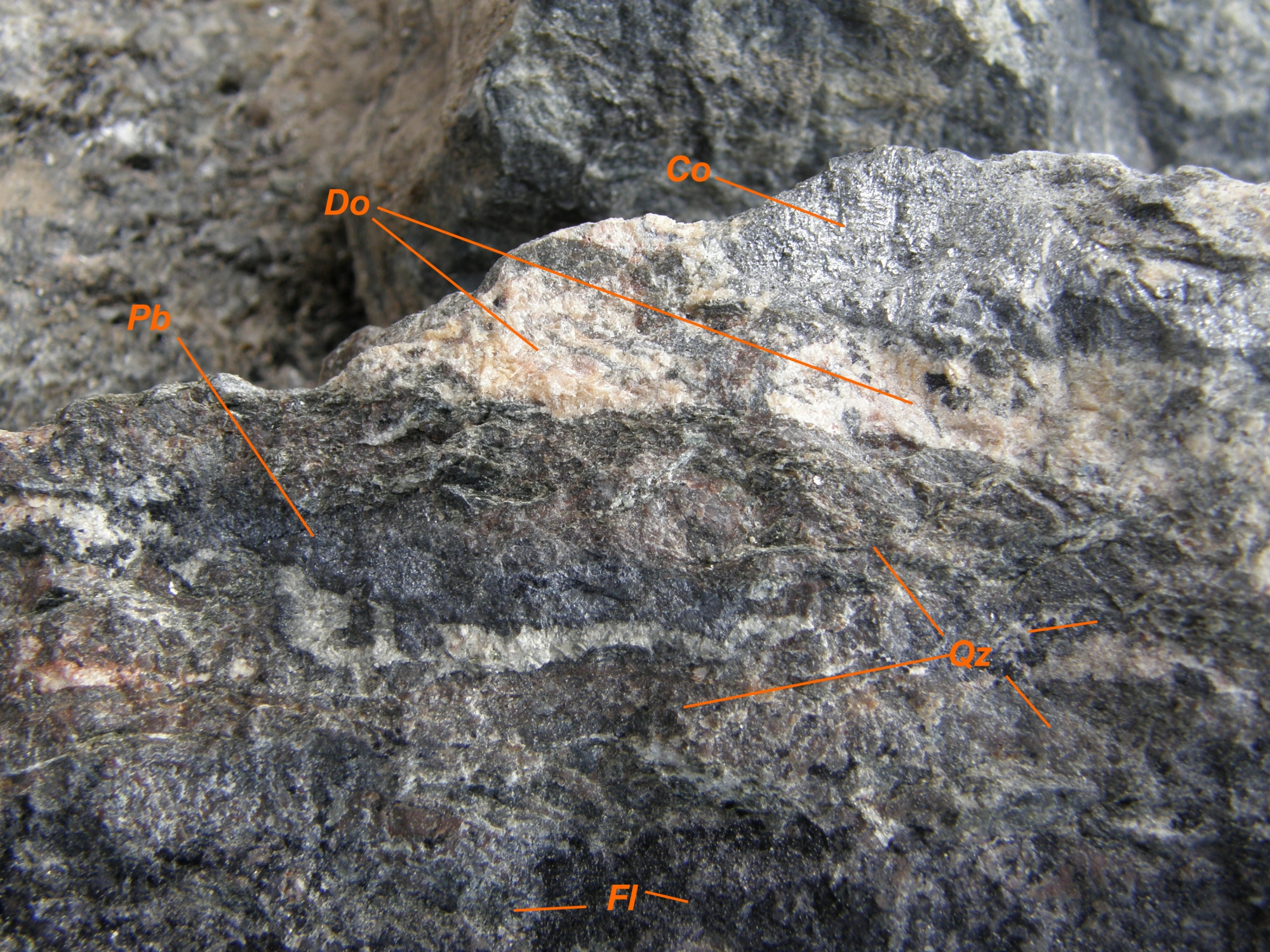
Polymetallic uranium ore, Marienberg, Ore Mountains, Germany

Vein deposits play a special role in the history of uranium: the term "pitchblende" ("pechblende") originates from German vein deposits when they were mined for silver in the 16th century. Franz Ernst Brückmann made the first mineralogical description of the mineral in 1727, and the vein deposit Jáchymov in the Czech Republic became the type locality for uraninite. In 1789 German chemist Martin Heinrich Klaproth discovered the element uranium in a sample of pitchblende from the Johanngeorgenstadt vein deposit. The first industrial production of uranium was made from the Jáchymov deposit, and Marie and Pierre Curie used the tailings of the mine for their discovery of polonium and radium.

Vein deposits consist of uranium minerals filling in cavities such as cracks, veins, fractures, breccias, and stockworks associated with steeply dipping fault systems. There are three major subtypes of vein style uranium mineralisation:

- intragranitic veins (Central Massif, France)
- veins in metasedimentary rocks in exocontacts of granites
  - quartz-carbonate uranium veins (Ore Mountains, Germany/Czech Republic; Bohemian Massif, Czech Republic)
  - uranium-polymetal veins (Ore Mountains; Saskatchewan)
- mineralised fault and shear zones (Central Africa; Bohemian Massif)

Intragranitic veins form in the late phase of magmatic activity when hot fluids derived from the magma precipitate uranium on cracks within the newly formed granite. Such mineralisation contributed much to the uranium production of France. Veins hosted by metasedimentary units in the exocontact of granites are the most important sources of uranium mineralisation in central Europe including the world class deposits Schneeberg-Schlema-Alberoda in Germany (96,000 t uranium content) as well as Příbram (50,000 t uranium content) and Jáchymov (~10,000 t uranium content) in the Czech Republic. Also they are closely related to the granites, the mineralization is much younger with a time gap between granite formation and mineralisation of 20 million years. The initial uranium mineralisation consists of quartz, carbonate, fluorite and pitchblende. Remobilisation of uranium occurred at later stages producing polymetal veins containing silver, cobalt, nickel, arsenic and other elements. Large deposits of this type can contain more than 1,000 individual mineralized veins. However, only 5 to 12% of the vein areas carry mineralization and although massive lenses of pitchblende can occur, the overall ore grade is only about 0.1% uranium.

The Bohemian Massif contains shear zone hosted uranium deposits with the most important one being Rozna-Olsi in Moravia northwest of Brno. At the time of its closure in 2017, Rozna was the last operating uranium mine in central Europe with a total uranium content of 23,000 t and an average grade of 0.24%. The formation of this mineralisation occurred in several stages. After the Variscan orogeny, extension took place and hydrothermal fluids overprinted fine grained materials in shear zones with a sulfide-chlorite alteration. Fluids from the overlying sediments entered the basement mobilising uranium and while uprising on the shear zone, the chlorite-pyrite material caused precipitation of uranium minerals in form of coffinite, pitchblende and U-Zr-silicates. This initial mineralisation event took place at about 277 million to 264 million years. During the Triassic a further mineralisation event took place relocating uranium into quartz-carbonate-uranium veins. Another example of this mineralisation style is the Shinkolobwe deposit in Congo containing about 30,000 t of uranium.

=== Intrusive associated deposits ===
Intrusive deposits make up a large proportion of the world's uranium resources. Included in this type are those associated with intrusive rocks including alaskite, granite, pegmatite and monzonites. Major world deposits include Rossing (Namibia), Ilimaussaq intrusive complex (Greenland) and Palabora (South Africa).

=== Phosphorite deposits ===
Marine sedimentary phosphorite deposits can contain low grade concentrations of uranium, up to 0.01–0.015% U_{3}O_{8}, within fluorite or apatite. These deposits can have a significant tonnage. Very large phosphorite deposits occur in Florida, Idaho, Morocco, and some middle eastern countries.

=== Collapse breccia pipe deposits ===
Collapse breccia pipe deposits occur within vertical, circular solution collapse structures, formed by the dissolution of limestone by groundwater. Pipes are typically filled with down-dropped coarse fragments of limestone and overlying sediments and can be from 30 to 200 metres (100 to 660 ft) wide and up to 1,000 metres (3,300 ft) deep. The primary ore mineral is pitchblende, which occurs as a cavity fill and coating on quartz grains within permeable sandstone breccias within the pipe. Resources within individual pipes can range up to 2500 tonnes U_{3}O_{8} at an average grade of between 0.3 and 1.0% U_{3}O_{8}. The best known examples of this deposit type are in the Arizona breccia pipe uranium mineralization in the US, where several of these deposits have been mined.

=== Volcanic deposits ===
Volcanic deposits occur in felsic to intermediate volcanic to volcaniclastic rocks and associated caldera subsidence structures, comagmatic intrusions, ring dykes and diatremes. Mineralization occurs either as structurally controlled veins and breccias discordant to the stratigraphy and less commonly as stratabound mineralization either in extrusive rocks or permeable sedimentary facies. Mineralization may be primary, that is magmatic-related or as secondary mineralization due to leaching, remobilization and re-precipitation. The principal uranium mineral in volcanic deposits is pitchblende, which is usually associated with molybdenite and minor amounts of lead, tin and tungsten mineralization.

Volcanic hosted uranium deposits occur in host rocks spanning the Precambrian to the Cenozoic, but because of the shallow levels at which they form, preservation favors younger age deposits. Some of the more important deposits or districts are Streltsovskoye, Russia; Dornod, Mongolia; and McDermitt, Nevada. The average deposit size is rather small with grades of 0.02% to 0.2% U_{3}O_{8}. These deposits make up only a small proportion of the world's uranium resources. The only volcanic hosted deposits currently being exploited are those of the Streltsovkoye district of eastern Siberia. This is in fact not a single stand-alone deposit, but 18 individual deposits occurring within the Streltsovsk caldera complex. Nevertheless, the average size of these deposits is far greater than the average volcanic type.

=== Surficial deposits (calcretes) ===
Surficial deposits are broadly defined as Tertiary to Holocene near-surface uranium concentrations in sediments or soils. Mineralization in calcrete (calcium and magnesium carbonates) are the largest of the surficial deposits. They are interbedded with Tertiary sand and clay, which are usually cemented by calcium and magnesium carbonates. Surficial deposits also occur in peat bogs, karst caverns and soils. Surficial deposits account for approximately 4% of world uranium resources. The Yeelirrie deposit is by far the world's largest surficial deposit, averaging 0.15% U_{3}O_{8}. Langer Heinrich in Namibia is another significant surficial deposit.

=== Metasomatite deposits ===
Metasomatite deposits consist of disseminated uranium minerals within structurally deformed rocks that have been affected by intense sodium metasomatism. Ore minerals are uraninite and brannerite. Th/U ratio in the ores is mostly less than 0.1. Metasomatites are typically small in size and generally contain less than 1000 t U_{3}O_{8}. Giant (up to 100 thousands t U) U deposits in sodium metasomatites (albitites) are known in Central Ukraine and Brazil.

Two subtypes are defined based on host lithologies:

- metasomatized granite; ex. Ross Adams deposit in Alaska; Novokostantynivka deposit in Kirovogradska oblast, Ukraine.
- metasomatised metasediment; Zhovta River and Pervomayske deposits in Dnipropetrovska oblast, Ukraine and Valhalla deposit in northwestern Queensland, Australia.

=== Metamorphic deposits ===
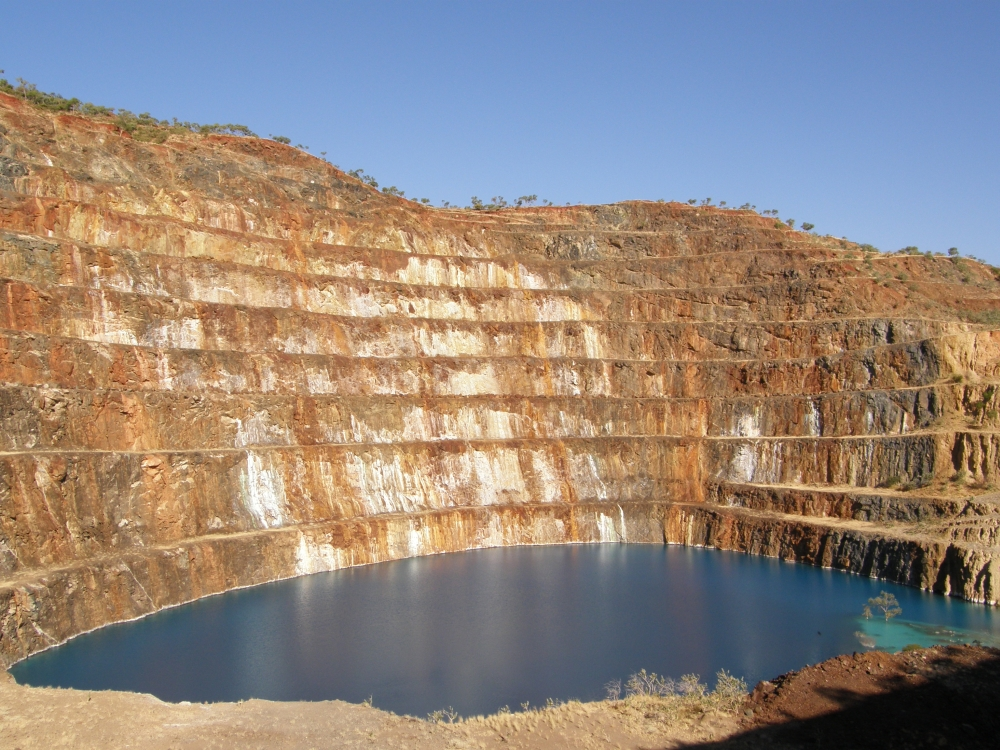
Abandoned open pit of Mary Kathleen uranium mine; the orebody is a skarn mineralisation enriched in U, Cu, Th and REE

Metamorphic deposits those that occur in metasediments or metavolcanic rocks where there is no direct evidence for mineralization post-dating metamorphism. These deposits were formed during regional metamorphism of uranium bearing or mineralized sediments or volcanic precursors. The most prominent deposits of this type are Mary Kathleen, Queensland, Australia, and Forstau, Austria.

=== Lignite ===
Lignite deposits (soft brown coal) can contain significant uranium mineralization. Mineralization can also be found in clay and sandstone immediately adjacent to lignite deposits. Uranium has been adsorbed onto carbonaceous matter and as a result no discrete uranium minerals have formed. Deposits of this type are known from the Serres Basin, in Greece, and in North and South Dakota. The uranium content in these deposits is very low, on average less than 0.005% U_{3}O_{8}, and does not currently warrant commercial extraction. When burned (e.g. in coal-fired power plants) the coal fly ash or bottom ash may contain a mass fraction of uranium high enough to be a concern as hazardous waste or to be potentially lucrative for extraction and sale. This is because the combustion process removes the carbon content as well as volatile elements, leaving non-volatile oxides behind.

=== Black shale deposits ===
Black shale mineralisations are large low-grade resources of uranium. They form in submarine environments under oxygen-free conditions. Organic matter in clay-rich sediments will not be converted to CO_{2} by biological processes in this environment and it can reduce and immobilise uranium dissolved in seawater. Average uranium grades of black shales are 50 to 250 ppm. The largest explored resource is Ranstad in Sweden containing 254,000 t of uranium. However, there are estimates for black shales in the US and Brazil assuming a uranium content of over 1 million tonnes, but at grades below 100 ppm uranium. Chattanooga Shale in the southeastern United States is estimated to contain 4 to 5 million tonnes at an average grade of 54 ppm.

Only the Ronneburg deposit in eastern Thuringia, Germany, has produced significant amounts of uranium. The Ordovician and Silurian black shales have a background uranium content of 40 to 60 ppm. However, hydrothermal and supergene processes caused remobilsation and enrichment of the uranium. The production between 1950 and 1990 was about 100,000 t of uranium at average grades of 700 to 1,000 ppm. Measured and inferred resources containing 87,000 t uranium at grades between 200 and 900 ppm are left.

=== Other types of deposits ===
- There are uranium deposits of other types in the Todilto Formation in the Grants District, New Mexico.
- The Freital/Dresden-Gittersee deposit in eastern Germany produced about 3.700 t of uranium from Permian hard coal and its host rocks. The average ore grade was 0.11%. The deposit formed in a combination of syngenetic and diagenetic processes.
- In some countries, for example China, trials are underway to extract uranium from fly ash.

== See also ==
- List of countries by uranium reserves
- List of uranium mines
- Nuclear fuel cycle
- Ore genesis
- Uranium mining
