= Ranger Uranium Environmental Inquiry =

Ranger Uranium Environmental Inquiry (RUEI) (also known as the Fox Report) was a committee established by the Whitlam government in Australia, which sought to explore the environmental concerns surrounding uranium mining. The Inquiry was established in 1975.

== Reports ==
The inquiry produced two major reports. The first report investigated broad issues around nuclear power such as should Australia be involved in nuclear power. The report was released in October 1976. It concluded that uranium mining could proceed safely if it was well regulated.

The second report investigated issues surrounding the establishment of the Ranger Uranium Mine. It concluded that indigenous land rights should be upheld and that a new national park be established. The national park was to be called Kakadu, with the Ranger, Jabiluka and Koongarra uranium projects deliberately excised from Kakadu. The federal government approved the mine due to the report. Mining operations began in 1980 and went on to become Australia’s longest running uranium mine. Recommendations were made in an effort to reduce environmental releases and the potential harmful impacts of radionuclides and heavy metals.

According to the National Archives of Australia:

The Inquiry found that if uranium mining was properly regulated and controlled, its hazards were not sufficient to prevent the development of the mines. The Inquiry recommended the establishment of a comprehensive system of environmental monitoring and research, overseen by a coordinating committee representing all the agencies involved, and chaired by a supervising scientist. It also recommended the granting of Aboriginal title to a substantial part of the region and the creation of a national park.

== See also ==
- List of inquiries into uranium mining in Australia
