= Uranium mining in Kakadu National Park =

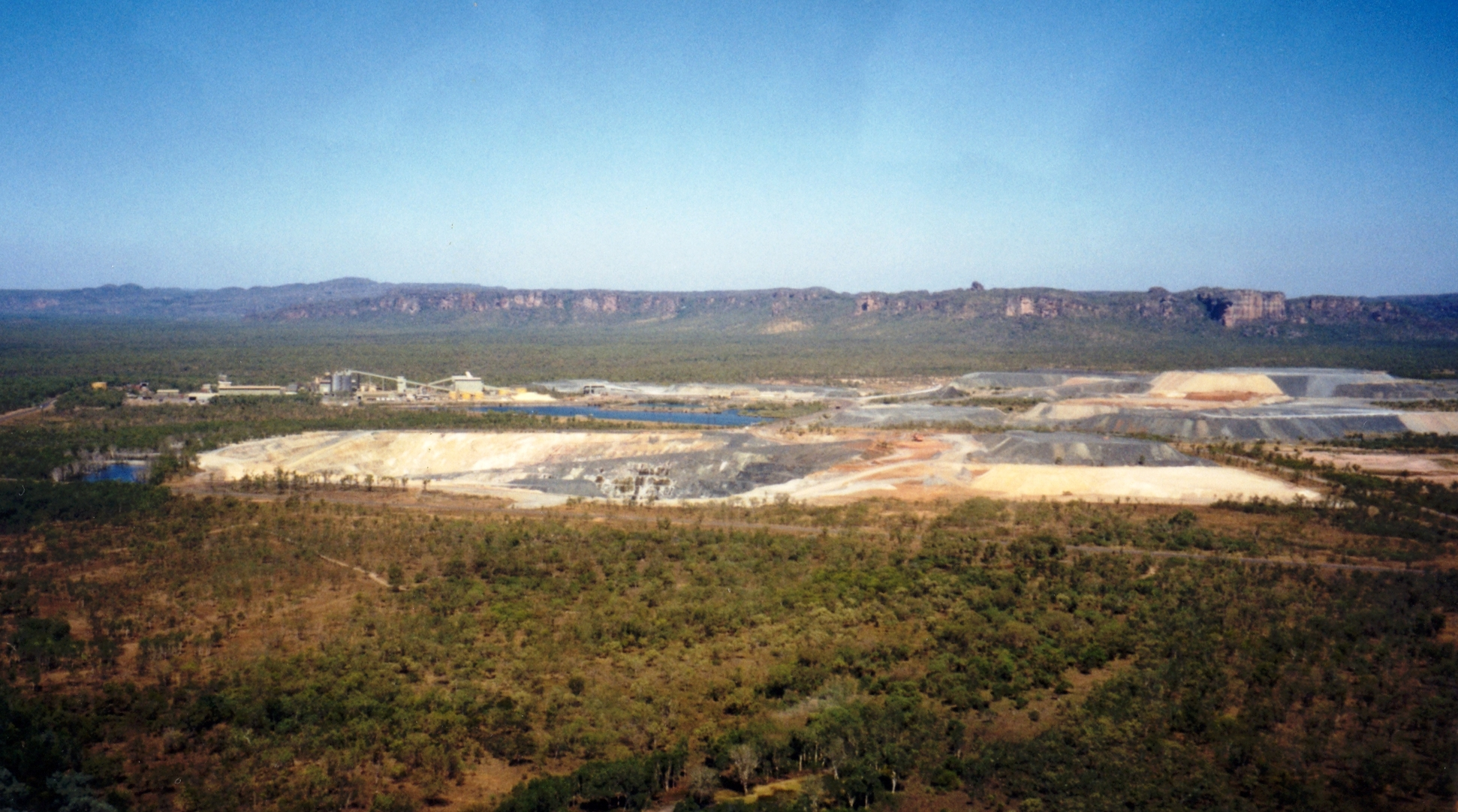
Aerial view of the Ranger Uranium Mine.

Kakadu National Park, located in the Northern Territory of Australia, possesses within its boundaries a number of large uranium deposits. The uranium is legally owned by the Australian Government, and is sold internationally, having a large effect on the Australian economy. The mining has been controversial, due to the widespread publicity regarding the potential danger of nuclear power and uranium mining, as well as because of objections by some Indigenous groups. This controversy is significant because it involves a number of important political issues in Australia: Native Title, the environment, and Federal-State-Territory relations.

Kakadu National Park is on the World Heritage List, both for its cultural and natural value, a rare feat because few sites are featured for both reasons.

There have been at least 150 leaks, spills and licence breaches at the Ranger Uranium Mine between 1981 and 2009.

== History of uranium mining in Kakadu ==
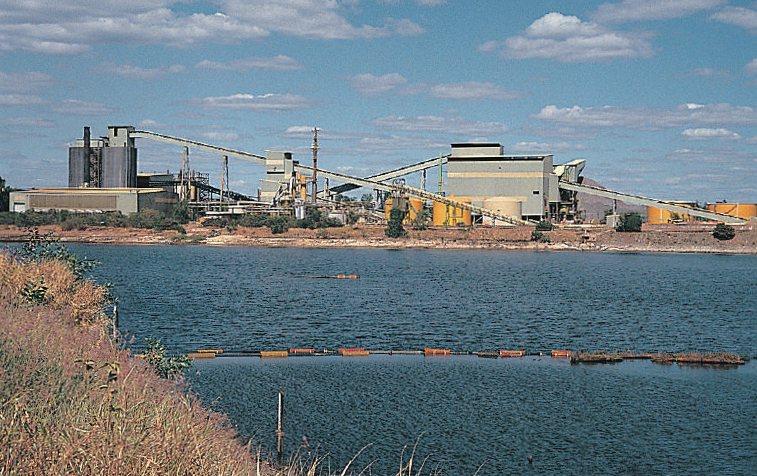
Ground view of the Ranger processing facilities.

Although exploration for uranium began in the Top End as early as 1944, the first uranium was found in Kakadu at Coronation Hill in 1953 by a geologist from the Commonwealth Bureau of Mineral Research. More uranium was found in 1954 and 1956 and small scale mining began in the years between 1956 and 1964. Much of this early ore was purchased by the British-American "Combined Development Agency" and the United Kingdom Atomic Energy Authority.

In the 1970s, many new deposits were discovered by aerial and ground surveys. After a series of studies and reports, the Commonwealth of Australia and the Northern Land Council, which represented the traditional Aboriginal land owners, reached an agreement on mining, and in 1980 the Ranger Uranium Mine was completed on land owned by the Kakadu Land Trust. Technically the site of the Ranger mine and the adjacent Jabiluka area are not part of Kakadu National Park, but are completely surrounded by it, as they were specifically excluded when the park was established from 1981.

Energy Resources of Australia (ERA) pays 4.25% of its gross sales revenue plus an annual rental of $200,000 for the use of the land and Ranger has paid over $200 million in royalties since 1980. The money is paid to the Commonwealth Government and ultimately distributed to Northern Territory-based Aboriginal groups, including the Traditional Owners, under the terms of the Commonwealth's Aboriginal Land Rights (NT) Act of 1976.

Following a lengthy and exhausting negotiation process, Indigenous leaders agreed in 1981 to terms with Pancontinental Mining to allow the construction of an underground uranium mine at Jabiluka. Scepticism remains to this day over the fairness of this agreement. Some suggest that indigenous leaders were worn down by the negotiation process and compromised in order for it to be finished. Jabiluka was bought by Energy Resources of Australia (owners of the nearby Ranger mine) in 1991. Attempts to develop the mine later in the decade were halted by the Gundjeihmi Aboriginal Corporation through a combination of blockading and legal action.

In 1998, UNESCO's World Heritage Committee announced that they proposed to list the park as "in danger" because of uranium mining, but this tag was not applied after a subsequent analysis by the World Heritage Committee when the Environment Minister, Robert Hill observed that many world heritage areas have mining and other extractive industries in or adjacent to them. Both the Ranger mine and the Jabiluka mining lease predate the national park and world heritage area.

In 1999, the UNESCO's World Heritage Committee held their third extraordinary session "to decide whether to immediately inscribe Kakadu National Park [Australia] on the List of World Heritage in Danger." The proposal was turned down by the large majority of the Committee who saw that the threat was not urgent enough, therefore the sovereignty of Australia must be respected. The committee could only "expresses its deep regret" that the voluntary suspension of construction of the mine decline at Jabiluka has not taken place, and was "gravely concerned" about the serious impacts to the living cultural values of the park. Following action by the Gundjeihmi Aboriginal Corporation, Rio Tinto, who had taken over the licence from ERA, cancelled the project in 2001 and rehabilitation of the site was completed in 2015. Mining at Ranger ended in 2021.

== Expansion of Park ==
In 2010, Jeffrey Lee, an Aboriginal landowner, offered thousands of hectares of his land to the Federal Government on the condition that it be added to Kakadu National Park. The land is rich in undeveloped uranium deposits, which could be worth billions of dollars.

== Controversy regarding uranium mining ==
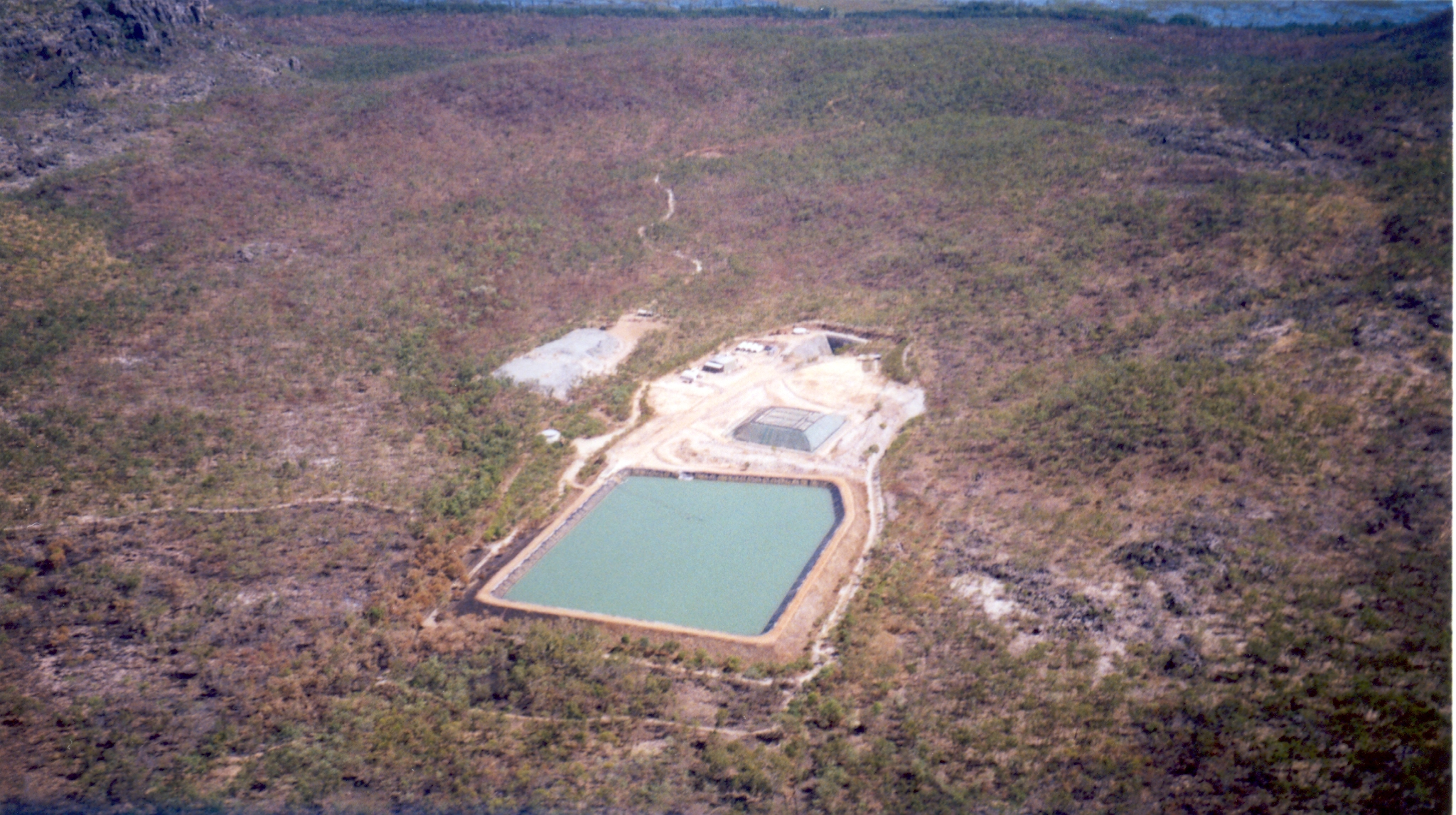
The Jabiluka site.

The United Nations voiced its official opinion the mine would not endanger the environment or traditional sites:

The United Nations Educational, Scientific and Cultural Organisation (UNESCO) ruled against placing the World Heritage-listed Kakadu National Park on its "in danger" list after accepting assurances the mine would neither harm its environment nor endanger sacred Aboriginal sites.

Concern at Kakadu is that mine tailings and contaminated water may impact Aboriginal water and food supplies, with health consequences for local indigenous groups. Chief Justice of the Northern Territory Brian Martin disagrees, however, and has voiced that there would be no harm to the environment. Research and monitoring conducted since 1978 by the Australian Government's Supervising Scientist for the Alligator Rivers Region has indicated that uranium mining at Ranger has not resulted in any harm to the environment of Kakadu National Park.

There have been more than 150 leaks, spills and licence breaches at the Ranger uranium mine since it opened in 1981. In 2004, a number of mining workers in Kakadu became ill after potable water at the mine site became contaminated with process water. As of March 2009, the Ranger uranium mine is leaking 100,000 litres per day of contaminated water into the ground beneath the Kakadu National Park, according to a government appointed scientist. Energy Resources of Australia has been repeatedly warned about its management of the mine.

== Benefits of uranium mining ==
The benefits to Australia of uranium mining in Kakadu are mainly economic. Australia possesses 24% of the world's uranium deposits, and the potential to export this uranium would benefit the Australian economy.

From 2000 to 2005 nearly 50,000 metric tonnes of uranium oxide were exported from Australia to eleven countries. This brought over A$2.1 billion to the Australian economy.

Opponents of uranium mining in the Alligator Rivers region claim that these benefits have not reached local communities of traditional land owners, who remain poorly resourced, under-employed, and economically disadvantaged. In contrast, official Australian Government reports state that there have been many benefits brought to Aboriginal communities:

Since agreement was reached with traditional owners in 1978, a total of $145.8 million in payments has been made to Aboriginal interests, of which $1.9 million was in up front payments; $3.4 million was in rental payments and $140.5 million was in royalty equivalent payments.
The proposed Jabiluka mine has already generated $5.2 million in benefits for Aboriginal people. While no production-based royalties can be paid before production commences, it is expected that over its life, the Jabiluka mine will contribute a further $230 million to Aboriginal interests.

== See also ==
- Anti-nuclear movement in Australia
- List of Australian inquiries into uranium mining
- List of Australian political controversies
- Nuclear Non-Proliferation Treaty
- Uranium mining in Australia
- Uranium in the environment
- World Uranium Hearing
- Depression glass
- Uranium tile
