= Yvonne Margarula =

Australian environmentalist

Yvonne Margarula is the Senior Traditional Owner and leader of the Mirarr people in the north of the Northern Territory of Australia.

She is an Aboriginal Australian environmentalist who won the 1998 Friends of the Earth International Environment Award and the 1998 Nuclear-Free Future Award. She also won the 1999 US Goldman Environmental Prize, with Jacqui Katona, in recognition of efforts to protect their Country and culture against uranium mining.

== Protests ==
The Mirrar, an Aboriginal Australian people, led by Margarula and Katona, mounted a large campaign in opposition to the proposed Jabiluka uranium mine in the Northern Territory of Australia. They used legal action and education to gain national and international support. In March 1998 the Mirarr, together with environmental organizations, used massive on-site civil disobedience to create one of the largest blockades in Australia's history. Over several months, approximately 5,000 people from across Australia and around the world travelled to the remote camp to protest with the Mirarr people. In July the land was cleared by Energy Resources of Australia and construction of the entrance to the Jabiluka mine began; however, protesters intervened and about 550 were arrested, including Margarula and Katona.

In 2011, Margarula wrote a public letter to Ban Ki-moon, Secretary-General of the United Nations, expressing sorrow that uranium from Mirarr land was used in the Fukushima plant.

In 2024, Yvonne Margarula was permitted to join the ongoing legal battle as the representative of the Mirrar people, to safeguard Jabiluka from uranium mining by Energy Resources of Australia (ERA). This development follows the Northern Territory government's initial denial of ERA's lease renewal request, which was based on conservation plans for Kakadu National Park.

== See also ==
- List of Australian inquiries into uranium mining
- List of Nuclear-Free Future Award recipients
- Uranium in the environment
- Uranium mining in Kakadu National Park
- Women and the environment through history
