= Energy Resources of Australia =

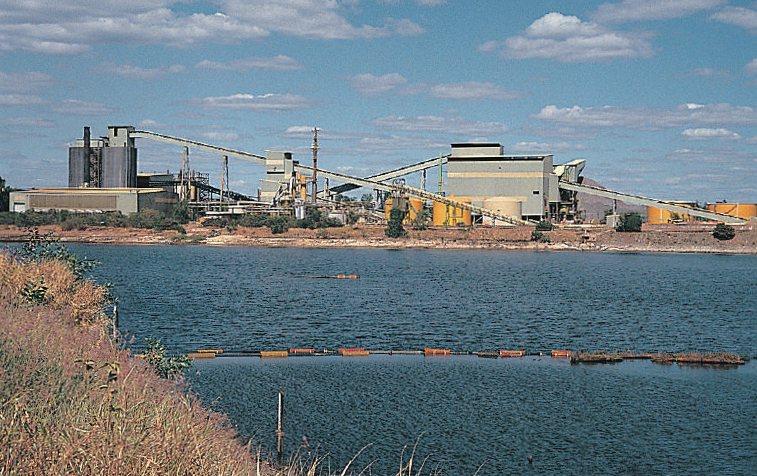
The Ranger uranium mine of Energy Resources of Australia

Energy Resources of Australia Ltd (ASX: ERA) is a public company based in Australia. It is a subsidiary of the Rio Tinto Group, which as of 2025 owns 98.43% of the company. The remainder is publicly held and traded on the Australian Securities Exchange (ASX). The chairman is Peter McMahon and the Chief Executive is Andrea Sutton.

== Production and sales ==
ERA is one of the largest uranium producers in the world, through the Ranger Uranium Mine in the Northern Territory. Ranger mine is located near Jabiru, 260 km from Darwin in the Northern Territory. ERA sells its product to electric utilities in Asia, Europe and North America through an arrangement with Rio Tinto Uranium, which provides expertise in global uranium sales and marketing activities. Australia exports of uranium oxide are subject to strict safeguards and non-proliferation conditions to ensure that Australian uranium is only used for peaceful purposes.

After more than 31 years of operations and the production of more than 110,000 tonnes of uranium oxide, open pit mining at Ranger mine ceased, with the closure of Pit 3 in November 2012.

== Expansion ==
In August 2011, ERA approved $120 million for construction of an exploration decline to conduct close spaced underground exploration drilling and to explore areas adjacent to the Ranger 3 Deeps resource. The Ranger 3 Deeps mineralised zone is estimated to contain over 34,761 tonnes of uranium oxide, and is recognised as a significant resource by world standards. ERA is undertaking a $57 million Prefeasibility Study into the potential development of a Ranger 3 Deeps underground mine. The Prefeasibility Study will determine the economic viability of the proposed Ranger 3 Deeps underground mine, optimise mining methods and confirm metallurgical performance and production rates. ERA is targeting late 2015 for commencement of production if the underground mine proves viable and all Board and regulatory approvals are obtained.

== Land ownership ==
Ranger mine is surrounded by, but separate from, Kakadu National Park, and the Mirarr clan of the Gaagadju Aboriginal people are the traditional owners of the land on which ERA operates.

From 1991 ERA held the lease to the nearby Jabiluka ore body 20 km (12 mi) further north, which was under a long-term care and maintenance agreement and would not be developed without the agreement of the Mirarr traditional owners. In 2024, the Northern Territory Government decided not to renew the lease for the high-grade uranium deposit.

== Environmental incidents ==
There have been a range of environmental incidents at the Ranger Uranium Mine with over 200 incidents documented, including major incidents in 1995, 2005, 2007, 2010 and 2013.

== See also ==
- Uranium mining controversy in Kakadu National Park
- Uranium in the environment
- Yvonne Margarula
- Jacqui Katona
