= Supervising Scientist =

The Supervising Scientist is a statutory office under Australian law, originally created to assist in the monitoring of what was then one of the world's largest uranium mines, the Ranger Uranium Mine. It now provides advice more generally on a 'wide range of scientific matters and mining-related environmental issues of national importance, including; radiological matters and tropical wetlands conservation and management'. The Supervising Scientist is administered as a division within the Department of the Environment, Water, Heritage and the Arts.

== See also ==
- Uranium mining in Australia
- Uranium mining in Kakadu National Park
