= List of inquiries into uranium mining in Australia =

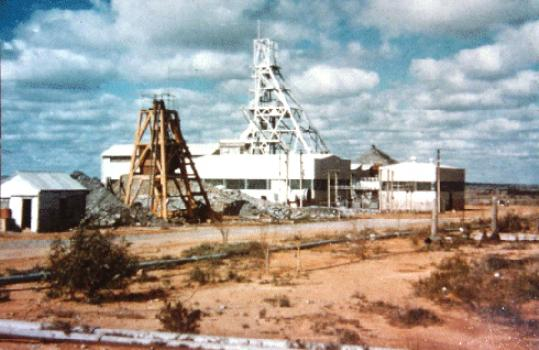
Radium Hill, a former minesite in South Australia which operated from 1906 until 1961. It was Australia's first uranium mine, years before the country's next major mines at Rum Jungle in the Northern Territory (opened in 1950), and the Mary Kathleen mine in Queensland (1958).

This is a List of Australian inquiries and reports relating to uranium mining issues.

== Background ==
For several decades uranium mining has been a major part of the Australian political landscape, with opposition groups citing the wide-ranging environmental impacts, indigenous land access and nuclear proliferation as reasons for ceasing or restricting the industry. The debate has resulted in limitations on mining and export activities, with Federal and State governments occasionally flip-flopping on public policy. In the meantime, mining companies have pursued exploration activities, and in some instances stockpiled mined ore.

== List ==
- 1976: Ranger Uranium Environmental Inquiry (Fox Report) (Vol 1) - Ranger Uranium Environmental Inquiry - Whether Australia should mine and export uranium
- 1977: Fox Report (Vol 2) - Ranger Uranium Environmental Inquiry - Proposed Development of Ranger
- 1984-1985: McClelland Royal Commission or Royal Commission into British nuclear tests in Australia.
- 1986: Ranger Uranium: Water Management System - House of Representatives inquiry
- 1988: The Potential of the Kakadu National Park Region - Senate Standing Committee on Environment, Recreation and the Arts
- 1991: Mining and Minerals Processing in Australia (4 Vols) – Industry Commission
- 1991: Kakadu Conservation Zone Inquiry Final Report – Resources Assessment Commission
- 1996: Report of the Senate Select Committee on Radioactive Waste. In response to this the Senate decided to reconstitute the committee as the Select Committee on Uranium Mining and Milling.
- 1996: Senate Select Committee established to report on Uranium Mining and Milling
- 1997: Senate Select Committee on Uranium Mining and Milling released report
- 1999: Australia's Kakadu – Government response to UNESCO World Heritage Committee regarding Kakadu National Park.
- 1999: Senate Inquiry into Jabiluka Uranium Mine Project referred to ECITA Committee
- 1999: Report of ECITA Committee into Jabiluka Uranium Mine Project released
- 2002: Senate Inquiry into Environmental Regulation of Uranium Mining
- 2006: Greenhouse friendly fuel for an energy hungry world - House of Representatives Standing Committee on Industry and Resources
- 2016: Nuclear Fuel Cycle Royal Commission

== See also ==
- Anti-nuclear movement in Australia
- Australian Uranium Association
- Uranium mining in Australia
