= Gummite =

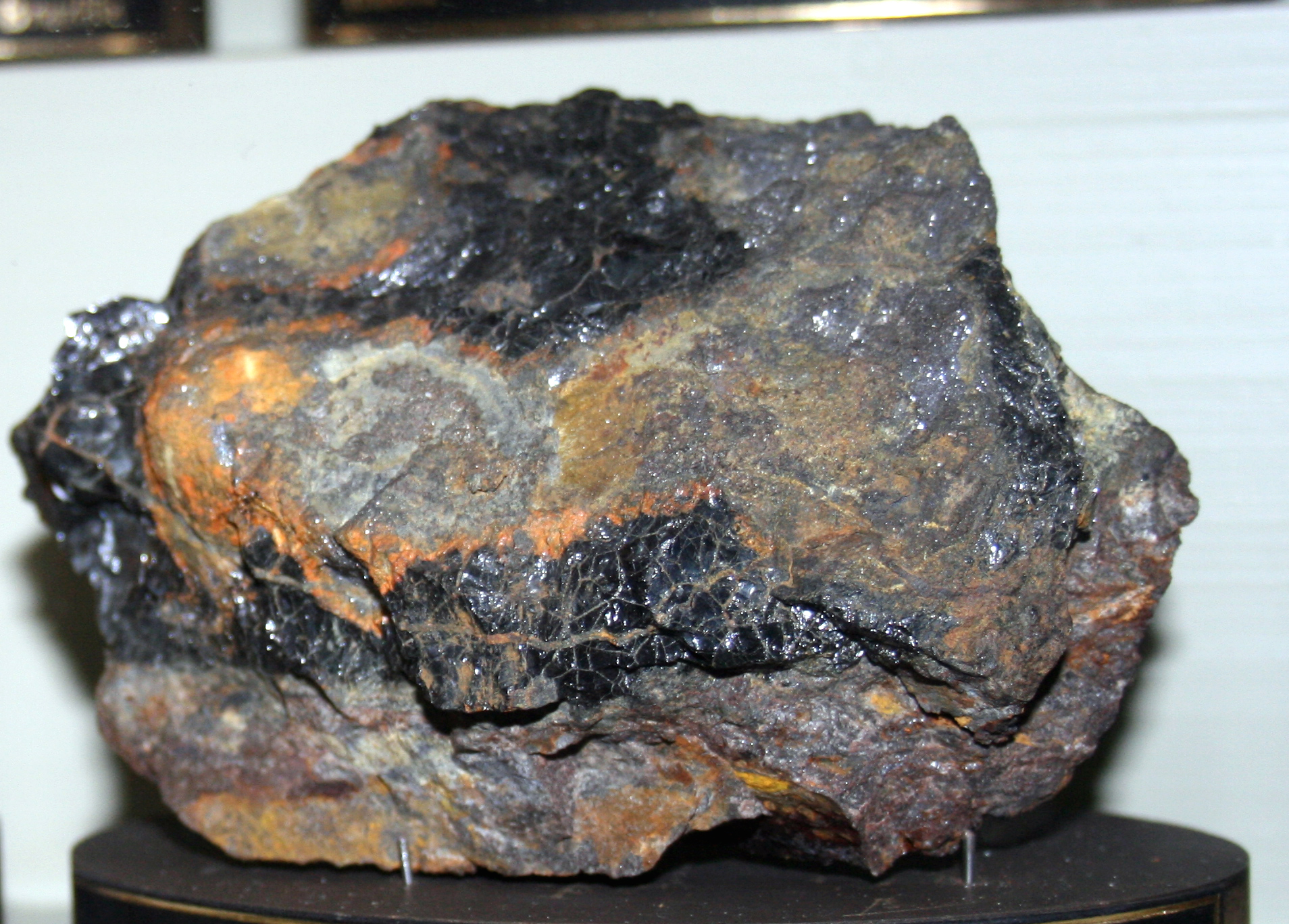
Gummite from collection of Prague National Museum

Gummite is a yellow amorphous mixture of uranium minerals, oxides, silicates, and hydrates of uranium, derived from the alteration of uraninite. It is named for its gum-like luster.

The material has been known by various other names, mostly due to differences in sample origins, including: eliasite from Elias – the name of a mine at Jáchymov, coracite – a variety from Lake Superior, pittinite, pechuran, urangummit, and uranogummite.
