= Brannerite =

Uranium ore mineral

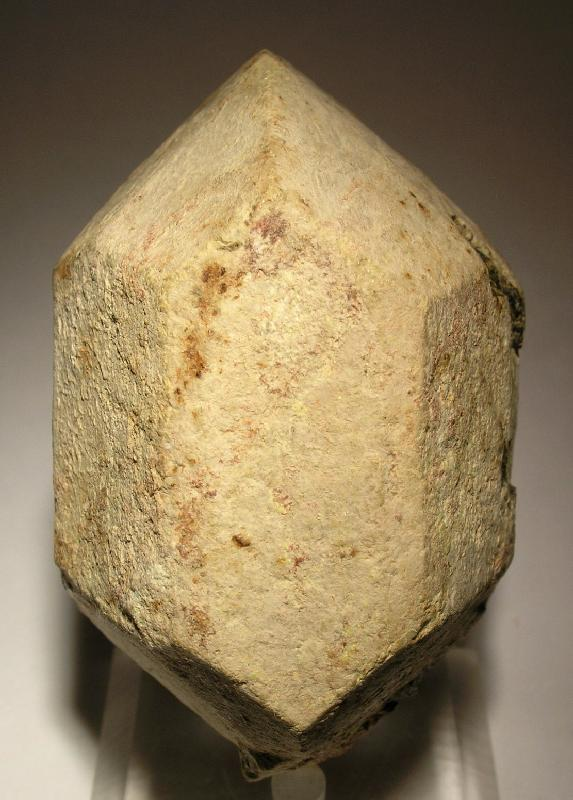

General
- Category: Oxide Minerals
- Formula: (U,Ca,Y,Ce)(Ti,Fe)2O6
- IMA symbol: Bnr
- Strunz classification: 4.DH.05
- Crystal system: Monoclinic

Identification
- Colour: Black, Brownish Olive Green, Yellow-Brown to Yellow
- Cleavage: None
- Luster: Vitreous, Resinous, Dull

Brannerite is a rare earth oxide mineral found in the form (U,Ca,Ce)(Ti,Fe)_{2}O_{6} Named for Dr. John Casper Branner.
