= Jabiluka =

Uranium mine in Northern Territory, Australia

Jabiluka Mine
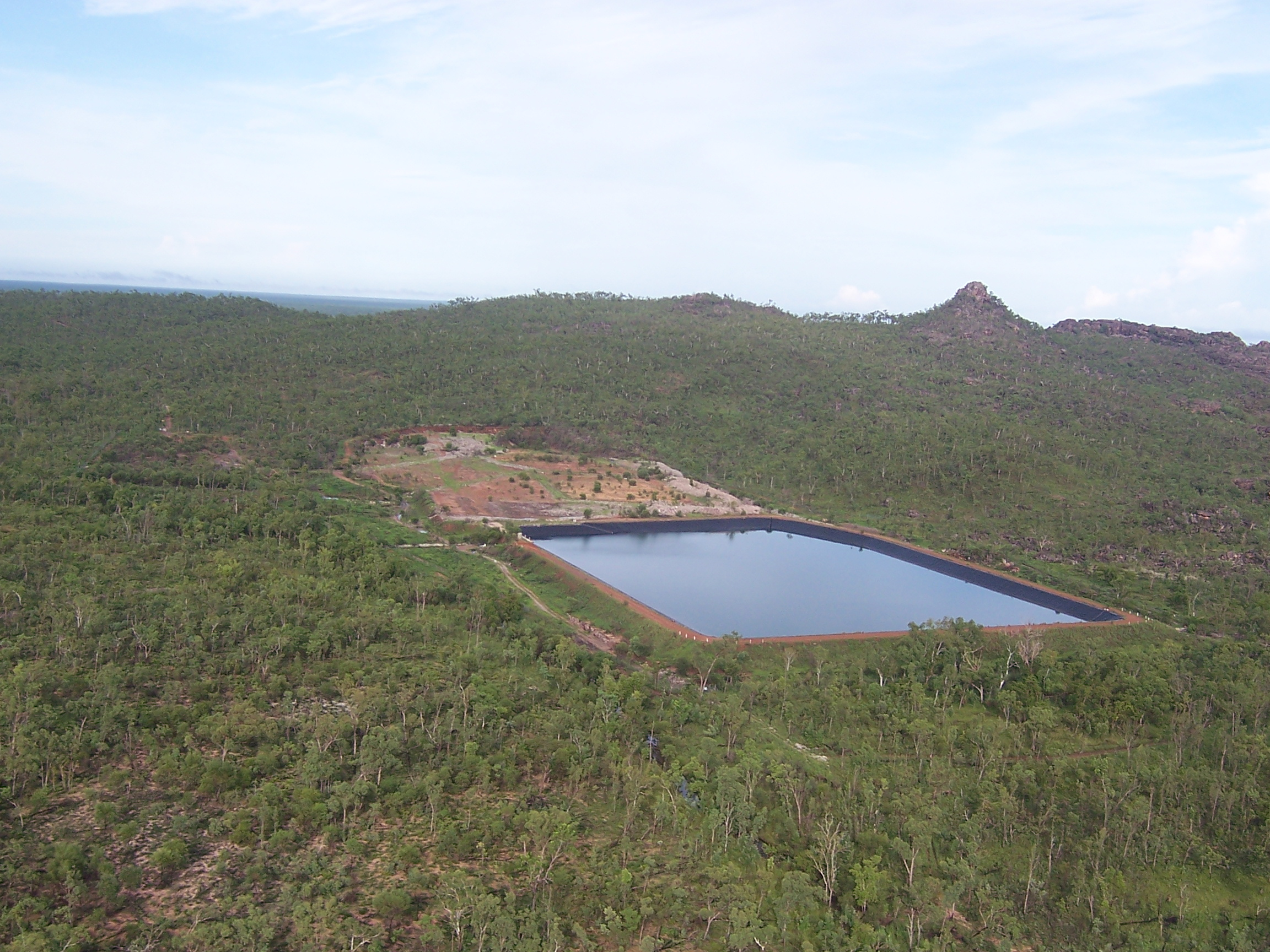
- Jabiluka development site.

- Location in Northern Territory
- Location: Kakadu, Northern Territory, Australia; 12°31′50″S 132°54′30″E
- Products: Uranium
- Discovered: 1971 (Jabiluka 1); 1973 (Jabiluka 2)
- Opened: never mined
- Company: Energy Resources of Australia Limited
- Website: http://www.energyres.com.au/

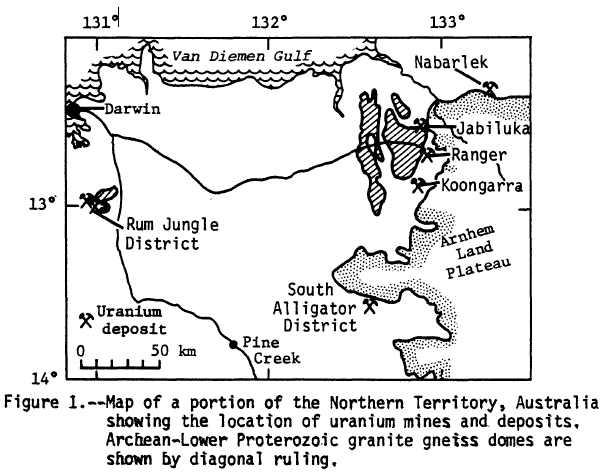
Location of key Northern Territory uranium mines

Jabiluka is a pair of uranium deposits and mine development in the Northern Territory of Australia that was to have been built on land belonging to the Mirarr clan of Aboriginal people. The mine site is surrounded by, but not part of, the World Heritage–listed Kakadu National Park.

== History ==
Exploration on the site began in the late 1960s with Jabiluka 1 being discovered in 1971 and the much larger Jabiluka 2 discovered in 1973. The Jabiluka deposits were included in the group of uranium deposits that were the subject of the Fox Inquiry. As a result of this inquiry, the Jabiluka mining lease and two others were created along with Kakadu National Park. Feasibility works into the development of the mine were well progressed at the time of the 1983 Australian federal election, which saw the Australian Labor Party take government. Under this government, an export licence for the uranium was unlikely to have been granted and the project development was stopped. Energy Resources of Australia Ltd bought the deposit from Pancontinental and proceeded without background work. Upon the election of the Howard Liberal government in 1996, the project was once again placed into development.

The Jabiluka Long-Term Care and Maintenance Agreement signed in February 2005 gives the traditional owners veto rights over future development of Jabiluka. However, in 2007, Rio Tinto suggested that the mine could reopen one day.

In 2024, the Northern Territory Government decided not to renew ERA's lease for the high-grade uranium deposit.

== Controversy ==
In 1998 the issue came to a head when Jacqui Katona and Yvonne Margarula, of the Mirarr people, called on activists to come from around Australia and the world to blockade the construction of the mine by Energy Resources of Australia (ERA). Over 500 people were arrested in the course of the eight-month blockade. Hundreds of thousands of people across Australia also took part in demonstrations against the mine while others set up action groups and took part in shareholder activism.

ERA developed the surface infrastructure and the decline down to the ore-body to allow for further definition of the resource. Falling uranium prices prevented the project from proceeding. ERA's parent company, North Ltd, was bought by Rio Tinto Group, who announced that the mine will not go ahead – at least until their nearby Ranger uranium mine is mined out.

The Mirarr people agitated for Rio Tinto to clean up the mine site and restore it in keeping with the surrounding National Park. On 12 August 2003 rehabilitation works commenced on the Jabiluka site, 50,000 tonnes of material from the mine were put back down the decline at Jabiluka, filling up 1.2 km of decline.

In 2013, work to remove and remediate the interim water management pond commenced.

According to ERA, between 2005 and 2015 over 16,000 stems of two dozen different species of native plants were planted at the Jabiluka site. Aerial photography shows significant recovery and regeneration.

=== Documentary films ===
The 1997 documentary film, Jabiluka, was produced and directed by David Bradbury. Another film on the subject was made by Cathy Henkel, called Walking Through a Minefield. It was released in 1999. In 2006, documentary filmmaker Pip Starr released Fight for Country: the story of the Jabiluka Blockade. Starr spent five years working on the film. In 1979 Bonita Ely, assisted by Charles Green and William Winford, performed "Jabiluka UO2", using the binaries spiral and straight line to express conflicting, opposing, cultures. Two men like surveyors draw a straight long white line across the landscape. Ely creates a fringed conical dome adorned with an ochre spiral, referring to the woven mats women in Arnhem Land make for their babies and to rest in. To continue the line the men will destroy the cone. Ely spins in front of them to communicate its importance but they ignore her, she collapses from vertigo, they smash the dome. After they pack up and leave Bonita Ely reasserts the spiral, burning the spiral into the earth with dry grass.

== See also ==
- Uranium in the environment
- Anti-nuclear movement in Australia
- Activist Wisdom
- List of uranium mines
- Unconformity uranium deposits
- Uranium mining
