= Uranium in the environment =

Uranium in the environment is a global health concern, and comes from both natural and man-made sources. Beyond naturally occurring uranium, mining, phosphates in agriculture, weapons manufacturing, and nuclear power are anthropogenic sources of uranium in the environment.

In the natural environment, radioactivity of uranium is generally low, but uranium is a toxic metal that can disrupt normal functioning of the kidney, brain, liver, heart, and numerous other systems. Chemical toxicity can cause public health issues when uranium is present in groundwater, especially if concentrations in food and water are increased by mining activity. The biological half-life (the average time it takes for the human body to eliminate half the amount in the body) for uranium is about 15 days.

Uranium's radioactivity can present health and environmental issues in the case of nuclear waste produced by nuclear power plants or weapons manufacturing.

Uranium is weakly radioactive and remains so because of its long physical half-life (4.468 billion years for uranium-238). The use of depleted uranium (DU) in munitions is controversial because of questions about potential long-term health effects.

== Natural occurrence ==
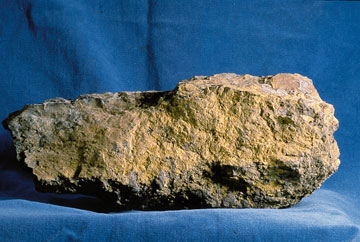
Uranium ore

Uranium is a naturally occurring element found at low levels within all rock, soil, and water. This is the highest-numbered element to be found naturally in significant quantities on Earth. According to the United Nations Scientific Committee on the Effects of Atomic Radiation the normal concentration of uranium in soil is 300 μg/kg to 11.7 mg/kg.

It is considered to be more plentiful than antimony, beryllium, cadmium, gold, mercury, silver, or tungsten and is about as abundant as tin, arsenic or molybdenum. It is found in many minerals including uraninite (the most common uranium ore), autunite, uranophane, torbernite, and coffinite. There are significant concentrations of uranium in some substances, such as phosphate rock deposits, and minerals such as lignite, and monazite sands in uranium-rich ores. (It is recovered commercially from these sources.) Coal fly ash from uranium-bearing coal is particularly rich in uranium, and there have been several proposals to "mine" this waste product for its uranium content. Because some of the ash produced in a coal power plant escapes through the smokestack, the radioactive contamination released by coal power plants in normal operation is actually higher than that of nuclear power plants.

Seawater contains about 3.3 parts per billion (3.3 μg/kg of uranium by weight or 3.3 micrograms per liter).

== Sources of uranium ==
=== Mining and milling ===
Mining is the largest source of uranium contamination in the environment. Uranium milling creates radioactive waste in the form of tailings, which contain uranium, radium, and polonium. Consequently, uranium mining results in "the unavoidable radioactive contamination of the environment by solid, liquid and gaseous wastes".

Seventy percent of global uranium resources are on or adjacent to traditional lands belonging to Indigenous people, and perceived environmental risks associated with uranium mining have resulted in environmental conflicts involving multiple actors, in which local campaigns have become national or international debates.

Some of these environmental conflicts have limited uranium exploration. Incidents at Ranger Uranium Mine in the Northern Territory of Australia and disputes over Indigenous land rights led to increased opposition to development of the nearby Jabiluka deposits and suspension of that project in the early 2000s. Similarly, environmental damage from Uranium mining on traditional Navajo lands in the southwestern United States resulted in restrictions on additional mining in Navajo lands in 2005.

==== Occupational hazards ====
The radiation hazards of uranium mining and milling were not appreciated in the early years, resulting in workers being exposed to high levels of radiation. Inhalation of radon gas caused sharp increases in lung cancers among underground uranium miners employed in the 1940s and 1950s.

=== Military activity ===
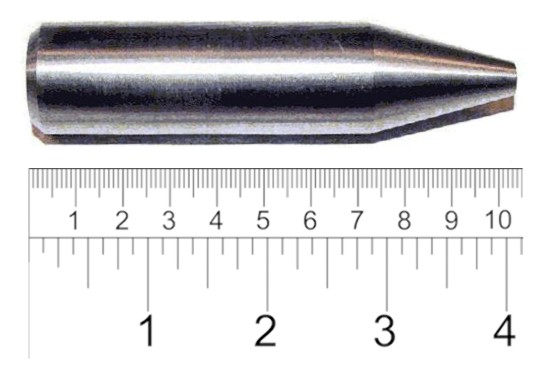
Depleted uranium penetrator from the PGU-14/B incendiary 30 mm round

Military activity is a source of uranium, especially at nuclear or munitions testing sites. Depleted uranium (DU) is a byproduct of uranium enrichment that is used for defensive armor plating and armor-piercing projectiles. Uranium contamination has been found at testing sites in the UK, in Kazakhstan, and in several countries as a result of depleted uranium munitions used in the Gulf War and the Yugoslav wars. During a three-week period of conflict in 2003 in Iraq, 1,000 to 2,000 tonnes of depleted uranium munitions were used.

Combustion and impact of depleted uranium munitions can produce aerosols that disperse uranium metal into the air and water where it can be inhaled or ingested by humans. A United Nations Environment Programme (UNEP) study has expressed concerns about groundwater contamination from these munitions. Studies of depleted uranium aerosol exposure suggest that uranium particles would quickly settle out of the air, and thus should not affect populations more than a few kilometres from target areas.

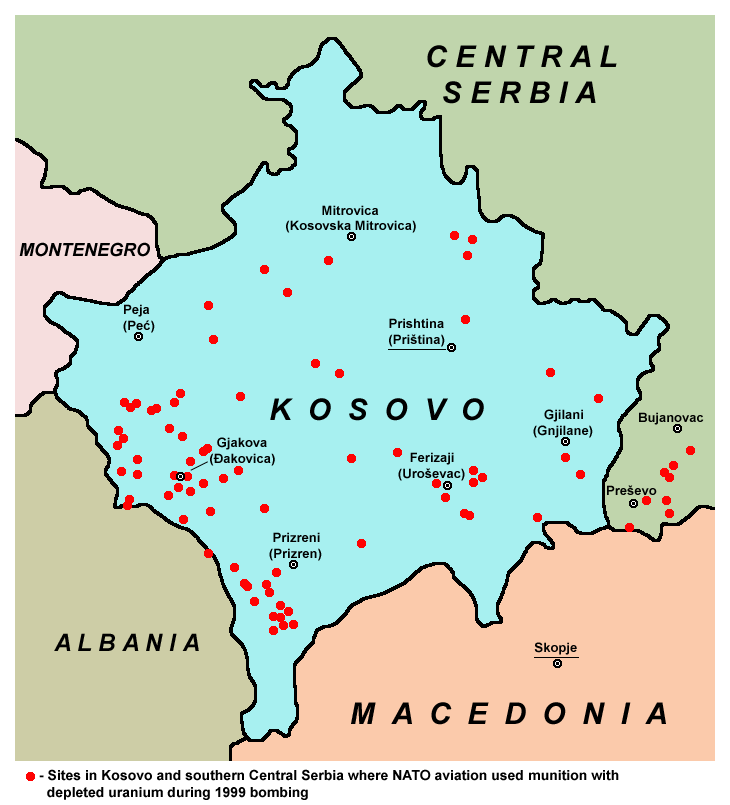
Sites in Kosovo and southern Central Serbia where NATO aviation used depleted uranium munitions during 1999 bombing

=== Nuclear energy and waste ===
The nuclear power industry is also a source of uranium in the environment in the form of radioactive waste or through nuclear accidents such as Three Mile Island or the Chernobyl disaster. Perceived risks of contamination associated with this industry contribute to the anti-nuclear movement.

In 2020, there were over 250,000 metric tons of high-level radioactive waste being stored globally in temporary containers. This waste is produced by nuclear power plants and weapons facilities, and is a serious human health and environmental issue. There are plans to permanently dispose of high-level waste in deep geological repositories, but none of these are operational. Corrosion of aging temporary containers has caused some waste to leak into the environment.

As spent uranium dioxide fuel is very insoluble in water, it is likely to release uranium (and fission products) even more slowly than borosilicate glass when in contact with water.

== Health effects ==
Tiron

Soluble uranium salts are toxic, though less so than those of other heavy metals such as lead or mercury. The organ which is most affected is the kidney. Soluble uranium salts are readily excreted in the urine, although some accumulation in the kidneys does occur in the case of chronic exposure. The World Health Organization has established a daily "tolerated intake" of soluble uranium salts for the general public of 0.5 μg/kg body weight (or 35 μg for a 70 kg adult): exposure at this level is not thought to lead to any significant kidney damage.

Tiron may be used to remove uranium from the human body, in a form of chelation therapy. Bicarbonate may also be used as uranium (VI) forms complexes with the carbonate ion.

=== Public health ===
Uranium mining produces toxic tailings that are radioactive and may contain other toxic elements such as radon. Dust and water leaving tailing sites may carry long-lived radioactive elements that enter water sources and the soil, increase background radiation, and eventually be ingested by humans and animals. A 2013 analysis in a medical journal found that, "The effects of all these sources of contamination on human health will be subtle and widespread, and therefore difficult to detect both clinically and epidemiologically." A 2019 analysis of the global uranium industry said that the industry was shifting mining activities toward the Global South where environmental regulations are typically less stringent; and that people in impacted communities would "surely experience adverse environmental consequences" and public health issues arising from mining activities carried out by powerful multi-national corporations or mining companies based in foreign countries.

=== Cancer ===
In 1950, the US Public Health service began a comprehensive study of uranium miners, leading to the first publication of a statistical correlation between cancer and uranium mining, released in 1962. The federal government eventually regulated the standard amount of radon in mines, setting the level at 0.3 WL on January 1, 1969.

Out of 69 present and former uranium milling sites in 12 states, 24 have been abandoned, and are the responsibility of the US Department of Energy. Accidental releases from uranium mills include the 1979 Church Rock uranium mill spill in New Mexico, called the largest accident of nuclear-related waste in US history, and the 1986 Sequoyah Corporation Fuels Release in Oklahoma.

In 1990, Congress passed the Radiation Exposure Compensation Act (RECA), granting reparations for those affected by mining, with amendments passed in 2000 to address criticisms with the original act.

=== Depleted uranium exposure studies ===
The use of depleted uranium (DU) in munitions is controversial because of questions about potential long-term health effects. Normal functioning of the kidney, brain, liver, heart, and numerous other systems can be affected by uranium exposure, because uranium is a toxic metal. Some people have raised concerns about the use of depleted uranium munitions because of its mutagenicity, teratogenicity in mice, neurotoxicity, and its suspected carcinogenic potential. Additional concerns address unexploded depleted uranium munitions leeching into groundwater over time.

The toxicity of depleted uranium is a point of medical controversy. Multiple studies using cultured cells and laboratory rodents suggest the possibility of leukemogenic, genetic, reproductive, and neurological effects from chronic exposure. A 2005 epidemiology review concluded: "In aggregate the human epidemiological evidence is consistent with increased risk of birth defects in offspring of persons exposed to DU." The World Health Organization states that no risk of reproductive, developmental, or carcinogenic effects have been reported in humans due to depleted uranium exposure. This report has been criticized by Dr. Keith Baverstock for not including possible long-term effects.

==== Birth defects ====
Most scientific studies have found no link between uranium and birth defects, but some claim statistical correlations between soldiers exposed to DU, and those who were not, concerning reproductive abnormalities.

One study found epidemiological evidence for increased risk of birth defects in the offspring of persons exposed to DU. Several sources have attributed an increased rate of birth defects in the children of Gulf War veterans and in Iraqis to inhalation of depleted uranium. A 2001 study of 15,000 Gulf War combat veterans and 15,000 control veterans found that the Gulf War veterans were 1.8 (fathers) to 2.8 (mothers) times more likely to have children with birth defects. A study of Gulf War Veterans from the UK found a 50% increased risk of malformed pregnancies reported by men over non-Gulf War veterans. The study did not find correlations between Gulf war deployment and other birth defects such as stillbirth, chromosomal malformations, or congenital syndromes. The father's service in the Gulf War was associated with increased rate of miscarriage, but the mother's service was not.

=== In animals ===
Uranium causes reproductive defects and other health problems in rodents, frogs and other animals. Uranium was also shown to have cytotoxic, genotoxic and carcinogenic effects in animals. It has been shown in rodents and frogs that water-soluble forms of uranium are teratogenic.

== In soil and microbiology ==
Bacteria and Pseudomonadota, such as Geobacter and Burkholderia fungorum (strain Rifle), can reduce and fix uranium in soil and groundwater. These bacteria change soluble Uranium(VI) into the highly insoluble complex-forming Uranium(IV) ion, hence stopping chemical leaching.

It has been suggested that it is possible to form a reactive barrier by adding something to the soil which will cause the uranium to become fixed. One method of doing this is to use a mineral (apatite) while a second method is to add a food substance such as acetate to the soil. This will enable bacteria to reduce the uranium(VI) to uranium(IV), which is much less soluble. In peat-like soils, the uranium will tend to bind to the humic acids; this tends to fix the uranium in the soil.
