= Ranger Uranium Mine =

Uranium mine in the Northern Territory of Australia

Ranger
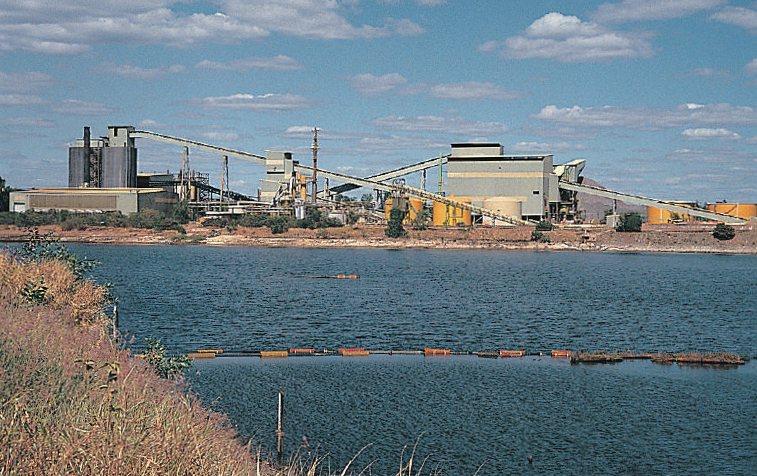
- Ranger mill complex

- Location in the Northern Territory
- Interactive map of Ranger
- Location: Kakadu National Park, Northern Territory, Australia; 12°41′S 132°55′E
- Products: Uranium oxide (U_{3}O_{8})
- Production: 132,000 tonnes U_{3}O_{8}
- Financial year: Mine lifetime
- Discovered: 1969
- Opened: 1980
- Closed: 2021
- Company: Energy Resources of Australia Limited
- Website: http://www.energyres.com.au/

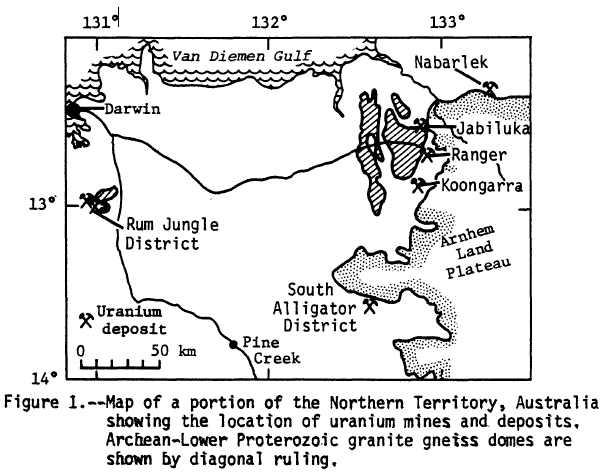
Location of key Northern Territory uranium mines

The Ranger Uranium Mine was a uranium mine in the Northern Territory of Australia. The site is surrounded by, but separate from Kakadu National Park, 230 km east of Darwin. The orebody was discovered in late 1969, and the mine commenced operation in 1980, reaching full production of uranium oxide in 1981 and ceased stockpile processing on 8 January 2021. Mining activities had ceased in 2012. It was owned and operated by Energy Resources of Australia (ERA), a public company 86.33% owned by Rio Tinto Group, the remainder held by the public. Uranium mined at Ranger was sold for use in nuclear power stations in Japan, South Korea, China, UK, France, Germany, Spain, Sweden and the United States.

The original Ranger 1 orebody was mined out by the end of 1995, although some ore remained stockpiled. A second orebody, Ranger 3, began mining in 1997. Both were open-pit mines. Mining finished at Ranger in late 2012, efforts to exploit Ranger 3 Deeps failed, and the mine plant processed some stockpiled ore until January 2021. ERA had tenure and access to the site, principally for rehabilitation activities, until 8 January 2026.

== Discovery ==
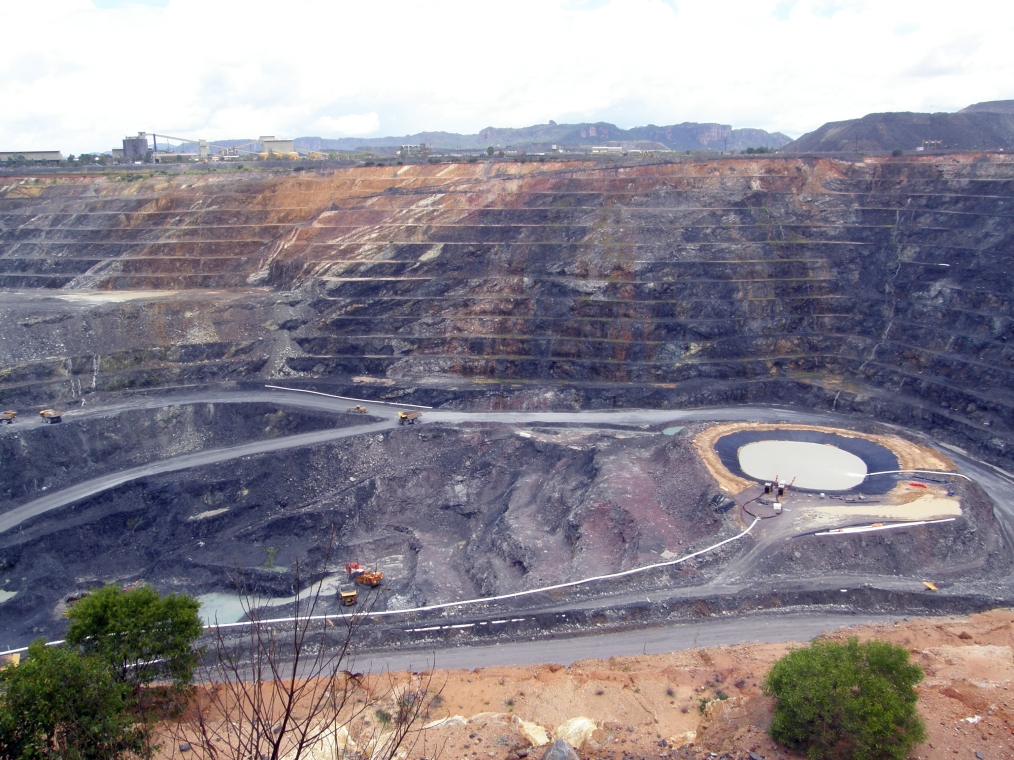
Ranger Pit 3, Northern Territory, Australia: Uranium mineralised Cahill Formation as visible in the pit is unconformably overlain by Kombolgie Sandstone forming the mountains in the background

The Ranger uranium orebody, the richest in the southern hemisphere, was discovered in late 1969, when an aerial radiometric survey conducted by Geophysical Resources Development Co., a company based in Sydney, on contract to Noranda Aluminum, detected a large spike in gamma radiation when passing over Mount Brockman, known as Djidbidjidbi to the Mirarr traditional owners of the area. The instrument that detected the anomaly was a Nuclear Enterprises gamma ray spectrometer using a Thallium doped Sodium Iodide cylindrical crystal. At time of discovery the aircraft was flying at an altitude of 100 metres (330 ft). The anomaly could still be detected at almost 915 metres (3,000 ft). The crew members on board were Bill Hay, the pilot, Harvey Morton, the navigator and Frank Lanza, the instruments operator, who first recognised the significance of the anomaly.

== Ranger Uranium Environmental Inquiry ==
In 1975, Gough Whitlam appointed Justice Russell Fox, a judge of the Supreme Court of the Australian Capital Territory, to lead an inquiry into the environmental dangers posed by mining uranium in the Northern Territory and the associated risks of exporting it, including those of nuclear proliferation. The inquiry produced two reports, published in 1976 and 1977.

== Ore bodies ==
The Ranger No. 1 and Ranger No. 3 ore bodies occur in the Cahill Formation, consisting of Lower Proterozoic metasediments, located in the Alligator Rivers Uranium Field. The mine commenced operation in 1980, reaching full production of uranium oxide in 1981. Owing to the environmental sensitivity of the site, a special statutory authority, the Supervising Scientist, was created to provide oversight of the operation and conduct environmental research in the region.

Ranger mine covers two of a line of uranium orebodies that extend from near Nourlangie Rock in Kakadu north-eastwards to Koongarra, underneath Mount Brockman, then northwards through the Ranger One line of orebodies (in order Number 2, Number 1, and Number 3), then via Hades Flat, where there is uranium mineralisation, to Jabiluka where the line turns westward through the Barote and Ranger 4 orebodies. The mine covers No 1 Orebody and No 3 Orebody. No 2 Orebody was excluded from the mining lease at the request of the traditional owners and included in Kakadu National Park. From Ranger 4 the line again turns northwards and then swings westward round an Archaean basement dome before turning south towards Nourlangie Rock again. Uranium mineralisation is known at several other places along this line but has never been explored in detail because of the creation of Kakadu. The name 'Ranger' for the series of discoveries made by Geopeko, the exploration arm of Peko-Wallsend, in the period 1969 to 1972, was thought up by Judy Ryan, the wife of the geologist in charge of the program. Koongarra and Jabiluka were retained by the companies that found them: Noranda Australia and Pancontinental Mining respectively, although since sold to other parties. The other discoveries were enclosed in the National Park.

ERA was named Explorer of the Year at the sixth annual Australian Mining Prospect Awards held in Sydney in November 2009. During 2008, ERA's exploration programme identified a significant mineral resource adjacent to the operating Ranger 3 pit. The area, known as Ranger 3 Deeps, ranked among the world's most significant new uranium discoveries of recent years.

== Ranger 3 Deeps ==
As production from the existing mines declined in the early 2010s, ERA constructed a $120 million Ranger 3 Deeps exploration decline (tunnel) to conduct close spaced underground exploration drilling and explore areas adjacent to the Ranger 3 Deeps resource. This was never developed as of 2024. The Ranger 3 Deeps mineralised zone contains an estimated resource of 32,620 tonnes (72,000,000 lb) of uranium oxide, comprising measured, indicated and inferred categories totalling 11.9 million tonnes of ore grading 0.274% U_{3}O_{8}.

New permissions would have been needed to mine this resource. In parallel with the construction of the exploration decline, ERA began a $57 million project to prepare a Prefeasibility Study into the potential development of a Ranger 3 Deeps underground mine. This Study determined the economic viability of the project, optimal mining methods, and metallurgical performance and production rates. Environmental studies were also conducted and published. ERA consulted further with the Gundjeihmi Aboriginal Corporation as a component of a broader social impact assessment.

ERA formally commenced the statutory approval process for the proposed Ranger 3 Deeps underground mine in January 2013 with the submission of a referral to the Commonwealth Department of Sustainability, Environment, Water Population and Communities under the Environmental Protection and Biodiversity Control Act 1999. At the same time, ERA separately lodged a notice of intent with the Northern Territory Environment Protection Authority under the Northern Territory Environmental Assessment Act. However, as reported by World Nuclear News in 2021, "Traditional owners of the land covered by the Ranger uranium project informed ERA in 2015 that they did not support any extension of the authority to mine in the project area. ERA decided not to proceed with a final feasibility study at Ranger 3 Deeps, which is an extension of the Ranger orebody. ERA today said it now expects to begin work to close the 2.2 km, 400-500 m deep Ranger 3 Deeps decline, excavated as part of those studies, during the first-half of this year."

== Ore processing ==
Ore was crushed, ground, then leached with sulphuric acid. Uranium was removed using kerosene with amine then stripped with ammonium sulphate solution and gaseous ammonia. Ammonium diuranate was precipitated by increasing the pregnant solution pH, and converted to uranium oxide (U_{3}O_{8}) in a furnace.

In early 2006, ERA announced an expansion to the processing plant which allowed production to extend into lower-grade ore and in November 2006 the company announced plans to invest in a laterite processing plant, which would allow it to process ore with a high clay content that has been stockpiled since the mine began operating. This ore had been already included in stated reserves. The laterite processing plant contributed 400 tonnes of uranium oxide per year from 2008 until closure.

== Water management ==
Water management is a critical component of ERA's business, and between 2009 and 2012, it completed water management projects for a total cost of $82 million. This included surface water interception trenches around stockpiles to protect local waterways, installation of continuous real-time monitoring stations, and additional ground water bores to augment the extensive ground water monitoring programme.

In addition, ERA completed a 2.3-metre life of the Tailings Storage Facility, constructed a new pond water retention pond to store up to one gigalitre of pond water, and installed contingency water pumping system between the Tailings Storage Facility and Pit 3. From 2012 to 2014, ERA expected to expend a total of $316 million in various water management projects including the $220 million Brine Concentrator Project. Brine Concentrators use thermal energy to evaporate water, which is subsequently condensed and discharged as clean distilled water.

The Brine Concentrator had the capacity to produce 1.83 gigalitres of clean water per year through the treatment of process water. Hatch was appointed EPCM contractor for the Brine Concentrator project. It was successfully commissioned in November 2013 with a budget of AUD $220 Million dollars.

In 2012, ERA and the Mirarr traditional owners represented by the Gundjeihmi Aboriginal Corporation (GAC), conducted a jointly facilitated independent expert review of the quality of surface water around the Ranger Project Area. The Independent Surface Water Working Group consisted of representatives from ERA, GAC, the Supervising Scientists Division and the Northern Land Council. Over a six-month period, the working group examined the impacts, monitoring and reporting of surface water flowing from the Ranger mine.

The working group agreed in findings released in March 2013 that the surface water management and regulatory systems in place at the Ranger mine were of a very high standard. Going forward, the Group agreed an action plan to ensure that surface water management systems at Ranger remained "best leading practice".

== Safety breaches and controversy ==
Environment Australia (an agency of the Government of Australia) have documented over 200 environmental incidents since 1979. The great majority of these were minor, but the significant ones are detailed below. In 2013, a spokesperson from the Public Health Association of Australia claimed that there had been a hundred safety incidents linked to the mine in the thirty years prior.

In May 2005 the company was convicted for breaching environmental guidelines - the first such prosecution of a mining company in the Northern Territory, relating to accidental radiological exposure to ERA employees. Radioactively contaminated process water had entered the drinking water supply and some workers drank and washed in it. Dozens of mine employees were found to have showered in and consumed water containing 400 times the legal limit of uranium. The maximum radiation exposure of workers was likely to have been much less than the regulatory limit, and no harmful long-term health effects are likely.

Other incidents involving decontamination of vehicles have been identified. When the work-for-welfare mechanic in Jabiru opened the engine bay, he was unaware of the nature of the mud and dirt which fell on the floor. The court heard that in the following weeks, after he had swept the material outside his shed, his children played and built sandcastles in mud contaminated with uranium.

Another significant controversy over Ranger's environmental impact is the public legal confrontation over releases into Magela Creek in the 1995 wet season. More recently, the ARRAC report from 2002 details a major leak of about 2 megalitres of potentially polluted water, over a number of months.

In 2007, water breached a retention pond, overflowing back into the pit. The original authorisation required that this water be contained at all times. In 2006, water management systems were disrupted by Cyclone Monica.

In May 2010, it was reported that a tailings dam may have released millions of litres of radioactive water into world heritage-listed wetlands in Kakadu National Park, home to about 500 Aboriginal people.

In November 2013, four drums previously used to transport yellowcake were found in a rural area of Darwin. The company recovered the drums amid concerns about the potential spread of radioactive contamination.

On 7 December 2013 there was an incident at a mine site inside Kakadu National Park, with about a million litres of slurry, comprising crushed ore and acid, believed spilled, workers evacuated and production shut down. A leaching tank containing the slurry burst at about 1am. The spilled material was entirely contained within the safety bunds and no material leaked into the wider ecosystem.

== Environmental justice issues ==
Ranger Uranium Mine is situated on the traditional lands of the Mirarr people of northern Australia and has been the subject of environmental and Aboriginal rights concerns. Although the Mirarr people, led by senior traditional owner Toby Gangale, opposed establishment of uranium mining, it began in the 1970s. In 1976, despite this opposition, the Australian federal government authorized the mine's development, leading to concerns over the violation of Aboriginal land rights. Since then, environmental groups and Mirarr representatives have continued to oppose the mine, with the senior traditional owner Yvonne Margarula continuing to voice concerns about its lasting impacts. In addition to the environmental degradation caused by the mine, the Mirarr have also raised concerns about uranium from the site potentially contributing to nuclear accidents.

With mining operations ceasing in 2021, subsequent rehabilitation efforts have been closely monitored, particularly regarding corporate responsibility and Aboriginal land rights. Energy Resources of Australia (ERA), majority-owned by Rio Tinto Group, is legally required to rehabilitate the site to a condition suitable for inclusion in the World Heritage-listed Kakadu National Park. Concerns have been raised about whether the ERA has sufficient resources to fulfil its legal obligations, with some questioning whether the financial and logistical burden of cleanup will ultimately fall on the Mirarr people.

== See also ==
- List of uranium mines
- Uranium ore deposits § Unconformity-related deposits
- Uranium market
- Uranium mining in Australia
