= Val McGinness =

Australian Aboriginal activist (1910–1988)

Valentine Bynoe McGinness usually known as Val McGinness (14 February 1910 – 1 November 1988) was an Aboriginal rights activist in Australia. He was a Larrakia and Kungarakany man.

== Life in the Northern Territory ==
McGinness was the son of Stephen Joseph McGinness, a miner and prospector, and his wife Alyandabu, who was also known as Lucy McGinness. His mother was a Kungarakany woman and, as such, he was officially designated a 'half-caste' when he was born, the fourth of five children.

McGuinness spent the first eight years of his life at his family's mine, called Lucy Mine (after his mother), nearby to Batchelor, until the death of his father in 1918. The Kungarakany name for the area of the mine is Mugudiber. Following his father's death he and his brother, Joe McGinness, became wards of the 'chief protector of Aborigines', because their mother was an Aboriginal woman, and were taken to the Kahlin Compound in Darwin. Wanting to be close to her children Alyandabu went with them and got a job there working as a cook, however, she was able to have only limited contact with them. McGinness remembered his time there unfavourably and recalled grim living conditions, substandard food and a poor standard of education stating that he never had any tuition. He remembered the following of his teacher:

"[T]his teacher sort of sat up at one end facing the two classes and she just sat -there, doing something, knitting or whatever she was doing. And, I forget now, but I think we did learn c-a-t, r-a-t, something like that and that was all. We just sat down and scribbled on our slates. I never actually had any tuition." Val McGinness, as quoted in 'I can picture the old home so clearly: the Commonwealth and 'half-caste' youth in the Northern Territory, ' (1993) by Tony Austin

McGinness and Joe escaped from the home in 1923, when he was 13, and the authorities chose not to interfere and McGinness and his brother stayed with their sister Margaret and her husband Harry Edwards who lived in Darwin. He became an apprentice to Harry and qualified as a blacksmith and wheelwright in 1927. During this period he also played for the Darwin Buffaloes Football Club and competed as a boxer.

On 20 December 1930 McGinness married Isabella Hume, who was from Borroloola, but the marriage was a short one and they later divorced.

Throughout the 1930s McGinness worked in various roles, including as a truck driver, on the railways, highway construction and chasing brumbies; he also spent time working on a peanut farming scheme near Katherine during the Great Depression. In the later part of the 1930s he spent some time working at the Darwin Hospital, in various roles, where he developed a friendship with the then pharmacist Xavier Herbert who, it is said, used McGinness as the inspiration of the character of Norman Shillingsworth in his novel Capricornia (1938). This claim is, however, contested with others believing that the character is based on Reuben Cooper, the son of Robert Joel Cooper.

McGinness and Herbert began working together regularly and McGinness assisted Herbert when he was the relieving superintendent of the Kahlin Compound for 8 moths in 1935 - 1936 and they worked together to try to improve conditions there. They also undertook mining ventures together and McGinness took Herbert to visit the Lucy Mine and they travelled there together by bicycle. In 1936 the pair formed the Euraustralian League (later known as the Northern Territory Half-caste Association) together which sought full citizenship for 'half-caste' people and people of mixed decent; this venture was short-lived and ended in 1938 and Herbert blamed this on the police, and other authorities, seeing it as being 'socially subversive'.

During this period McGinness knew Cecil Cook, who was then working as the Chief Protector of Aborigines, well and said of him: "I couldn’t say anything very good about him. He hated Aboriginals for a start".

In 1938, following the ending of the League, McGinness moved the Cairns where he worked primarily as a mechanic although he also took work on the goldfields, on pearling boats and for the Queensland Irrigation and Water Supply Commission.

In 1960 he returned to Darwin area and reclaimed the Lucy Mine site, in Darwin he was very involved in the local music scene as a mandolin player, and on 27 March 1967 he married Jaina Thompson.

In the 1970s McGinness was involved in, and acted as an informant, for the Finniss River Land Claim which was granted to The Kungarakan, Warai and Maranunggu peoples in 1981; this claim excluded the heavily polluted Rum Jungle uranium mine.

In 2017 McGinness, alongside his brothers Jack and Joe, and other members of his community working with Batchelor Institute of Indigenous Tertiary Education to revitalise the Kungarakany language. This project was led by his niece Wetjey Koormundum (Ida Bishop) and together they collected a number of language recordings.

He died 1 November 1988 in Atherton, Queensland.

== Legacy ==
He is the grandfather/great-uncle of Darwin based Larrakia woman and musician Ali Mills who performs some songs written by McGinness.

== Resources about ==
McGinness recorded four oral history interviews with Library & Archives NT in 1979, 1982, 1983 and 1987.

An oral history, recorded by the National Library of Australia in 1982, is also available online via Trove.
