= Vai Stanton =

Aboriginal Australian human rights activist (1929–1995)

- Born: Violet Frances McGinness; 1929; Mataranka, Northern Territory, Australia
- Died: 1995 (aged 65–66); Southport, Northern Territory, Australia
- Resting place: Lok Landji, Northern Territory, Australia
- Occupation: Aboriginal rights activist
- Era: 1964–1995
- Organisation: Foundation of Rehabilitation with Aboriginal Alcohol Related Difficulties
- Spouse: Jim Stanton (married 1947–1978, his death)
- Children: 3

Violet Frances "Vai" McGinness Stanton Mimbinggal (1929–1995) was an Australian Aboriginal human rights activist. She was known for her advocacy for Aboriginal communities living in the Northern Territory of Australia.

== Personal life ==
Stanton was born in 1929 in Mataranka, Northern Territory, into a Kungarakany and Gurindji family. She was the second of nine children born to Jack McGinness, the leader of the North Australian Workers' Union, and his wife, Violet Wakelin, who had been forcibly removed from her family as a child and sent to the Kahlin Compound before being put into service for a white family when she was 16.

Stanton was educated in Darwin and Katherine. During the bombing of Darwin in 1942, she and her family were evacuated to South Australia. Stanton later returned to the Northern Territory, where she worked as a wardsmaid in Katherine Hospital and completed a correspondence certificate course in English.

Stanton married Jim Stanton in 1947 until his death in 1978; they had three children together. Despite being married, Stanton was still considered to be a ward of the Northern Territory Government, and during the 1950s was required to carry a pass to prevent her children from being removed by the Aboriginal Affairs Branch.

During the 1960s, the Stantons built a home on land purchased near Southport, named Lok Landji. Stanton was buried there following her death in 1995.

== Activism ==
During the 1960s and 1970s, Stanton emerged as an activist advocating for better living conditions for Aboriginal communities in the Northern Territory. In 1964, she began working as a welfare office at the Bagot Community, a government reserve in Darwin. Stanton noted the poor living conditions in Bagot, as well as the violation of residents' rights to privacy due to government officials opening their mail and accessing their finances. Stanton characterised her role in Bagot as empowering the community to insist on improvements to their living standards, in addition to supporting them to navigate "oppression" that existed within state systems and organisations against Aboriginal people. This included a successful campaign that enabled Bagot residents to cash their own cheques without being reliant upon the reserve's superintendent to sign them.

In 1969, Stanton was awarded a year-long scholarship to the South Pacific Commission's community education training centre in Fiji. Upon her return to Australia the following year, she became an active member of the women's group Djuani, as well as the Aboriginal Development Foundation, supporting Aboriginal communities to access housing, arts and crafts, and occupational training.

In 1967, Stanton, alongside her sister Kathy Mills, Betty Pearce, Veronica Elsegood and Barbara Cummings, established the Foundation of Rehabilitation with Aboriginal Alcohol Related Difficulties (FORWAARD) to address concerns around alcohol misuse in Aboriginal communities. Initially volunteer-led and based out of a caravan, in 1975 FORWAARD established a 16-bed residential property in Stuart Park, Darwin, offering recovery and training to the local community. FORWAARD was formally incorporated in 1978 with Stanton as its coordinator.

In 1972, Stanton was invited to be part of the Advisory Council on Social Security and Welfare by Bill Hayden, the Minister for Social Security, representing the Aboriginal and Torres Strait Islanders communities. In her role, Stanton drew attention to issues Aboriginal people experienced accessing social security that she felt the government was not paying attention; for example, being unable to access the old age pension due to many older Aboriginal people at that time not having birth certificates to prove their ages. Stanton helped rewrite the Department of Social Security's servicing manual to ensure the department's processes took into accounts the needs of Aboriginal communities. In 1973, Stanton was a founding member of the Aboriginal Arts Board of the Australia Council.

In 1981, Stanton was one of the participants of a Marranunggu/Kungarakany land rights claim as a witness for the Kungarakany people. She compiled information and transcripts to consolidate tradition knowledge of the country among the Kungarakany, and provides classes and training on Kungakarakany language, spirituality, customs and beliefs.
