= McGinness =

McGinness is a surname. Notable people with the surname include:

- Jack McGinness, Australia's first elected Aboriginal union leader, son of Lucy McGinness and father of Kathy Mills
- Joe McGinness (1914–2003), Australian Aboriginal activist, son of Lucy McGinness
- John McGinness (born 1943), American physicist
- Lucy McGinness (c.1874?–1961), aka Alngindabu, Aboriginal Australian elder
- Mike McGinness (1947–2025), American politician in Nevada
- Paul McGinness (1896–1955), Australian World War I flying ace
- Ryan McGinness (born 1972), American artist
- Val McGinness (1910–1988) son of Lucy McGinness

== See also ==
- McGinness Airport, a defunct airport in Lancaster County, Pennsylvania, United States
