= Daisy Ruddick =

Aboriginal Australian (1915–2002)

Daisy Florence Ruddick née Cusack (15 August 1915 – 23 April 2002) was a Gurindji woman and member of the Stolen Generations from the Northern Territory of Australia. Her skin name is Kumachi.

== Life in the Northern Territory ==
Ruddick was born on Limbunya Station and was the daughter of a Demae, a Gurindji woman, and Jack Cusack, an Irishman who was employed at the station. At the age of six she was taken from her mother and taken to the Kahlin Compound, in Darwin, while her mother was away in hospital. In order to travel to Darwin she, alongside two other girls taken at the same time, were taken on horseback to Timber Creek, which took several weeks, and then travelled by boat.

Ruddick later stated that her father tried to have her returned to him but died before he was able to do so. Ruddick's brother Peter Limbunya was allowed to stay at the station because he had an Aboriginal father.

Ruddick remained at the compound until she was thirteen and spoke out about her time there and, like Val McGinness, stated that the education and food she received was minimal. She also recalled frequent beatings saying that:

Flogging was every day. We'd get flogged by the matron. And we'd get flogged by the girls in charge of the dormitory

— Daisy Ruddick, as quoted in 'I can picture the old home so clearly : the Commonwealth and 'half-caste' youth in the Northern Territory 1911-1939' (1993) by Tony Austin

This was despite corporal punishment of girls being banned in South Australia but allowed in the Northern Territory. Ruddick also recalled being forced to stand in the hot sun, the shaving of hair, the deprivation of food, the whitewashing of faces and the tying of children to the bed all being used as punishments. She said the older girls often bullied the younger ones.

After she left Ruddick went to work as a nanny for the family of Eric Asche, where she cared for their son Austin Asche, in Darwin. She remember this experience positively and felt as though she was treated as one of their own and Asche, who would later speak at her funeral, considered her to be his big sister.

After Ruddick left the Asche family she began studying as a nurse assistant, through which became the first Aboriginal Health Worker in the Northern Territory and, in 1934 she was sent by Cecil Cook to assist Clyde Fenton in the establishment of Katherine Hospital and she worked with him for a number of years until recalled by Cook. Cook then had her return to the Kahlin Compound and work at the Bagot Hospital and, at 23 years-old, she did not wish to return.

Later, at the age of 25, when encouraged by Cook, she purchased a home in the area; something that then Aboriginal women could not do easily and this home was one of the first 5 Aboriginal Trust homes. In 1939 she married Joseph Ruddick, despite Cook's disapproval of her choice (although he did ultimately give approval), and went on to have four children with him.

During World War II Ruddick was evacuated and spent time in Mildura and Melbourne where she began a lasting friendship with Sir Ernest Edward "Weary" Dunlop. During this period her husband served with the RAAF.

Ruddick became a qualified nurse and, while working in Darwin, became known as the 'Pied Piper' for the way she gathered people who had fallen on hard times and, as a part of this, her home became a refuge for many.

She was an active member of the Australian Half-Castes Progressive Association, alongside Joe McGinness, and worked hard to improve conditions for her people. She was also a founding member of Darwin's Sunshine Club, an all-nationalities social club. In 1952 she separated from her husband.

When Ruddick died in 2002 her funeral was held in the former Vestey's Meatworks as there was not a church large enough to accommodate the at least 2,000 people in attendance.

== Oral history ==
Ruddick recorded numerous oral history interviews including at least two recorded Tony Austin by Library & Archives NT in the 1990s and another, recorded in 2001, which is held by AIATSIS (B H388.63/U1).

== Legacy ==
Ruddick Circuit in Stuart Park, Darwin is named for her.
