= Mining in the Northern Territory =

- Position of Northern Territory within Australia

Location
- State: Northern Territory
- Country: Australia

Regulatory authority
- Authority: Department of Mines & Energy
- Website: Official website

Production
- Value: ▼ A$3,436 million
- Employees: ▼5,732
- Year: 2015

Mining in the Northern Territory accounts for 16.4% of the gross domestic product, inclusive of both the minerals and petroleum industries. In 2015, it was valued at A$3,436 million. It accounts for 4.3% of the Northern Territory workforce. 63 businesses are currently engaged in the sector.

== History ==
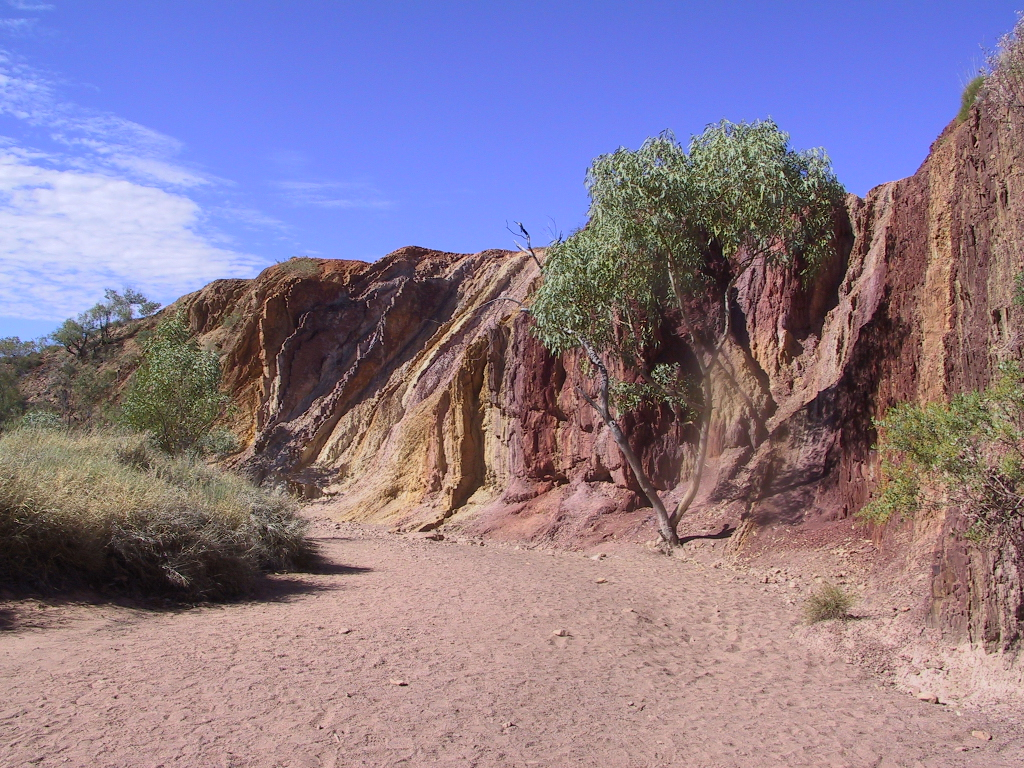
The Ochre Pits

Prior to European Settlement Indigenous groups mined ochre and other materials for ceremonial activities. With the arrival of the Overland Telegraph Line in the 1860s-70's gold was discovered in small quantities at a number of locations when the Northern Territory was being administered by South Australia.

The first large find of gold in the region was made at Pine Creek, about 250kms south of Darwin in 1872. Its discovery led to an influx of prospectors to the region, including a large number of Chinese migrants. Soon Chinese migrants outnumbered 'white' miners, those of European backgrounds, and tensions arose with many white miners being angered that Chinese workers were 'undercutting the existing labour force. This tension ultimately led to the creation of South Australia's Chinese Restriction Act 1888 which brought in tonnage restrictions and a poll tax on each Chinese arrival and dramatically reduced the number of arrivals to the region.

The next major gold discovery was made at Arltunga, 110kms east of Alice Springs, in 1897 where a battery and cyanide plant were established to process the ore.

Other mineral discoveries, besides gold, were also made during this period including copper at Pine Creek in 1872 and the Daly River region in 1882. Mica was discovered at Hart Range from 1892 and wolfram at Hatches Creek (between Alice Springs and Tennant Creek).

Despite these discoveries there were few early mining successes during this early era, in large part, because conditions on the goldfields and mines were harsh and often the mines were located long distances from the larger settlements, harsh weather conditions, high prices for goods and services and fluctuating metal prices.

== Major commodities ==
=== Manganese ===
Manganese mining in the Northern Territory in the financial year 2013-14, was worth A$1,024 million.

=== Petroleum ===
Petroleum, like mining, falls under the jurisdiction of the Department of Mines and Energy. It was worth $214 million in 2014. The NT onshore area is over 1.35 million km^{2}. There were 54 active exploration permits, three retention and five productions licences. Hydrocarbons have been produced since the 1980s.

Onshore gas was produced at the Mereenie and Palm Valley gas fields in the Amadeus Basin, west of Alice Springs. The Dingo Field began producing gas in November 2015.

=== Gold ===
Gold mining in the Northern Territory was worth A$770 million in 2014.

=== Uranium ===
Uranium mining in the Northern Territory in the financial year 2013-14, was worth A$136 million.

=== Geothermal ===
There are no granted geothermal permits in the NT at the time of producing this report. The last permit was surrendered in 2014.

== Table of Mines in the Northern Territory ==
Mines in Northern Territory
Name	Alternate Names	Coordinates	Status	Commodities	Geological Province	Geological Age	Deposit Model
Millars/Big Tree/PingQue	Union Reefs Project	13.7244°S 131.796°E	Historic Mine	Gold	Pine Creek Orogen	Paleoproterozoic	
MLS167	Carbine, Central Tanami Project, Dogbolter, Harleys, Phoenix, Redback SE	20.4058°S 129.667°E	Historic Mine	Gold	Tanami Orogen	Proterozoic	
MLS168	Camel Bore, Central Tanami Project, Jims Main	20.1581°S 129.6207°E	Historic Mine	Gold	Tanami Orogen	Proterozoic	
MLS180	Banjo, Beaver, Bonsai, Central Tanami Project	19.9703°S 129.4079°E	Historic Mine	Gold	Tanami Orogen	Proterozoic	Environment: unknown, Group: unknown, Type: unknown
ML 22934 - Groundrush	Central Tanami Project	19.7103°S 129.9928°E	Historic Mine	Gold	Tanami Orogen	Proterozoic	
Tanami - Newmont	Callie, Dead Bullock Soak, Tanami Project, The Granites	20.5256°S 129.9336°E	Operating Mine	Gold	Tanami Orogen	Paleoproterozoic	Environment: Metamorphic hydrothermal, Group: Orogenic, Type: Mesozonal orogenic Au
Ammaroo Phosphate	Barrow Creek 1	21.7921°S 135.8348°E	Under Development	Phosphate, (Uranium, Phosphorus oxide, Uranium oxide)	Georgina Basin		
Davies		13.5629°S 131.5653°E	Historic Mine	Gold	Pine Creek Orogen		
Coronation Hill		13.5862°S 132.6074°E	Historic Mine	Gold, (Uranium, Platinum, Palladium, Platinum group elements, Uranium oxide)	Pine Creek Orogen	Paleoproterozoic	Environment: Basin hydrothermal, Group: Unconformity-related, Type: Unconformity-related U
Nabarlek Uranium Mine	Nabarlek	12.3082°S 133.32°E	Historic Mine	Uranium oxide, Uranium	Pine Creek Orogen	Proterozoic	Environment: Basin hydrothermal, Group: Unconformity-related, Type: Unconformity-related U
Eldorado	Tennant Creek	19.6971°S 134.233°E	Historic Mine	Gold	Tennant Creek Block, Warramunga Province, Warrego Metallogenic Province	Paleoproterozoic	Environment: Regional metasomatic, Group: Metasomatic iron, Type: Iron oxide Au
Woodcutters		12.9681°S 131.1124°E	Historic Mine	Lead, Copper, Antimony, Silver, Cadmium, Zinc	Pine Creek Orogen	Proterozoic	Environment: Metamorphic hydrothermal, Group: Orogenic, Type: Orogenic Ag-Pb-Zn-Cu-Sb
Woolwonga		13.4045°S 131.5505°E	Historic Mine	Gold	Pine Creek Orogen, Mount Todd Gold Metallogenic Province	Proterozoic	Environment: Metamorphic hydrothermal, Group: Orogenic, Type: Mesozonal orogenic Au
Nobles Nob		19.7115°S 134.2901°E	Historic Mine	Gold, (Silver, Copper, Bismuth)	Tennant Creek Block, Warramunga Province, Warrego Metallogenic Province	Paleoproterozoic	Environment: Regional metasomatic, Group: Metasomatic iron, Type: Iron oxide Au
Hatches Creek		20.8861°S 135.188°E	Historic Mine	Tungsten trioxide (wolframite), Copper, Bismuth, Tungsten	Davenport Province	Proterozoic	
Roper River Iron		14.4253°S 134.1839°E	Care And Maintenance	Iron ore, (Iron)	McArthur Basin		
Moline	Northern Hercules	13.6672°S 132.15°E	Historic Mine	Gold	Pine Creek Orogen, Mount Todd Gold Metallogenic Province	Proterozoic	Environment: Metamorphic hydrothermal, Group: Orogenic, Type: Mesozonal orogenic Au
Mount Wells		13.4996°S 131.713°E	Historic Mine	Tin, Copper	Pine Creek Orogen	Proterozoic	Environment: unknown, Group: unknown, Type: unknown
Callie	Tanami Project	20.5266°S 129.9249°E	Operating Mine	Gold	Tanami Orogen	Paleoproterozoic	Environment: Metamorphic hydrothermal, Group: Orogenic, Type: Mesozonal orogenic Au
Tiwi		11.36°S 130.83°E	Historic Mine	Zircon, Rutile, Ilmenite, Leucoxene			
Quest 29	Mount Bundy Project	12.9569°S 131.5876°E	Historic Mine	Gold	Pine Creek Orogen	Proterozoic	
Toms Gully	Mount Bundy Project	12.831°S 131.5608°E	Historic Mine	Gold	Pine Creek Orogen, Mount Todd Gold Metallogenic Province	Proterozoic	
Bootu Creek	Chugga, Gogo, Shekuma, Tourag, Xhosa	18.6998°S 134.1258°E	Care And Maintenance	Manganese ore, (Manganese)	Tomkinson Province		
Mls119-133	Central Tanami Project, Tanami Mine JV	19.9725°S 129.7088°E	Historic Mine	Gold		Paleoproterozoic	
Zapopan		13.4756°S 131.4376°E	Historic Mine	Silver, Gold, Lead	Pine Creek Orogen, Mount Todd Gold Metallogenic Province	Proterozoic	
Dead Bullock Soak	Colliwobble Ridge, Dead Bullock Ridge, Fumarole, Tanami Project, Villa	20.5256°S 129.9336°E	Historic Mine	Gold	Callie, The Granites-Tanami Block	Paleoproterozoic	Environment: Metamorphic hydrothermal, Group: Orogenic, Type: Mesozonal orogenic Au
Rustlers Roost	Mt Bundy Project	12.917°S 131.4984°E	Historic Mine	Gold	Pine Creek Orogen, Mount Todd Gold Metallogenic Province	Proterozoic	
Gove		12.2611°S 136.837°E	Operating Mine	Bauxite, (Alumina)	Carpentaria Basin	Cenozoic	
Orlando	Tennant Creek	19.4387°S 134.0281°E	Historic Mine	Copper, Gold, Silver, (Bismuth)	Tennant Creek Block, Warramunga Province, Warrego Metallogenic Province	Paleoproterozoic	Environment: Regional metasomatic, Group: Metasomatic iron, Type: Iron oxide Au
Glencoe	Burnside project	13.4397°S 131.504°E	Historic Mine	Gold	Pine Creek Orogen, Mount Todd Gold Metallogenic Province	Proterozoic	
Mount Bonnie		13.5417°S 131.549°E	Historic Mine	Zinc, Silver, Gold, Lead, (Copper)	Pine Creek Orogen, Mount Todd Gold Metallogenic Province	Proterozoic	
Molyhil		22.7571°S 135.7493°E	Under Development	Molybdenum, (Copper, Molybdenite, Tungsten, Tungsten trioxide (wolframite), Iron)	Arunta Orogen, Aileron Province	Proterozoic	
Juno		19.7033°S 134.2407°E	Historic Mine	Gold, Silver, (Copper, Bismuth)	Tennant Creek Block, Warramunga Province, Warrego Metallogenic Province	Paleoproterozoic	Environment: Regional metasomatic, Group: Metasomatic iron, Type: Iron oxide Au
Frances Creek	2, 3, 4, 5, 6/7, 9, Elizabeth Marion, Extended, Helene 1, Rosemary, Thelma	13.5642°S 131.85°E	Operating Mine	Iron ore, (Iron)	Pine Creek Orogen	Proterozoic	
Bridge Creek	Burnside Project	13.4403°S 131.3195°E	Historic Mine	Gold	Pine Creek Orogen, Mount Todd Gold Metallogenic Province	Paleoproterozoic	
Brocks Creek	Burnside Project	13.4765°S 131.4379°E	Historic Mine	Gold, Silver	Pine Creek Orogen, Mount Todd Gold Metallogenic Province	Proterozoic	
Gecko	K44	19.4354°S 134.0661°E	Historic Mine	Copper, (Gold, Bismuth)	Tennant Creek Block, Warramunga Province, Warrego Metallogenic Province	Paleoproterozoic	Environment: Regional metasomatic, Group: IOCG, Type: Magnetite-dominant IOCG
Tanami (Central)	Central Tanami Project	19.9679°S 129.7122°E	Historic Mine	Gold, Silver	Callie, The Granites-Tanami Block	Proterozoic	
Howley	Burnside Project	13.498°S 131.3455°E	Care And Maintenance	Gold	Pine Creek Orogen, Mount Todd Gold Metallogenic Province	Paleoproterozoic	
Fountain Head	Burnside Project	13.4667°S 131.5061°E	Historic Mine	Gold	Pine Creek Orogen	Proterozoic	
Groote Eylandt		13.9922°S 136.4455°E	Operating Mine	Manganese ore, (Manganese)	Carpentaria Basin		
Chinese Howley	Burnside Project	13.5099°S 131.3575°E	Historic Mine	Gold	Pine Creek Orogen, Mount Todd Gold Metallogenic Province	Paleoproterozoic	
Eva	Pandanus Creek	17.681°S 137.8196°E	Historic Mine	Uranium, Gold, (Uranium oxide)	Mount Isa Orogen, Murphy Inlier		
Union Reefs	Union Reefs Project	13.714°S 131.7905°E	Care And Maintenance	Gold, (Silver)	Pine Creek Orogen, Mount Todd Gold Metallogenic Province	Proterozoic	Environment: Metamorphic hydrothermal, Group: Orogenic, Type: Mesozonal orogenic Au
Mount Porter		13.634°S 131.821°E	Under Development	Gold	Pine Creek Orogen	Proterozoic	
Chariot	Tennant Creek Mineral Field	19.654°S 134.0969°E	Historic Mine	Gold	Warramunga Province	Proterozoic	Environment: Regional metasomatic, Group: Metasomatic iron, Type: Iron oxide Au
McArthur River zinc mine	McArthur River, HYC	16.436°S 136.0985°E	Operating Mine	Zinc, Lead, (Silver, Copper, Cadmium, Antimony)	McArthur Basin	Paleoproterozoic	Environment: Basin hydrothermal, Group: Sediment-hosted, Type: Siliciclastic-carbonate Zn-Pb
Spring Hill	Spring Hill Gold Project	13.608°S 131.7176°E	Historic Mine	Gold	Pine Creek Orogen, Mount Todd Gold Metallogenic Province	Proterozoic	
Mud Tank		23.0081°S 134.2655°E	Closed	Vermiculite	Arunta Orogen, Aileron Province	Neoproterozoic	Environment: Supergene, Group: Laterite, Type: Carbonatite laterite REE
Goodall		13.2113°S 131.3731°E	Historic Mine	Gold	Pine Creek Orogen, Mount Todd Gold Metallogenic Province	Paleoproterozoic	
Pine Creek	Czarina, Enterprise, Gandy's Hill, International, South Gandy	13.8257°S 131.8287°E	Historic Mine	Gold, (Silver)	Pine Creek Orogen, Mount Todd Gold Metallogenic Province	Proterozoic	Environment: unknown, Group: unknown, Type: unknown
Ranger Uranium Mine	Ranger	12.6735°S 132.9185°E	Closed	Uranium, (Uranium oxide)	Pine Creek Orogen	Proterozoic	Environment: Basin hydrothermal, Group: Unconformity-related, Type: Unconformity-related U
Warrego		19.4448°S 133.8237°E	Historic Mine	Gold, Copper, Bismuth, Iron ore, Silver, (Iron)	Tennant Creek Block, Warramunga Province, Warrego Metallogenic Province	Paleoproterozoic	Environment: Regional metasomatic, Group: IOCG, Type: Magnetite-dominant IOCG
Maud Creek	Gold Creek, Maud Creek Project	14.4431°S 132.454°E	Historic Mine	Gold	Pine Creek Orogen	Proterozoic	
Central Tanami		19.966°S 129.1739°E	Historic Mine	Gold	Tanami Orogen	Proterozoic	
Roper Bar	Area D, Area E, Area F, Gum Creek	15.223°S 135.074°E	Operating Mine	Iron ore, (Iron)	McArthur Basin		
Browns polymetallic ore deposit	Browns	12.9939°S 130.9975°E	Historic Mine	Lead, Cobalt, Silver, Nickel, Zinc, Copper	Pine Creek Orogen	Proterozoic	Environment: Metamorphic hydrothermal, Group: Orogenic, Type: Orogenic Cu ± Au
Iron Blow	Burnside Project	13.5137°S 131.552°E	Historic Mine	Zinc, Gold, Silver, (Copper, Lead)	Pine Creek Orogen, Mount Todd Gold Metallogenic Province	Paleoproterozoic	
Cosmo Howley	Burnside Project, Cosmopolitan Howley	13.5369°S 131.3761°E	Care And Maintenance	Gold	Pine Creek Orogen, Mount Todd Gold Metallogenic Province	Paleoproterozoic	
Redbank	Azurite, Bluff, Punchbowl, Roman Nose, Sandy Flat	17.1932°S 137.7435°E	Care And Maintenance	Copper	McArthur Basin	Proterozoic	
Merlin diamond mine	Merlin, Excalibur, Launfal, Palomides, Sacramore, Tristram, etc	16.8479°S 136.3451°E	Operating Mine	Diamond - undifferentiated, (Diamond - gem and cheap gem)	McArthur Basin		
Czarina	Pine Creek Project	13.822°S 131.8278°E	Historic Mine	Gold	Pine Creek Orogen	Proterozoic	
Esmeralda	Union Reefs Project	13.756°S 131.8299°E	Historic Mine	Gold	Pine Creek Orogen	Paleoproterozoic	
Enterprise	Pine Creek Project	13.8247°S 131.827°E	Historic Mine	Gold	Pine Creek Orogen	Proterozoic	Environment: Metamorphic hydrothermal, Group: Orogenic, Type: Mesozonal orogenic Au
Wauchope		20.5986°S 134.3297°E	Historic Mine	Tungsten, Tungsten trioxide (wolframite)	Davenport Province	Proterozoic	
Rum Jungle, Northern Territory	Rum Jungle Creek South	13.0397°S 130.9984°E	Historic Mine	Uranium, Uranium oxide	Pine Creek Orogen	Proterozoic	Environment: unknown, Group: unknown, Type: unknown
Mucketty		18.6639°S 134.0549°E	Historic Mine	Manganese, Manganese ore	Tomkinson Province		Environment: Basin chemical, Group: Manganese, Type: Sedimentary Mn
El Sherana		13.5057°S 132.5203°E	Historic Mine	Gold, Uranium oxide, Uranium	Pine Creek Orogen	Proterozoic	Environment: Basin hydrothermal, Group: Unconformity-related, Type: Unconformity-related U
Mount Burton		12.977°S 130.9636°E	Historic Mine	Copper, Uranium, Uranium oxide	Pine Creek Orogen	Proterozoic	
Ivanhoe	Tennant Creek	19.5535°S 134.0588°E	Historic Mine	Gold, Bismuth, Copper	Tennant Creek Block, Warramunga Province, Warrego Metallogenic Province	Paleoproterozoic	Environment: Regional metasomatic, Group: Metasomatic iron, Type: Iron oxide Au
Argo	Explorer 46, Tennant Creek	19.6671°S 134.22°E	Historic Mine	Gold, Bismuth, Copper	Tennant Creek Block, Warramunga Province, Warrego Metallogenic Province	Paleoproterozoic	Environment: Regional metasomatic, Group: Metasomatic iron, Type: Iron oxide Au
TC8		19.6271°S 134.15°E	Historic Mine	Copper, Silver, Gold	Tennant Creek Block, Warramunga Province	Paleoproterozoic	Environment: Regional metasomatic, Group: IOCG, Type: Magnetite-dominant IOCG
White Range	Arltunga	23.4631°S 134.766°E	Historic Mine	Gold	Arunta Orogen, Arltunga Gold Metallogenic Province, Georgina Basin	Paleozoic	
Norris		17.6736°S 137.8532°E	Historic Mine	Copper	Mount Isa Orogen, Murphy Inlier	Proterozoic	
White's		12.9849°S 131.008°E	Historic Mine	Uranium, Copper, Uranium oxide, Lead, Cobalt	Pine Creek Orogen, Mount Todd Gold Metallogenic Province	Proterozoic	
White Devil	Eldorado	19.486°S 133.9023°E	Historic Mine	Gold, Selenium, Bismuth, Copper	Tennant Creek Block, Warramunga Province	Paleoproterozoic	Environment: Regional metasomatic, Group: IOCG, Type: Magnetite-dominant IOCG
Mount Fitch (Northern Territory)	Mount Fitch	12.9468°S 130.9483°E	Historic Mine	Nickel, Copper, Cobalt, Uranium, Uranium oxide	Pine Creek Orogen	Proterozoic	
Northern Star	Tennant Creek	19.3156°S 134.1466°E	Historic Mine	Gold	Tennant Creek Block, Warramunga Province, Warrego Metallogenic Province	Paleoproterozoic	Environment: Regional metasomatic, Group: Metasomatic iron, Type: Iron oxide Au
Roper Heavy Minerals		14.4167°S 134°E	Operating Mine	Mineral sands, Heavy minerals, (Ilmenite, Magnetite)			
Mount Bundey		12.8462°S 131.593°E	Historic Mine	Iron ore, (Iron)	Pine Creek Orogen	Proterozoic	
Home of Bullion		21.5127°S 134.1564°E	Historic Mine	Copper, Zinc, (Lead, Silver, Cobalt, Gold)	Aileron Province	Paleoproterozoic	Environment: Volcanic basin hydrothermal, Group: Volcanogenic massive sulfide (VMS), Type: Bimodal-felsic VMS
Finniss Lithium Project		12.6667°S 130.7775°E	Operating Mine	Lithium, Lithium oxide			
