= Kathy Mills =

Australian Indigenous activist (1936–2022)

Kathleen Mary Mills OAM (née McGinness; 6 April 1936 – 24 April 2022), also known as Mooradoop and Aunty Kathy, was an Australian community leader, singer, Aboriginal elder and activist in the Northern Territory of Australia. She had a large family, all musical, with several of her daughters being well known as the Mills Sisters.

== Early life ==
Kathleen Mary McGinness, (Note: NLA interview summary currently (30 April 2022) says "Kathleen Irene McGinness", but she says "Kathleen Mary McGinness" clearly in the recording. I have reported this to NLA. (Laterthanyouthink)) later commonly known as Kathy Mills and also known as Mooradoop, was born on 6 April 1936 in Katherine in the Northern Territory of Australia.

Her paternal grandparents were Stephen McGinness, an Irish seaman from Dublin (about whom she wrote a poem), and prominent elder Lucy McGinness, a.k.a. Alngindabu, whose children included several leaders and activists. Their son John Francis "Jack" McGinness (a.k.a. Kingulawuy), activist and the Northern Territory's and Australia's first elected Aboriginal union leader in 1955, holding the position of NAWU president over three stints until 1963, was Kathy's father.

Her mother was Kingarli (died 1954), later called Polly Wakelin, a Gurindji woman who was removed from Wave Hill Station to Kahlin Compound, making her one of the Stolen Generation. However she did not transmit bitterness about her life, but rather passed on her Aboriginal culture.

Kathy Mills was a Kungarakung (paternal grandmother's link) and Gurindji (mother's line) woman.

== Career ==
Mills became a strong advocate for services addressing alcohol policy and alcoholism and was a key figure in the establishment of the FORWAARD alcohol rehabilitation centre in Darwin in 1967.

Mills was the first woman to be elected to the Northern Land Council, and was involved in the establishment of Batchelor College (later Batchelor Institute of Indigenous Tertiary Education).

Mills was appointed a co-commissioner for the Northern Territory to the panel of the Stolen Generations Inquiry, which produced the Bringing Them Home report and was a major factor in having the Stolen Generations issue recognised at a national level. She was also a champion of language maintenance for Aboriginal Australian languages.

She also participated in numerous NT Writers Festivals.

In 2018, she was one of a panel of three at a presentation of the film Buffalo Legends, about a "a group of men who knocked down the barriers of racism on the sporting field"and helped to forge multiculturalism in Darwin.

Her debut anthology of poetry, entitled Mookanunganuk : Selected poems by Mooradoop Kathy Mills, was published in 2020.

A theatrical work, Jarradah Gooragulli – Dance of the Brolgas , co-written with Jada Alberts and described as a blend of "storytelling, dance, music, language, cinematography, and song to tell a creation story alongside the story of two lovers" was being staged at Brown's Mart Theatre in Darwin from 17 to 28 May 2022, at the time of her death.

== Awards and honours ==
- 1986: NAIDOC national and Northern Territory Aboriginal of the Year
- 2000: Centenary Medal for "services to women, Aborigines, art and music"
- 2005: Inducted into Northern Territory Indigenous Music Awards Hall of Fame (with husband David)
- 2006: NT Senior Australian of the Year
- 2019: Order of Australia Medal for service to the Indigenous community
- 16 March 2022: Honorary Doctorate by Batchelor Institute, "in recognition of her exceptional contributions to the wellbeing of First Nations peoples throughout her life"

== Family and music ==
Mills was married to David (also born in 1936) and they had 11 children, with three alive as of 2003. Among her children are the members of musical group the Mills Sisters, (Note: Not to be confused with the Torres Strait Islander group the Mills Sisters.) who are known for their 1986 recording of Mills' song "Arafura Pearl". The whole family was musical. Parents Kathy and David were both accomplished singer/songwriters and musicians. David played guitar, steel guitar, ukulele, mandolin, and drums, and had an excellent singing voice. Kathy played the ukelele. The children include:

- Allyson (Ali), the main singer in the family;
- Robert, who played the guitar;and
- June, well known in Darwin as a cultural knowledge and Welcome to Country presenter, artist, and songwriter. June released her debut solo album I’ll Be The One on Skinnyfish Music.

=== Mills Sisters ===
The Mills Sisters consisted of: June on guitar; Ali on ukelele; Barbara on tambourine and shakers; Violet on Tbox (bush bass); and with Robin Forscutt on lead guitar. They had their first break in 1982, when they played as the support act for the Bushwackers and Bullamakanka. They later played support gigs for Harry Secombe, Charlie Pride and Tina Turner, and toured to Tamworth, New South Wales, where they earned the Australasian Buskers Award; Alice Springs (where they performed for the Pope; and to Melbourne and Sydney.

== In film ==
Kathy and her youngest brother, Speedy McGinness, feature in a 1999 documentary film called Wrap Me Up in Paperbark, about their quest to get their mother's remains returned to her traditional Gurindji country, from Darwin cemetery in Larrakia country, where she was buried.

A 26-minute documentary film about Mills and her family, entitled Arafura Pearl, was made by Indigenous filmmaker Steven McGregor and released in 2003 by the Australian Broadcasting Corporation as part of their "Message Stick" series. It is available for purchase at ABC Commercial.

Mills also features in Blown Away (2014), a documentary film directed by Danielle MacLean about Cyclone Tracy, which caused extensive damage to Darwin in 1974. The film shows previously unrecorded responses by Indigenous Darwinians to the disaster, and Mills relates how she and her family survived by cramming into a tiny storeroom underneath their house. Her song, "Arafura Pearl", also features in the film.

== Death and legacy ==
Mills died on 24 April 2022. A memorial ceremony was held for her in Darwin by family and friends on 16 May 2022.

Mills was renowned for her memory, for both songs and historical and cultural information, which could then be passed down, and she worked hard to contribute to the community of Darwin and Aboriginal people everywhere.

The local Aboriginal organisations established in Darwin as a result of her work, including the alcohol rehabilitation service FORWAARD; a women's shelter; and the Danila Dilba Health Service, remain as part of her legacy.

Her song "Arafura Pearl" is listed as an icon by the Northern Territory Heritage Society.

Arafura Pearl: A Festival of Women was established in 2020 by Tracey Bunn, as "a celebration of women in Darwin". She chose to name the festival after the song because of its connection with Darwin, and because of the Mills family consisting of many strong women. Kathy's daughter June Mills opened the inaugural edition of the festival in September 2020.
