= Stapleton Siding massacre =

Massacre in the Northern Territory, Australia

- Location: Stapleton Siding (English) / Perrmadjin (Aboriginal), Stapleton, Northern Territory
- Date: July 1895
- Attack type: Mass poisonings of Aboriginal Australians
- Deaths: 80 Kungarakany and Warray people killed
- Perpetrator: Colonists

The Stapleton Siding massacre was a massacre of Aboriginal Australians at Stapleton, Northern Territory, Australia. The massacre, which was committed by supplying poisoned damper that likely contained weed-killer, killed approximately 80 Kungarakany and Warray people.

One of the most notable survivors of the massacre was the Aboriginal elder Alngindabu, who was then a child. A description of the massacre was passed down by Kungarakany elders, including Alngindabu to her son, Aboriginal political activist Joe McGinness.
