= Ali Mills =

Ali Mills may refer to:

- Ali Mills (singer), Indigenous singer based in Darwin, Northern Territory
- Ali Mills (character), a fictional character portrayed by Elisabeth Shue in the film The Karate Kid
