= Mount Fitch =

Mount Fitch can refer to

- Mount Fitch, a subordinate peak of Mount Greylock, located in Massachusetts
- Mount Fitch, Northern Territory, a mountain of approximately 70 m in Australia, part of the old Rum Jungle, Northern Territory uranium mines near Batchelor, 64 km south of Darwin, Northern Territory.
