= Richard (Dick) Butler =

Indigenous Australian gardener (1908–1987)

Richard (Dick) Butler (1908 – 24 August 1987) was a Wugularri/Jawoyn man who became a sportsman, soldier and gardener in the Northern Territory of Australia.

Butler spent much of his early life at the Kahlin Compound and was a member of the Stolen Generations.

== Life in the Northern Territory ==
Butler was born in Katherine to a Wugularri/Jawoyn woman, who is unnamed, and a European father named George Butler and he had two brothers Ta-Digin and Merengbet. Early in his life Butler was taken from his family and placed at the Kahlin Compound, in Darwin, where he had the role of 'horse-boy'. In this position he was responsible for grooming and watering the horses that were kept there for use by the staff there.

After leaving the compound Butler continued to work with horses, first for the government secretary, Charles Barnett-Storey and, later on, for the North Australia Railway on extension works between Katherine and Larrimah. During this period Butler also distinguished himself as a capable boxer and boxing trainer and was a lightweight champion.

On 1 July 1931 Butler married Louisa Fanny Spain, whose family had immigrated from Cebu in the Philippines.

In 1939 Butler enlisted as a gunner in the Darwin Mobile Force, as a part of the 7th Military District, where he was employed, alongside other First Nations men, as artillerymen. They were stationed at Peewee Camp, at East Point, and they called themselves the "Australian Black Watch". Other Aboriginal men he served alongside included Willy McLennen, Samuel ('Smiler') Fejo, Juma ('Jim'), Bill Muir and Victor Williams. Butler almost died during first instance of the Bombing of Darwin when he was working alongside Joe McGinness.

Butler's wife, Louisa, had been evacuated to Brisbane with their 2 children throughout the war, and she returned in 1946 and she would later die during Cyclone Tracy in 1974.

After the war Butler served with the Permanent Military Forces and continued to serve with the 7th Military District until 1961. He was the first soldier to earn the Medal for Long Service and Good Conduct.

When Butler left the army he became the head gardener at Government House, Darwin where he worked until his retirement in 1978. During this period Butler also worked to create the East Point Military museum. In recognition of his 18 years of service he was celebrated by the then Administrator of the Northern Territory, John England, with a party there.

Butler was a life member of the Northern Territory Football League and the Darwin Football Club.

Butler died in Darwin on 24 August 1987.

In 2012, when talking of greater recognition of Butler and his service politician John Elferink stated in the Northern Territory Legislative Assembly:

What I like about Dick Butler is there is nothing particularly remarkable about him. He was a decent honest guy, worked for a living his whole life, and was never so profoundly ambitious to pursue lofty goals. However, in so many ways he represented the average soldier who pulled on a uniform who, in a very non-average way, was prepared to lay down his life in defence of the country, which in Dick Butler’s case did not probably look after him as well as it could have

— John Elferink, 16 February 2012

== Legacy ==
- Butler Place in Holtze, Northern Territory is named for Butler.
