= Compass Resources =

Australian mineral company

- Company type: Public
- Traded as: ASX: CMR
- Industry: Mine exploration
- Defunct: March 2023
- Headquarters: Sydney, Australia
- Key people: Gordon Toll (Chairman); Malcolm Humphreys (CEO)
- Products: cobalt, copper, gold, lead, nickel, uranium
- Revenue: $0 (2007)
- Net income: ($25 million) (2007)
- Website: www.compassnl.com.au

Compass Resources was an Australian mining and mineral exploration company that was listed on the Australian Securities Exchange .

The company's main assets were mineral resources at Browns, Browns East and Mount Fitch, adjacent to the former Rum Jungle uranium mine in the Northern Territory of Australia. Brown's consists of a multi-metal oxide deposit overlying a related sulphide deposit. Compass also has exploration rights over the site of the former uranium mine and some royalty rights on a gold mine in New South Wales.

== Mining in the Northern Territory ==
On 29 January 2009, Compass Resources went into voluntary administration, while in the process of commissioning the Brown's Oxide mine.

Compass was listed on the ASX with the fourth-largest lead deposit in the world, plus numerous other deposits with the potential value in excess of $15 billion. The company was chaired by mining magnate Gordon Toll. The company was awarded major project facilitation status by the Australian federal government and endorsed as a "Major Project of National Significance". The company formed a joint venture with Hunan Non-Ferrous Metals Corporation . As Compass undertook capital projects to develop and extract lead and other metal ores, costs appear to have blown out.

It was delisted from the ASX in August 2015. The company was deregistered in March 2023.
