= Browns polymetallic ore deposit =

Browns Oxide Project
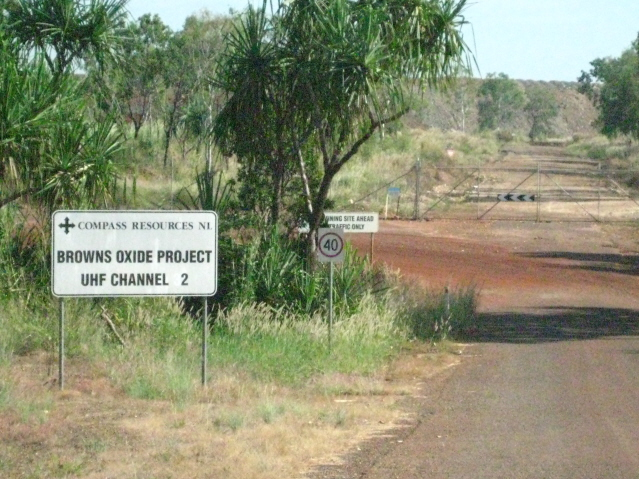
- Entry sign at the mine

- Location in Australia

Location
- Location: Mount Fitch, Northern Territory, Australia; 12°34′S 130°34′E

Production
- Products: Nickel; Copper; Cobalt

History
- Opened: 2008

Owner
- Company: Compass Resources NL
- Website: Compass website

The Browns polymetallic ore deposit is a large ore deposit located at Mount Fitch, near Batchelor, 64 kilometres south of Darwin, Northern Territory, Australia.

The Browns deposit consists of a sizeable, +80 million tonne deposit of nickel-copper-cobalt, with some poorly defined zones of uranium, and extensive zones of lead-zinc mineralization having been discovered in recent years.

== Geology ==
The Browns deposit has a quoted JORC resource of 84 million tonnes of ore grading 0.78% copper, 0.11% cobalt and 0.12% nickel. This is a global resource hosted in four separate zones;

1. Browns (40Mt @ 0.49% Cu, 4.53% Pb, 0.109% Co, 0.09% Ni, 13ppm Ag)
2. Browns East (30.5Mt @ 1.29% Cu, 1.28% Pb, 0.13% Co, 0.13% Ni, 11ppm Ag)
3. Area 55 (12.2Mt @ 0.49% Cu, 0.56% Pb, 0.14% Co, 0.14% Ni)
4. Mount Fitch (1.3Mt @ 0.60% Cu, 0.2% Co, 0.2% Ni)

The global resources are subdivided into oxide and sulfide resources. The oxide resources consist of supergene or weathered sulfide ore where the ore mineralogy is dominated by metal oxides, hydroxides, clays and carbonates after the original sulfide mineralogy.

== Exploitation ==
The Browns deposit is currently being developed as a major base metals mine by Compass Resources NL, an Australian public company, in joint venture with Hunan Nonferrous Metals Corporation, a Chinese government company.

The mine is due to be complete in August 2008, after suffering cost escalation and construction delays, and will produce 15,000 tonnes of copper, 4,000 tonnes of cobalt and 4,000 tonnes of nickel per annum, with a mine life of 30 years, mining the oxide and supergene ores. The processing plant includes solvent extraction and electrowinning processing equipment.

The sulfide resources are hosted beneath the supergene and oxide zone ores and as yet no processing plant has been built to treat the pristine sulfide ores.

On 29 January 2009, Compass Resources went into voluntary administration, while in the process of commissioning the mine.

== Mount Fitch uranium ==
In 2006, Compass Resources reported resources of 4050 tonnes U_{3}O_{8} at Mount Fitch. On 4 April 2007, Compass Resources advertised their application for a Mineral Lease over the Mt Fitch uranium deposit. Development of the uranium resources has not been advanced beyond conceptual stages.

== See also ==
- Ore genesis
- Mining
- Mineral resource classification
- Compass Resources
- Extractive metallurgy
- List of uranium mines
