= Alngindabu =

Aboriginal Australian elder (1874–1961)

- Alngindabu on the right, c. 1940
- Born: c.1874
- Died: 23 September 1961
- Other names: Lucy

Alngindabu, also spelt Alyandabu and also known as Lucy McGinness, (c.1874 – 23 September 1961), was a female senior elder (Almiyuk) from Chapana, near the Finniss River in the Northern Territory of Australia.

The Lucy Mine was named after her, and her descendants include prominent leaders and activists Joe McGinness, Val McGinness, Jack McGinness and Kathy Mills.

== Early life ==
Trained as a domestic servant from childhood, Alngindabu was named Lucy by her white bosses. She became an expert seamstress and cook. She spoke the Kungarakany language and belonged to the Kungarakany people, a group whom the Europeans called the "Paperbark People".

As a young woman Alngindabu was one of the few survivors of the Stapleton Siding massacre in 1895, which killed approximately 80 Kungarakany people. Many people were given poisoned damper in which weed killer was supposedly mistaken for baking powder.

== Marriage and family ==
Around 1900, Alngindabu married Stephen Joseph McGinness, an Irishman, and they went on to have five children: Bernard, John (Jack), Margaret, Valentine (Val) and Joseph (Joe) – all of whom were baptised as Catholics.

After Stephen was dismissed from his job, the family left for Bynoe Harbour to find work, but along the way, Lucy's brother Maranda discovered tin ore. They officially took up the Lucy Mine in October 1908, which became the McGinnesses' home. Alngindabu used an old sewing machine to clothes for her family from calico flour sacks, and sang Irish (Note: ADB says Scottish, but the long interview with Kathy Mills says that her grandfather was Irish, and they all learnt Irish songs.) folk songs, learnt from her husband, to her children. She also taught them her language and culture, including about kinship, the Country, and the Kurduk (spirits) who controlled it. She taught them ancestral Dreaming stories, including those of the Kewen (sand goanna women) and Kulutuk (doves) that protected Kungarakany land.

Stephen died in 1918, and Alngindabu was taken with her two youngest children by the Aboriginal Protection Authority to live in the Kahlin Compound in Darwin, making her one of the Stolen Generations. Her two elder sons Bernard and Jack had already found work in the areas surrounding Lucy Mine and her daughter Margaret had married so they were not also taken. During this period Alyandabu worked in the home of Judge Waters as a laundress and housemaid and returned to the compound each night to be close to her family. Her son Joe said he often experienced hunger at the compound and would eagerly await her return each night as she was sometimes able to bring back leftovers from the Judges home.

From 1918 to 1922 daughter Margaret and her husband ran the Lucy Mine, after which others took it over until 1960, when Val took up the lease again.

It is unclear when Alngindabu left Kahlin Compound but during World War II she was living in Katherine, Northern Territory and was evacuated from there to Balaklava, South Australia where she remained until 1946.

Alngindabu was described by Ted Egan as "around six feet tall (183 cm), straight as a gun barrel, black, proud, barefooted, wearing a simple cotton frock and a wide-brimmed stockman's hat. In her hand she carried a few items tied in a red handkerchief, and she puffed contentedly on a pipe as she walked". She was known for her independent spirit, generosity and devotion to her family. She became an Almiyuk, or female elder, who was custodian of special knowledge and had authority to bestow names to children. Her brother Maranda was also an elder, known as a Namiyuk (male elder).

She died on 23 September 1961 in Darwin, and was buried in the local cemetery with a Catholic ceremony. To ensure that Aboriginal spiritual obligations were adhered to, a shade-laying ceremony was later held for her at Humpty Doo Station in 1963. Her familial and cultural traditions continued through her descendants, with the most senior female family member holding the position of Almiyuk, or senior elder, of the Kungarakany people.

== Prominent descendants ==
Joe McGinness and Val McGinness both became prominent activists for Indigenous Australian rights in the 1930s, and Val was known for his musical talent.

Daughter Margaret Edwards was active in the Council for Aboriginal Rights in Melbourne in the 1960s.

John Francis "Jack" McGinness, was an activist and the Northern Territory's and Australia's first elected Aboriginal union leader in 1955, holding the position of NAWU (North Australian Workers' Union) president over three stints until 1963. He married Polly, and was the father of Kathy Mills, a prominent leader and the first woman to be elected to the Northern Land Council.

== Resources about ==
Alngindabu's son Joe McGinness wrote: Son of Alyandabu : my fight for Aboriginal rights / Joe McGinness (1991).

Detailed information about Alngindabu's life is also available through the following oral history interviews with the National Library of Australia.

- Valentine McGinness interviewed by Ann McGrath (1982) (Alngindabu's son)
- Kathy Mills interviewed by Rob Willis (2017) (her granddaughter)
