= Ali Mills (singer) =

Australian Indigenous singer

- Occupation: Singer
- Instruments: Vocals, ukulele

Ali Mills is an Indigenous singer based in Darwin, Northern Territory. She is a Larrakia woman with some Irish ancestry.

Her Kriol version of "Waltzing Matilda" sung in her Gurindji-Kungarakan language (written by her great-uncle Val McGinness) has received national airplay.

She was a member of the Darwin group the Mills Sisters' before going solo. In 2010, she released her debut solo album Waltjim Bat Matilda. She was nominated for three Deadlys in 2010 for Female Artist of the Year, Album of the Year (for Waltjim Bat Matilda) and Single of the Year (for "Waltjim Bat Matilda") and she performed at the awards ceremony.

== Discography ==
- Waltjim Bat Matilda (2010) – Skinnyfish

with Mills Sisters

- The Arafura Pearls (1987)
