= Elia Ware =

(1911–1987) soldier and Torres Strait Islander activist

Elia Ware (8 December 1911 - 10 October 1987) was a Torres Strait Islander man who served in World War II as a part of the Torres Strait Light Infantry Battalion where, as a First Nations soldier, he received significantly less pay than non-First Nations soldiers.

This inequality, and the subsequent legal battle to receive back pay, continued into the later part of his life and helped lead to ongoing advocacy and activism for his people. This included advocating for the government to hold the 1967 Australian referendum and, when successful, campaigning for it.

== Early life ==
Ware was born on Moa Island in the Torres Strait and was one of six children of Alfred Aviu Pigin Ware and Gaiba Petrie. He was born at the community of Wag which had first been settled by his family, including Uruba Demag, in the early 1900s. He was a part of the Panai clan and his totem was dangal, the dugong, which guided much of his life.

Little is known of Ware's early life but on 17 January 1936 he married Sorby Oth, also known as Mary, and they would have nine children together. Before their marriage Ware had a child Miseron Levi.

Throughout his early life Ware was employed as a seaman and labourer and one of the major jobs he undertook as a labourer was building roads on Waiben.

== World War II service ==
On 14 July 1941 Ware enlisted into the Army and was assigned to the Torres Strait Light Infantry Battalion where he served alongside primarily other Torres Strait Islander men to protect northern Australia from invasion.

As a First Nations man, Ware received only one-third of the pay of non-First Nations soldiers and, because of this, he and many of the men struck in December 1943. From their strike they were successful in having their wages increased to two-thirds of the 'standard' rate, however, this pay was given to the Chief Protector of Aboriginals and was then held in a trust account for them. This meant Ware, and the other men, did not have access to it and, any use of it, required permission to be given.

In November 1944 Ware was promoted to corporal and was then discharged on 7 September 1945. After his discharge Ware requested access to his pay from the government and it was not given which lead to a lengthy legal battle and campaigning. This issue was not resolved until 1982 when backpay was finally granted.

== Post war career and activism ==
In 1959 Ware and his family left the Torres Strait, seeking better opportunities and services, and settled in Cairns where they lived at Holloways Beach. Here Ware initially took work laying sewerage pipes but later worked in a number of other roles including farming, fishing and collecting scrap metal.

At Holloways Beach Ware was neighbors with Gladys O'Shane and they, alongside Joe McGinness, formed the Cairns Aboriginal and Torres Strait Islanders’ Advancement League in the 1960s. As a part of this League Ware represented them at the Federal Council for Aboriginal Advancement conference in April 1963 where he pushed to have Torres Strait Islander people to be recognised as a separate group; this was ratified in 1964.

In the 1960s Ware also met with various politicians and policy makers regarding his underpayment during his war service and, notably, met with the then Prime Minister Robert Menzies about this issue. Included in his complaint was that, as a Torres Strait Islander serviceman, he did not receive the same post-war benefits of other soldiers including access to war service homes. Ware also asked Menzies to call a referendum to eliminate the clauses preventing the Australian government from making laws for Aboriginal and Torres Strait Islander people. This meeting was the first of its kind and it resulted in the, ultimately successful, 1967 Australian referendum which Ware was actively involved in campaigning and fundraising for.

In 1970 Ware and his brother Bobby purchased the Coral Pearl, a prawn trawler, the fish for trochus (sea snail) in the reefs off the coast of Cairns.

== Return to the Torres Strait ==
In 1979 Ware returned to the Torres Strait, first to Waiben and then to Moa, where he continued to be politically involved. Ware wished to keep the islands free of government control and he opposed the Deed of Grant in Trust that was entered into with the Queensland government in 1985.

Ware died at Moa on 10 October 1987.

== Legacy ==
One of Ware's children is Rosie Ware, is a textile designer and printmaker, who has exhibited nationally and internationally. She has used her art to explore her fathers World War II service including in the creation of Torres Strait Light Infantry Battalion, a three paneled textile work which interweaves images of her family, military history and the Torres Strait more generally.
