= Rosie Ware =

Australian textile designer

Rosie Ware (born 1959) is a textile designer and print-maker from Thursday Island in Queensland, Australia who has exhibited national and internationally.

== Biography ==
Ware was born in 1959 on Thursday Island, one of nine children of Sorbie (née Oth) from Murray Island in the Eastern Group of Islands and father Elia Ware (Snr) from St. Paul's Village on Moa Island in the Torres Strait, who served with the Torres Strait Islander Light Battalion.

After growing up and attending business college in Cairns, Ware then worked in administration and hospitality in Canberra and Daydream Island. In 1979, Ware moved to back Thursday Island with her parents, where she established a souvenir and cultural artefact shop. Rosie is married with two daughters.

Ware produces work inspired by the maritime history, culture and environment of the Torres Strait Islands that surrounds her. "l fell in love with the first lino-printed fabric I saw, covered with cultural motifs, dugong and turtle," she has said. "But when I touched the cloth and felt the rough texture of the cotton, that was something. That's when the seed was planted for my textile career." She also spent time with then Prime Minister Tony Abbott when he visited Thursday Island.

In 1998, Ware travelled to the Tiwi lslands to investigate the textile design practices.

Her work has been exhibited at the National Gallery of Australia, Australian War Memorial and Queensland Gallery of Modern Art. She was featured in 2015 Yarn ups at the Australian National University and her artwork Torres Strait Light Infantry Battalion was featured in the exhibition For Country, For Nation at the National War Memorial, Canberra.
