= Finniss River (Northern Territory) =

River in Northern Territory, Australia

Coordinates: 12°53′13″S 130°20′16″E

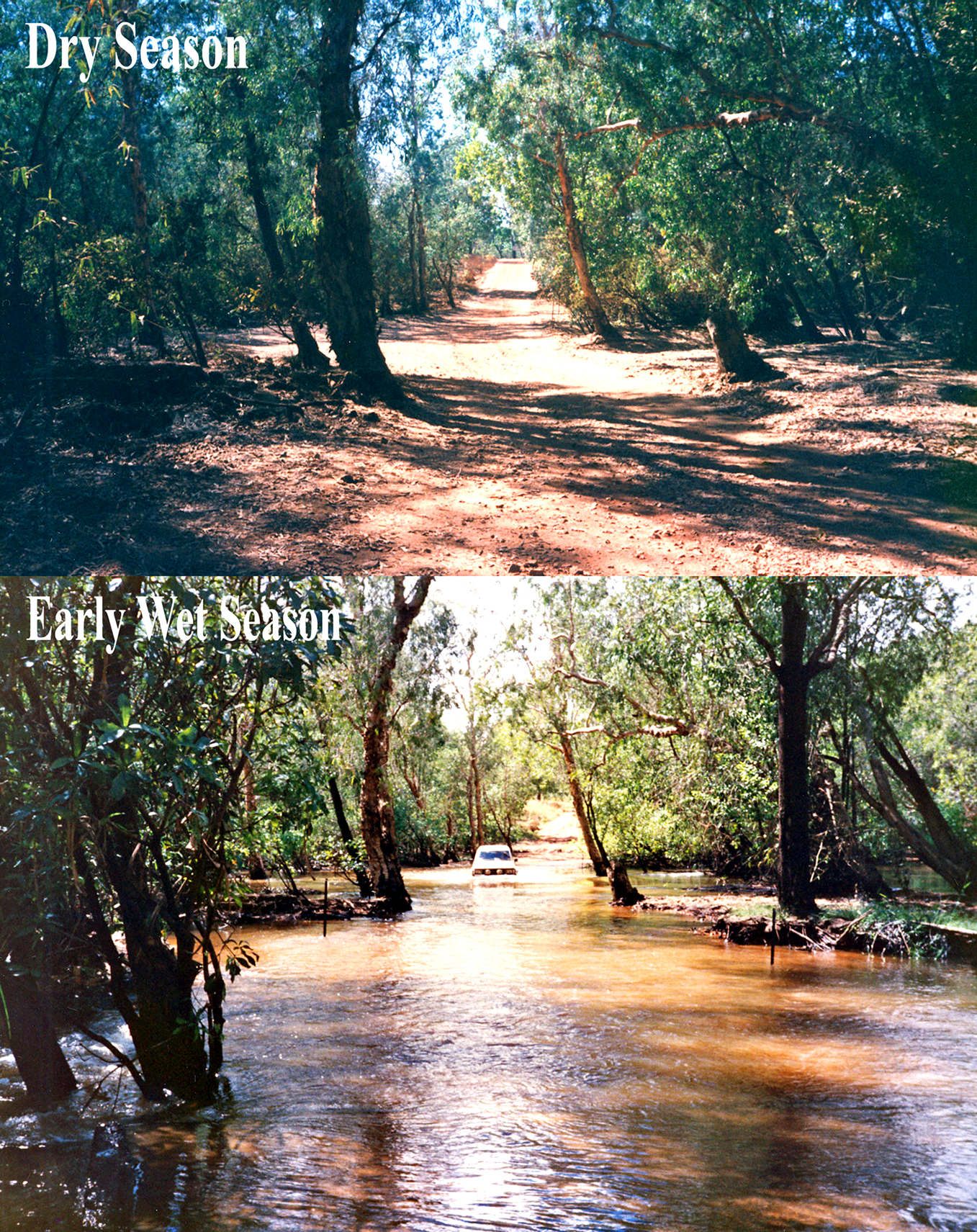
Finniss River

The Finniss River is a river south of Darwin, Australia, running west from the flank of Mount Minza, passing north of Litchfield National Park and flowing into the sea at Fog Bay. The East Branch of the Finniss was heavily polluted during the 1970s due to uranium mining at Rum Jungle mine about 105 km south of Darwin. The Finniss River Land Claim was presented to Judge John Toohey in 1981 but the former Rum Jungle mine site, contained within Area 4 of the Finniss River Land Claim (1981) was excluded from the grant to the Finniss River Land Trust due to the concerns of the Kungarakany and Warai peoples who are joint traditional Aboriginal owners of that area.

== Aboriginal heritage ==
The Kungarakan, Warai and Maranunggu peoples are traditional owners of lands in the Finniss River region. Alyandabu, who was born near the Finniss River, was a respected elder of the Kungarakan people.

== European history ==
The Finniss River was named by Frederick Litchfield after Colonel Boyle Travers Finniss who was appointed Government Resident of the Northern Territory in 1864.

== Wildlife ==
The Finniss River is well known as a popular fishing spot to catch the famous and highly prized catching and eating fish the barramundi. The river is also home to a large number of saltwater crocodiles.

In July 1979 the river was also the home of Sweetheart, a 17 foot long saltwater crocodile. Rangers captured Sweetheart but he died of accidental drowning during transportation. He is preserved and exhibited in Darwin at the Museum and Art Gallery of the Northern Territory.

== 2003 Crocodile Attack ==
In 2003 Brett Mann was killed by a 3.8m black coloured crocodile. Mann was swept away off a sand bar and downstream by rising river levels, and killed by a 3.8m crocodile. Two of his friends who were with Mann, jumped into the river to save him, and survived the ordeal by clinging onto the fork of a tree for 22 hours. The crocodile continued circling the pair all night until they were rescued by a helicopter. This incident inspired the 2007 movie Black Water.
