= Rum Jungle, Northern Territory =

Town in Northern Territory, Australia

Rum Jungle
- Town
- Coordinates: 12°59′39.8″S 131°01′22.7″E
- Country: Australia
- State: Northern Territory
- LGA: Coomalie Shire

Government
  - Territory electorate: Daly
  - Federal division: Lingiari

Population
  - Total: 84 (2016 census)
- Postcode: 0845

Rum Jungle
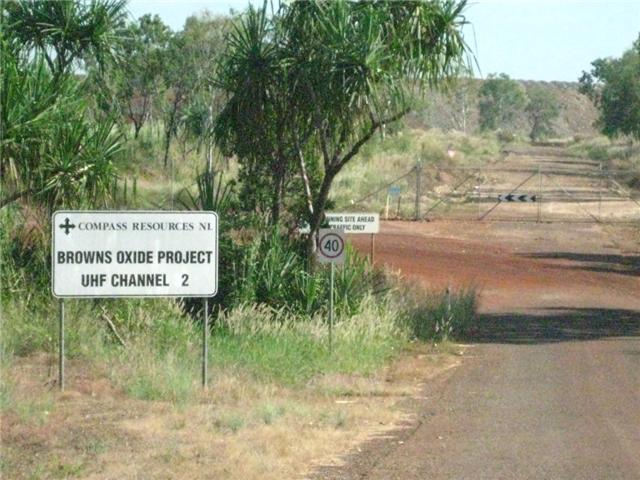
- Browns Oxide Project entry gate, 2009

- Location in Australia
- Location: Batchelor, Northern Territory, Australia; 12°59′S 131°01′E
- Products: Uranium
- Discovered: 1949
- Opened: 1950
- Closed: 1971

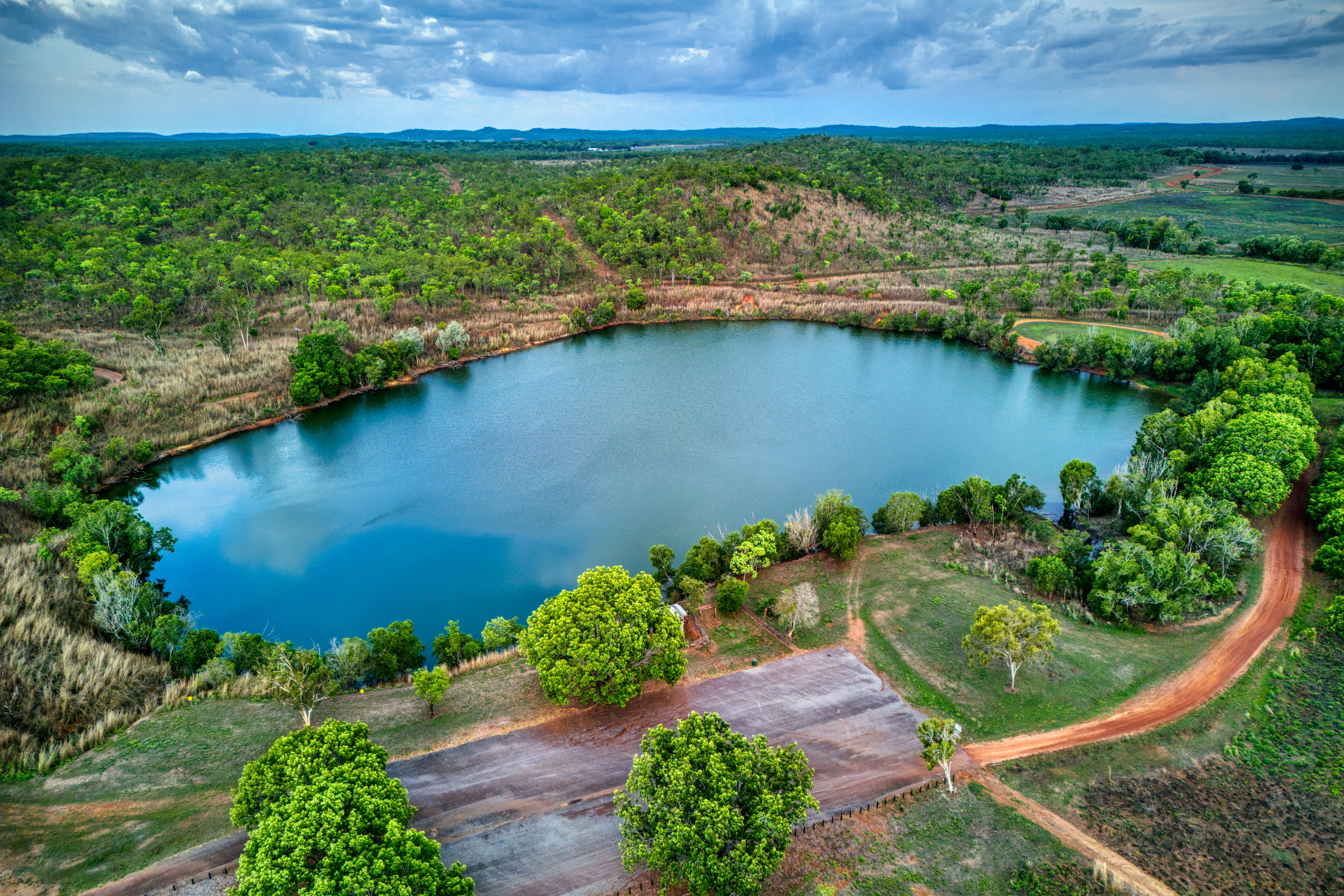
Rum Jungle Lake

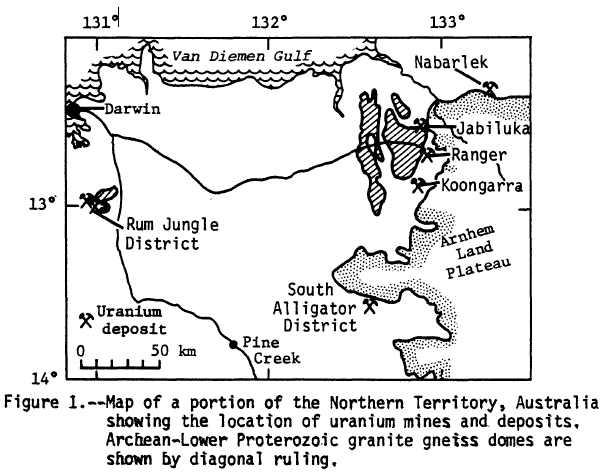
Location of key Northern Territory uranium mines

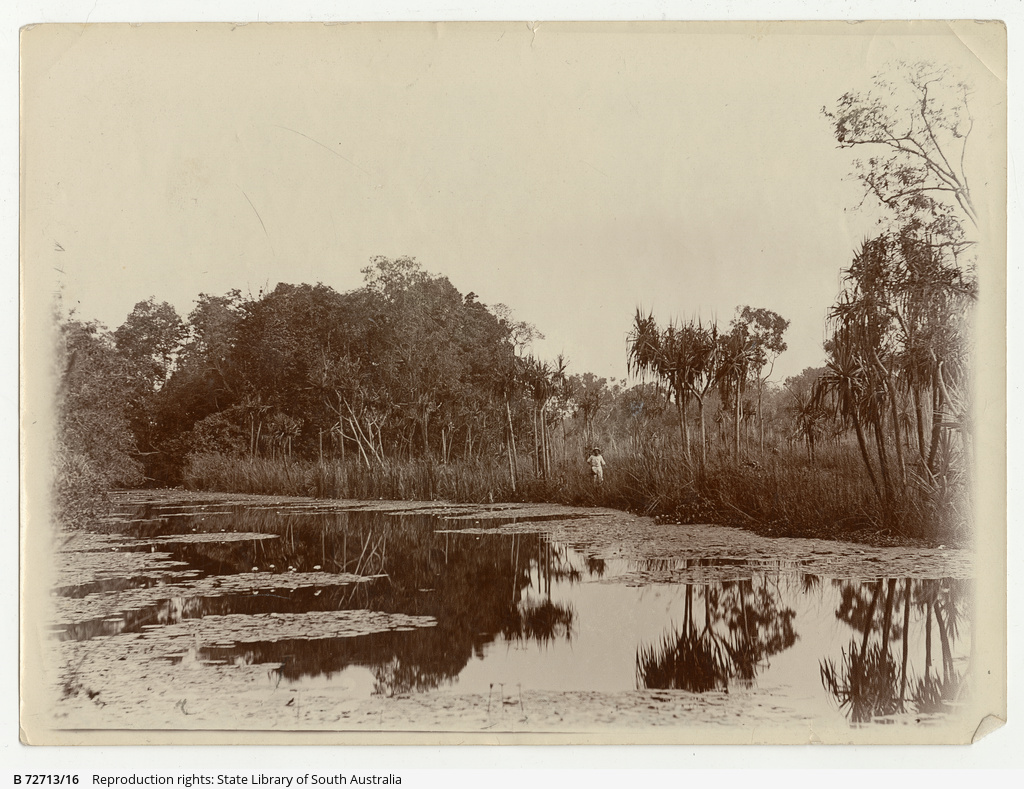
Water scene on Poett's old coffee plantation, Rum Jungle, around the start of the 20th century

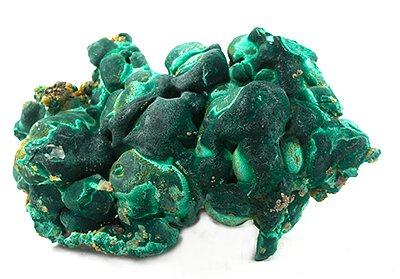
Malachite specimen from Rum Jungle, 10.5 × 6.5 × 3.2 cm

Rum Jungle or Unrungkoolpum is a locality in the Northern Territory of Australia, about 105 kilometres south of Darwin on the East Branch of the Finniss River. It is 10 kilometres west of Batchelor and shares a boundary with Litchfield National Park.

The joint traditional owners of this area are the Kungarakan and Warai peoples, and their rights to the land are recognised in the Finnis River Land Claim, which was granted in May 1981.

The European name for this area derives from an incident in March 1873 when miners from the nearby John Bull goldmine met a teamster who was carting stores between Southport and Pine Creek. The teamster tapped a cask of rum that he was carrying and shared it with locals. After waking up from the effects of the teamster's hospitality, they found that he had stolen 750 ounces (21 kg) of their gold, along with their horses, and disappeared. Searches for the thief lasted for a number of months until he and the gold were found. The name was first used when reporting the death of Patrick Flynn in November 1873.

Rum Jungle is best known as the site of a uranium deposit, found in 1949, which was mined between 1954 and 1971, producing 3,530 tonnes of uranium oxide, as well as 20,000 tonnes of copper concentrate.

== History ==
The first European person to travel to the Rum Jungle area was George Goyder in 1869. During his exploration, he noted an unidentified copper-like green ore at "Giants Reef", which was later "rediscovered" and identified to be torbernite. That discovery received minimal attention at the time and other European and Chinese people began occupying the area, especially after the discovery of gold in the 1870s. Prospectors also occasionally mined copper and other minerals on a small scale.

Those new arrivals exposed the local Aboriginal people, the Kungarakan and Warai, to a variety of illnesses and diseases, including smallpox, leprosy and tuberculosis. Aboriginal people were also subjected to trauma including the sexual exploitation of women, forced migration and massacres.

One such was the Stapleton Siding massacre in July 1895 in which 80 Aboriginal people were killed following the distribution of poisoned damper. Joe McGinness was told the story by his mother Alngindabu, who survived the massacre, and said of it:

The majority of the tribe (Kungarakany)... about one hundred people, became victims of poisoned damper... at a railway siding known as Stapleton... weed-killing powder... was supposedly mistaken for baking powder and added to the flour in preparing damper. Those who ate the poisoned damper became violently ill before their death.

— Joe McGuinness, Son of Alyandabu : My fight for Aboriginal rights (1991)

That was one of at least three poisoning incidents suffered by the Kungarakan people.

One notable early resident was Nellie Flynn, who was only about 145cm tall and who arrived in the area in 1909. There she met her future husband, Tom Flynn, who was 189cm tall, and was believed to have walked the 2,000km from Cooktown, Queensland. Nellie Flynn lived in the area until the 1970s and became a well-known character.

== Mining ==
=== Uranium mining ===
In April 1948, a notice was published in the Commonwealth of Australia Gazette that the Government was offering a rewards of £25,000 for the discovery of uranium ore in Australia. The reward was offered due to an increased demand for uranium following World War II, and the United States and Britain had identified Australia as a potential source.

In 1949, John Michael "Jack" White discovered torbernite in the shafts of old copper mines. White was a buffalo shooter, crocodile hunter and prospector, who ran a small farm in the area with his Aboriginal partner, whose name has not been disclosed. He recognised the uranium ore from a color pamphlet that had been produced as part of the announcement of the reward. He delivered his samples to the Mines Branch in Darwin on 13 August 1949, and was later able to collect the full reward. News of the discovery was published throughout Australia.

In 1952, the Australian Government funded the setting up of a mine and treatment plant to provide uranium oxide concentrate to the UK-US Combined Development Agency under a contract which ran from 1953 to 1962.

The mine was officially opened on 17 September 1954 by the Prime Minister Robert Menzies, who promised that "[t]he world will forget about atomic bombs and concentrate on using uranium for the benefit of humankind" while also talking about its importance in terms of the defence of Australia. On 13 September, days before the mine officially opened, four staff of the mine were killed when two trucks collided.

The mine was the responsibility of Commonwealth Government, through the Australian Atomic Energy Commission, although management of it was by Territory Enterprises Pty Limited, a subsidiary of the Rio Tinto Group, on a contract basis. Batchelor, a nearby town, accommodated most of the mining personnel and grew significantly at that time.

By 1959, the economically viable ore had been extracted but operations continued on a small scale until 1963. Other work continued there until April 1971, with stockpiled ore from Rum Jungle and other sites around Australia, including from Eva Creek and Adelaide River, continued to be processed. A total of 863,000 tonnes of uranium ore were processed and much was sold on the open market; some of this was also stockpiled and held in storage at Lucas Heights Reactor in Sydney.

==== Pollution and clean-up ====
The Rum Jungle mine closed in April 1971 and the 200-hectare (490-acre) site was abandoned. The Federal Government (which controlled the mine through its agency the Australian Atomic Energy Commission, now known as Australian Nuclear Science and Technology Organisation decided not to rehabilitate the mine site. The mining company Conzinc, now part of the Rio Tinto Group, which owns Energy Resources of Australia, operators of the Ranger Uranium Mine in Kakadu National Park, consistently denied any responsibility for rehabilitation. That led to the mine becoming known as one of Australia's most polluted environments, due to the oxidation of sulphides and the release of acid and metals into the east branch of the Finniss River. The 1500 mm annual rainfall, along with the pyritic mineralisation in the area, created ideal conditions for such oxidation.

An initial attempt to clean up Rum Jungle was made in 1977, following the Ranger Uranium Environmental Inquiry (1976 - 1977), which led to the setting-up of a working group to examine more comprehensive rehabilitation. A $16.2 million Commonwealth-funded program got under way in 1983 to remove heavy metals and neutralise the tailings. Of the damage to the Rum Jungle area the Commissioner of the Inquiry, Justice Russell Fox stated:

[Rum Jungle] represents to many people, not least of all the Aboriginal people, an awful example of what should not be allowed to happen.

— Justice Russell Fox, Commissioner, Ranger Uranium Environmental Inquiry, 1977

Elevated gamma radiation, alpha-radioactive dust, and significant radon daughter concentrations were detected. The levels were so high that, in the late 1980s, it was decided that something had to be done. Radiation protection standards had been revised, so that the levels of pollution were officially recognised as unsafe for human health. As a result, a supplementary $1.8 million program to improve Rum Jungle Creek South waste dumps was undertaken in 1990.

In 2003, a government survey of the tailings piles at Rum Jungle found that capping, which was supposed to help contain the radioactive waste for at least 100 years, had failed in less than 20 years. The Northern Territory and Federal Governments continued to argue over responsibility for funding rehabilitation on the polluted East Finniss River. As of 2004 contamination of local groundwater has yet to be addressed.

===== Rum Jungle Lake =====
One of the principal problems associated with rehabilitating the Rum Jungle Creek South open cut mine was that, after mining ceased, the mine pit was converted to a lake known as Rum Jungle Lake. It is considered to be the only water body in the Darwin region not infested with crocodiles and, after the mine's closure, it quickly became very popular with locals and Darwin residents as a recreation reserve, for activities including swimming, canoeing and scuba diving. In November 2010, the lake was closed to the public after a series of recordings showed low levels of radiation. After testing by the Environmental Research Institute, it was decided that the site was safe and it was reopened in October 2012. In June 2024, the Coomalie Community Government Council released a community survey regarding planned further rehabilitation works on the lake.

=== Brown's Oxide Project ===
In December 2001, Compass Resources lodged a Referral under the EPBC Act with Environment Australia. That document referred to the proposed development of a large-scale mining project, the Browns Polymetallic Project, that would produce lead, cobalt, copper, nickel and silver, over a project life of at least 15 years. As indicated in the 2001 Referral, Compass considered that the Browns Polymetallic Project was a "nuclear action" under the EPBC Act, on the basis that the project could be considered to include rehabilitating a facility or area in which mining or milling of uranium ore had previously been undertaken.

Compass suspended its work on the polymetallic proposal in 2002, after low metal prices caused the withdrawal of Compass's financial partner, Doe Run.

In 2005, Compass lodged an application for a much smaller project, focusing on cobalt, nickel and copper mining. Because that project, the Brown's Oxide Project, was much smaller than the polymetallic project proposed previously, Compass was in a position to develop it on its own.

The Northern Territory Government assessed the project and Marion Scrymgour, the Minister for Natural Resources, Environment and Heritage in the Northern Territory Government, concluded that the Browns Oxide Project, as proposed in the Public Environmental Report and subsequent documents, "can be managed without unacceptable environmental impacts".

During question time in the Northern Territory Parliament on 4 May 2006, Kon Vatskalis, the Minister for Mines and Energy, announced the approval as "good news". To ensure the environment was managed properly, the approval was subject to final review by the Commonwealth Government, under a bilateral agreement between the two governments. Pending final Commonwealth approval, the project is set to be in production by early 2007.

While the project was located near the old Rum Jungle mine, the Browns Oxide Project targeted copper cobalt and nickel, not uranium. Nonetheless, Compass acknowledged that, at some future point, it would be interested in mining uranium at the nearby Rum Jungle site, over which it held a lease. Any proposal to mine uranium would require a totally new application and environmental assessment as a separate project.

== Geology of the region ==
The major uranium prospects of Brown's, Intermediate, White's, White's extension and Dyson's, occur northwest of, but parallel to, the north-east trending Giant's Reef Fault. Ore deposits occur in Precambrian carbonaceous slate and graphitic schist of the Lower Proterozoic Brooks Creek Group. Structurally, the deposits are within a sheared anticline on the southern flank of a granite dome. Primary minerals include chalcopyrite, bornite, bournonite, pyrite, and uraninite. Oxidized ores include azurite, malachite, pseudomalachite, iron oxides, torbernite, saleeite, and phosphuranylite.

== See also ==
- Cave Divers Association of Australia
- There Are No Bugles
