= Kungarakany language =

Extinct Australian Aboriginal language

Kungarakany
- Gungaragany
- Koongurrukuñ
- Native to: Australia
- Region: Northern Territory
- Ethnicity: Kungarakan people
- Extinct: 1989, with the death of Madeline England
- Revival: 2000
- Language family: Macro-Gunwinyguan?: Kungarakany
- Dialects: Gungarakanj; ? Mukngirru

Language codes
- ISO 639-3: ggk
- Glottolog: kung1259
- AIATSIS: N14 Kungarakany, N189 Mukngirru
- ELP: Kungarakany
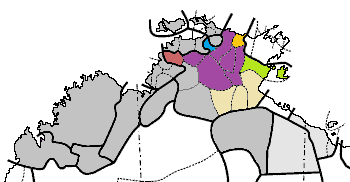
- Kungarakany (at left of colored area)

The Kungarakany language, also spelt Kungarakan, Gunerakan, Gungaragan, Gungarakanj, and Kangarraga, is an extinct Australian language spoken in the Northern Territory. Mukngirru was likely a dialect. It became extinct after the last speaker, Madeline England, died in 1989. It is currently undergoing a revival through an AIATSIS language grant and through the efforts of many dedicated people who have contributed their time, expertise and knowledge to revive this once thought extinct language.

== Revival ==
The revitalisation of the Kungarakany language has been possible through a partnership between the Batchelor Institute Indigenous Tertiary Education and the Kungarakan Culture and Education Association. This phoenix language has risen from the ashes by the efforts and contributions of many, including the historical voice recordings of George Abluk, Madeleine England and Val McGinness, and the comprehensive lexicon Ngun Koongurrkun by Senior Elder Ida Koormundum Bishop.

Koormundum persevered over 30 years to restore and revive the language, motivated by a promise to her mother Margaret Edwards (McGuinness) to record the language of Kungarakany country. This would not have been possible without the support of her relatives, tribal Elders such as, Uncles John (Jack McGinness), Val McGinness and Joseph Daniel McGinness, George Abluk, Magdeline England, Roger Yates, Jimmy Tupnook and Edith Cowan University’s Toby Metcalfe and her mentor, her mother.

== Phonology ==
=== Consonants ===
	Peripheral		Laminal	Apical	
	Labial	Velar	Palatal	Alveolar	Retroflex
Plosive	p/b	k/ɡ	c/ɟ	t/d	ʈ/ɖ
Nasal	m	ŋ	ɲ	n	ɳ
Rhotic				ɾ	
Lateral				l	ɭ
Approximant	w		j		ɻ

- /ɾ/ can also be heard as a trill [r] within vowel positions.
- A glottal [h] is also said to occur as lightly aspirated, in word-final position, after vowels /e, o, u/.

=== Vowels ===
	Front	Central	Back
Close	i		u
Mid	e		o
Open		a	

Phoneme	Allophone
/i/	[i], [ɪ]
/e/	[e], [ɛ], [ə]
/a/	[ä], [æ], [ɑ], [ɔ]
/o/	[o], [ɔ], [ʊ], [ø]
/u/	[u], [ʊ]
