= Gordon Toll =

Mining industry professional

Gordon Toll (born 1947) is a career mining industry professional and company director, with long term interests in iron ore mining and magnetite project development. In 2020 he was appointed non-executive director of Free Eyre Ltd and its subsidiary Peninsula Ports Pty Ltd, with the expectation of the company realising the Port Spencer project in South Australia ahead of the summer of 2020–21.

== Career ==
Toll joined BHP after graduating from the University of Queensland with a degree in Mining Engineering in 1968. There he helped the company establish its iron ore projects through to the mid 1970s before moving to its chief competitor, Rio Tinto. In the late 1980s to early 1990s, he was Vice President of Technology at US Borax, a subsidiary of Rio Tinto headquartered in California. He received a Master’s degree in Business Science in 1981 from Columbia University, New York, before going on to work around the world raising funds and developing mining projects in Mongolia, Brazil, Venezuela and Indonesia.

In the late 1990s, Toll was involved in the reconstruction of Savage River magnetite and pellet operations in Tasmania. Since that time Toll has acted as director and or chairman for various mining and mineral exploration companies. He was founding chairman of Fortescue (2005–2007) and chairman of Braemar Infrastructure, which seeks to develop iron ore projects in South Australia's north-east.

In 2011, Toll was an Independent non-executive director at vertically integrated steelmaker Evraz, where he was also Chairman of the Health, Safety and Environmental Committee. At the time he was also Executive Chairman of Satimola Limited, a potash development company operating in Kazakhstan.

In 2012, Toll was described as the founder and former chairman of Ferrous Resources, a Brazilian iron ore mining company and the deputy chairman of Ivanhoe Mines.

In 2014 he was a major shareholder in Royal Resources, owning 22.51% of the company. From 2014 to 2018, he was chairman of Magnetite Mines, when it was seeking to develop the Razorback prospect between Burra and Broken Hill. At the time he was soliciting Chinese engineering companies and rich individuals to invest, while approaching steel mills and commodities traders that might also buy some of the mine's product.

By 2017 Gordon Toll claimed to have raised over $5 billion in investment for projects he had associated with. Toll has also previously worked as an executive with Atlantic Richfield and Texas Gulf. Toll intends to partner with Chinese investors to enable new iron ore mines in South Australia and develop innovative solutions for the export of bulk minerals. Toll's privately owned companies include Braemar Infrastructure and Lodestone Equities. Lodestone Equities is a vehicle by which Toll buys into iron ore mining projects.

=== Oakmont Resources legal actions ===
Oakmont Resources is a start-up iron ore mining company founded in 2009 by series one Australian Masterchef contestant, Aaron Thomas. By 2014 the company had commenced mining and had mined 250,000 tonnes of iron ore in Brazil. Gordon Toll and Guy Saxton sued fellow company director Aaron Thomas for spending millions of dollars on luxury expenses that he claimed were entitlements. Aaron responded by stating that "The legal action in the UK and US is blatant thuggery instigated by questionable individuals with colourful track records" and alleged that Toll and Saxton acted “to enrich themselves, without paying what they owe to the Company”. The company directors then became the target of an unfair dismissal counterclaim by Thomas. Thomas described Toll and Saxton's actions as a "dirty tricks" campaign to increase their shareholding by ousting him from the company that he founded.

=== Appearance in Paradise papers ===
Toll appears in the ICIJ's Offshore Leaks Database as a signatory for or the ultimate beneficial owner of numerous companies located in the Isle of Man, a known tax haven. The database links two addresses to his name at the time (2009–2011), one in London and one in Monte Carlo, another known tax haven.
