= Batchelor Institute of Indigenous Tertiary Education =

Education provider in Australia

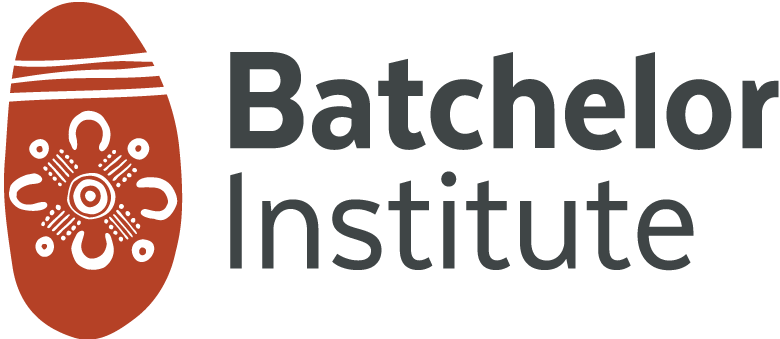
- Type: Public
- Established: 1960s
- Location: Batchelor (main campus), Northern Territory, Australia; 13.048°S 131.033°E
- Website: https://www.batchelor.edu.au/

Batchelor Institute of Indigenous Tertiary Education (BIITE, generally known as Batchelor Institute and formerly known as Batchelor College) provides training and further education, and higher education for Aboriginal Australians and Torres Strait Islanders. It is based in Kungarakany and Awarai country, in Batchelor, Northern Territory in Australia.

Batchelor Institute is classified as a 'Table A' tertiary education provider. Like an increasing number of universities, Batchelor Institute is a dual-sector institution, providing higher education and vocational education and training courses. The Institute is the first Indigenous-controlled higher education institution in Australia. It is also unusual in that most of its students are over 30 years of age, and a high proportion of its students are female.

== History ==
Batchelor Institute began in the mid-1960s as an annex of Kormilda College, a residential school for Aboriginal students on the outskirts of Darwin, Northern Territory. Short training programs were provided for Aboriginal teacher aides and assistants in community schools. In 1973 the Commonwealth government allowed Indigenous communities to determine the educational approach they wanted for their children, including bilingual education.

In 1974, the college moved to Batchelor (100 kilometres south of Darwin), a town of about 500 people. It has been at its present site since 1982.

A community-based teacher education program established at Yirrkala in 1976, was later extended to become the Remote Area Teacher Education (RATE) program, and in 1986 Batchelor College entered into a partnership with Deakin University (Melbourne) to deliver a teaching qualification known as Deakin Batchelor Aboriginal Teacher Education Program (DBATE).

A second campus of the college was established in Alice Springs in 1990 to address the educational needs of Aboriginal people from Central Australia. Other annexes were opened in Darwin, Nhulunbuy, Katherine and Tennant Creek.

The college was granted autonomy as a public sector agency in 1995. It became independent under Northern Territory legislation on 1 July 1999.

The Australian Government recognised Batchelor College as an accredited independent higher education institution through the Higher Education Funding Act 1988 and provided funding through the Higher Education Support Act 2003. This meant that BIITE could issue its own degrees and other tertiary qualifications without outside involvement, in the same way as universities, and also be funded like them.

== Campuses and annexes ==
Batchelor Institute has 15 locations throughout the Northern Territory.

=== Campus/annex locations ===
- Alice Springs
- Batchelor
- Darwin
- Katherine
- Nhulunbuy
- Tennant Creek

=== Study centre locations ===
- Borroloola
- Gunbalanya
- Maningrida
- Ngukurr
- Nyirripi
- Utopia

=== Learning centre locations ===
- Angurugu
- Wadeye

== Notable people ==
- Terry Guyula, frontman of the band Drifting Clouds, studied a Certificate IV in Screen and Media at the institute.
