= Cecil Cook (physician) =

Australian physician (1897–1985)

Cecil Cook CBE
- Born: 23 September 1897; Bexhill-on-Sea, Sussex, England
- Died: 4 July 1985 (aged 87); Sydney, New South Wales, Australia
- Education: MB, ChM (1920); MD (1929); DPH (1931); all from University of Sydney
- Occupation(s): Medical practitioner and administrator
- Known for: Establishing health system in northern Australia
- Medical career
- Profession: Chief Protector of Aborigines (1927–39)
- Field: Tropical diseases and public health

Cecil Evelyn Aufrere (Mick) Cook CBE (23 September 1897 – 4 July 1985) was an Australian physician and medical administrator, who specialised in tropical diseases and public health. He was appointed as Chief Medical Officer and Protector of Aborigines for the Northern Territory in 1927. He established much of the infrastructure of the public health system there, including four hospitals, a tuberculosis clinic, a nursing school and the Nurses’ Board of North Australia. He started the Northern Territory Aerial Medical Service together with Dr Clyde Fenton, and he was founding chairman of the Northern Territory Medical Board.

Cook served in the Army Medical Service from 1940 to 1945 where he increased the level of hygiene within the troops through education. He became the Commissioner of Public Health in Western Australia in 1946 and then joined the National Health and Medical Research Committee in Canberra in 1950 where he was able to contribute to public health.

He was controversial for his attempts to "uplift the morality" of Aboriginal people by "breeding out the colour". For later writers he has "come to personify ideologies, policies and practices of government that seem at best misguided and at worst cruel and racist".

== Early life and education ==
Cook was born on 23 September 1897 in Bexhill, Sussex, England. His mother was Emily (née Puckle), and he had an older brother, Errol Aufrere, who was born in 1895. His father, James Whiteford Murray Cook, moved to Australia soon after Cecil was born after being advised to relocate to a warmer climate due to a serious ear infection, and the family followed in 1900 to live in Barcaldine, Queensland. Dr James Cook became the Lodge doctor in Barcaldine and he was medical superintendent of the Victoria Hospital, positions he held for thirty years. He was very well regarded, credited with bringing Victoria Hospital "into a new era of respectability and service to the public".

Cook attended the Barcaldine State (primary) school for 1906-8 and was then a boarder at The Southport School, where he was the dux in 1914 and received first honours in languages, Latin and English. Cook was permanently blinded in his left eye at age 17 after an accident whilst playing with an air rifle slug. He studied medicine at the University of Sydney, living at St Andrew's College, and he graduated with MB, Ch.M. in 1920. Later he conducted a national survey of leprosy as the Wandsworth scholar (1923–25), being awarded a Doctor of Medicine in 1929, and Doctor of Public Health in 1931.

== Medical practice and further studies ==
Cook served his residency at Brisbane General Hospital. He briefly practised at Barcaldine with his father in 1919 to help deal with an epidemic of pneumonic influenza, then he worked in hospitals at Mount Morgan and Longreach before starting as a general practitioner in Hughenden. In 1921, Cook became the medical superintendent at Hugenden District Hospital and in 1922 the acting medical superintendent at Longreach District Hospital. He worked as a ship's medical officer to pay his way to London, where he attended the London School of Tropical Medicine, graduating with a Diploma of Tropical Medicine and Hygiene in 1923, and winning a Wandsworth scholarship.

Cook joined the Commonwealth Public Service in 1925. He worked at the Australian Institute of Tropical Medicine in Townsville.

=== Leprosy survey ===
As part of his MD studies, Cook conducted a major epidemiological study of leprosy in Australia. He began his study at Sydney's Prince Henry Hospital and researched leprosy and granuloma venereum over three years.

He published this report as his MD thesis The Epidemiology of Leprosy in Australia in 1927. The newly established Federal Health Council subsequently adopted leprosy as one of its concerns.

== Northern Australia Appointment ==
He was appointed the Chief Medical Officer, Chief Health Officer, Chief Protector of Aborigines and Quarantine Officer for North Australia (then separate from Central Australia, later the Northern Territory) on 1 March 1927. For the first six months he was the only medical practitioner in the state, and after that he focused on establishing a public health system. From 1929 to 1939, he established general hospitals at Katherine, Tennant Creek and Alice Springs, a hospital outside Darwin to treat leprosy, a training school for nurses, a tuberculosis clinic and a medical benefit fund. He also commenced infant welfare services and founded the Nurses’ Board of North Australia in this time. In 1934 he joined forces with Dr Clyde Fenton to launch the Northern Territory Aerial Medical Service under the umbrella of the Australian Aerial Medical Service, which later became the (Royal) Flying Doctor Service.

In 1930, he took leave to study anthropology and public health in Sydney.

=== "Half-caste" assimilation ===
Cecil Cook worked to assimilate "half-castes", an old term used to describe a child who had an Aboriginal parent, usually the mother, and a white parent, and Aboriginals into "white society" through marriage licenses and employment opportunities. As Chief Protector of Aborigines, Cook was involved in marital affairs concerning "half-caste" women. With support from the North Australian Workers' Union, he was able to prohibit their request for marriage if he deemed it necessary. Cook advocated for marriages between "half-caste" women and white men under his policy of “breeding out colour” and the assimilation of Aborigines into white society. He believed by the fifth or sixth generations "half-caste" children would not display any Aboriginal characteristics. During his time as Protector, 69 of these marriages took place. Cook also had the ability to deny full citizenship to "half-castes" when they turned 21.

Cook wrote to the Head Administrator of the Northern Territory in 1933 about the idea of sterilising "half-castes". He wrote mentally defective "half-caste" children were an economic burden, and he could not see them being able to marry a white man and therefore their children would be costly to the government. Cook went on further to ask the Crown Law Officer if he had the power to give consent for a "half-caste's" sterilisation. Ultimately, Cook's request was denied.

=== Supporting Aboriginals ===
Cecil Cook worked with pastoralists to improve the working conditions for Aboriginal employees. In 1930 Aboriginal employees were given additional rations for relatives who were residents on pastoral properties and money was transferred into personal trust accounts. Cook helped to set up an Aboriginal Medical Benefit Fund, which ran from 1932 to 1933, whereby the employers of Aborigines would contribute funds.

In his role as Chief Protector, Cook extended his duties to the criminal justice system. In a 1934 tribal spearing case an aboriginal man, Tucker, was sentenced to the death penalty but was let free of his charges after Cook fought for the case to be taken to the high court.

Cook supported Aboriginals having the right to the ownership of their land. He suggested that mining companies at Tennant Creek in 1934 should pay royalties to the Warumungu people. This did not take place, but the miners were banned from entering settled areas.

=== The Bagot Aboriginal Reserve and the Kahlin Compound ===
Cecil Cook continued to advocate for the assimilation of "half-castes" and Aborigines into white society. In 1935 he requested the government erect residential areas for Aboriginals in a policy proposal that urged the government to integrate "half-caste" and Aboriginal society. The first institute, the Bagot Aboriginal Reserve, was established in 1938 and was populated by Aboriginals from the Kahlin Compound. These areas were designed to help non tribal Aborigines assimilate into society by having proper accommodation, education, sanitation and trained skills for employment opportunities.

Cook integrated 400 "half-castes", predominantly females, into the Kahlin Compound and other "half-caste" homes whilst he was Chief Protector of Aborigines. He advocated for the standard of education to be increased to the same quality found in the public schools in Northern Australia and he began to train some girls at the Kahlin Compound in nursing. Through his assimilation policy, Cook found employments for the female "half-caste" residents in private homes, as trainee nurses and in the Compound and other similar homes where they worked before becoming married. For male "half-castes" he found 25 apprenticeships in the pastoral industry.

=== Film censorship ===
In 1929, the Australian Government began to censor films shown to Aborigines. Cook publicly supported Chief Censor Walter Cresswell O'Reilly of the Commonwealth Censorship Board. Cook had already restricted Aboriginal access to the cinemas to two nights a week and banned attending the circus altogether. In addition to their restricted access, Cook further organised for a permit and identification system for Aborigines and "half-castes" to present when attending the cinema.

He successfully asked O’Rielly to increase the censorship to include films that displayed violence between a white person and a person of colour. Whilst he agreed with many of the banned films listed by the Commonwealth Censor, Cook disapproved of films such as 'White Shadows in the South Seas' by Cosmopolitan Pictures, which was censored due to it displaying a relationship between a white man and a coloured girl. There were also films that were not banned such as the 1929 ‘The Pagan’ depicting a heroic coloured man throwing a white villain overboard, which Cook believed should have been censored.

Before the end of his role as Chief Protector Cook had begun plans for a cinema that featured only censored films near the Kahlin Compound but this was never completed.

Films censored with support from Cecil Cook
Year	Film	Director	Production company	Notes on censorship
1928	White Shadows in the South Sea	W. S. Van Dyke	Cosmopolitan Pictures, USA	Cook did not agree on this removal by Walter O’Reilly based on relationships between races
1931	Danger Island	Ray Taylor	Universal Pictures, USA	Removed based on Cecil Cook's request to monitor films displaying coloured vs white violence
1932	A passport to Hell	Frank Lloyd	Fox Pictures Corporation, USA	Cook and O’Reilly agreed on the removal of this film which displayed a morally questionable white female
1932	Bird of Paradise	King Vidor	RKO Radio Pictures, USA	Cook did not agree on this removal by Walter O’Reilly based on relationships between races
1932	Kongo	William Cowan	Metro-Goldwyn-Mayer, USA	Cook did not agree on this removal by Walter O’Reilly based on relationships between races
1932	Roar of the Dragon	Wesley Ruggles	Radio Pictures, USA	Cook and O’Reilly agreed on the removal of this film which displayed the abduction of a white women by a non-Caucasian
1933	A night in Cairo	Sam Wood	Metro-Goldwyn-Mayer, USA	Cook and O’Reilly agreed on the removal of this film which displayed the abduction of a white women by a non-Caucasian
1933	Nagana	Ernest L. Frank	Universal Pictures, USA	Removed based on Cook's request to monitor films displaying coloured vs white violence
1933	White Woman	Stuart Walker	Paramount Pictures, USA	Cook and O’Reilly agreed on the removal of this film which displayed a morally questionable white female
1934	Caravan	Erik Charell	Fox Film Corporation, USA	Cook and O’Reilly agreed on the removal of this film which displayed the abduction of a white women by a non-Caucasian
1934	Tarzan and His Mate	Cedric Bibbons	Metro-Goldwyn-Mayor, USA	Removed based on Cook's request to monitor films displaying coloured vs white violence
1935	Sanders of the River	Zoltan Korda	London Films, UK	Cook disagreed with the exclusion of this film
1938	Her Jungle Love	George Archainbaud	Universal Studios, USA	Cook did not agree on this removal by Walter O’Reilly based on relationships between races
1938	The Drum	Zoltan Korda	London Films, UK	Colonial propaganda riots in Bombay caused this film to be censored for Aboriginal viewers
1939	Drums Along the Mohawk	John Ford	Twentieth Century Fox, USA	Removed based on Cecil Cook's request to monitor films displaying coloured vs white violence
1939	Tarzan Finds a Son!	Richard Thorpe	Metro-Goldwyn-Mayor, USA	Removed based on Cook's request to monitor films displaying coloured vs white violence
1940	Strange Cargo	Frank Borzage	Metro-Goldwyn-Mayer, USA	Cook and O’Reilly agreed on the removal of this film which displayed a morally questionable white female
1941	Tarzan's Secret Treasure	Richard Thorpe	Metro-Goldwyn-Mayer, USA	Cook and O’Reilly agreed on the removal of this film which displayed the abduction of a white women by a non-Caucasian

=== Racial views and controversy ===
Growing public criticism of the exploitation and abuse of Aboriginal people led to passing the Aboriginals Protection and Restriction of the Sale of Opium Act 1897 in Queensland. This Act created the first official state control of Indigenous Australians in Queensland, including health. It authorised establishment of government reserves for Aboriginal people, and it led in 1904 to the appointment of a Chief Protector of Aborigines within the department of the Home Secretary. However its aims of protecting Aboriginal people were not realised: overcrowding, inadequate provisions and housing led to mortality rates which peaked at 13 per cent annually. While there were some improvements during the 1920s and 1930s, they remained triple the national average.

However, there was also a widespread view among ruling white Australians at the time that aborigines were "unfit" to be counted among Australian society. Those of mixed race were considered especially difficult. The rise of the eugenics movement and "social Darwinism" about this time resulted in a good deal of pseudo-scientific commentary about the place of people of "mixed blood". As a government official, Cook was placed in the position of needing to appease these forces.

Cook irritated Alice Springs residents by urging them to allow Aboriginal patients in a proposed hospital and by allowing a Catholic mission. He also sought to protect "full-bloods" from unauthorised visitors. However, he generally opposed church missions and favoured assimilation. Hence, when it came to Aboriginal people he argued for "breeding them out" and stated:

generally by the fifth and invariably by the sixth generation, all native characteristics of the Australian Aborigine are eradicated. The problem of our half-castes will quickly be eliminated by the complete disappearance of the black race, and the swift submergence of their progeny in the white.

He also instituted the "dog tag" system of fingerprinting and medical examination of Aboriginal people.

== Involvement in public health ==
Cecil Cook joined the Army Medical Service in 1940. He served as RMO 2 Armoured Regiment and Lecturer in Military Hygiene in Sydney until 1941. From 1941 to 1943 Cook was a malaria pathologist for the 2/12 AGH, AIF. He was posted to a hospital in Ceylon where he worked 12-hour shifts focusing on treating patients with malaria. Cook studied different ways to treat malaria on 33 different patients at 12AGH and used his research to write a paper on treating the disease.

In 1943 he became the Deputy Assistant Director of Hygiene with 2 Australian Corps where he gave lectures in a comprehensive training program for the troops at a base in Cairns. In this role he travelled to Papua New Guinea where he treated an outbreak of scrub typhus in the army troops, whilst also researching its cause and concluding it was the result of sleeping on the floor and neglecting to wear repellent clothing.

Cook became the Deputy Assistant Director HQ of Hygiene for 1 Australian Corps in August 1944 where he was soon promoted to Lieutenant Colonel. In this role he inspected the hygiene standard at camp sites in Papua New Guinea. He was tasked with post-battle duties at Tarakan and British North Borneo. Cook returned home in November 1945 and was treated in early 1946 for dermatitis on his hands and face.

=== Public health in Western Australia ===
In 1946 Cecil Cook became the Commissioner of Public Health in Western Australia and in 1947 the state's Principle Medical Officer. Through accepting the role of Western Australia's Commissioner of Public Health, Cook was able to join the National Health and Medical Research Council as well. Early on into his role, Cook published his correspondence to the Minister of Mines and Health in the West Australian newspaper to publicise the lack of trained nurses and medical funding in Western Australia.

Cook formed the State Health Council in 1949 where he chaired meetings on health and medical issues. The formation of this council allowed Cook to correspond directly with the Health Minister. In his role as Commissioner of Public Health he elevated the role of full-time health inspectors, increased the assessment of still births to help determine the causation, proposed a bill on the safe production, sale and distribution of milk that was later passed, and he wrote major reports on North-West Australia and Native Health.

=== Public health in NSW ===
After his work in Western Australia Cook moved to Canberra where he was closer to his family. In 1950 he spent 7 weeks inspecting the health in 53 Aboriginal communities. The survey and report he published of this inspection lead to the Native Welfare Conference in 1951.

In 1950 he became the Liaison Officer and Covenor of the National Health and Medical Research Committee. He contributed to founding the Australian Institute of Aboriginal studies in 1962 and was part of the Human Biology Committee connected to it. Cook was a senior member of the Commonwealth Department of Health from 1920 until his retirement in 1962. In the year before his retirement, Cook fractured his tibia and both kneecaps in a car accident.

In retirement, Cook was still a member of the National Health and Medical Research Committee. In addition to this work he joined Abbott Laboratories in 1962 to help create Erythrocin to the standards of the Nation Health and Medical Research Committee. In 1963 the World Health Organization invited Cook to write a survey on the Public Health legislation in Bangkok and to inspect their administration and health services. Whilst there Cook assisted the Bangkok Municipal Council and recommended a development plan for public health.

== Personal life ==
Cook married Jessie Winifred Miller on 4 March 1924. They had two sons, Murray and Wallie, who both attended the University of Sydney, and a daughter Robin. Jessie died in 1978.

In 1978, Cook moved to Burleigh Heads shortly after his wife's death. In 1981 he broke his femur while crossing the road when a car hit him. By 1984 his sons moved him to a nursing home in Sydney.

He died on 4 July 1985 at Wahroonga, Sydney, and was cremated.

== Awards and recognition ==
- 1935 - CBE (Commander of the Order of the British Empire)
- 1936 - Cilento medal
