= Kungarakany =

Aboriginal Australian people of the Northern Territory

The Kungarakany people, also spelt Koongurrukuñ, Kungarrakany, Kungarakan and other variants, are an Aboriginal Australian people of the Northern Territory. They were called the "Paperbark People" by European settlers.

== Country ==
Norman Tindale estimated their tribal lands covered approximately 2,000 square miles (5,200 km^{2}). They included the inland area north-east of Mount Litchfield, around the mid-waters of the Reynolds River and the headwaters of the Adelaide River. Their north-eastern limits were close to Rum Jungle and Batchelor. Kungarakan traditional land encompasses Adelaide River, Batchelor, Rum Jungle, Finniss River, Litchfield Park, and Berry Springs, including the Territory Wildlife Park.

== Alternative names ==
They were known to European settlers as the "Paperbark People". Alternative names and spellings include:

- Gunerakan
- Kangarraga
- Kangarranga
- Warnunger
- Ungnakan

== Notable people ==
- Alngindabu, Aboriginal elder
- Joe McGinness, Aboriginal rights activist
- Kathy Mills, first woman on the Northern Land Council
- Marlon Motlop, footballer and musician (on his mother's side)
- Tom Calma, Chancellor of the University of Canberra
- Val McGinness, Aboriginal rights activist
- Vai Stanton, Aboriginal rights activist

== Sources ==
- Basedow, Herbert (1907). "Anthropological notes on the Western Coastal tribes of the Northern Territory of South Australia". Journal of the Transactions of the Royal Society of South Australia. 31: 1–62.
- Foelsche, Paul (1895). "On the Manners, Customs, &c., of some Tribes of the Aborigines in the neighbourhood of Port Darwin and the West Coast of the Gulf of Carpentaria, North Australia". The Journal of the Anthropological Institute of Great Britain and Ireland. 24: 190–198. JSTOR 2842215.
- Stanner, W. E. H. (December 1933). "Ceremonial Economics of the Mulluk Mulluk and Madngella Tribes of the Daly River, North Australia. A Preliminary Paper". Oceania. 4 (2): 156–175. doi:10.1002/j.1834-4461.1933.tb00098.x. JSTOR 40327457.
- Stretton, W. G. (1893). "Customs, rites and superstitions of the aboriginal tribes of the Gulf of Carpentaria" (PDF). Journal of the Royal Geographical Society of Australia (Adelaide Branch). 17: 227–253. Archived from the original (PDF) on 21 January 2018.
- Tindale, Norman Barnett (1974). "Kungarakan (NT)". Aboriginal Tribes of Australia: Their Terrain, Environmental Controls, Distribution, Limits, and Proper Names. Australian National University. ISBN 978-0-708-10741-6. Archived from the original on 20 March 2020.
