= Northern Land Council =

Organisation in Northern Territory, Australia

The Northern Land Council (NLC) is a land council representing the Aboriginal peoples of the Top End of the Northern Territory of Australia, with its head office in Darwin.

While the NLC was established in 1974, its origins began in the struggle of Australian Aboriginal people for rights to fair wages and land, including the strike and walk off by the Gurindji people at Wave Hill cattle station in 1966, as well as other activities relating to Indigenous land rights.

== History ==
The Commonwealth Government of Gough Whitlam set up the Aboriginal Land Rights Commission, a Royal Commission, in February 1973 to inquire into how land rights might be achieved in the Northern Territory. Justice Woodward's first report in July 1973 recommended that a Northern Land Council and a Central Land Council be established in order to present to him the views of Aboriginal people.

In response to the report of the Royal Commission a Land Rights Bill was drafted, but the Whitlam government was dismissed before it was passed. The Aboriginal Land Rights (Northern Territory) Act 1976 was eventually passed by the Fraser Government on 16 December 1976 and began operation on Australia Day, that is 26 January 1977.

This Act established the basis upon which Aboriginal people in the Northern Territory could, for the first time, claim rights to land based on traditional occupation. In effect it allowed title to be transferred of most of the Aboriginal reserve lands and the opportunity to claim other land not owned, leased or being used by someone else.

The Northern Land Council was established in 1974.

Kathy Mills was the first woman to be elected to the Northern Land Council.

== Function ==
The most important responsibility of the councils is to consult traditional owners and other Aboriginal people who have an interest in Aboriginal land about land use, land management and access by external tourism, mining and other businesses. This sometimes involves facilitating group negotiation and consensus-building among scores of traditional Aboriginal landowner groups, and many other affected Aboriginal people.

Many Aboriginal people in the Northern Land Council's area live in the major towns. As of 2012 there were about 200 communities scattered over Aboriginal land in the NLC's area, ranging in size from small family groups on outstations to settlements of up to 3,000 people.

== Governance ==
The Northern Land Council is a representative body with statutory authority under the Aboriginal Land Rights (Northern Territory) Act 1976. It also has responsibilities under the Native Title Act 1993.

It is one of four in the Northern Territory. and the largest; the others are:

- the Central Land Council (CLC) covering the southern half
- the Tiwi Land Council covering the Tiwi Islands north of Darwin
- the Anindilyakwa Land Council covering Groote Eylandt in the Gulf of Carpentaria.

The Full Council is the major decision-making body, as of 2021 consisting of 78 elected members and five co-opted women, making 83 members in total. There is also an Executive Council and Regional Councils.

The NLC’s jurisdiction covers seven regions: Darwin/ Daly/ Wagait; West Arnhem; East Arnhem; Katherine; Victoria River District (VRD); Ngukurr; and Borroloola/ Barkly.

== Offices ==
The head office is located in Darwin.

The NLC's Top End zone is divided into seven regions with regional offices. The head office and Royalties Office are in the city of Darwin.

Regional offices representing the seven districts are in:

- Katherine
- Jabiru (West Arnhem)
- Nhulunbuy (East Arnhem)
- Tennant Creek
- Ngukurr
- Borroloola (Barkly/Borroloola)
- Timber Creek (Victoria River district)

=== People ===
Current

- Jessie Schaecken was appointed to the position of Interim CEO by the NLC’s Executive Council on 15 March 2024.

As of October 2022:

- NLC Chair is Samuel Bush-Blanasi, who has served seven terms on the council, three of those as chairman. He graduated from Kormilda College in Darwin, and is a talented artist. He was a co-founder of the Association of Northern, Kimberley and Arnhem Aboriginal Artists and of Top End Aboriginal Bush Broadcasting Association.
- Joe Martin-Jard was appointed acting CEO on 16 July 2021, and has been CEO since 22 December 2021. He was formerly CEO of the Central Land Council, and before that had worked for the federal government as well as in the private sector.

Past

- Silas Ngulati Roberts, the first chairman of the organisation serving in that role from its establishment in 1974 until c. 1982.
- Marion Scrymgour, former member of the Northern Territory Legislative Assembly and former CEO of the Tiwi Islands Regional Council, was CEO from March 2019 to July 2021. She was first female CEO at any NT land council.
- John Bugy Bugy Christophersen (c.1951–2021), who represented the Kakadu area within the West Arnhem region and was previously a longtime activist for Indigenous rights, died in April 2021, aged 69. He had been an organiser of the convoy that went to Sydney to join the 40,000-strong protest at the 1988 Bicentenary of Australia, and became the vice-president of the World Council of Indigenous Peoples in 1990. Offices closed as a mark of respect at his passing. He was also the biological father of athlete and politician Nova Peris, although she had no contact with him between the ages of 2 and 16.
- Kathy Mills OAM (c.1935 – 24 April 2022) was the first woman to be elected to the Northern Land Council.

== Land Rights News ==
Land Rights News is the longest-running Aboriginal newspaper.

In April 1976, the Central Land Council published the first edition of Central Australian Land Rights News, which ran until August 1984. In July 1976, the NLC launched Land Rights News: A Newsletter for Aboriginals and Their Friends. A major goal of these newspapers was not only to provide information to Aboriginal people on land rights issues, but also to correct misinformation, provide in-depth coverage of native title issues, and to challenge the stereotypes represented in mainstream newspapers in Australia, and to encourage its readers to take action.

In September 1985 the two land councils pooled their resources to start producing Land Rights News: One Mob, One Voice, One Land (LRN). In 1988, the newspaper won a UNAA Media Peace Award. At that time, the paper was under the editorship of NLC director John Ah Kit and CLC director Pat Dodson. In 1989, it won a print media award.

In 2002, Aboriginal journalist Todd Condie left the Koori Mail after ten years, to work on Land Rights News.

From 2011 and as of October 2022, Land Rights News is published three times a year in two editions: "Central Australia" and "Northern Edition", and remains the longest-running Aboriginal newspaper. It is also the only printed newspaper published in Central Australia.
