= Awarai =

The Awarai (Warray) are an indigenous Australian people of the Northern Territory.

== Language ==
The Norwegian explorer Knut Dahl wrote down a short list of vocabulary of the Awarai language.

== Country ==
The Awarai tribal lands took in some 1,400 square miles (3,600 km^{2}) of territory, between Mount Shoebridge and the Central Tableland. Their northern boundary was 46 miles south of Darwin, (Note: "Between some tribal areas there is a seemingly neutral zone or strip where members of more than one tribe may travel without the imputation of trespass. Parkhouse (1936:18) has drawn attention to one such belt between the Larakia tribe whose southern boundary ostensibly lies at Darwin River, 43 miles (74 km.) south of Darwin while the northern boundary of the Awarai horde of the Wulwulam is on a branch of the Finniss River 54 miles (86 km.) south of the same place." (Tindale 1974, p. 77)) on the Darwin River near the Adelaide–Darwin railway line and 10 miles north of Rum Jungle. The southern limits were at Brocks Creek, where their border met that of the Awinmul.

== Social organization ==
The Warai had arrangements to supply the Wogait with women for marriage.

== People ==
According to Norman Tindale, they stood in fear of the Agigondin horde of the Wulwulam, which however incorporated them eventually as a subtribe.

== Alternative names ==
- Awarrai, Awarra
- Warai, Warei, Warrai

Source: Tindale 1974, p. 221

== Some words ==
- nguk (1) tobacco (2) shit.

== Sources ==
- Dahl, Knut (1926). In Savage Australia: An Account of a Hunting and Collecting Expedition to Arnhem Land and Dampier Land (PDF). London: P. Allen & Sons.
- Eylmann, Erhard (1908). Die Eingeborenen der Kolonie Südaustralien (PDF). Berlin: D.Reimer.
- Mathews, R. H. (1901). "Ethnological notes on the aboriginal tribes of the Northern Territory". Queensland Geographical Journal. 16: 69–90.
- Parkhouse, T. A. (1895). "Native tongues in the neighbourhood of Port Darwin". Transactions of the Royal Society of South Australia. 19: 1–18.
- Spencer, Baldwin (1914). Native tribes of the Northern Territory of Australia (PDF). London: Macmillan Publishers.
- Tindale, Norman Barnett (1974). "Awarai (NT)". Aboriginal Tribes of Australia: Their Terrain, Environmental Controls, Distribution, Limits, and Proper Names. Australian National University. ISBN 978-0-708-10741-6. Archived from the original on 20 March 2020.
