= Kahlin Compound =

Kahlin Compound Darwin, Northern Territory
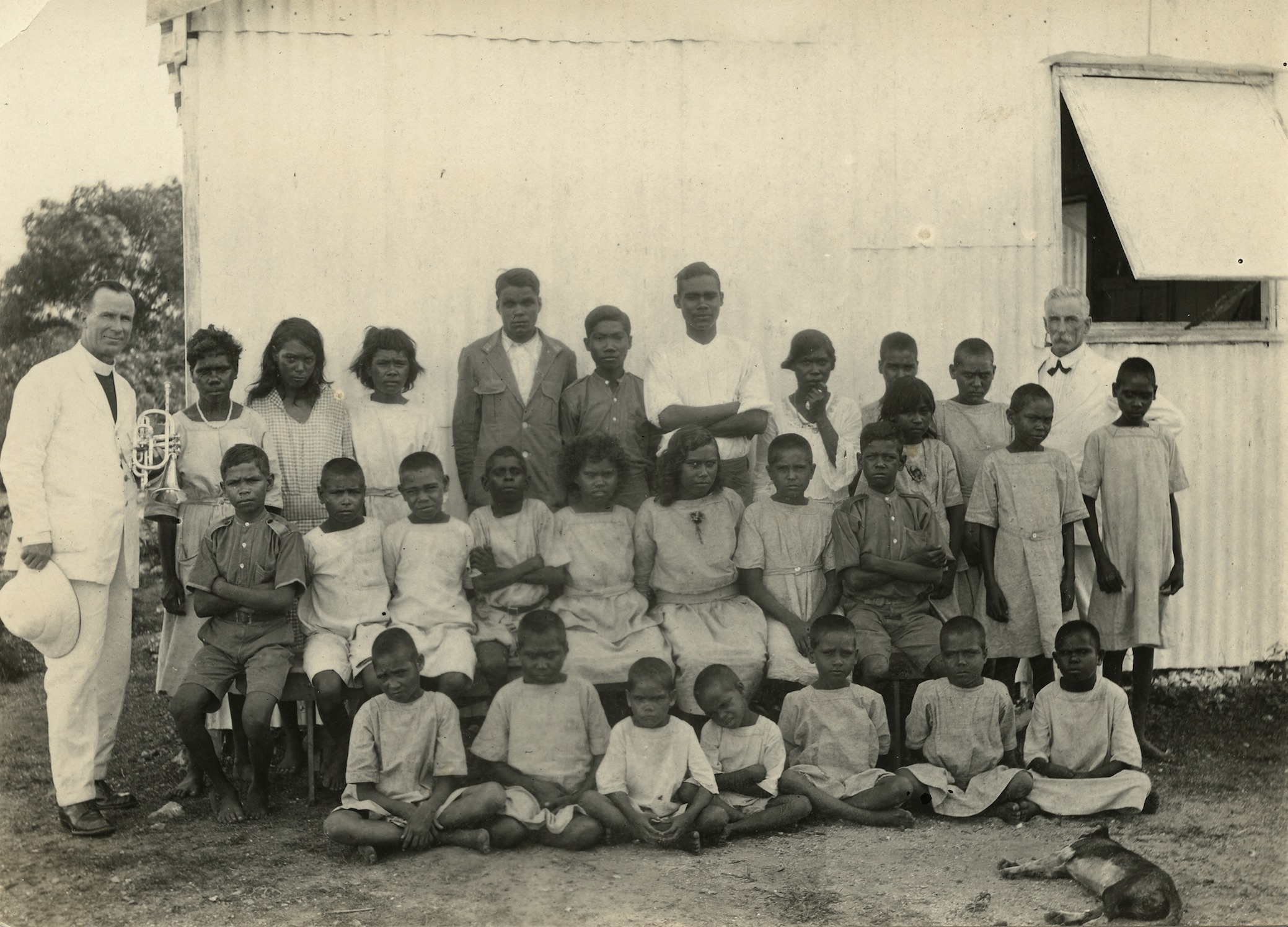
- Children at the Kahlin Compound in 1921

- Coordinates: 12°27′10″S 130°49′43″E
- LGA(s): City of Darwin
Localities around Kahlin Compound:
Mindil Beach	Kahlin Compound

Kahlin Compound was an institution for part-Aboriginal people in Darwin in the Northern Territory of Australia between 1913 and 1939. After 1924, "half-caste" children were separated from their parents and other adults and moved to an institution at Myilly Point.

== History ==
In 1913 the Northern Territory Protector of Aborigines, anthropologist Walter Baldwin Spencer decided to solve what he called the "half-caste problem" by rounding up hundreds of mixed race Aboriginal families and removing them from their homes. The Kahlin Compound and Half Caste Home was established on Lambell Terrace at Myilly Point, overlooking Mindil Beach in Darwin. Spencer envisaged that the compound would be self-sufficient, providing housing, schooling and domestic training for each Aboriginal family. The whole compound was to be fenced with access for Aboriginal people and Departmental officials only.

A 1923 Commonwealth parliamentary inquiry headed by the South Australian Senator John Newland included an investigation of conditions at the Compound. Newland recommended that it be moved to a site further from the town, but this did not happen (perhaps because the residents were a source of cheap labour).

A subsequent inquiry appointed by the NT Administrator also recommended the establishment of a new compound be established and also that "half-caste" children should be separated from adults, in a separate institution where they could be disciplined and integrated into the [white] community. The new "Half-Caste Home" was opened at Myilly Point in 1924, and most of the Kahlin children were moved there.

The compound was damaged in the 1937 cyclone.

In 1938, all residents were moved to the new Bagot Aboriginal Reserve. The Kahlin Compound closed in 1939 and was revoked as an Aboriginal Reserve on 3 July 1940.

== Re-use of site ==
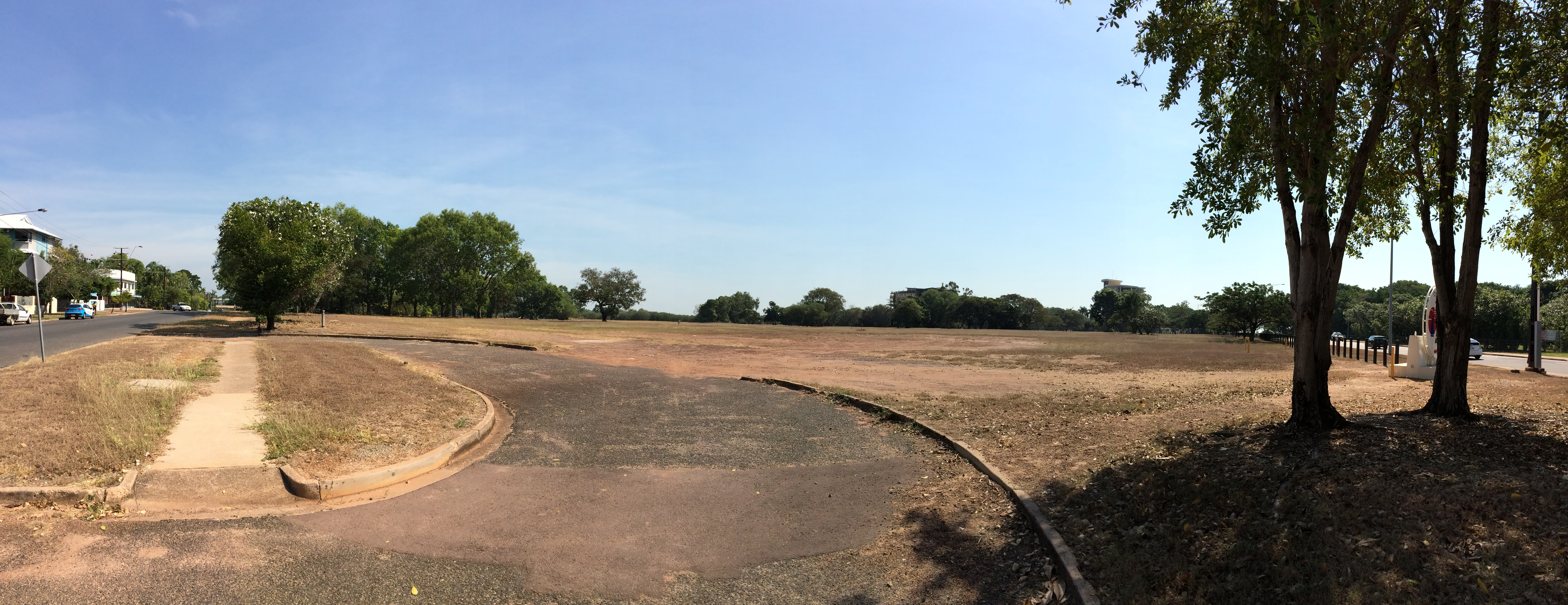
The Kahlin Compound site in 2016

The site was used as an emergency hospital during a meningitis outbreak in 1940, with patients housed in tents. It then became part of the permanent Darwin Hospital grounds from 1942 until the hospital was demolished in the 1990s.

An attempt made in 2003 to have the site listed on the Northern Territory Heritage Register as recognition of its cultural history was unsuccessful.

In February 2017, the Northern Territory Government announced that a new $50 million museum would be built on the site, recognising both the hospital and in particular, the significance of the Kahlin Compound as part of Territory's multicultural heritage. In October of that year, the site was found to be contaminated with asbestos, requiring additional remediation works. The expensive museum proposal proved unpopular with the community, and the plans were abandoned in 2018.

Removal of asbestos from the site was completed by 2021, with the area landscaped and opened as a public park including a large children's playground, skate park and basketball court.

== Commentary ==
The rounding up and deporting of Aboriginal people to such compounds across Australia has been described as a crime against humanity.

== Notable people ==
- Alngindabu; who was taken there in 1918 alongside two of her younger children:
  - Joe McGinness.
  - Val McGinness.
- Richard (Dick) Butler; the 'horse-boy' there who was taken there in the 1910s.
- Joseph (Joe) Croft; who was taken there in 1927.
- Alec Kruger; was taken there in 1928.
- Daisy Ruddick; who was taken there around 1920.
- Robert Tudawali; who went there with his family in the 1930s.

== See also ==
- Stolen generations
