= Marranunggu =

Aboriginal Australians in the Northern Territory

The Marranunggu are an Aboriginal Australian people and language group, of the Northern Territory.

== Language ==
Marranunggu is classified as one of the dialects of the Marranji group of the Western Daly languages, together with Menhthe and Emmi.

== Country ==
The Marranunggu's traditional lands were south of the Daly River.

According to Norman Tindale's calculations, the Marinunggo had roughly 250 square miles (650 km^{2}) of tribal territory around the area of the Dilke Range and running in a northeasterly direction towards the swamplands of the Daly River.

== Alternative names ==
- Marranunga
- Maranunggo
- Marranunngo
- Maranunga
- Maranungo

== Sources ==
- Basedow, Herbert (1907). "Anthropological notes on the Western Coastal tribes of the Northern Territory of South Australia". Journal of the Transactions of the Royal Society of South Australia. 31: 1–62.
- Dahl, Knut (1895). "Treatment after circumcision in the Hermit Hill tribe, Daly River, Northern Territory". Transactions of the Royal Society of South Australia. 19. Adelaide: 122–123.
- Dahl, Knut (1926). In Savage Australia: An Account of a Hunting and Collecting Expedition to Arnhem Land and Dampier Land (PDF). London: P. Allen & Sons. pp. 72–98.
- Ganter, Regina (2015). "German Missionaries in Australia: Daly River (1886-1899)". Griffith University.
- Grim, John A. (2006). "Indigenous Traditions: Religion and Ecology". In Gottlieb, Roger S. (ed.). The Oxford Handbook of Religion and Ecology. Oxford University Press. pp. 283–311. ISBN 978-0-199-72769-8.
- Marett, Allan; Barwick, Linda; Ford, Lysbeth (2013). For the Sake of a Song: Wangga Songmen and Their Repertories. Sydney University Press. ISBN 978-1-920-89975-2.
- Rose, Deborah Bird (2000). "Tropical Hundreds:monoculturalism and colonisation". In Docker, John; Fischer, Gerhard (eds.). Race, Colour and Identity in Australia and New Zealand. University of New South Wales Press. pp. 59–78. ISBN 978-0-868-40538-4.
- Stanner, W. E. H. (December 1933). "Ceremonial Economics of the Mulluk Mulluk and Madngella Tribes of the Daly River, North Australia. A Preliminary Paper". Oceania. 4 (2): 156–175. doi:10.1002/j.1834-4461.1933.tb00098.x. JSTOR 40327457.
- Sutton, Peter (2004). Native Title in Australia: An Ethnographic Perspective. Cambridge University Press. ISBN 978-1-139-44949-6.
- Thurman, Joanne (2014). "Cave Men Luminoids, and Dragons:Monstrous Creatures Mediating Relationships between People and Country in Aboriginal Northern Australia". In Musharbash, Yasmine; Presterudstuen, Geir Henning (eds.). Monster Anthropology in Australasia and Beyond. Springer. pp. 25–38. ISBN 978-1-137-44865-1.
- Tindale, Norman Barnett (1974). "Marinunggo (NT)". Aboriginal Tribes of Australia: Their Terrain, Environmental Controls, Distribution, Limits, and Proper Names. Australian National University. ISBN 978-0-708-10741-6.
