= Mount Fitch (Northern Territory) =

- Location in Australia
- Location: Rum Jungle, Northern Territory, Australia; 12°56′55″S 130°57′06″E
- Products: Uranium

Mount Fitch is a former uranium mining site located in the Northern Territory of Australia 56 kilometres SSE from the centre of Darwin and 13.4 kilometres NE from the town of Batchelor in the locality of Rum Jungle.

In 1950 two geologists, named Ward and Gates, discovered yellow secondary uranium minerals in limestone throughout the area. Radiometric contouring and geological mapping was completed later the same year.

Mount Fitch was discovered in 1965 and is part of the old Rum Jungle workings. Compass Resources worked in the area for many years and mostly focused on the Browns deposit, a copper-cobalt-nickel deposit close to the old open pit. In 2006 some 4050 tonnes Uranium Oxide deposits remained at Mt Fitch.

It is an ecologically sensitive area due to its very close proximity (1600 metres) to the catchment area of Darwin River, the river that is the source of Darwin's drinking water supply, Darwin River Dam.

Mount Fitch is located alongside the old Northern Railway corridor that ran from Pine Creek to Darwin.
