= North Australian Workers' Union =

Former trade union in the Northern Territory, Australia

The North Australian Workers' Union (NAWU) was a trade union in the Northern Territory between 1927 and 1972. It was a publisher of a newsletter in Darwin, the Northern Standard.

== History ==
The NAWU was formed in 1927 via the merger of the North Australian Industrial Union (which was formed by Harold George Nelson) and the Northern Territory Workers' Union. It identified as an "independent union" (distinguishing itself from a previous Northern Territory branch of the Australian Workers' Union) but did affiliate with the Australian Council of Trade Unions. The union's inaugural secretary was Robert Toupein, a former mayor of Darwin.

The union initially practised racial segregation, with membership barred to anyone "who is a Chinese, Japanese, Kanaka, or Afghan, or who belongs to any colored race". However, exemptions were made for Maori, African-American, and mixed-race workers. In 1930, Toupein and union organiser Owen Rowe represented the NAWU executive at a conference on Indigenous labour organised by home affairs minister Arthur Blakeley. While Toupein had previously criticised the exploitation of Indigenous workers, at the conference he argued that assimilation and wage equality were not possible for "full-blood" Indigenous people and that segregation should be introduced, whereby Indigenous people would be removed from pastoral stations and placed on reserves for their own "protection". The NAWU did agree that "half-caste" (racially mixed) Indigenous people should be granted equal wages in line with the eliminationist views advocated by Cecil Cook, to encourage their integration into white society.

By the late 1930s, the NAWU had accepted a number of half-caste Indigenous people as members. The union intervened on their behalf to participate in local society, including opposing moves to segregate the Northern Territory Football League and supporting their right to drink alcohol at public hotels. In 1937, the union intervened on the behalf of half-caste waterside workers, when Northern Territory administrator Aubrey Abbott argued before the local arbitration court that their wages should be lowered due to their racial status. The NAWU ultimately removed its racial bar in 1948 and allowed all Indigenous Australians to take up membership, despite the opposition of federal interior minister Herbert Johnson and departmental officials in the Native Affairs branch in Darwin.

The union was involved in Aboriginal Australians' working conditions on cattle stations in the 1960s. In 1965 the Union applied to the Commonwealth Conciliation and Arbitration Commission to amend the Northern Territory's pastoral award to remove sections discriminating against Aboriginal workers. The pastoralists resisted strongly; the Commission eventually agreed, but in consideration of the pastoralists' concerns of what it would cost them, delayed implementation by three years. This delay helped lead towards the Gurindji strike (Wave Hill walk-off).

The union was deregistered in 1972. Its waterside section became the Darwin branch of the Waterside Workers' Federation, while the rest of the union amalgamated into the Federated Miscellaneous Workers' Union.
