= Joe McGinness =

Aboriginal Australian activist (1914–2003)

Joseph Daniel McGinness
- Born: 2 July 1914; Lucy Claim, near Batchelor, Northern Territory, Australia
- Died: 11 July 2003 (aged 89); Cairns, Queensland, Australia
- Occupation: Aboriginal rights activist
- Known for: First Aboriginal president of FCAATSI
- Parent: Alngindabu (mother)

Joseph Daniel McGinness AM (1914–2003), known as "Uncle Joe", was an Aboriginal Australian activist and the first Aboriginal president of the Federal Council for the Advancement of Aborigines and Torres Strait Islanders (FCAATSI).

== Early life and family ==
Joseph Daniel McGinness was born on 2 July 1914 in the Northern Territory to Alngindabu (also known as Lucy), a Kungarakany woman, and Stephen McGinness, an Irish prospector and operator of a tin mine. McGinness was baptised in his father's Catholic faith. The McGinnesses had five children; Joe's brother Val McGinness would also be an activist as well as a musician and sportsman. His sister, Margaret Edwards, was active in the Council for Aboriginal Rights in Melbourne in the 1960s. Another brother, Jack McGinness, was also an activist, and the Northern Territory's and Australia's first elected Aboriginal union leader in 1955 as president of NAWU.

When their father died, McGinness, aged eight, and his siblings were taken into Kahlin Compound for "half-caste" children in Darwin.

== Career ==
McGinness served in Borneo in World War II, and upon his return worked on the docks in Cairns, when he was active in the Waterside Workers' Federation.

His experience in the union movement led him to political activism with the Cairns Aboriginal and Torres Strait Islander Advancement League, which he formed with Gladys O'Shane and Elia Ware, and later the Federal Council for Aboriginal Advancement. This later known as the Federal Council for the Advancement of Aborigines and Torres Strait Islanders (FCAATSI), of which he became first Aboriginal president in 1971. He remained president for all but one year until FCAATSI folded in 1978. He visited Adelaide, in South Australia, several times, to liaise with activists such as John Moriarty.

He worked on the campaign for the 1967 referendum regarding Aboriginal affairs in Australia.

He was later manager of Aboriginal Hostels Limited for the northern region.

He was also known as "Uncle Joe".

== Honours ==
McGinness was made a Member of the Order of Australia in the 1990 Australia Day Honours list for service to the Aboriginal community.

== Personal life and death ==
McGinness married Amy, a Torres Strait Islander woman.

He died on 11 July 2003, aged 89, in Cairns, Queensland.

== Publications ==
- Son of Alyandabu: My Fight for Aboriginal Rights (1991) – autobiography

== Works ==
- McGinness, Joe (1991). Son of Alyandabu: My fight for Aboriginal Rights. University of Queensland Press. ISBN 0702223352.
