= Eve Andree Laramee =

American installation artist

- Born: January 6, 1956 (age 70); Los Angeles, California, USA
- Known for: Sculpture, Installation art, San Francisco
- Movement: Environmental Art, Installation art

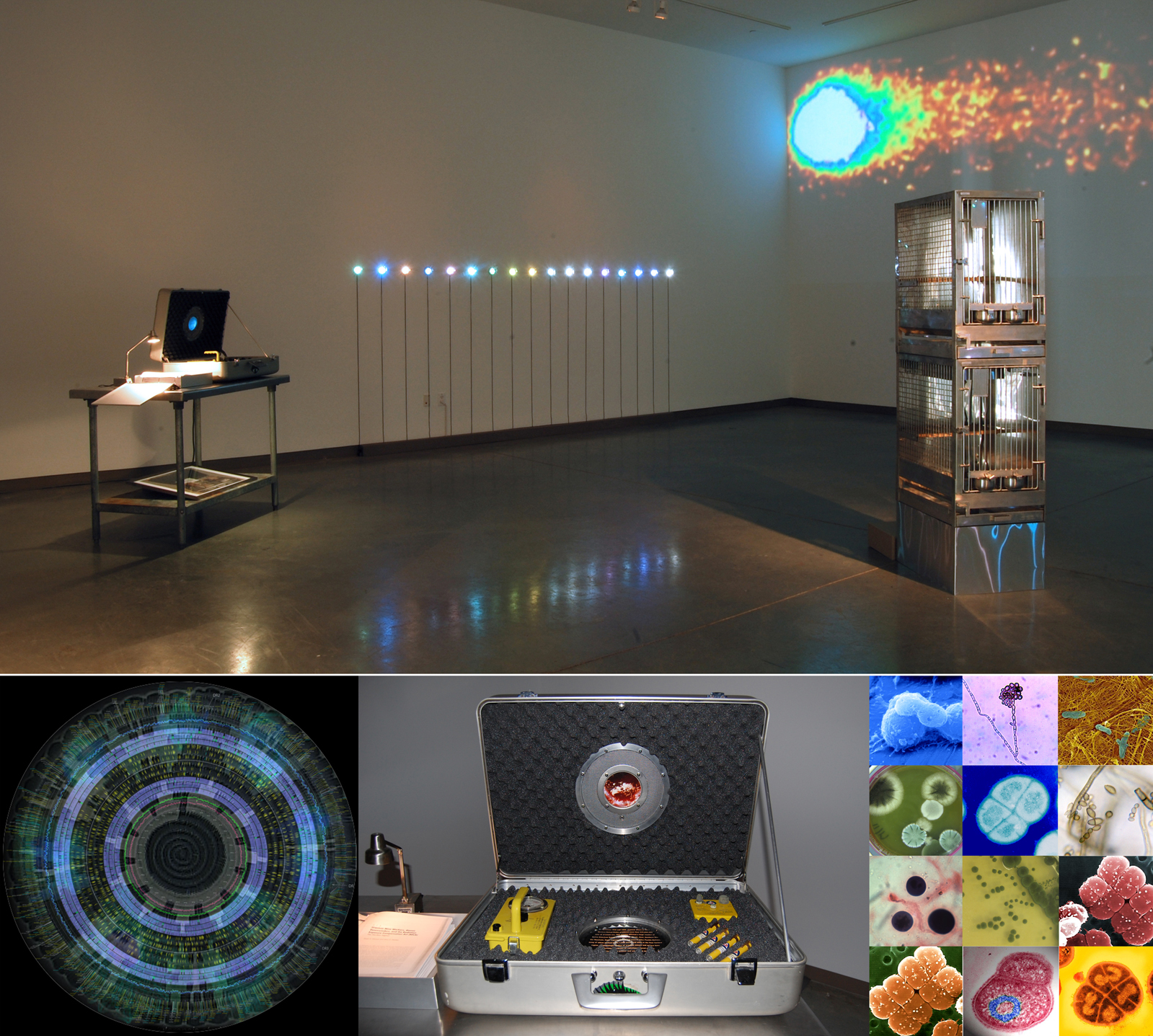
Halfway to Invisible, Eve Andree Laramee, 2009, Installation: kinetic sculpture, video, video projection, 60 lightboxes with transparencies, Cold War artifacts, archive of documents, photographs, ambient soundscape.

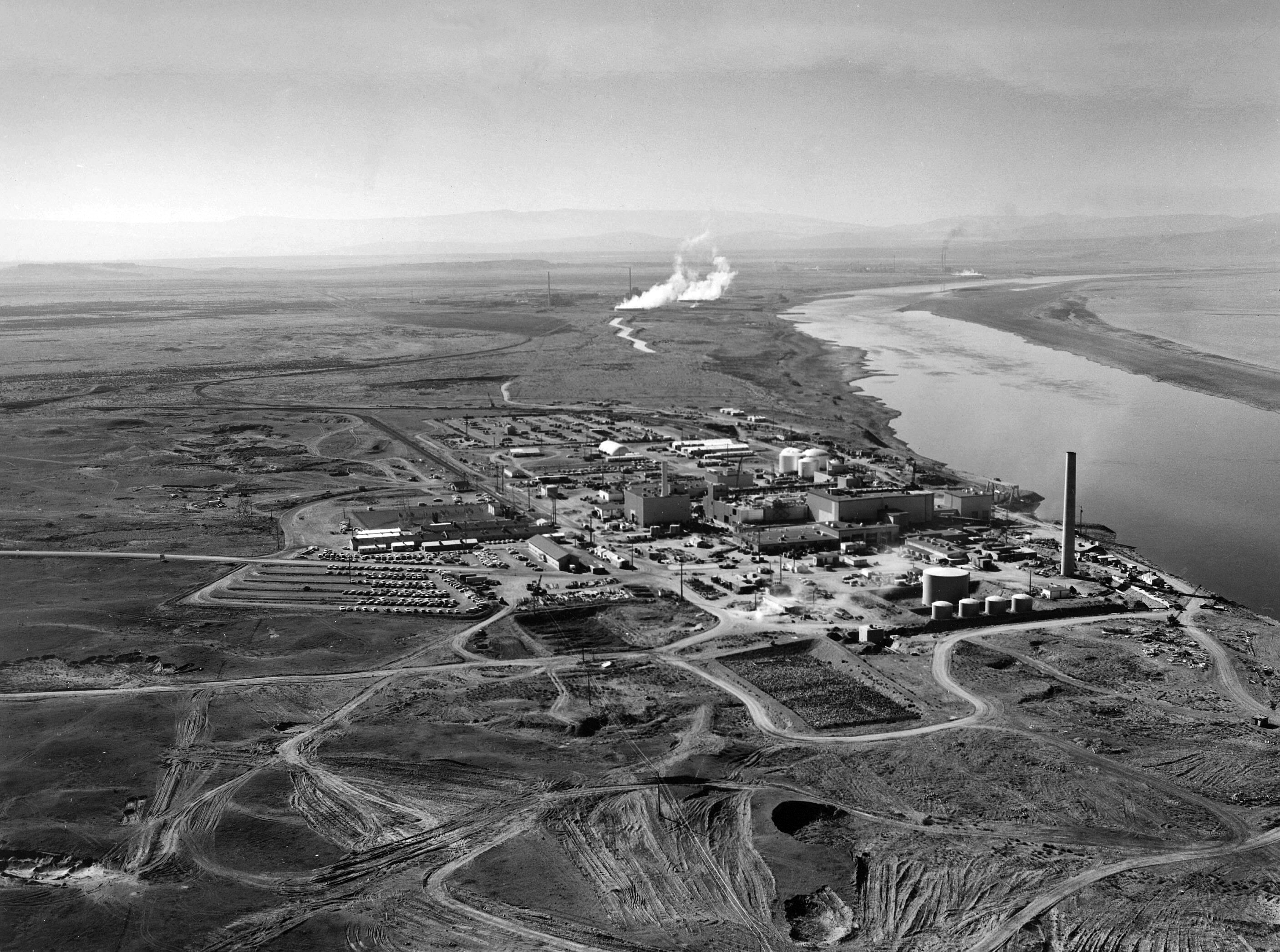
The Hanford site represents two-thirds of the nation's high-level radioactive waste by volume. Nuclear reactors line the riverbank at the Hanford Site along the Columbia River in January 1960.

Eve Andree Laramee is an American installation artist whose works explores four primary themes: legacy of the Atomic Age, history of science, environment and ecology, social conditions. Her interdisciplinary artworks operate at the confluence of art and science. Laramee currently lives in Brooklyn, New York, and Santa Fe, New Mexico. She is the founder and director of ART/MEDIA for a Nuclear Free Future. Laramee is Professor Emerita of Art at Pace University.

== Work summary ==
Laramee's interest in the history and culture of science has resulted in collaborations with physicists, hydrologists, geologists, biogeographers, and ecologists since the 1980s. Laramee believes that, "by sharing innovations, art-and-science collaborations can energize action to initiate positive social change and promote awareness of environmental and health issues by directly involving communities, extending ways in which cultures imagine, create and understand."

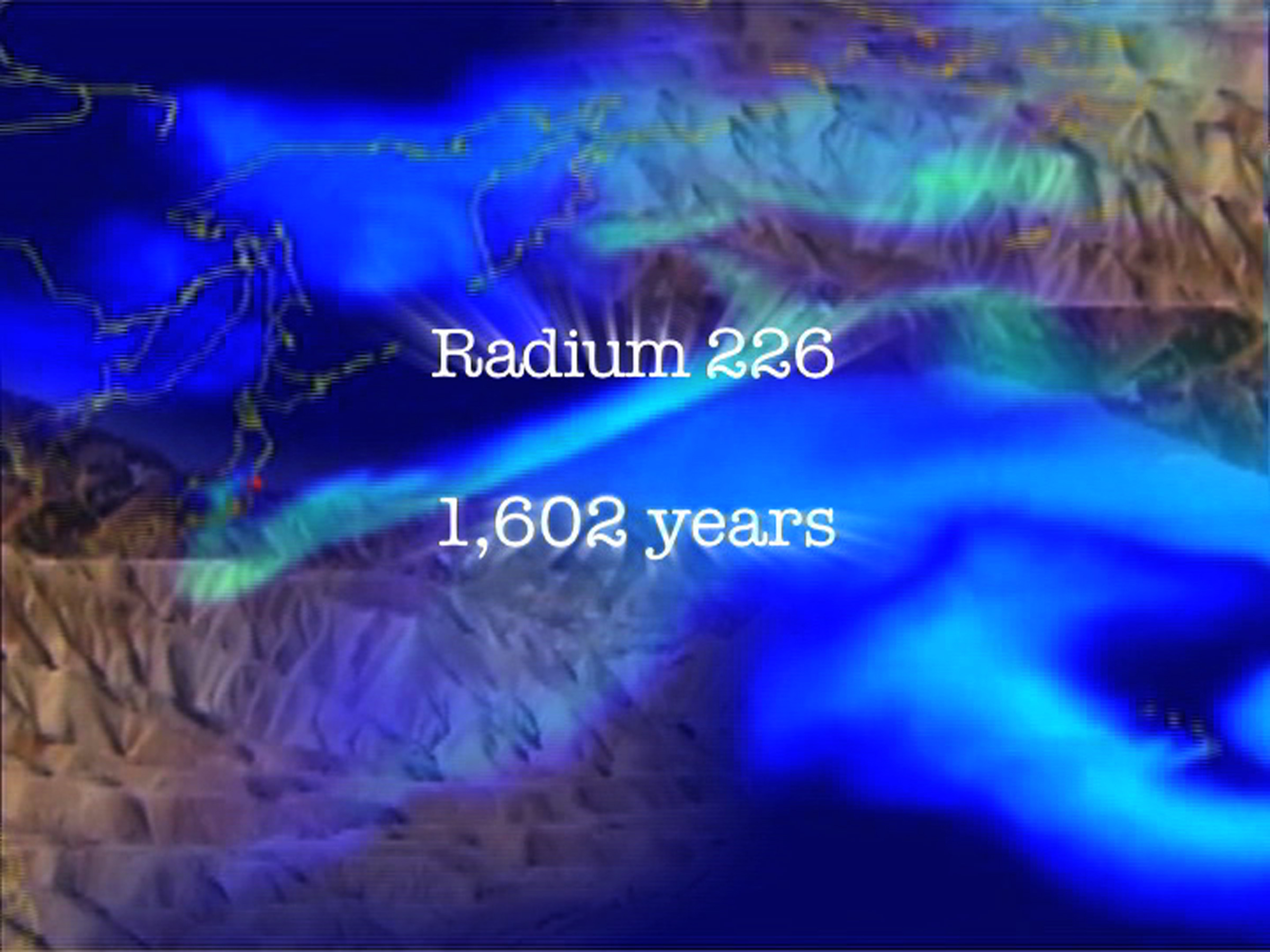
Uranium Decay, Eve Andree Laramee, video still. Six minute video (detail from installation, "Invisible Fire")Uranium Decay (2012), draws attention to the dark, inverse form of alchemy of the Atomic Age. Responding to the ongoing Fukushima meltdowns the video illuminates the 4.47 billion-year half-life decay cycle of uranium-238 superimposed onto thermographs and news footage. As uranium decays over geological time, it transmutes into “uranium daughters” that cascade into other elements and finally to stable Lead-206. As we are learning post-Fukushima, when climate change occurs and vulnerability spectrums shift, nuclear sites and the life forms surrounding them are at increased risk.

In her recent creative work, Laramee speculates on how human beings use and misuse the natural environment. Artworks that investigate the environmental and health impacts of atomic legacy sites track the invisible radioactive contamination, residues of the nuclear weapons complex and the nuclear energy industry. This multifaceted work cites uranium mining, milling, plutonium production that have resulted in the contamination of surface water, well water and deep aquifer water, soil and air pollution, social injustice, and the consequences upon forms of life. Her work on atomic legacy issues has been featured in the International Uranium Film Festival. Other forms of environmental degradation that she addresses are desertification, climate change, and dredging.

The aspects of the history of science that she explores include alchemy, subjectivity in scientific research, such legendary figures as Charles Darwin and Johannes Kepler. The environmental/ecological issues that appear in her work include commodification of nature, the political and cultural history of the national parks in the US, and the correlation between human blood and ocean water. Social conditions that she addresses include the impact of radioactive waste and weapons testing upon indigenous peoples in the American West.

Laramee's social-sculpture interventions activate community participation in environmental remediation efforts, encourage responsible behaviors, and invoke political critiques. She is currently the executive director of ART/MEDIA for a Nuclear Free Future, an offshoot from ART/MEDIA, a social sculpture founded in 1984 that supported public art works presented in the mass media and created by such invited artists as Jenny Holzer, Hans Haacke, Rachel Rosenthal, Terry Allen, and others. Their projects included artist-designed billboards, television, radio and print interventions, museum exhibitions, lectures, and performance art by disseminating political, environmental, and social activist art works to people who were not members of the traditional art audience.

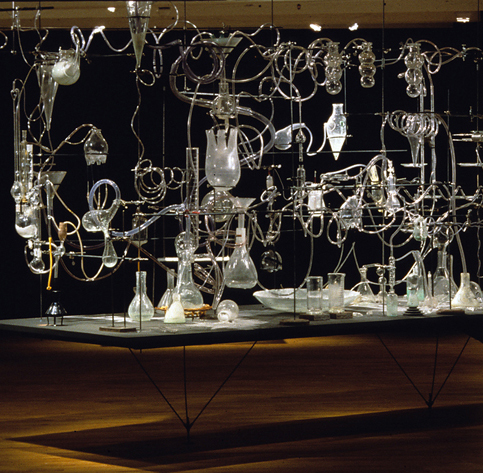
Apparatus for the Distillation of Vague Intuitions, installation by Eve Andree Laramee, as exhibited at MASSMoCA, North Adams, MA

== Major works ==
=== Apparatus for the Distillation of Vague Intuitions ===
Influenced by alchemy, this installation of hand blown glass vessels engraved with text refers to subjectivity, intuition, and guesswork in scientific inquiry. The art historian Ann Morris Reynolds describes this work as an "apparatus": a means by which a "distillation of vague intuitions" concerning art and science is performed. And true to the second meaning of the term, a political organization or an under ground political movement, Apparatus counters the business-as-usual experience of both. Science and art interrogate each other and the results are marvelous... and rare.

=== Halfway to Invisible ===
An installation comprising videos, kinetic sculpture, photography, and an archive of government documents, Halfway to the Invisible exposes the environmental legacy of uranium mining in the American Southwest. Between 1949 and 1980, these mines produced more than 225,000,000 tons of uranium ore. Epidemiological studies provide evidence of the effects upon the health of the predominantly Native American laborers and their families.

=== Slouching Towards Yucca Mountain ===
This photo and video installation is a post-atomic science fiction Western featuring twelve time travelers exploring the desert locations of the Yucca Mountain nuclear waste repository, the Nevada Test Site (NNSS), and Death Valley National Park.

=== Luminous Darwin: The Lost Notebooks of Charles Darwin ===
This installation of magic lantern styled video sculptures, faux historic devices, and didactic text referencing Darwin's late work on metaphysics. Laramee created three fictional notebooks she attributed to Darwin corresponding to the animal, vegetable, and mineral realms: "Notebook X: The Awareness of the Cells", "Notebook Y: The Dreams of the Plants", and "Notebook Z: The Memories of the Stones". This deviation from conventional scientific/historic exhibitions was installed within an actual historic exhibition, "Dialogues with Darwin" at the Museum of The American Philosophical Society, a repository for original Darwin materials.

=== SugarMud ===
This installation, installed in the drawing room of a Gilded Age mansion consisted of a room-sized mound of golden-colored sugar that referenced two local issues. One was the golden hue associated with the historic Hudson River School of painters and the accumulated toxic sediment from the sugar factory sludge located on the shore of the Hudson River. Collaborating with environmental scientists, Laramee created Sediment Profile Imagery using benthic disturbance mapping of the river bottom documenting the channels where 80,000 tons of sludge were dredged and relocated to the ocean floor.

== Exhibitions ==
Laramee's art has been exhibited throughout the United States, Europe, Asia and the Middle East. She has participated in exhibitions at the Venice Biennale, Mass MOCA, Massachusetts Institute of Technology (MIT), the Museum of Contemporary Art, Chicago; the New Museum of Contemporary Art, New York; the High Museum of Art, Atlanta; the Contemporary Arts Museum, Houston; among other institutions.

== Collections ==
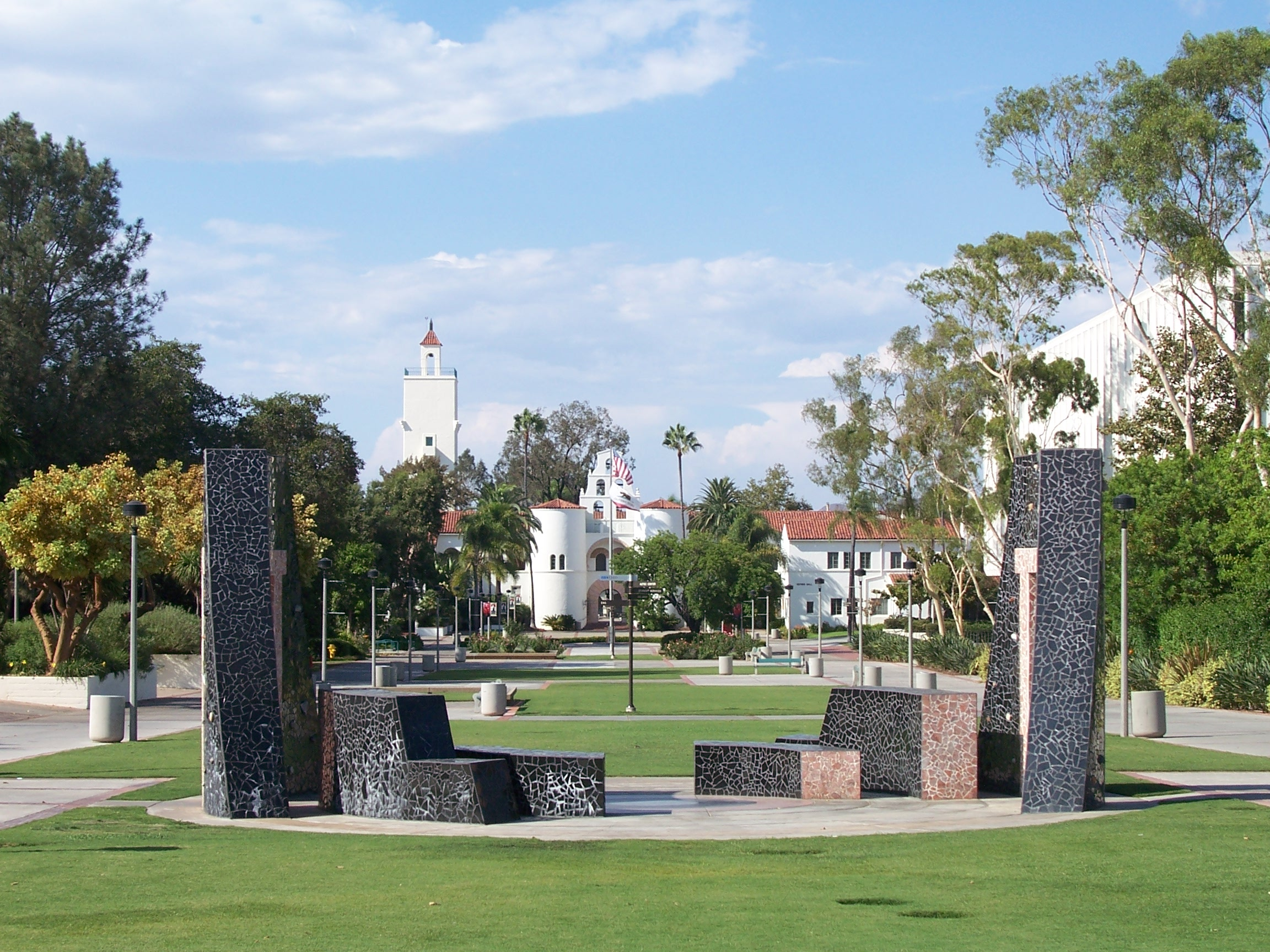
100 Years 100 Stones, public artwork by Eve Andree Laramee in the courtyard of SDSU

Laramee's work is included in the collections of the MacArthur Foundation, the Museum of Modern Art, New York, the Museum of Contemporary Art, Chicago, The Fogg Art Museum of Harvard University, Massachusetts Institute of Technology, the UCLA Armand Hammer Museum, and other public and private collections. Her public art sculpture, 100 Years 100 Stones commemorates the centennial year of San Diego State University.

== Grants and fellowships ==
Laramee has received two grants from the Pollock-Krasner Foundation, an Andy Warhol Foundation Grant, two fellowships from the New York Foundation for Arts and grants from the Mid-Atlantic States Arts Foundation, National Endowment for the Arts, and the Guggenheim Museum Sculptor-in-Residence Program. International Sculpture Center.

== See also ==
- Kate Brown (professor)
- Sandra Lahire
- The Plutonium Files
- Eileen Welsome
- Ruth Faden
- Nuclear Nebraska
- Plutonium in the environment
- History of the anti-nuclear movement
- List of films about nuclear issues
- List of Nuclear-Free Future Award recipients
- Uranium in the environment
- Uranium mining debate
- World Uranium Hearing
- International Uranium Film Festival
