= International Uranium Film Festival =

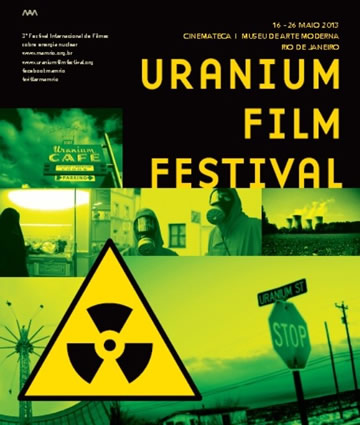
Montage of film stills from the Film Festival

The International Uranium Film Festival was founded in 2010 in Rio de Janeiro, and merges art, ecology, environmentalism and environmental justice, to inform the public about uranium mining and milling, nuclear power, nuclear weapons and the nuclear fuel cycle from "cradle to grave" life-cycle assessment, and the effects of radioactivity on humans and other species. The festival founders and principal organizers are Norbert Suchanek and Marcia Gomes de Oliveira. The legal organizer of the International Uranium Film Festival is the arts and education non-profit "Yellow Archives". The organizers and the festival participants seek to educate and activate the international public on these issues through the dynamic media of film and video.

== Film themes ==
The films shown typically have content that critiques and analyzes uranium mining, milling, and use, and the effects thereof on land, water and human health. A key objective of the festival is to inform cultures and future generations about the effects of radioactivity and radioactive materials. Other themes explore atomic legacy issues, including the research, development, testing and use of nuclear weapons. Many of these events affected specific populations including the Marshall Islanders, Native American cultures in the U.S. Southwest and Northwest, First Nations in Western Canada, among others.

== Locations ==
Following its establishment in Brazil, the festival has moved internationally and in 2024 included ten US and Canadian stops including a focus on Native lands which have been impacted by uranium and other mining. Other locations include Germany, Portugal, and India. and the United States.

== Organizers ==
The legal organizer of the International Uranium Film Festival is the arts and education non-profit Yellow Archives. Partners of the festival are the Heinrich Boell Foundation Brazil, Rio de Janeiro's Museum of Modern Art MAM-Rio and the Technical State School for TV, Cinema, Tourism and Events - Adolpho Bloch of the Foundation for Education and Science FAETEC.

== See also ==
- Hibakusha
- History of the anti-nuclear movement
- List of films about nuclear issues
- List of Nuclear-Free Future Award recipients
- The Navajo People and Uranium Mining
- The Return of Navajo Boy
- Uranium in the environment
- Uranium mining debate
- World Uranium Hearing
