= William and Katherine Estes Award =

- Description: Recognizes basic research in cognitive or behavioral science employing rigorous formal or empirical methods to advance understanding of problems relating to the risk of nuclear war
- Country: United States
- Presented by: National Academy of Sciences

The William and Katherine Estes Award, previously known as the NAS Award for Behavioral Research Relevant to the Prevention of Nuclear War is awarded by the US National Academy of Sciences "to recognize basic research in any field of cognitive or behavioral science that has employed rigorous formal or empirical methods, optimally a combination of these, to advance our understanding of problems or issues relating to the risk of nuclear war". It was first awarded in 1990.

== Recipients ==
Source: NAS

- 2019: No award was given
- 2020: No award was given
- 2021: Charles L. Glaser
- 2022: No award was given
- 2023: No award was given
- Etel Solingen (2018) - For providing the first systematic analysis in contemporary international relations connecting political economy, globalization, and nuclear choices on the one hand with domestic politics and nuclear behavior on the other. Her theoretical and empirical contributions have left an indelible impact on work within the academy and on broader public understanding of nuclear war.
- Scott D. Sagan (2015) - For his pioneering theoretical and empirical work addressing the risks of nuclear possession and deployment and the causes of nuclear proliferation.
- Robert Powell (2012) - For sophisticated game theoretic models of conflict that illuminate the heart of the strategic dilemmas of nuclear deterrence, including the importance of private information.
- Graham Allison (2009) - For illuminating alternative ways of thinking about political decision making with special relevance to crises, including nuclear crises, as demonstrated in his ground-breaking Essence of Decision and subsequent works.
- Robert Jervis (2006) - For showing, scientifically and in policy terms, how cognitive psychology, politically contextualized, can illuminate strategies for the avoidance of nuclear war.
- Walter Enders and Todd Sandler (2003) - For their joint work on transnational terrorism using game theory and time series analysis to document the cyclic and shifting nature of terrorist attacks in response to defensive counteractions.
- Philip E. Tetlock (2000) - For successfully developing a semantic measure of cognitive complexity predictive of foreign policy decisions and for applying psychological analysis and knowledge to nuclear policy problems.
- Alexander L. George (1997) - For combining theory with history to elucidate the requirements of deterrence, the limits to coercive diplomacy, and the relationship between force and statecraft.
- Thomas C. Schelling (1993) - For his pioneering work on the logic of military strategy, nuclear war, and arms races, which has profoundly influenced our understanding of this crucial subject.
- Robert Axelrod (1990) - For his imaginative use of game theory, experimentation, and computer simulation to define and test strategies for confrontation and cooperation and other models of social interaction.

== See also ==
- List of Nuclear-Free Future Award recipients
- Non-nuclear future
- Nuclear Free World Policy
- World Uranium Hearing
- Anti-nuclear movement
- Nuclear disarmament
- List of social sciences awards
