= JoAnn Tall =

- Known for: Anti nuclear activism
- Awards: Goldman Environmental Prize

JoAnn Tall is an environmental activist of the Oglala Lakota tribe who has worked to ensure the people have a chance to approve major projects for energy development. She was awarded the Goldman Environmental Prize in 1993 for her protests against uranium mining and plans for testing nuclear weapons in the Black Hills area, near the Pine Ridge Indian Reservation where she lives.

Tall was involved with the Black Hills Alliance in the 1970s, a group consisting of locals and environmentalists who investigated and tracked the records of uranium companies looking to mine in the region. The activists worked to ensure that any energy development projects proposed for the region would need to be approved by the voters rather than being automatically approved by the State.

Tall is an original board member for KILI, the local radio station for Pine Ridge Reservation. In August 1992, the station was protested for several months by local Oglala Lakota tribe members who believed that their freedom of speech and traditions were being suppressed by the white manager of the station.

In 1989 Tall co-founded the Native Resource Coalition in order to help educate the Lakota regarding health and environmental issues.

== Personal life ==
Tall and her husband Mark Tilsen have eight children.

== See also ==
- Janet McCloud
- Uranium in the environment
- Anti-nuclear movement in the United States
- The Navajo People and Uranium Mining
- Manuel Pino
- Uranium mining debate
- Thomas Banyacya
