= Lisa Camillo =

Australian–Italian filmmaker, writer

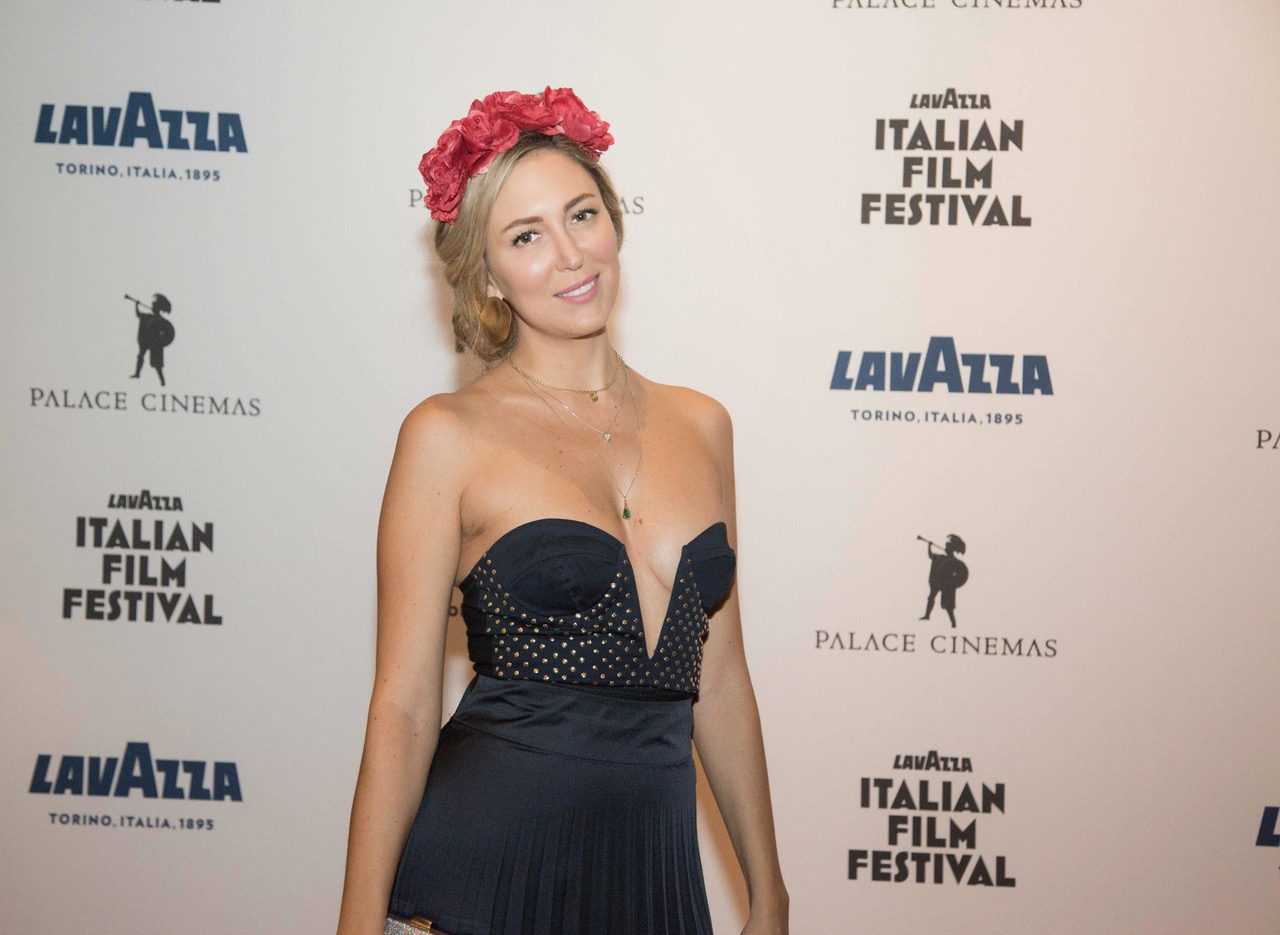
Camillo at the 2018 Italian Film Festival

Lisa Camillo is an Italian-Australian filmmaker, producer and writer. She is known for writing, producing and directing Balentes – The Brave Ones, Italy's Covid Hotline and The Sardinian Factory of Death. Her publications include Una Ferita Italiana (An Italian Wound).

== Education ==
Camillo started her studies with a degree in criminology in 2000, at RMIT University, Melbourne. She then completed a postgraduate degree in anthropology at Melbourne University and in 2010 she received a MA in International development and Humanitarian aid at the same university.

== Career ==
After graduating, she worked in Aboriginal communities with the Ministry of Health of New South Wales.

She later studied at Sydney Film School. In 2018, her documentary Balentes – The Brave Ones was released. The documentary featured in Lavazza Italian Film Festival (2018), Chelsea Film Festival (2020), Newcastle Italian Film Festival (2019), Italian Film Festival USA (2019), Life After Oil Film Festival (2019) and Uranium International Film Festival Berlin (2020).

Her book Una Ferita Italiana (An Italian Wound) was published in 2019 and is based on the documentary. She also participated in writing a book on domestic violence Postcards from Tomorrow: A Collection of Letters.

In 2019, she was invited to speak at the Italian Parliament to discuss with the Ministry of defence and Health some of the issues that were raised by her documentary to better Sardinia's situation.

In January 2020, Camillo received the title of Honorary Member from the A.N.V.U.I. – National Association of Victims of Depleted Uranium, for her fight against NATO with her film and book.

In 2020, Camillo worked with Aljazeera to create a documentary on a COVID-19 story in Milan, Italy, called Italy's Covid Hotline.

In 2021, her research on the use of depleted uranium by NATO in wars and in Sardinian military basis was submitted as evidence for the Teulada's court cases against Italian military generals.

In 2025, Camillo directed the short documentary Il grande inganno verde, which examines proposed offshore wind farms in the waters off Gallura, Sardinia, and the concerns raised by local communities regarding their potential environmental and economic impact. The film was made in collaboration with the Coordinamento Gallura contro la speculazione eolica e fotovoltaica. It was covered by regional media outlets including L’Unione Sarda and Radiolina, which also interviewed Camillo about the documentary.

Camillo is the producer and host of Are We F..ed?, a podcast produced by her company Against The Tide Films. The series features interviews with scientists, economists and other experts discussing climate change, environmental issues and possible future scenarios.

== Publications ==
- Una Ferita Italiana (An Italian Wound) – 2019 published by Ponte Alle Grazie
- Postcards from Tomorrow: A Collection of Letters - 2020 published by Kim Chandler McDonald

== Filmography ==
Year	Title	Credited as				Awards
Year	Title	Director	Writer	Producer	Cinematographer	Awards
2013	Live Through This	Yes	No	Yes	Yes	Courage Curiosity Compassion Documentary Award and Film Ink Best Music Award from Australian Guild of Screen Composers 1st Class Award at The "Tech-ex Cup" Awards Ceremony at Zhejiang University of Media and Communications
2015	Boneshaker	Yes	Yes	No	Yes	Finalist in the 44th CMAA Country Music Video Clip Awards of Australia
2016	Requiem	Yes	Yes	Yes	Yes	
2018	Balentes – The Brave Ones	Yes	Yes	Yes	No	Winner of Best Human Rights Documentary Feature at Life After Oil International Film Festival, 2019 Winner of Best Feature Documentary at the International Uranium Film Festival, Berlin, 2020 Winner of Award of Merit at Impact Docs Awards, 2020
2020	Italy Covid Hotline	Yes	Yes	Yes	Yes	
2020	Witness	No	No	Yes	No	
2022	The Sardinian Factory of Death	Yes	Yes	Yes	Yes	
2025	Il grande inganno verde	Yes	Yes	Yes	Yes	
