= Struggle for the Land =

1993 book by Ward Churchill

Struggle for the Land: Native North American Resistance to Genocide, Ecocide and Colonization
- Author: Ward Churchill
- Publisher: Common Courage Press
- Publication date: 1993

Struggle for the Land: Native North American Resistance to Genocide, Ecocide and Colonization is a book by Ward Churchill. It is a collection of essays on the efforts of Native Americans in the United States and in Canada to maintain their land tenure claims against government and corporate infringement. Equating colonization with genocide and ecocide, the author provides examples of resistance.

Beginning with an overview of the impact of legal doctrines established by the United States and Canada on Native people, and moving on to explore a series of case studies indicative of the effects of domination "by North America's settler-states," the book concludes with a discussion paper offering a scenario for an alternate future.

== Publishing information ==
It was first published with the subtitle Indigenous Resistance to Genocide, Ecocide and Expropriation in Contemporary North America by Common Courage Press in 1993 (hardcover: ISBN 1-56751-001-9, paperback: ISBN 1-56751-000-0). In 1999, it was resubtitled and released in a revised and expanded edition by Arbeiter Ring Publishing (Winnipeg, ISBN 1-894037-04-9). City Lights Publishers (San Francisco) published it in 2002 as a 460-page hardcover (ISBN 0-87286-415-4) and paperback (ISBN 0-87286-414-6).

== Synopsis ==
As its foreword, the book features a poem by Jimmie Durham. The preface is by Winona LaDuke and poems from John Trudell's Living in Reality appear as preludes to each section. Russell Means' 1982 platform for president of the Oglala people is included as an appendix. Maps of Indian land claims/treaty areas are included. The book is dedicated "for my mother."

The collected essays, mostly previously published, provide a history of Native American struggle for decolonization provided through the examples of the Haudenosaunee in upstate New York, the Lakotas on the northern Plains, the Lubicon Cree in northern Alberta, and the Navajo and Newe (Western Shoshone) in the upper Sonoran. The case is made that uranium mining, coal stripping, hydropower generation, and water diversion are ecocidal as well as genocidal, and that the ecological damage poses a threat to all North Americans.

Churchill also discusses the Native North American diaspora caused by their displacement.

"Not only the people of the land are being destroyed, but, more and more, the land itself. The nature of native resistance to the continued onslaught of the invading industrial culture is shaped accordingly. It is a resistance forged in the crucible of a struggle for survival." —from the introduction

== Awards ==
The book won the Gustavus Myers Award for Literature on Human Rights.

== Contents (to the revised edition) ==
Foreword by Jimmie Durham

- Buying Time

Preface by Winona LaDuke

- Succeeding into Native North America

A Secessionist View

Introduction by Ward Churchill

- The Indigenous Peoples of North America

A Struggle Against Internal Colonialism

Part I: The Law

- The Tragedy and the Travesty

The Subversion of Indigenous Sovereignty in North America

Part II: The Land

- Struggle to Regain a Stolen Homeland

Iroquois Land Rights in Upstate New York

- The Black Hills Are Not For Sale

The Lakota Struggle for the 1868 Treaty Territory

- Genocide in Arizona

The "Navajo-Hopi Land Dispute" in Perspective

- The Struggle for Newe Segobia

The Western Shoshone Battle for Their Homeland

- Last Stand at Lubicon Lake

Genocide and Ecocide in the Canadian North

Part III: Other Fronts

- Geographies of Sacrifice

The Radioactive Colonization of Native North America

- The Water Plot

Hydrological Rape in Northern Canada

- Like Sand in the Wind

The Making of an American Indian Diaspora in the United States

Part IV: An Alternative

- I Am Indigenist

Notes on the Ideology of the Fourth World

- Appendix by Russell Means and Ward Churchill
- TREATY

The Platform of Russell Means' Campaign for President of the Oglala People, 1982

- Index

== See also ==
- The Navajo People and Uranium Mining
- World Uranium Hearing
- Church Rock uranium mill spill
