= Susan Boos =

Swiss journalist and publicist (born 1963)

- Born: 1963 (age 61–62); Zürich, Switzerland
- Education: University of Zurich (1989)
- Occupation: Editor-in-chief of WOZ Die Wochenzeitung

Susan Boos (born 1963, Zurich, Switzerland) is a Swiss journalist and publicist. Since 2005, she is the editor-in-chief of WOZ Die Wochenzeitung. Since 2021 she has been the president of the Swiss Press Council.

== Life ==
Boos grew up in St. Gallen and completed a training as a teacher at the seminar Rorschach in the canton of St. Gallen. From 1984 to 1991, she worked for the Eastern Swiss Workers' Newspaper (AZ) in St. Gallen, in 1989 as an editor. At the same time, she studied ethnology, political science and journalism at the University of Zurich. In 1991, she moved to the Zurich WOZ Die Wochenzeitung, where she was editor-in-chief from 2005 to 2017. Boos is a jury member of the "Zürcher Journalistenpreis" (Zurich Journalists Prize). She publishes intensively on nuclear and energy policy. In 2021 she succeeded Dominique von Burg as the president of the Swiss Press Council.

In April 2021, following two difficult years during the pandemic, the president of the Foundation Council, the body in charge of financing for the Press Council, pledged their support for Boos' significant and solid ideas for the Press Council, for which they would ensure funding.

In June 2022, having received funding up to 2023, Boos pointed out that since 2017, the Press Council had handled more than double the amount of complaints it was equipped for, settling a record number of 197 complaints in 2021. In November 2022, Boos reported a lasting and consistent increase of untenable complaints which only expressed the disapproval to an article's content or simply wanted to lash out against an unwanted medium by filing a complaint.

In December 2022, Boos countered Markus Somm's criticism that the Press Council was superfluous, concluding that his rejection of the Press Council was likely based on his being exposed for failing to ensure effective quality control for the materials published and journalists working under him as editor-in-chief.

== Awards ==
- 2005: "Alstom Journalistenpreis" (Alstom Journalist Award) of the energy and transport company Alstom (for several articles in the weekly WOZ)
- 2012: Honorary Award of the Nuclear-Free Future Award in the category "Special Recognition" of the Franz Moll Foundation

== Writings (selection) ==
- "Beherrschtes Entsetzen. Das Leben in der Ukraine zehn Jahre nach Tschernobyl" (Controlled horror. Life in Ukraine ten years after Chernobyl) WOZ, Rotpunktverlag, Zurich 1996, ISBN 3-85869-162-3.
- "Strahlende Schweiz. Handbuch zur Atomwirtschaft" (Radiant Switzerland. Handbook for the nuclear industry) WOZ, Rotpunktverlag, Zurich 1999, ISBN 3-85869-167-4.
- "Sanktgaller Spitzen : sechs Reportagen aus dem Osten" (Sankt Gallen peaks. [Six reports from the East.) Appenzeller publishing house, Herisau 2003, ISBN 3-85882-352-X.
- "Fukushima lässt grüßen. Die Folgen eines Super-GAUs." (Fukushima sends greetings. The consequences of a super-GAUs.) Rotpunktverlag, Zurich 2012, ISBN 3-85869-474-6.
