= Alexander L. George =

American behavioral scientist (1920–2006)

Alexander George
- Born: Alexander Givargis; May 31, 1920; Chicago, Illinois, U.S.
- Died: August 16, 2006 (aged 86); Seattle, Washington, U.S.
- Education: University of Chicago (BA, MA, PhD)
- Spouse: Juliette George
- Children: 2
- Awards: 1975 Bancroft Prize; 1983 MacArthur Foundation Fellowship; 1997 NAS Award for Behavior Research Relevant to the Prevention of Nuclear War; 1998 Johan Skytte Prize in Political Science
- Scientific career
- Fields: International relations, foreign policy, behavioural science and political psychology.
- Workplaces: Stanford University; RAND Corporation; American University

Alexander L. George (May 31, 1920 Chicago – August 16, 2006 Seattle) was an American behavioral scientist. He was the Graham H. Stuart Professor of Political Science Emeritus at Stanford University. He made influential contributions to political psychology, international relations, and social science methodology.

== Life ==
His parents were Assyrians from Urmia in north-west Persia. He earned undergraduate and graduate degrees at the University of Chicago, where he received his doctorate in political science in 1958.

George appropriated the term process tracing from psychology in 1979 to describe the use of evidence from within case studies to make inferences about historical explanations.

According to David A. Hamburg he was among the first to lead behavioral scientists into studying the "very painful and dangerous" issues of nuclear crisis management during the Cold War era and to carry knowledge directly to policy leaders. George "focused a great deal of attention on reducing nuclear danger," he added. "I regard him as a truly great scholar and human being."

== Awards ==
- 1975 Bancroft Prize
- 1983 MacArthur Foundation Fellowship
- 1997 NAS Award for Behavior Research Relevant to the Prevention of Nuclear War from the National Academy of Sciences.
- 1998 Johan Skytte Prize in Political Science
- 2000 membership to the American Philosophical Society

== Works ==
- Alexander L. George; Juliette L. George (1964). Woodrow Wilson and Colonel House: a personality study. Courier Dover Publications. ISBN 978-0-486-21144-2. "Alexander L George."
- The Chinese Communist Army in Action; The Korean War and Its Aftermath. Columbia University Press. 1969. ISBN 978-0-231-08595-3.
- Alexander L. George; Richard Smoke (1974). Deterrence in American Foreign Policy: Theory and Practice. Columbia University Press. ISBN 978-0-231-03838-6. "Richard Smoke."
- Managing U.S.-Soviet Rivalry: Problems of Crisis Prevention. Westview Press. 1983. ISBN 978-0-86531-500-6.
- Alexander L. George; Philip J. Farley; Alexander Dallin, eds. (1988). U.S.-Soviet security cooperation: achievements, failures, lessons. Oxford University Press. ISBN 978-0-19-505398-2.
- Alexander L. George; Yaacov Bar-Siman-Tov, eds. (1991). Avoiding war: problems of crisis management. Westview Press. ISBN 978-0-8133-1232-3.
- Forceful persuasion: coercive diplomacy as an alternative to war. United States Institute of Peace Press. 1991. ISBN 978-1-878379-14-6.
- Alexander L. George; Juliette L. George (1998). Presidential personality and performance. Westview Press. ISBN 978-0-8133-2591-0.
- Alexander L. George; Andrew Bennett (2005). Case studies and theory development in the social sciences. MIT Press. ISBN 978-0-262-57222-4.
- On Foreign Policy: Unfinished Business. Paradigm Publishers. 2006. ISBN 978-1-59451-264-3.
- George, Alexander/Simons William E., 1994: The Limits of Coercive Diplomacy, Colorado/Oxford: Westview Press
