= Walter Enders =

Walter Enders is a time series econometrician. He serves as the Bidgood Chair of Economics and Finance (Emeritus) at the University of Alabama.

== Research ==
His research has covered a range of topics, most notably on the econometrics of terrorism. He wrote an important econometrics textbook, Applied Econometric Time Series, published in 1995. As of 2015 it was in its 4th edition.

Jointly with Todd Sandler Enders was awarded the William and Katherine Estes Award (US National Academy of Sciences) for Behavioral Research Relevant to the Prevention of Nuclear War. Specifically "For their joint work on transnational terrorism using game theory and time series analysis to document the cyclic and shifting nature of terrorist attacks in response to defensive counteractions".

== Selected publications ==
- Enders, Walter, and Clive Granger.(1988) "Unit-root tests and asymmetric adjustment with an example using the term structure of interest rates." Journal of Business & Economic Statistics 16, no. 3: 304-311.
- Enders, Walter, Todd Sandler, and Khusrav Gaibulloev. (2011) "Domestic versus transnational terrorism: Data, decomposition, and dynamics." Journal of Peace Research 48, no. 3: 319-337.
- Enders, Walter, and Todd Sandler. (2002) "Patterns of transnational terrorism, 1970–1999: Alternative time-series estimates." International Studies Quarterly 46, no. 2: 145-165.
