= Nuclear Free World Policy =

The Nuclear Free World Policy is a commitment by a bloc of countries known as the New Agenda Coalition (NAC) to shape foreign policy around the goal of "the elimination of nuclear weapons and assurance that they will never be produced again." The policy arose from an 18-point Joint Declaration signed by the Ministers of foreign affairs of Brazil, Egypt, Ireland, Mexico, New Zealand, South Africa, Slovenia and Sweden on June 9, 1998. The signatories of this Joint Declaration became member-states of the NAC, although Slovenia and Sweden subsequently left the Coalition.

The key reason for countries that signed the Nuclear Free World Policy:

1. We, the Ministers for Foreign Affairs of Brazil, Egypt, Ireland, Mexico, New Zealand, Slovenia, South Africa and Sweden have considered the continued threat to humanity represented by the perspective of the indefinite possession of nuclear weapons by the nuclear-weapon states as well as by those three nuclear-weapons-capable states that have not acceded to the Nuclear Non-Proliferation Treaty, and the attendant possibility of use or threat of use of nuclear weapons. The seriousness of this predicament has been further underscored by the recent nuclear tests conducted by India and Pakistan.

These countries are weary of nuclear weapons’ deployment above everything else. Although 8 states are exempted from ban on nuclear weapons, 5 nations retain a de jure status of a “Nuclear Weapon State.” These states are the United States of America, the United Kingdom, France, Russia, and the People’s Republic of China —all of whom had already tested nuclear weapons before the NPT was signed. NWS’s right to possess a nuclear arsenal is countered by Article VI of the treaty, which says that they have a legal obligation to eventually disarm. They also criticized NWS countries for failing to meet their obligation to disarm, in addition to criticizing the 3 states non-signatory nuclear weapons-capable states (which are considered de facto nuclear weapons states). This was stated in point 4 of the Joint Declaration of 1998:

4. We can no longer remain complacent at the reluctance of the nuclear-weapon states and the three nuclear-weapons-capable states to take that fundamental and requisite step, namely a clear commitment to the speedy, final and total elimination of their nuclear weapons and nuclear weapons capability and we urge them to take that step now.

The NAC re-iterated the criticism from its Joint Declaration of de jure nuclear-weapon states’ repeated obduracy and attempts to avoid fulfilling their Treaty obligations to eventually disarm in an address given by Irish Foreign Minister David Andrews on the occasion of the Joint Ministerial Statement.

New Zealand's stand on nuclear issues was a step on the way towards the Nuclear Free World Policy. The New Zealand Nuclear Free Zone, Disarmament, and Arms Control Act of 1987 is seen as an embodiment of the nuclear-free world policy at the national level. Its specific goal is "to establish in New Zealand a Nuclear Free Zone, to promote and encourage an active and effective contribution by New Zealand to the essential process of disarmament and international arms control".

== See also ==
- Anti-nuclear movement
- Nuclear-Free Future Award
- Nuclear disarmament
- Non-nuclear future
- World Uranium Hearing
