= WOZ Die Wochenzeitung =

Swiss German-language weekly newspaper, published in Zürich

- Type: Weekly newspaper
- Owner(s): infolink cooperative, employees of the newspaper
- Editor-in-chief: Editorial conference / Editorial board: Renato Beck, Daniela Janser, Florian Keller
- Staff writers: Susan Boos, Cigdem Akyol
- Founded: 1981 as Die WochenZeitung (WoZ)
- Political alignment: Left-wing, Green socialism
- Language: German
- City: Zürich
- Country: Switzerland
- Circulation: 19,359 (as of 2026)
- Website: www.woz.ch

WOZ Die Wochenzeitung, commonly abbreviated as WOZ or Wochenzeitung, is a Swiss, German-language weekly newspaper published in Zürich.

== History ==
Die WochenZeitung (WoZ) first appeared on 1 October 1981. It cost 2 Swiss francs and 20,000 issues were printed. It was based on the experiences of the German Die Tageszeitung (Taz) and the Zürich-based monthly student magazine Das Konzept. Its creation was influenced by events of the Swiss alternative political movement in the first phase of the youth movement of the 1980s. Well-known journalists like Niklaus Meienberg or Laure Wyss but also novelists such as Max Frisch and Otto F. Walter regularly wrote for the paper. In 1987 WOZ started using gender-neutral language.

Since 1995, both WOZ and Taz add a German-language edition of Le Monde diplomatique as a supplement to the newspaper. Most of the articles of the German Le Monde diplomatique are translations from articles originally written for the French edition.

Since the beginning, all employees have been remunerated according to the principle of equality: A uniform wage, currently 6000 Swiss Francs, is being paid. The low proportion of advertisements granted the newspaper a certain independence, but the newspaper was periodically under-funded. Following a reboot in 2003, the newspaper nearly went bankrupt due to increased costs, but a reorganization in 2005, which included changing the whole original editorial board and making the decision to not have a chief editor, ultimately allowed the publication to continue. In recent years the readership has been growing steadily and the paper has achieved financial stability and raised wages.

== Organization and profile ==
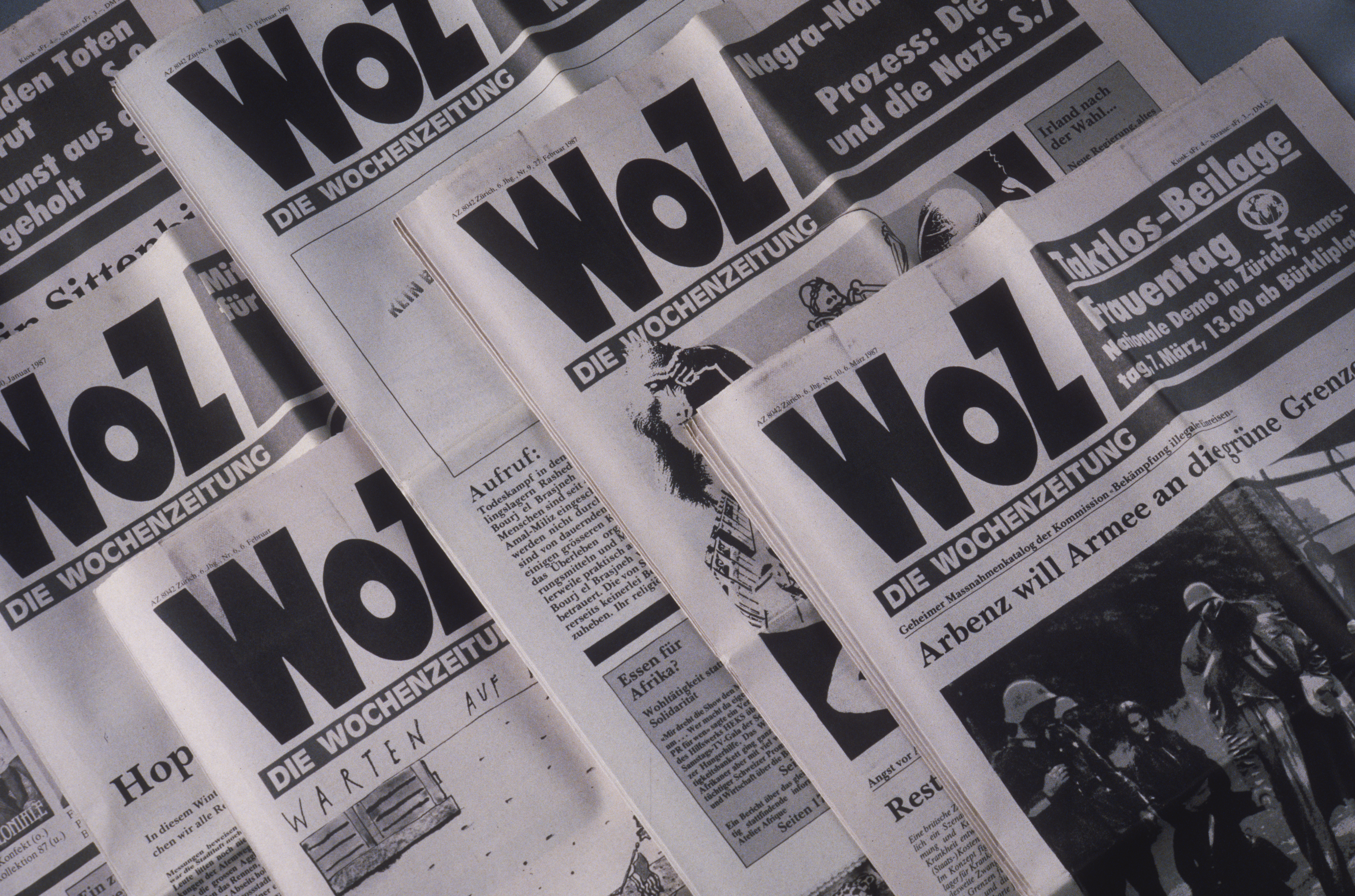
Front pages in 1987

The cooperative belongs to all employees who are employed for at least half time. The equity of the WOZ consists of one-time membership fees of current and former cooperative members. The editorial meeting is responsible for newspaper content. Decisions of greater consequence are decided by the plenary of the cooperative members. Many staff officials are in one or more working groups or commissions within the company. The company has over fifty employees and an annual turnover of around five million Swiss Francs. Since 1984 WOZ has been supported by the ProWOZ society, whose members more than double the subscription bases.

WOZ claims to be the only independent national newspaper in German-speaking Switzerland: it doesn't belong to either a political party, association or media company, and aims to deliver critical high-quality journalism. In addition to its thirty editors, it also has a broad network of freelance journalists. According to the readership study MACH Basic, WOZ reaches 109,000 regular readers with a weekly circulation of 19,359 copies (WEMF 2025-2026). WOZ was the highest ranked media product in terms of quality of coverage among magazines, weeklys and Sunday newspapers in Switzerland in independent 2018 and 2020 studies.

== See also ==
- Rotpunktverlag

== Literature ==
- Carmen Berchtold, Jürg Fischer, Constantin Seibt (texts) and Gertrud Vogler (photography): Das Buch Monster: 100 Fälle aus der Praxis der Familie Monster. WoZ, Zürich 1997, ISBN 3906236021.
- Stefan Howald: Links und bündig. Eine alternative Mediengeschichte. Rotpunktverlag, Zürich 2018. ISBN 978-3-85869-755-4.
