= Katsumi Furitsu =

Katsumi Furitsu (振津 かつみ, Furitsu Katsumi; born in 1959) is a medical genetics research. She has a doctorate in medical genetics and radiation biology from Japan's Osaka University and currently works in the genetics department of the Hyogo College of Medicine. She became involved in peace and anti-nuclear movement activities as a student in 1980, helping radiation victims. From 1986 to 2000, Furitsu was a member of the "Investigation committee of A-bomb survivors" at Osaka's Hannan Chuo Hospital. She visits the Chernobyl disaster area every year and is a founder of Osaka's "Chernobyl Relief Group of Kansai". In 1992, Katsumi Furitsu attended the "World Uranium Hearing" in Salzburg. In 1996, she testified to the Permanent People's Tribunal, Chernobyl Session in Vienna. Since 2004 Furitsu has been a member of the International Coalition to Ban Uranium Weapons.

In 2012, Furitsu won a Nuclear-Free Future Award. Furitsu regularly visits areas affected by the radiation and other impacts of the "nuclear supply chain", including uranium mining sites in native people's land in the United States, the downwind area of the Nevada Test Site, and the polluted Hanford Site. She is also helping with the health impacts of the Fukushima disaster.

== See also ==
- Mizuho Fukushima
- Jinzaburo Takagi
- Anti-nuclear power movement in Japan
- Hibakusha
- Thomas Banyacya
