= Cigdem Akyol =

German journalist and author (born 1978)

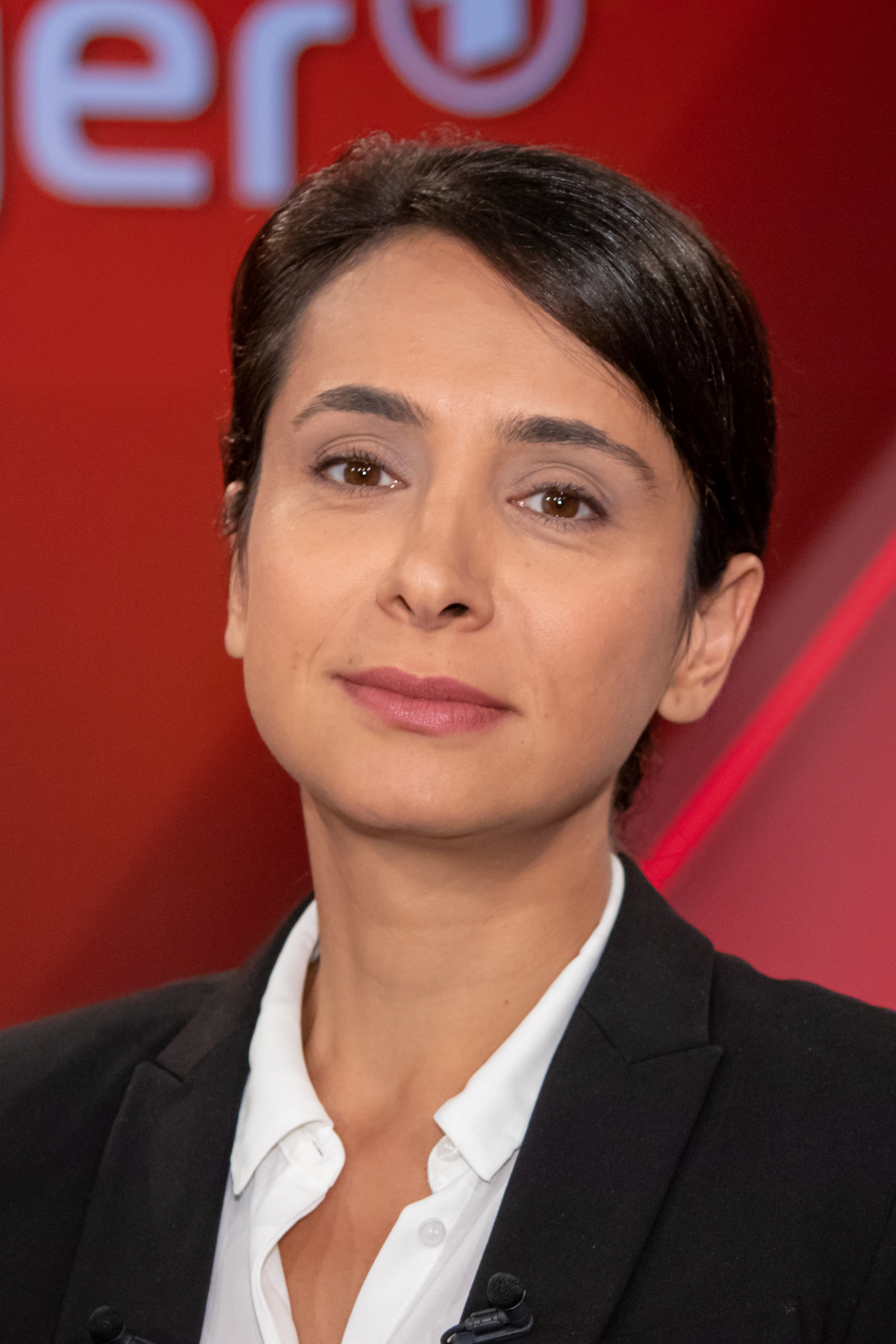
- Akyol in 2018
- Born: October 1978 (age 47); Herne, North Rhine-Westphalia, West Germany
- Education: University of Cologne
- Occupation: Journalist
- Writing career
- Notable work: Ich wollte nie in die Türkei

Cigdem Akyol (born October 1978) is a German journalist and author of Turkish-Kurdish ancestry.

== Biography ==
Akyols parents moved from Turkey to Germany in 1973 and settled in the Ruhr region in Herne. Akyol grew up in Herne, where she attended the Haranni-Gymnasium (high school). After her graduation in 1998 she studied international law and Eastern European history at the University of Cologne. Then she moved to Berlin to attend a journalism school and began working as a journalist. From 2006 to 2014, she worked for Berlin-based national German newspaper Die Tageszeitung, for which she often reported from abroad. In 2014, she accepted a temporary position the Deutsche Presse-Agentur offered in Istanbul. After the completion of her term she remained in Istanbul working as a freelance journalist and book author.

In 2015, she published a book about Turkey in the 21st century, describing it as a conflicted split society and in 2016 she followed it up with an extensive biography of the Turkish politician and president Recep Tayyip Erdoğan.

Since 2019, Akyol has been a staff writer at the Swiss weekly WOZ.

In 2024, Akyol published her first novel about a family of Turkish immigrants in Germany.

== Books ==
- Generation Erdogan. Die Türkei – ein zerrissenes Land im 21. Jahrhundert. Kremayr & Scheriau, 2015, ISBN 978-3-218-00969-0
- Erdogan: Die Biografie. Herder, 2016, ISBN 978-3451328862
- Die gespaltene Republik. Die Türkei von Atatürk bis Erdoğan, S. Fischer 2023, Frankfurt a. M. April 2023, ISBN 978-3-10-397138-5
- Geliebte Mutter – Canım Annem. Steidl, 2024, ISBN 9783969994023 (novel)
