= Sun Xiaodi =

Chinese environmentalist

Sun Xiaodi has spent more than a decade petitioning the central Chinese authorities over radioactive contamination from the No. 792 Uranium Mine in the Gannan Tibetan Autonomous Prefecture in Gansu Province. In 2006, he received the prestigious Nuclear-Free Future Award.

== See also ==
- List of Nuclear-Free Future Award recipients
- Uranium in the environment
- Uranium mining debate
