= Rizlan Bernier-Latmani =

Swiss researcher

Academic work
- Institutions: EPFL (École Polytechnique Fédérale de Lausanne)

Rizlan Bernier-Latmani (born in 1972) is a Swiss researcher. She is an associate professor of environmental sciences and engineering at the EPFL (École Polytechnique Fédérale de Lausanne) and the head of the Environmental Microbiology Laboratory. She is known for her activism for gender equality.

== Career ==
Bernier-Latmani's academic career started off with a bachelor's degree in Natural Resources at Cornell University, Ithaca, NY. A master's degree in Civil and Environmental Engineering at Stanford University, CA followed suit. She stayed at Stanford University for her PhD and wrote her doctoral thesis on the biodegradation of uranyl (UO22+)-complexed citrate and implications for uranyl mobility in the subsurface. She spent her time as a post-graduate researcher at the Scripps Institution of Oceanography in La Jolla, California. In 2005, she started working for the Swiss institution EPFL. Starting off as an assistant professor, she became an associate professor in 2013.

== Research ==
Bernier-Latmani's fields of expertise include for example geomicrobiology, deep subsurface microbes, uranium biogeochemistry and isotope geochemistry. Her research focuses mostly on the biological degradation of metallic contaminants in organic materials.

In 2013, she drew attention to herself with a research study about natural wetlands and the mobility of the uranium present.

Her research in 2020 focused on the microbial remediation of inorganic contamination of soils and groundwater.

Bernier-Latmani and the Environmental Microbiology Laboratory are researching five different topics: arsenic biochemistry, microbes in nuclear waste disposal, microbial iron reduction, uranium biogeochemistry and gut microbiome.

== Activism ==
As chairwoman of the organisation "Women Professor Forum" of the ETH Zürich and EPFL, she has also contributed to the fight for gender equality in the scientific community. She has been speaking up about the under-representation of women in leading positions in higher education.

== Academic honors ==
- Rotary Foundation University Professor Grant (2004)

== Selected works ==
- Dobias, J.; Bernier-Latmani, R. (2013). "Silver Release from Silver Nanoparticles in Natural Waters" (PDF). Environmental Science & Technology. 47 (9): 4140–4146. Bibcode:2013EnST...47.4140D. doi:10.1021/es304023p. PMID 23517230.
- Bernier-Latmani, Rizlan; Veeramani, Harish; Vecchia, Elena Dalla; Junier, Pilar; Lezama-Pacheco, Juan S.; Suvorova, Elena I.; Sharp, Jonathan O.; Wigginton, Nicholas S.; Bargar, John R. (2010). "Non-uraninite Products of Microbial U(VI) Reduction" (PDF). Environmental Science & Technology. 44 (24): 9456–9462. Bibcode:2010EnST...44.9456B. doi:10.1021/es101675a. PMID 21069950.
- Nazarova, Tatiana; Alessi, Daniel S.; Janssen, David J.; Bernier-Latmani, Rizlan; Wanner, Christoph (2020). "In Situ Biostimulation of Cr(VI) Reduction in a Fast-Flowing Oxic Aquifer". ACS Earth and Space Chemistry. 4 (11): 2018–2030. Bibcode:2020ESC.....4.2018N. doi:10.1021/acsearthspacechem.0c00200. S2CID 228830028.
- Junier, Pilar; Junier, Thomas; Podell, Sheila; Sims, David R.; Detter, John C.; Lykidis, Athanasios; Han, Cliff S.; Wigginton, Nicholas S.; Gaasterland, Terry; Bernier-Latmani, Rizlan (2010). "The genome of the Gram-positive, metal- and sulfate-reducing bacterium Desulfotomaculum reducens strain MI-1". Environmental Microbiology. 12 (10): 2738–2754. doi:10.1111/j.1462-2920.2010.02242.x. PMC 5662442. PMID 20482743.
