= World Uranium Hearing =

1992 anti-nuclear hearing in Salzburg, Austria

The World Uranium Hearing was held in Salzburg, Austria in September 1992. Anti-nuclear speakers from all continents, including indigenous speakers and scientists, testified to the health and environmental problems of uranium mining and processing, nuclear power, nuclear weapons, nuclear tests, and radioactive waste disposal.

People who spoke at the 1992 Hearing include: Thomas Banyacya, Katsumi Furitsu, Manuel Pino and Floyd Red Crow Westerman. They said they were deeply dismayed by the atomic bombings of Hiroshima and Nagasaki and highlighted what they called the inherently destructive nature of all phases of the nuclear supply chain. They recalled the disastrous impact of nuclear weapons testing in places such as the Nevada Test Site, Bikini Atoll and Eniwetok, Tahiti, Maralinga, and Central Asia. They highlighted the threat of radioactive contamination to all peoples, especially indigenous communities and said that their survival requires self-determination and emphasis on spiritual and cultural values. Increased renewable energy commercialization was advocated.

The proceedings were published as a book, Poison fire, sacred earth testimonies, lectures, conclusions. The outcome document, the Declaration of Salzburg was accepted by the United Nations Working Group on Indigenous Populations.

== See also ==
- International Uranium Film Festival
- Uranium in the environment
- History of the anti-nuclear movement
- The Navajo People and Uranium Mining
- Uranium mining debate
- List of Nuclear-Free Future Award recipients
- Hibakusha
