= Uranium mining debate =

Radiological impact of uranium mining

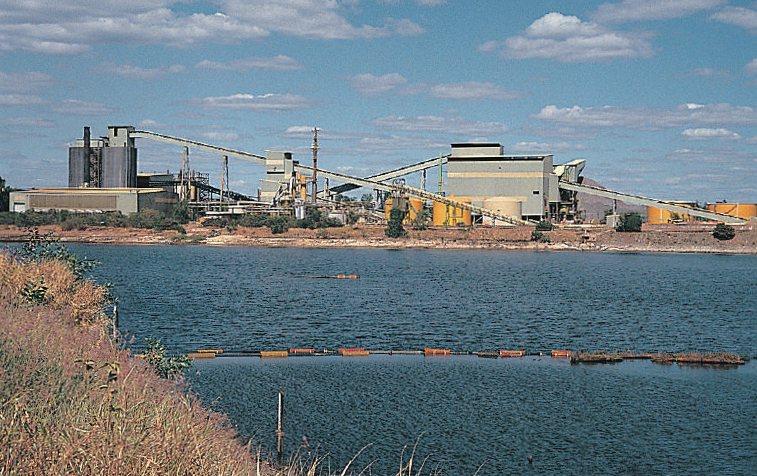
Ranger Uranium Mine in Kakadu National Park.

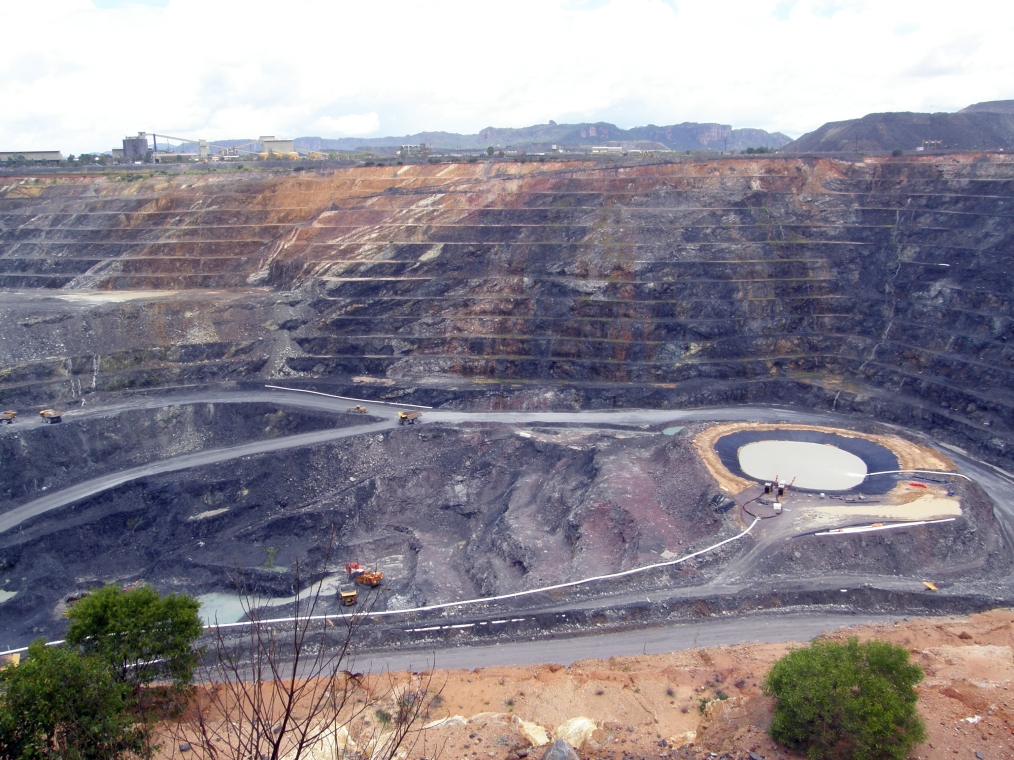
Ranger Uranium Mine, number 3 pit

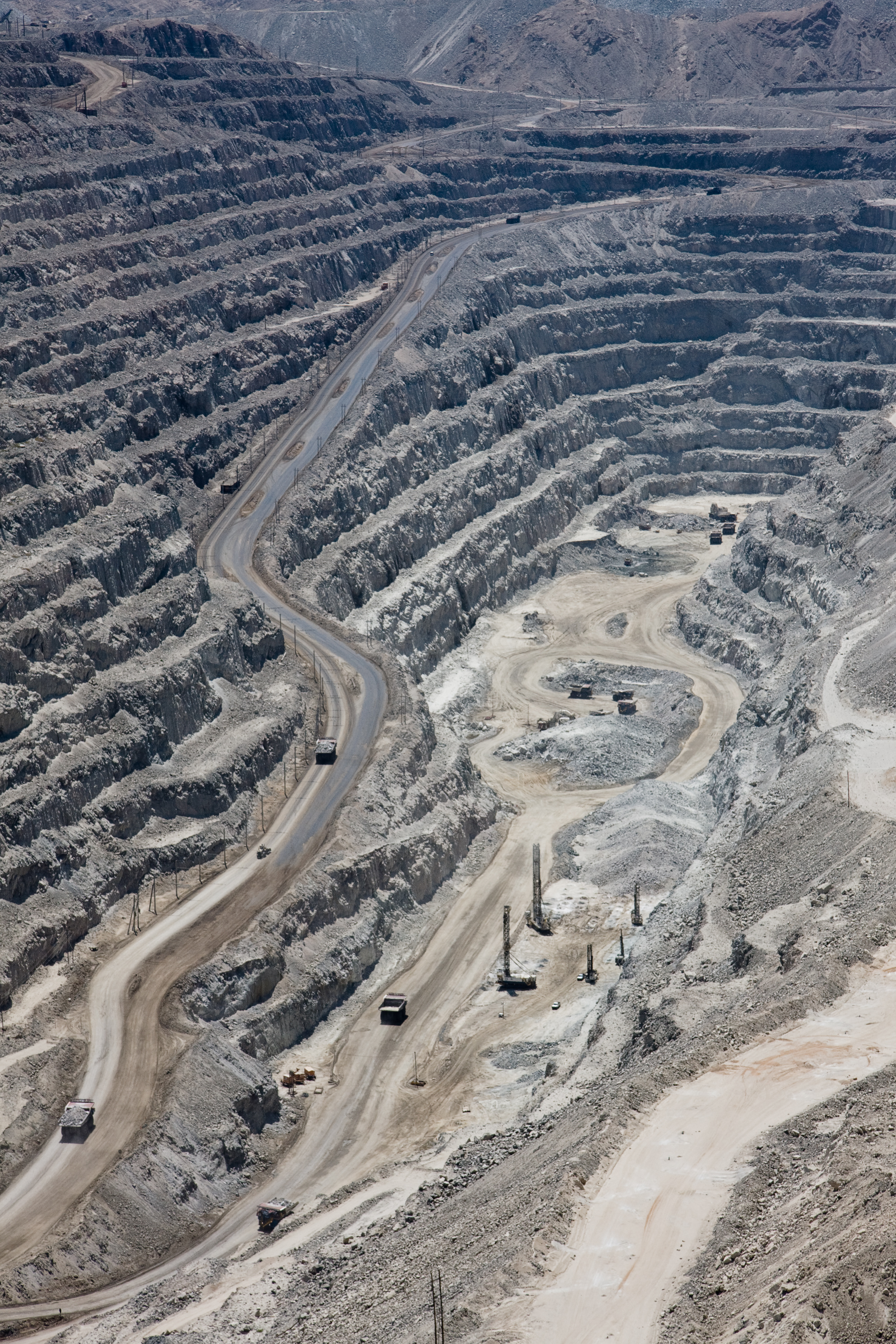
Arandis Mine

The uranium mining debate covers the political and environmental controversies of uranium mining for use in either nuclear power or nuclear weapons.

Nuclear fuels such as uranium have a much higher energy density than chemical fuels, such as coal, oil, and gas. Over its lifetime, nuclear power releases much less carbon dioxide per kWh than alternatives such as fossil fuels and solar, although more than hydropower and wind power. Nuclear power is not renewable, although advancements in technologies such as nuclear fuel reprocessing may make it more sustainable in the future.

Kazakhstan has the highest production of uranium even though Namibia has the world's longest operating open pit uranium mine. Australia, which possesses the largest single uranium deposit, has seen uranium grow into a major political issue due to health risk and environmental damage concerns.

Uranium mining is controversial because it produces hazardous gas and impacts miners if proper ventilation is not installed. Exposure from either mining or processing can lead to cancer and can contaminate ground or surface water.

Uranium has had a disproportionately negative effect on native peoples. Many native lands are on top of uranium-rich soils, leading them to be overrepresented in mining or being contaminated. A gendered impact on the Laguna Pueblo community was observed since the men were employed by the mines and the economy began to shift from agricultural to wage-earning.

== Pro-uranium mining debate ==
=== Power generation ===
The power generated in 1996 from nuclear energy fuelled by uranium surpassed all energy produced globally some 40 years before. 1 kg of uranium in a nuclear power plant produces 50,000 kWh, making it more resource efficient than other methods of energy production.

=== Failure of the energy industry ===
Though the Chernobyl incident and uranium mining have a high death toll, dam failures have caused thousands of deaths and displacements, and the Bhopal chemical plant incident caused 3000 early deaths. Dams in Italy and India caused several thousand fatalities. Coal mine accidents and explosions at natural gas plants have also caused historical death tolls. LNG leakages have also caused many disasters. Oil spills, too, have ruined marine coastlines for years to come with spillages and explosions have caused lives to be lost. Thus, the risks associated with nuclear energy and uranium mining are more likely attributable to the failures of the energy industry itself.

=== Nuclear energy potential ===
Nuclear energy powered by uranium is one of the safest and cleanest forms of energy on the planet. It produces only 6 tonnes of carbon dioxide per gigawatt-hour of electricity compared to coal's 970 tonnes and has the second lowest death rate among the top eight energy production methods. Uranium is a necessary input for nuclear power.

=== Sustainability of nuclear energy ===
Nuclear energy has gotten safer as its technology advanced. 1 death occurred as a result of both the Fukushima nuclear accident and the Three Mile Island accident. Even though current uranium reserves means humans only have 200 more years of legacy, advanced nuclear energy is sustainable for thousands of years. Current reserves could power them for 9000 years, not counting the waste from legacy reactors that can also be used. It is also considere more sustainable than solar and wind energy. There are currently two operational reactors, but the technology is still working to be commercialized. To end fossil fuel dependence, humans need to find energy generating methods to replace crude oil. MIT is currently leading a nuclear biorefining initiative, a technology that can be deployed at scale in about 20 years.

== Background and public debate ==
In 2024 Kazakhstan produced the largest share of uranium from mines (39% of world supply), followed by Canada (24%) and Namibia (12%). Australia has 28% of the world's uranium ore reserves and the world's largest single uranium deposit, located at the Olympic Dam Mine in South Australia.

The years 1976 and 1977 saw uranium mining become a major political issue in Australia, with the Ranger Inquiry (Fox) report opening up a public debate about uranium mining. The Movement Against Uranium Mining group was formed in 1976, and many protests and demonstrations against uranium mining were held. Concerns relate to the health risks and environmental damage from uranium mining.

In 1977, the National Conference of the Australian Labor Party (ALP) passed a motion in favour of an indefinite moratorium on uranium mining, and the anti-nuclear movement in Australia acted to support the Labor Party and help it regain office. However, after the ALP won power in 1983, the 1984 ALP conference voted in favour of a "Three mine policy".

Australia has three operating uranium mines at Olympic Dam (Roxby) and Beverley - both in South Australia's north - and at Ranger in the Northern Territory. In 2011, construction on South Australia's fourth uranium mine, the Honeymoon Uranium Mine, was completed.

The Rössing Uranium Mine located in Namibia is the world's longest-operating open-pit uranium mine. The uranium mill tailings dam has been leaking for a number of years, and on January 17, 2014, a catastrophic structural failure of a leach tank caused a major spill. The France-based laboratory, Commission de Recherche et d'Information Independentantes sur la Radioactivite (CRIIAD) reported elevated levels of radioactive materials in the area surrounding the mine.

Notable anti-uranium activists include Golden Misabiko (Democratic Republic of the Congo), Kevin Buzzacott (Australia), Jacqui Katona (Australia), Yvonne Margarula (Australia), Jillian Marsh (Australia), Manuel Pino (US), JoAnn Tall (US), and Sun Xiaodi (China). There have been many reports about working conditions at the mine, and the effects on the mine laborers.

World Uranium Mining Production
Country	Production in 2024 (tonnes)
Kazakhstan	23,270
Canada	14,309
Namibia	7,333
Australia	4,598
Uzbekistan (estimated)	4,000
Russia	2,738
Niger	962
China (estimated)	1,600
India (estimated)	500
South Africa (estimated)	200
Ukraine (estimated)	288
USA	260
Others	155

== Health risks of uranium mining ==
Because uranium ore emits radon gas, uranium mining can be more dangerous than other underground mining, unless adequate ventilation systems are installed. During the 1950s, many Navajos in the U.S. became uranium miners, as many uranium deposits were discovered on Navajo reservations. A statistically significant subset of these early miners later developed small cell carcinoma after exposure to uranium ore. Radon-222, a natural decay product of uranium, has been shown to be the cancer-causing agent. Some American survivors and their descendants have received compensation under the Radiation Exposure Compensation Act which was enacted in 1990, and as of 2016 continue to receive and award claims. Successful claimants include uranium miners, mill workers and ore transporters.

Residues from processing of uranium ore can also be a source of Radon. Radon resulting from the high radium content in uncovered dumps and tailing ponds can be easily released into the atmosphere.

Also possible is the contamination of ground water and surface water with uranium by leaching processes. In July 2011, the World Health Organization (WHO) released the fourth edition of its guidelines for drinking-water quality. The drinking water guidance level for uranium was increased to 30 μg/L. This limit can be exceeded near mill tailings or mining sites.

Tetravalent uranium is commonly assumed to form insoluble species and such strategy was employed to reduce the risk of uranium leakage near mining sites. However, the presence of U(IV) in soil bound to amorphous Al-P-Fe-Si aggregates as a non-crystalline species was detected by Rizlan Bernier-Latmani and coworkers into a stream that joined a mining-impacted wetland in France, raising suspicious that phenomena of uranium leakage could be greater than previously imagined.

In January 2008 Areva was nominated for an Anti Oscar Award. The French state-owned company mines uranium in northern Niger where mine workers are not informed about health risks, and analysis shows radioactive contamination of air, water and soil. The local organization that represents the mine workers spoke of "suspicious deaths among the workers, caused by radioactive dust and contaminated groundwater".

== Uranium mining and indigenous peoples ==
Large-scale uranium mining operations throughout the world have had a significant impact on indigenous peoples and their ways of life, raising questions concerning economic development of "remote regions" in relation to the impact on traditions life styles of these cultures, and resulting health and environmental hazards. The Jabiluka uranium mine is located in Kakadu National Park, Australia, is a World Heritage Site and home to the Mirrar Aboriginal culture. A dispute exists between the mining industry, the Mirrar people represented by Yvonne Margarula, ecologists and politicians on the implications of post-colonialism in relation to the impacts on the health and vitality of humans and other species, and effects on scarce water resources. The impact of uranium mining, milling and processing for India's burgeoning nuclear power industry has created controversy between indigenous peoples and mining and energy development. Winona LaDuke, spokesperson for Native Americans and First Nations has written extensively on the impact of uranium mining on indigenous communities.

The Jackpile Uranium Mine was the world's largest open-pit uranium mine until its closure in the 1980s. The mine, located on Laguna Pueblo land in New Mexico covered approximately 2,500 acres, and employed Laguna, Canyoncito, Acoma and Zuni Pueblo people, as well as the Navajo. The Jackpile Mine had a significant gendered impact on the Laguna Pueblo community. The mine employed men from the community, which shifted the economy form largely agricultural to wage-earning, with mostly men working in the mine. Laguna Pueblo culture is traditionally matriarchal and matrilineal. Men earning wages, gave them more power in and outside the community. Because the Mine operated 24/7, mine workers often missed participating in ceremonies to go to work.

== See also ==
- Church Rock uranium mill spill
- Environmental racism
- Nuclear labor issues
- Nuclear power debate
- Nuclear weapons debate
- The Navajo People and Uranium Mining
- The Return of Navajo Boy
