= Nuclear-Free Future Award =

Award given to anti-nuclear activists, organizations and communities

Since 1998, the Nuclear-Free Future Award (NFFA) is an award given to anti-nuclear activists, organizations and communities.

== Laureates ==
The Nuclear-Free Future Award Laureates:

2016: Johannesburg, South Africa

- Resistance: Arif Ali Cangi, Turkey
- Education: Bruno Chareyron, France
- Solutions: Samson Tsegaye, Ethiopia
- Special Recognition: Susi Snyder, Netherlands/International and Alfred Manyanyata Sepepe, South Africa

2012: Heiden, Germany

- Resistance: Gabriela Tsukamoto, Portugal
- Education: Katsumi Furitsu, Japan
- Solutions: Yves Marignac, France
- Special recognition: Susan Boos, Switzerland
- Lifetime achievement: Sebastian Pflugbeil, Germany

2006: Window Rock, USA

- Phil Harrison
- Resistance: Sun Xiaodi, China
- Education: Gordon Edwards, Canada
- Solutions: Wolfgang Scheffler and Heide Hoedt, Germany
- Lifetime achievement: Ed Grothus, Santa Fe, N.M.
- Special recognition: Southwest Research and Information Center of Albuquerque, N.M.

2004: Jaipur, India

- Opposition: JOAR, indigenous Indian farmers (which has sought to defend the health of the tribal peoples who live near the state-operated Jaduguda uranium mine in Bihar)
- Education: Asaf Durakovic, American nuclear medic (who founded the Uranium Medical Research Center, an independent non-profit institute which studies the effects of uranium contamination)
- Solutions: Jonathan Schell, American journalist, author and peace activist
- Lifetime Achievement: Hildegard Breiner, Austria (the "grand dame" of the Austrian grassroots environmental movement, who protested against the Zwentendorf nuclear facility)
- Special Recognition: the IndianCity Montessori School in Lucknow, India (the world's largest private school, which has a mission to create a nuclear-free future)

2002: St. Petersburg, Russia

- Opposition: Mordechai Vanunu, Israeli nuclear scientist
- Education: Ole Kopreitan
- Solutions: Helen Clark, prime minister of New Zealand
- Lifetime Achievement: Alexei Yablokov, Francis Macy
- Special Recognition: The Bulletin of the Atomic Scientists

== See also ==
- List of nuclear whistleblowers
- List of peace activists
- William and Katherine Estes Award
- Non-nuclear future
- Nuclear Free World Policy
- World Uranium Hearing
- Anti-nuclear movement
- Nuclear disarmament
- List of environmental awards
