= History of the anti-nuclear movement =

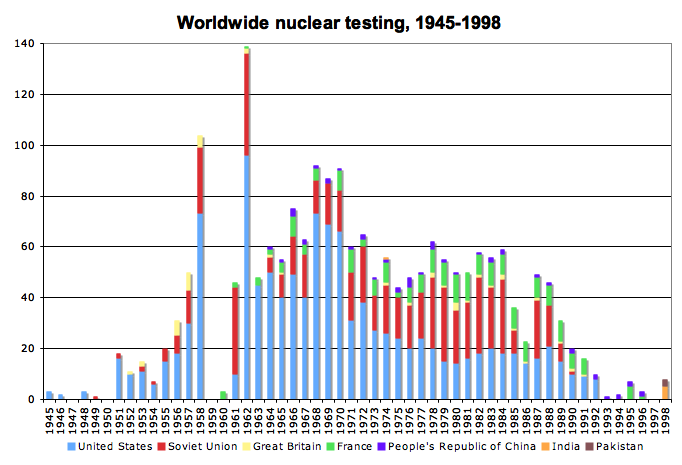
Worldwide nuclear testing totals, 1945–1998.

The application of nuclear technology, both as a source of energy and as an instrument of war, has been controversial.

Scientists and diplomats have debated nuclear weapons policy since before the atomic bombing of Hiroshima in 1945. The public became concerned about nuclear weapons testing from about 1954, following extensive nuclear testing in the Pacific. In 1961, at the height of the Cold War, about 50,000 women brought together by Women Strike for Peace marched in 60 cities in the United States to demonstrate against nuclear weapons. In 1963, many countries ratified the Partial Test Ban Treaty which prohibited atmospheric nuclear testing.

Some local opposition to nuclear power emerged in the early 1960s, and in the late 1960s some members of the scientific community began to express their concerns. In the early 1970s, there were large protests about the proposed nuclear power plant Wyhl, located at the Rhine in southern Germany. The project was cancelled in 1975 and anti-nuclear success at Wyhl inspired opposition to nuclear power in other parts of Europe and North America. Nuclear power became an issue of major public protest in the 1970s.

== Early years ==
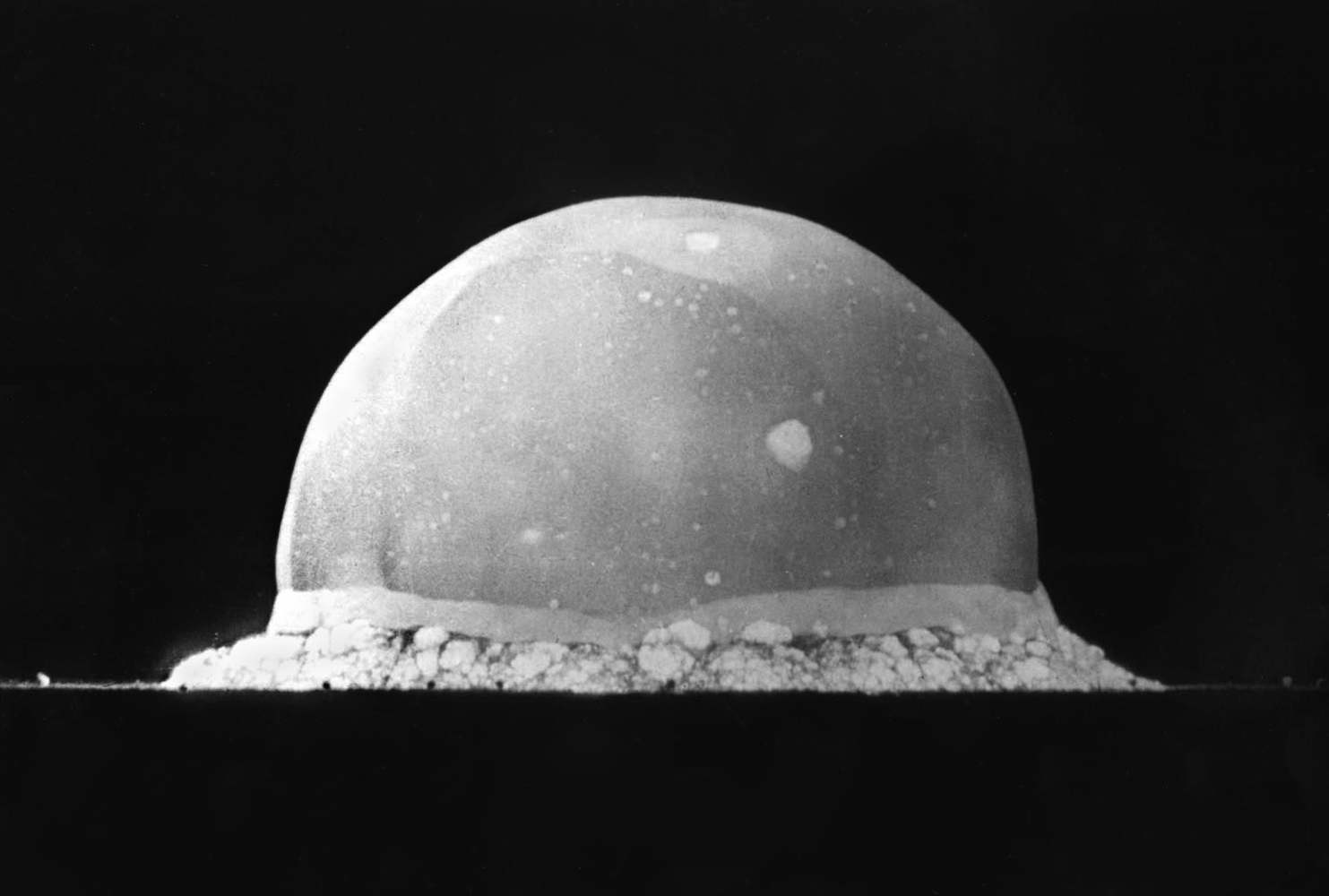
The 1945 Trinity explosion, 0.016 seconds after detonation. The fireball is about 200 meters (600 ft) wide. Trees may be seen as black objects in the foreground.

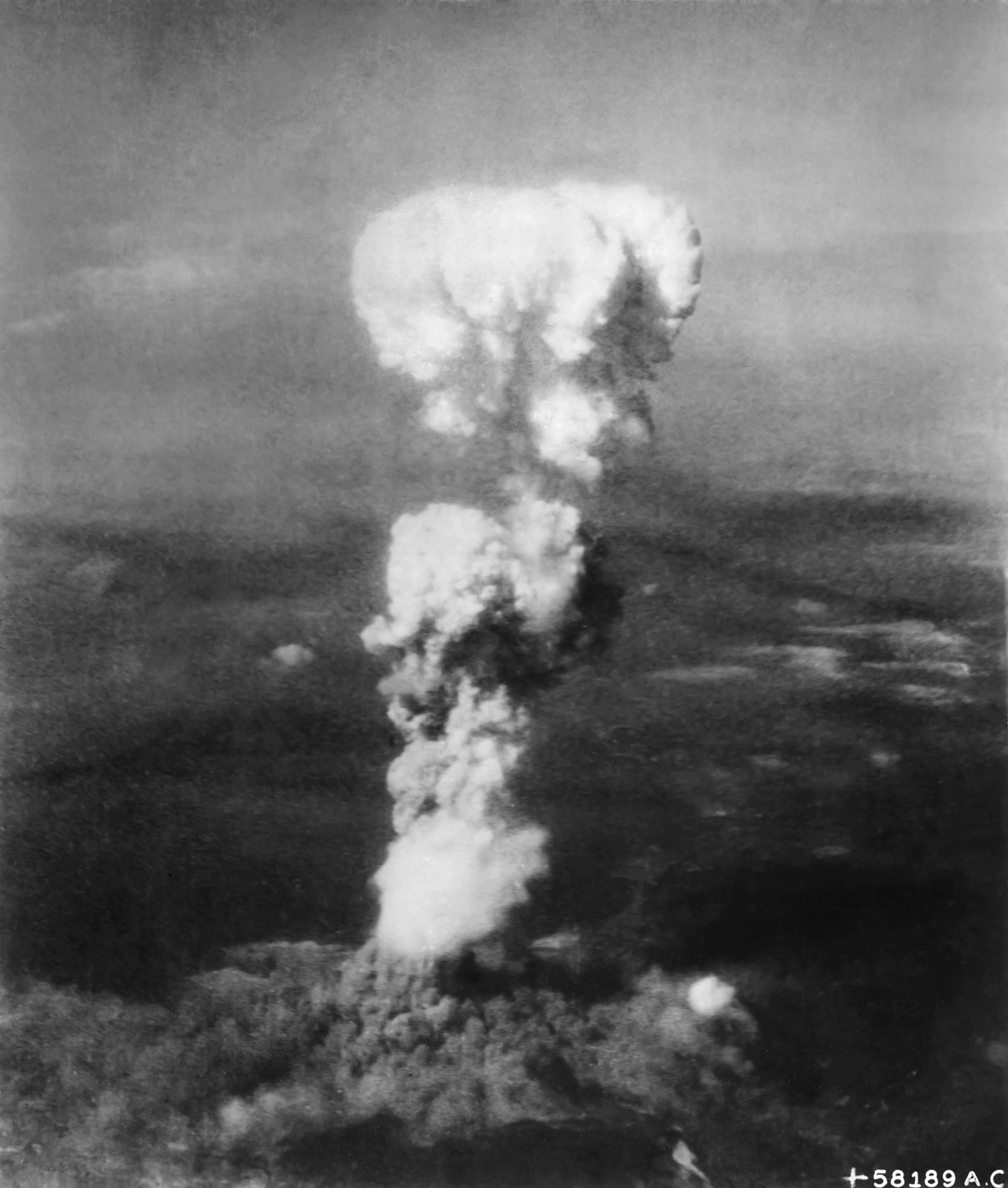
The mushroom cloud over Hiroshima after the dropping of the atomic bomb nicknamed 'Little Boy' (1945).

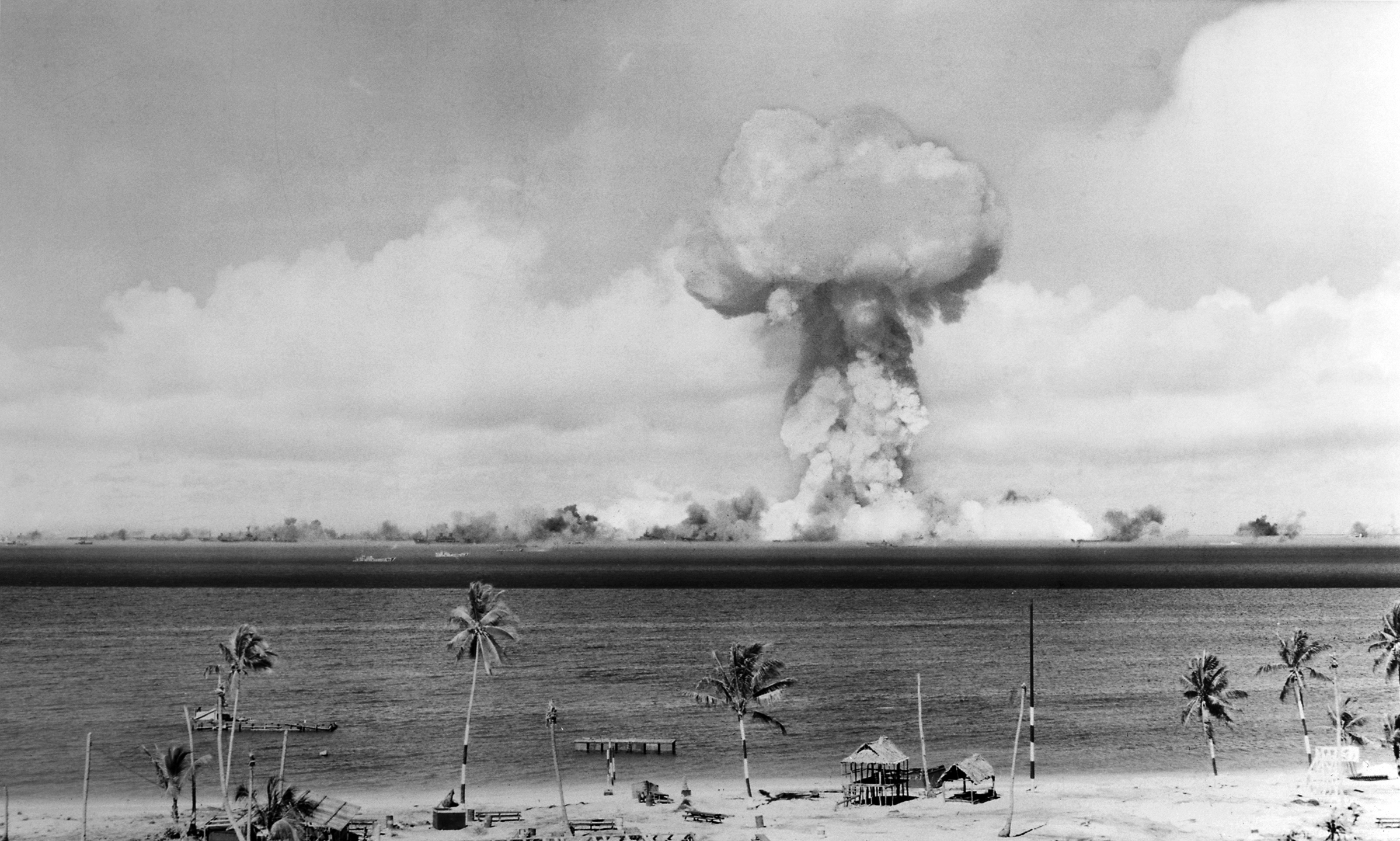
Operation Crossroads Test Able, a 23-kiloton air-deployed nuclear weapon detonated on July 1, 1946. This bomb used, and consumed, the infamous Demon core that took the lives of two scientists in two separate criticality accidents.

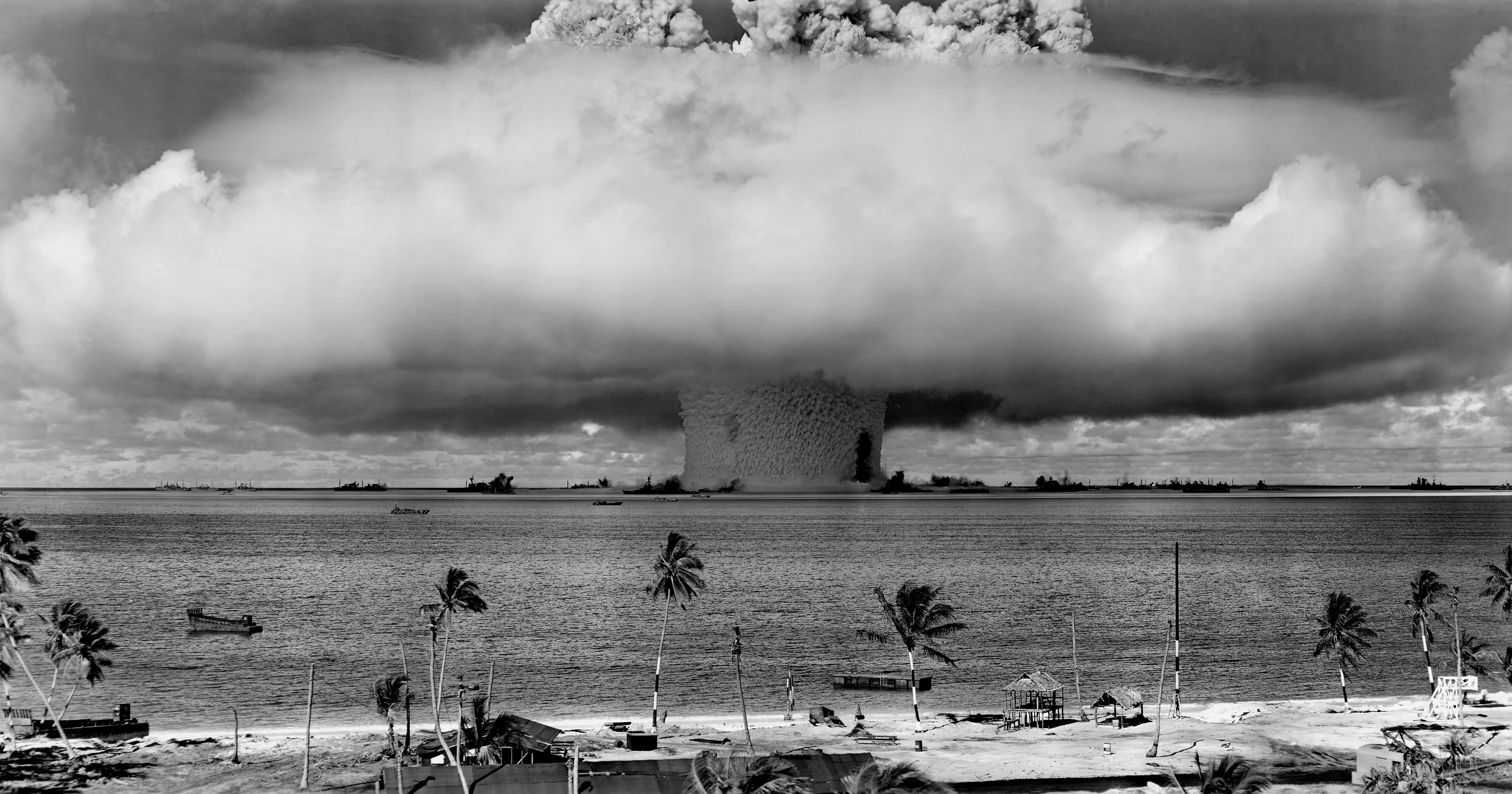
Mushroom-shaped cloud and water column from the underwater nuclear explosion of July 25, 1946, which was part of Operation Crossroads.

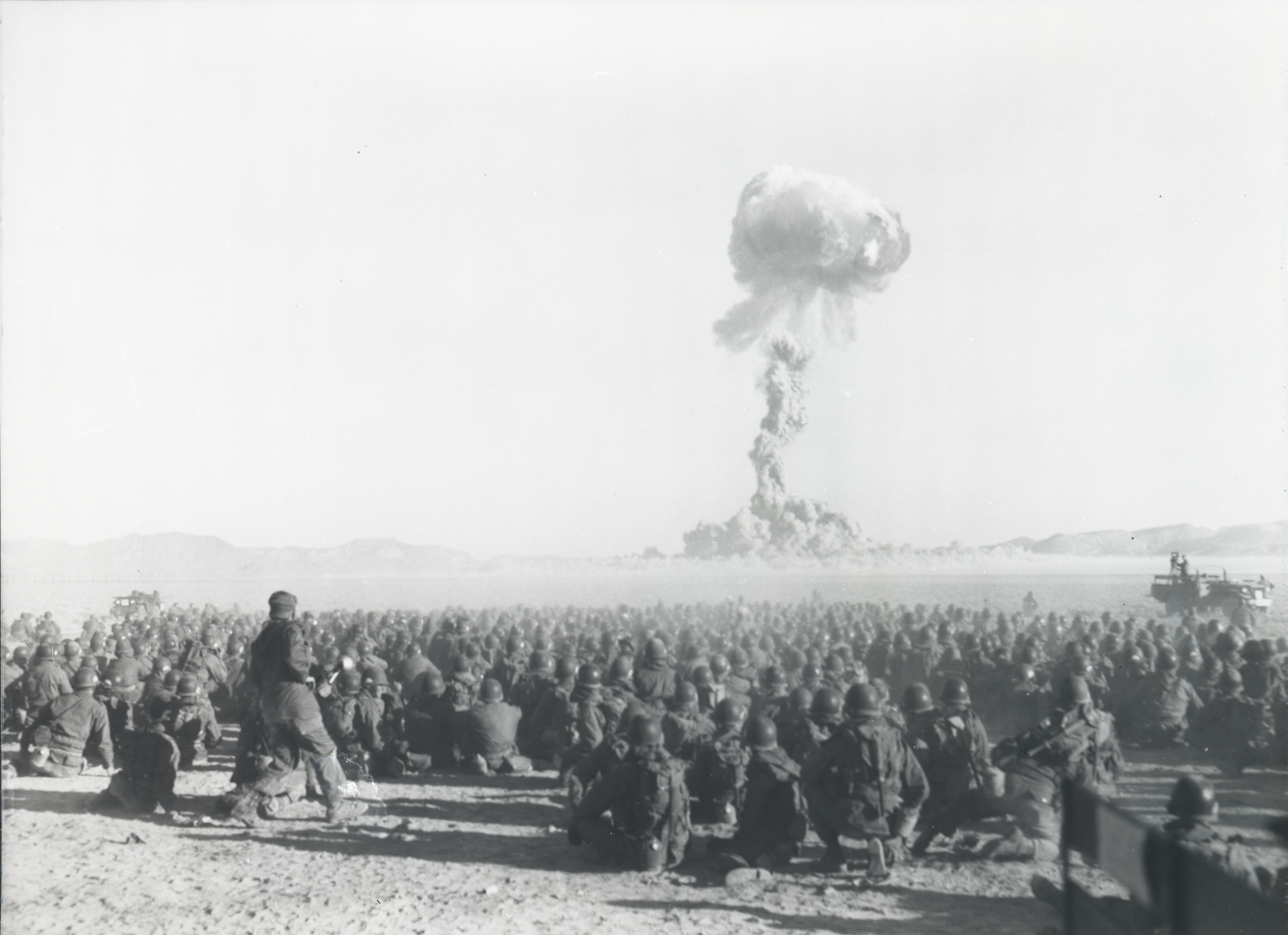
November 1951 nuclear test at the Nevada Test Site, from Operation Buster, with a yield of 21 kilotons. It was the first U.S. nuclear field exercise conducted on land; troops shown are 6 mi (9.7 km) from the blast.

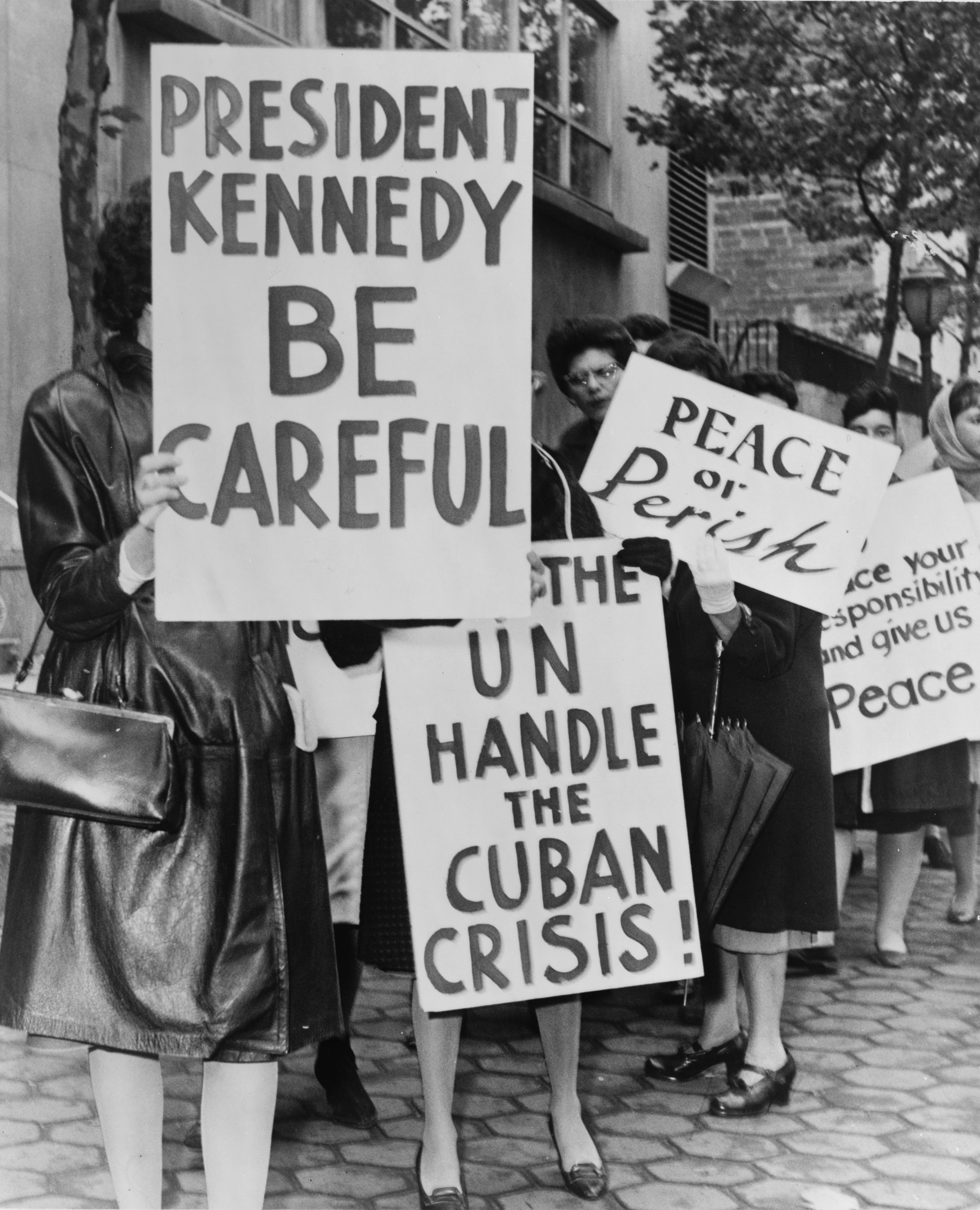
Women Strike for Peace during the Cuban Missile Crisis in 1962.

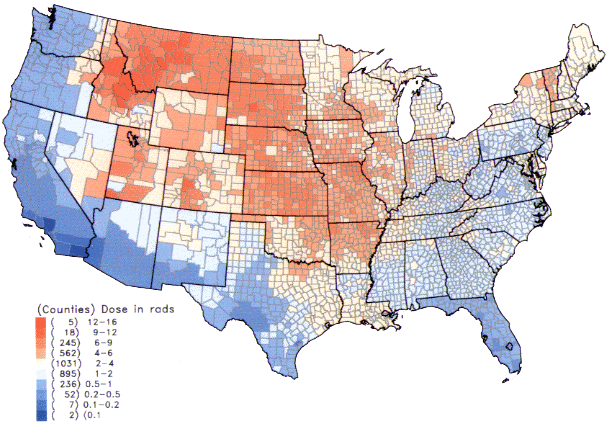
Because of concerns about worldwide fallout levels, the Partial Test Ban Treaty was signed in 1963. Above are the per capita thyroid doses (in rads) in the continental United States resulting from all exposure routes from all atmospheric nuclear tests conducted at the Nevada Test Site from 1951 to 1962.

The Phoenix of Hiroshima (foreground) in Hong Kong Harbor in 1967, was involved in several famous protest voyages against nuclear testing in the Pacific.

In 1945 in the New Mexico desert, American scientists conducted "Trinity," the first nuclear weapons test, marking the beginning of the atomic age. Even before the Trinity test, national leaders debated the impact of nuclear weapons on domestic and foreign policy. Also involved in the debate about nuclear weapons policy was the scientific community, through professional associations such as the Federation of Atomic Scientists and the Pugwash Conference on Science and World Affairs.

On August 6, 1945, towards the end of World War II, the Little Boy device was detonated over the Japanese military city of Hiroshima. Exploding with a yield equivalent to 12,500 tonnes of TNT, the blast and thermal wave of the bomb destroyed nearly 50,000 buildings (including the headquarters of the 2nd General Army and Fifth Division) and killed approximately 75,000 people, among them 20,000 Japanese soldiers and 20,000 Korean slave laborers. Detonation of the Fat Man device exploded over the Japanese industrial city of Nagasaki three days later after Hiroshima, destroying 60% of the city and killing approximately 35,000 people, among them 23,200–28,200 Japanese munitions workers, 2,000 Korean slave laborers, and 150 Japanese soldiers. The two bombings remains the only events where nuclear weapons have been used in combat. Subsequently, the world's nuclear weapons stockpiles grew.

Operation Crossroads was a series of nuclear weapon tests conducted by the United States at Bikini Atoll in the Pacific Ocean in the summer of 1946. Its purpose was to test the effect of nuclear weapons on naval ships. Pressure to cancel Operation Crossroads came from scientists and diplomats. Manhattan Project scientists argued that further nuclear testing was unnecessary and environmentally dangerous. A Los Alamos study warned "the water near a recent surface explosion will be a witch's brew" of radioactivity. To prepare the atoll for the nuclear tests, Bikini's native residents were evicted from their homes and resettled on smaller, uninhabited islands where they were unable to sustain themselves.

Radioactive fallout from nuclear weapons testing was first drawn to public attention in 1954 when a Hydrogen bomb test in the Pacific contaminated the crew of the Japanese fishing boat Lucky Dragon. One of the fishermen died in Japan seven months later. The incident caused widespread concern around the world and "provided a decisive impetus for the emergence of the anti-nuclear weapons movement in many countries". The anti-nuclear weapons movement grew rapidly because for many people the atomic bomb "encapsulated the very worst direction in which society was moving".

Peace movements emerged in Japan and in 1954 they converged to form a unified "Japanese Council Against Atomic and Hydrogen Bombs". Japanese opposition to the Pacific nuclear weapons tests was widespread, and "an estimated 35 million signatures were collected on petitions calling for bans on nuclear weapons".

German publications of the 1950s and 1960s contained criticism of some features of nuclear power including its safety. Nuclear waste disposal was widely recognized as a major problem, with concern publicly expressed as early as 1954. In 1964, one author went so far as to state "that the dangers and costs of the necessary final disposal of nuclear waste could possibly make it necessary to forego the development of nuclear energy".

The Russell–Einstein Manifesto was issued in London on July 9, 1955 by Bertrand Russell in the midst of the Cold War. It highlighted the dangers posed by nuclear weapons and called for world leaders to seek peaceful resolutions to international conflict. The signatories included eleven pre-eminent intellectuals and scientists, including Albert Einstein, who signed it just days before his death on April 18, 1955. A few days after the release, philanthropist Cyrus S. Eaton offered to sponsor a conference—called for in the manifesto—in Pugwash, Nova Scotia, Eaton's birthplace. This conference was to be the first of the Pugwash Conferences on Science and World Affairs, held in July 1957.

In the United Kingdom, the first Aldermaston March organised by the Campaign for Nuclear Disarmament took place at Easter 1958, when several thousand people marched for four days from Trafalgar Square, London, to the Atomic Weapons Research Establishment close to Aldermaston in Berkshire, England, to demonstrate their opposition to nuclear weapons. The Aldermaston marches continued into the late 1960s when tens of thousands of people took part in the four-day marches.

In 1959, a letter in the Bulletin of the Atomic Scientists was the start of a successful campaign to stop the Atomic Energy Commission dumping radioactive waste in the sea 19 kilometres from Boston.

On November 1, 1961, at the height of the Cold War, about 50,000 women brought together by Women Strike for Peace marched in 60 cities in the United States to demonstrate against nuclear weapons. It was the largest national women's peace protest of the 20th century.

In 1958, Linus Pauling and his wife presented the United Nations with the petition signed by more than 11,000 scientists calling for an end to nuclear-weapon testing. The "Baby Tooth Survey," headed by Dr Louise Reiss, demonstrated conclusively in 1961 that above-ground nuclear testing posed significant public health risks in the form of radioactive fallout spread primarily via milk from cows that had ingested contaminated grass. Public pressure and the research results subsequently led to a moratorium on above-ground nuclear weapons testing, followed by the Partial Test Ban Treaty, signed in 1963 by John F. Kennedy and Nikita Khrushchev. On the day that the treaty went into force, the Nobel Prize Committee awarded Pauling the Nobel Peace Prize, describing him as "Linus Carl Pauling, who ever since 1946 has campaigned ceaselessly, not only against nuclear weapons tests, not only against the spread of these armaments, not only against their very use, but against all warfare as a means of solving international conflicts."

Pauling started the International League of Humanists in 1974. He was president of the scientific advisory board of the World Union for Protection of Life and also one of the signatories of the Dubrovnik-Philadelphia Statement.

== After the Partial Test Ban Treaty ==
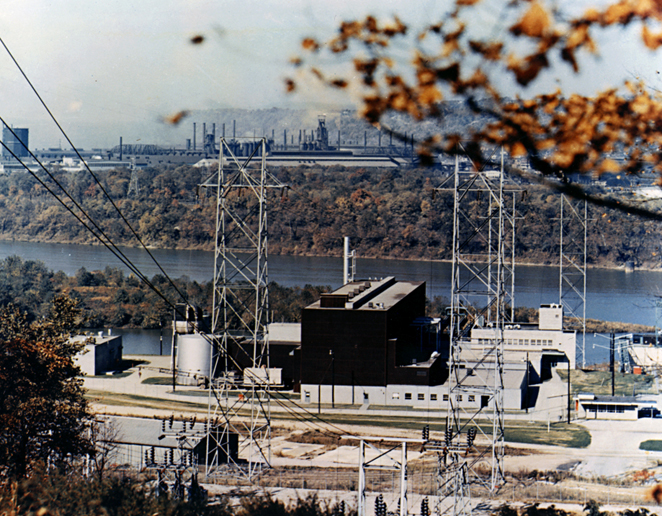
The Shippingport Atomic Power Station was the first full-scale PWR nuclear power plant in the United States. The reactor went online December 2, 1957, and was in operation until October, 1982.

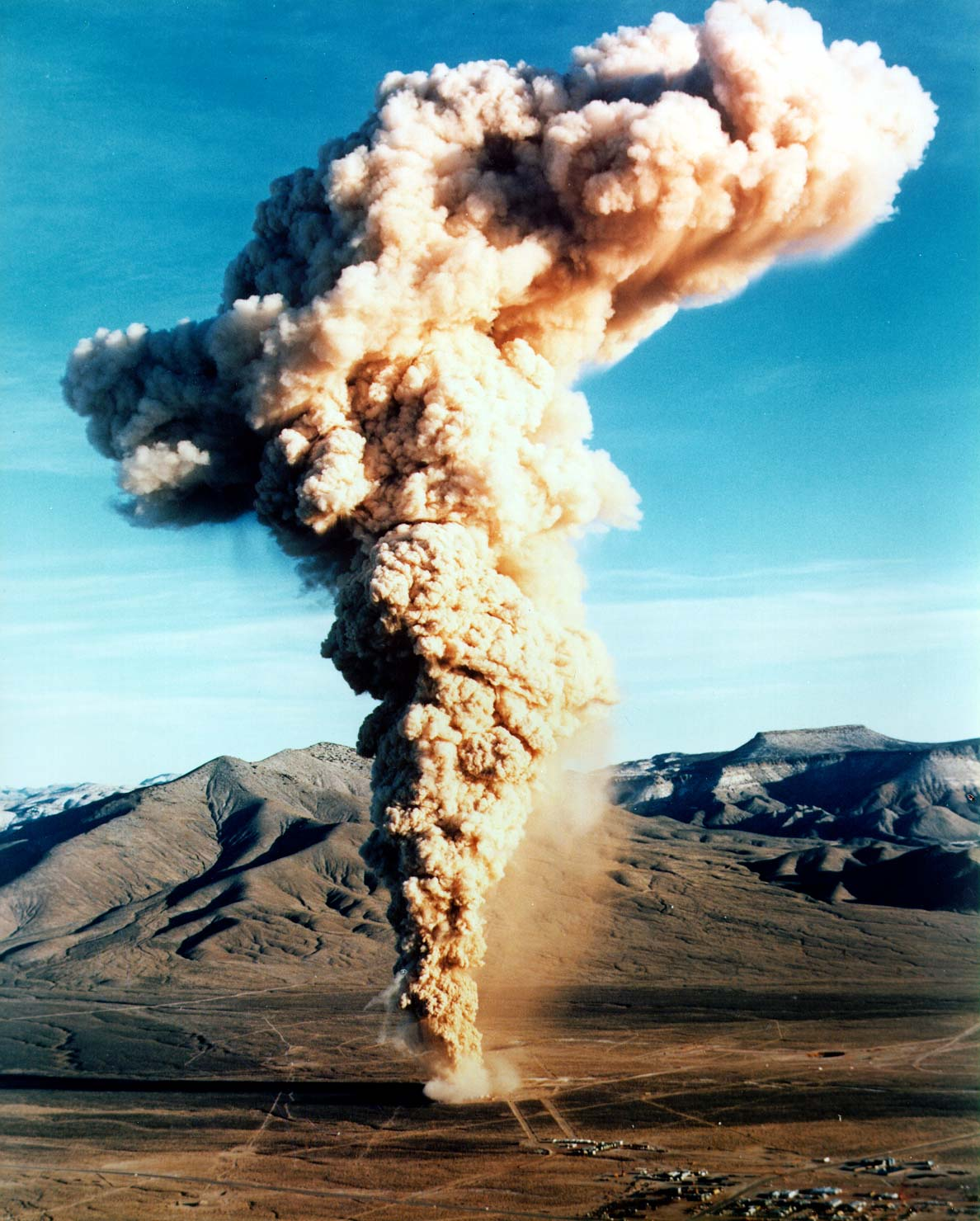
Radioactive materials were accidentally released from the 1970 Baneberry Nuclear Test at the Nevada Test Site.

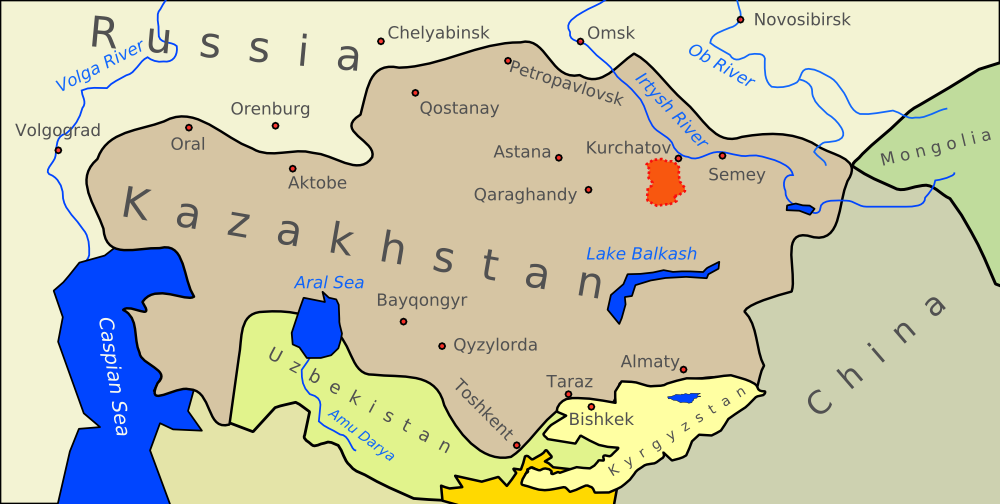
The 18,000 km^{2} expanse of the Semipalatinsk Test Site (indicated in red), which covers an area the size of Wales. The Soviet Union conducted 456 nuclear tests at Semipalatinsk from 1949 until 1989 with little regard for their effect on the local people or environment. The full impact of radiation exposure was hidden for many years by Soviet authorities and has only come to light since the test site closed in 1991.

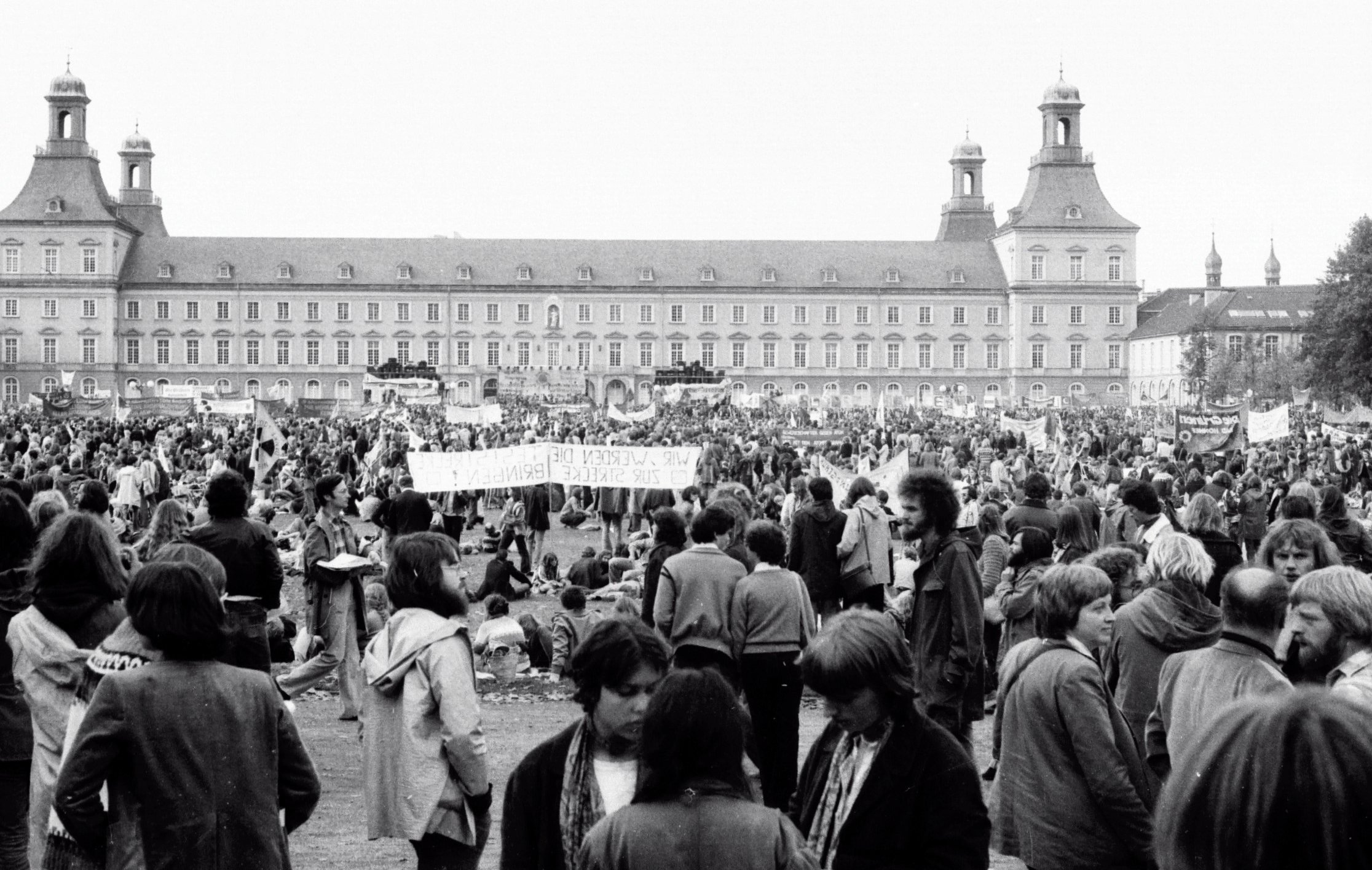
120,000 people attended an anti-nuclear protest in Bonn, Germany, on October 14, 1979, almost six months after the Three Mile Island accident.

In the United States, the first commercially viable nuclear power plant was to be built at Bodega Bay, north of San Francisco, but the proposal was controversial and conflict with local citizens began in 1958. The proposed plant site was close to the San Andreas Fault and close to the region's environmentally sensitive fishing and dairy industries. The Sierra Club became actively involved. The conflict ended in 1964, with the forced abandonment of plans for the power plant. Historian Thomas Wellock traces the birth of the anti-nuclear movement to the controversy over Bodega Bay. Attempts to build a nuclear power plant in Malibu were similar to those at Bodega Bay and were also abandoned.

In 1966, Larry Bogart founded the Citizens Energy Council, a coalition of environmental groups that published the newsletters "Radiation Perils," "Watch on the A.E.C." and "Nuclear Opponents". These publications argued that "nuclear power plants were too complex, too expensive and so inherently unsafe they would one day prove to be a financial disaster and a health hazard".

The emergence of the anti-nuclear power movement was "closely associated with the general rise in environmental consciousness which had started to materialize in the USA in the 1960s and quickly spread to other Western industrialized countries". Some nuclear experts began to voice dissenting views about nuclear power in 1969, and this was a necessary precondition for broad public concern about nuclear power to emerge. These scientists included Ernest Sternglass from Pittsburg, Henry Kendall from the Massachusetts Institute of Technology, Nobel laureate George Wald and radiation specialist Rosalie Bertell. These members of the scientific community "by expressing their concern over nuclear power, played a crucial role in demystifying the issue for other citizens", and nuclear power became an issue of major public protest in the 1970s.

In 1971, 15,000 people demonstrated against French plans to locate the first light-water reactor power plant in Bugey. This was the first of a series of mass protests organized at nearly every planned nuclear site in France.

Also in 1971, the town of Wyhl, in Germany, was a proposed site for a nuclear power station. In the years that followed, public opposition steadily mounted, and there were large protests. Television coverage of police dragging away farmers and their wives helped to turn nuclear power into a major issue. In 1975, an administrative court withdrew the construction licence for the plant, but the Wyhl occupation generated ongoing debate. This initially centred on the state government's handling of the affair and associated police behaviour, but interest in nuclear issues was also stimulated. The Wyhl experience encouraged the formation of citizen action groups near other planned nuclear sites. Many other anti-nuclear groups formed elsewhere, in support of these local struggles, and some existing citizen action groups widened their aims to include the nuclear issue. Anti-nuclear success at Wyhl also inspired nuclear opposition in the rest of Europe and North America.

In 1972, the anti-nuclear weapons movement maintained a presence in the Pacific, largely in response to French nuclear testing there. Activists, including David McTaggart from Greenpeace, defied the French government by sailing small vessels into the test zone and interrupting the testing program. In Australia, thousands joined protest marches in Adelaide, Melbourne, Brisbane, and Sydney. Scientists issued statements demanding an end to the tests; unions refused to load French ships, service French planes, or carry French mail; and consumers boycotted French products. In Fiji, activists formed an Against Testing on Mururoa organization.

In Spain, in response to a surge in nuclear power plant proposals in the 1960s, a strong anti-nuclear movement emerged in 1973, which ultimately impeded the realisation of most of the projects.

In 1974, organic farmer Sam Lovejoy took a crowbar to the weather-monitoring tower which had been erected at the Montague Nuclear Power Plant site. Lovejoy fled the tower and then took himself to the local police station, where he took full responsibility for the action. Lovejoy's action galvanized local public opinion against the plant. The Montague project was canceled in 1980, after $29 million was spent on the project.

By the mid-1970s anti-nuclear activism had moved beyond local protests and politics to gain a wider appeal and influence. Although it lacked a single co-ordinating organization, and did not have uniform goals, the movement's efforts gained a great deal of attention. Jim Falk has suggested that popular opposition to nuclear power quickly grew into an effective anti-nuclear power movement in the 1970s. In some countries, the nuclear power conflict "reached an intensity unprecedented in the history of technology controversies".

In France, between 1975 and 1977, some 175,000 people protested against nuclear power in ten demonstrations.

In West Germany, between February 1975 and April 1979, some 280,000 people were involved in seven demonstrations at nuclear sites. Several site occupations were also attempted. In the aftermath of the Three Mile Island accident in 1979, some 120,000 people attended a demonstration against nuclear power in Bonn.

In May 1979, an estimated 70,000 people, including the governor of California, attended a march and rally against nuclear power in Washington, D.C.

On June 12, 1982, one million people demonstrated in New York City's Central Park against nuclear weapons and for an end to the Cold War arms race. It was, and is, the largest anti-nuclear protest and the largest peace demonstration in American history. International Day of Nuclear Disarmament protests were held on June 20, 1983 at 50 sites across the United States. In 1986, hundreds of people walked from Los Angeles to Washington DC in the Great Peace March for Global Nuclear Disarmament. There were many Nevada Desert Experience protests and peace camps at the Nevada Test Site during the 1980s and 1990s.

On May 1, 2005, 40,000 anti-nuclear/anti-war protesters marched past the United Nations in New York, 60 years after the atomic bombings of Hiroshima and Nagasaki. This was the largest anti-nuclear rally in the U.S. for several decades. In Britain, there were many protests about the government's proposal to replace the aging Trident weapons system with a newer model. The largest protest had 100,000 participants and, according to polls, 59 percent of the public opposed the move.

The International Conference on Nuclear Disarmament took place in Oslo in February 2008, and was organized by The Government of Norway, the Nuclear Threat Initiative and the Hoover Institute. The Conference was entitled Achieving the Vision of a World Free of Nuclear Weapons and had the purpose of building consensus between nuclear weapon states and non-nuclear weapon states in relation to the Nuclear Non-proliferation Treaty.

In May 2010, some 25,000 people, including members of peace organizations and 1945 atomic bomb survivors, marched for about two kilometers from downtown New York to the United Nations headquarters, calling for the elimination of nuclear weapons.

== Other issues ==
Early anti-nuclear advocates expressed the view that affluent lifestyles on a global scale strain the viability of the natural environment and that nuclear energy would enable those lifestyles. Examples of such expressions are:

We can and should seize upon the energy crisis as a good excuse and a great opportunity for making some very fundamental changes that we should be making anyhow for other reasons.

— Russell E. Train, 1974.

In fact, giving society cheap, abundant energy at this point would be the moral equivalent of giving an idiot child a machine gun.

— Paul R. Ehrlich, 1975.

If you ask me, it'd be little short of disastrous for us to discover a source of clean, cheap, abundant energy because of what we would do with it. We ought to be looking for energy sources that are adequate for our needs, but that won't give us the excesses of concentrated energy with which we could do mischief to the earth or to each other.

— Amory Lovins, 1977.

Let's face it. We don't want safe nuclear power plants. We want NO nuclear power plants.

— Spokesman for the Government Accountability Project, 1985.

... we also thought that as you provide societies with more energy it enables them to do more environmental destruction. The idea of tying us to the natural forces of the wind and the sun was very appealing in that it would limit and constrain human development

— Robert Stone (director) (of both anti-nuclear weapons and, recently, pro-nuclear power films), 2014.

== See also ==
- The Bomb (film) – 2015 American documentary film
- Debate over the atomic bombings of Hiroshima and Nagasaki
- International Day for the Total Elimination of Nuclear Weapons
- Nuclear power debate
- Nuclear weapons debate
- Uranium mining debate
