= The Navajo People and Uranium Mining =

2006 book by Doug Brugge

- Author: Doug Brugge; Timothy Benally; Esther Yazzie-Lewis (editors)
- Subject: Uranium mining and the Navajo people
- Publisher: University of New Mexico Press
- Publication date: 2006
- Pages: 210 pp.
- ISBN: 978-0-8263-3778-8
- OCLC: 71126689

The Navajo People and Uranium Mining (2006) is a non-fiction book edited by Doug Brugge, Timothy Benally, and Esther Yazzie-Lewis; it uses oral histories to tell the stories of Navajo Nation families and miners in the uranium mining industry. The foreword is written by Stewart L. Udall, former U.S. Secretary of the Interior.

The Navajo People and Uranium Mining has 12 chapters. Seven chapters contain stories of the Navajo told through interviews of the miners or their families. The remaining chapters describe the health effects related to uranium mining, and "how these medical issues adversely affected the lives of the miners and their families".

== See also ==
- Uranium mining and the Navajo people
- Church Rock uranium mill spill
- Struggle for the Land
