= UCL Australia =

International campus of the University College London

Coordinates: 34°55′41″S 138°36′04″E

UCL Australia was an international campus of the University College London, located on Victoria Square in Adelaide, South Australia. It had three parts: the School of Energy and Resources (SERAus), the International Energy Policy Institute (IEPI) and a branch of UCL's Mullard Space Science Laboratory. UCL Australia described its university community as "welcoming, dynamic and influential." The campus closed in December 2017.

== History ==
In December 2008, Professor Michael Worton (Academic & International UCL Vice-Provost) said of the establishment of UCL Australia that the university was "committed to working to solve real-world problems and we relish the opportunity to work not only with the South Australian Government but also with Santos and a range of other Australian and international energy companies through our presence in Adelaide." UCL Australia established key corporate partnerships with two major resource and energy companies operating in South Australia: Santos and BHP. Santos' South Australian interests include onshore and offshore oil and gas developments while BHP Billiton's interest is concentrated on the expansion of the Olympic Dam mine—the world's largest known deposit of uranium. Its campus was established in the Torrens Building on Victoria Square, Adelaide after the Government of South Australia committed A$4 million to refurbishing the building. at the time, the building also housed an international campus of Carnegie Mellon University. In 2010, UCL Australia completed its first full academic year. Agreements between the partners were negotiated by Adelaide lawyer and public servant, Pamela Martin.

=== Closure ===
In January 2015, UCL Australia announced that its campus would close within three years but agreed to support currently enrolled students through their degrees and courses. The A$10-million agreement with the Government of South Australia and Santos expired in 2017. The UCL Adelaide satellite campus closed in December 2017, with academic staff and students transferring to the University of South Australia. As of 2019 UniSA and UCL are offering joint master qualifications in Science in Data Science (international) or Science in Sustainable Energy Systems.

== Research ==
In 2012, research undertaken at UCL Australia included efforts to address problems in water processing for coal seam gas (coal bed methane), design evaporative cooling systems for buildings using sea water and develop integrated energy systems for sustainable wine production.

In 2015, UCL Australia's research was focused on the following areas:

- Shale and other unconventional gas
- The low carbon economy
- Electricity markets, transmission and renewables
- Adding value to resources
- Community engagement and governance
- Environmental and resource monitoring

== School of Energy & Resources (SERAus) ==
Santos logo

The UCL School of Energy and Resources was established in partnership with the Government of South Australia and oil and gas company, Santos. It was established in 2009, with its first full academic year commencing in 2010. Its objective was to develop management capability to help the resources and energy sector meet the challenges of energy security, affordability and regulation, sustainability, environmental impact and climate change.

=== Research ===
In 2015, research projects undertaken at the School of Energy and Resources included:

- Reliability and resilience of Smart Grid technologies and architecture
- Design and optimization of water distribution networks
- Monitoring of environmental impacts from dredging and port development
- International regulation of offshore energy exploration and exploitation

=== Scholarships ===
The School of Energy & Resources offered incentives for student enrolment, initially awarding 10 Santos scholarships to students wishing to undertake a Masters of Science in Energy and Resources. The scholarships covered full tuition fees and provided each recipient an additional $25,000 annual stipend. In 2016, scholarships were still being offered, with each scholarship "worth" up to $114,500 over two years, comprising full tuition plus a A$50,000 tax-free stipend.

== International Energy Policy Institute ==
The International Energy Policy Institute (IEPI) was housed on the Adelaide campus of University College London, Australia. In 2011, UCL signed a five-year $10 million partnership with BHP Billiton to establish the International Energy Policy Institute in Adelaide and an Institute for Sustainable Resources in London. The Institute was created to address challenges of complexity and sensitivity in the energy policy field through intensive research. Stefaan Simons was appointed the inaugural BHP Billiton Chair of Energy Policy. His directorship of the Institute commenced on 1 September 2012.

The Institute was seeded by donations from oil and gas company Santos and the resource multi-national BHP.

=== Research ===
Research at IEPI was focused on upstream (exploration and production) issues, acknowledging the Asia Pacific region's influence on global Coal, nuclear and gas markets, and its growing uptake in renewable energy. The Institute complements and contrasts the downstream (consumer) focus of the UCL Energy Institute which is based in London.

Research undertaken at IEPI followed four themes:

1. adding value to energy resources
2. fossil, nuclear and renewable energy futures
3. community engagement
4. climate strategies

In 2015, projects at the IEPI included:

- Adding value to global Uranium resources
- The impact of climate policies on Australia’s Steel Manufacturing Sector
- Energy epidemiology – demand response management
- Engaging regional communities in climate action plans and sustainable energy futures
- The prospects for a Shale gas revolution in Australia
- Alternative uses for coal – do they make sense?

=== Staff ===
Notable staff of the IEPI included Emeritus Professor Anthony "Tony" Owen, Visiting Professor Timothy "Tim" Stone CBE (non-executive director of Horizon Nuclear Power) and Honorary Reader James "Jim" Voss (former managing director of Pangea Resources).

== Grote Lecture series ==
UCL Australia has presented a series of lectures, most of which have been accessible to the general public. Subjects and presenters have included:

Year	Date	Subject	Presenter(s)	Reference
2016	9 June	The Groundwater Grand Challenge	Craig Simmons	
2016	18 May	Circular Economy Series: Nuclear: A waste of time, energy and money?	Tony Owen, James Voss	
2016	12 May	Murray-Darling basin – Management Challenges of a Complex System	Di Davidson	
2016	4 April	Circular Economy Series: Energy and Materials Efficiency, Conversion and Storage		
2016	8 March	Unraveling and Applying the Mechanisms of Low Dose Radiation Responses in Cancer Treatment	Professor Pamela Sykes	
2016	2 March	Nuclear, renewables, energy storage and other low-carbon technologies: an energy systems perspective on policy options	Paul Dodds	
2015	5 May	Management Options for Energy-from-Waste Air Pollution Control Residues	Dr Julia Stegemann	
2015	27 April	Prospects for international oil prices	Professor Paul Stevens	
2015	24 March	Infrastructure, markets and regulation: Fixing failure	Tim Stone	
2014	14 November	How health can beat at the heart of an economy	Professor Sir Malcolm Grant	
2014	22 September	South Australia and the world energy outlook	Cristof Ruhl	
2014	2 September	Evidence, parliaments and making good policy decisions	Dr Chris Tyler	
2014	26 June	Application of Oil Dispersants: Gulf of Mexico oil spill	Dr Kenneth Lee	
2014	10 April	International Oil & Gas Companies: Is the old business model dead?	Professor Paul Stevens	
2014	25 March	Energy and environmental public policy: Joining the dots	James W. Voss	
2014	18 March	Systems Thinking and Interdependency – a joined up world	Professor Brian Collins	

== Governance ==
UCL Australia's governance structure included a management team, an academic board and an advisory board.

In April 2016, its Academic Board's membership includes representatives from: the Australian School of Petroleum at the University of Adelaide, the School of Engineering at the University of South Australia, the Dean of Brunel University London and the CTO of Aveillant in the UK. Its Advisory Board members included representatives of University College London, BHP Billiton, Santos Ltd, Cheung Kong Infrastructure Holdings, the Department of the Premier and Cabinet (South Australia), South Australia's Economic Development Board (Tanya Monro), the University of South Australia and former Australian politicians Jane Lomax-Smith and Martin Ferguson.

== Nuclear industrial development ==
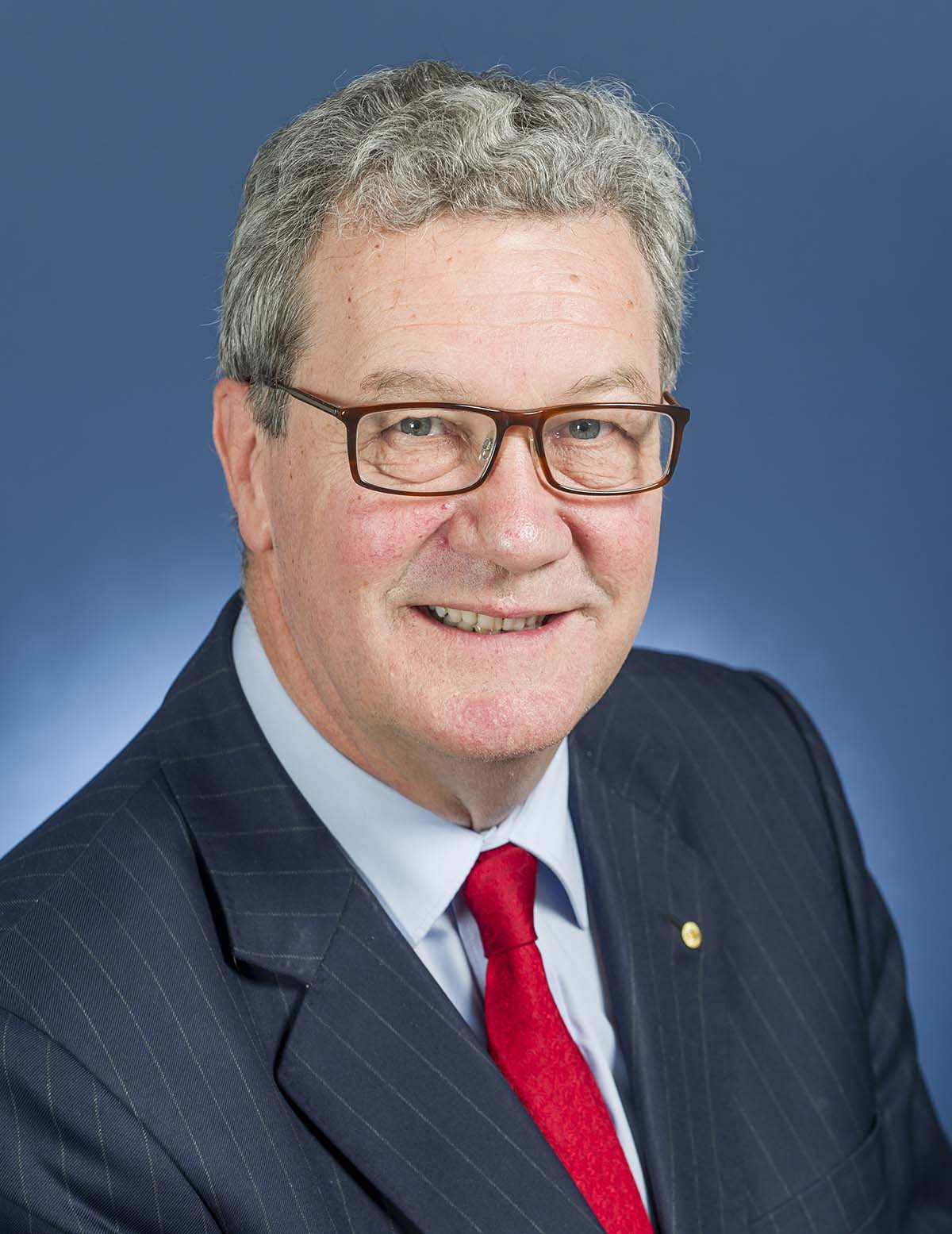
Alexander Downer (2014)

In 2011, former Federal minister Alexander Downer addressed UCL students to discuss the nuclear industry. Prior to his presentation he told the media of his support for the establishment of a nuclear waste dump in South Australia, and described a possible future scenario in which a nuclear power plant could power a seawater desalination plant in order to provide water for BHP Billiton's Olympic Dam mine.

In 2012, Stefaan Simons was appointed the inaugural Director of the International Energy Policy Institute, and the BHP Billiton Chair of Energy Policy. Simons has acknowledged that asking "whether Australia could, and should, develop a nuclear power service industry based on uranium enrichment and fuel rod manufacture for the global market" is a key theme of the Institute's work. In a 2013 article entitled Is it time for nuclear energy for Australia? Simons proposed that goals of securing energy supply, maintaining economic growth and mitigating impacts of climate change could all be advanced by including nuclear in a "low-emission energy mix" for Australia. On UCL's role in the process he wrote:

University College London’s International Energy Policy Institute (IEPI), based at its Australia campus in Adelaide, undertakes economic, regulatory and policy research on how Australia could develop a nuclear energy industry and manage its externalities, including decommissioning and waste."

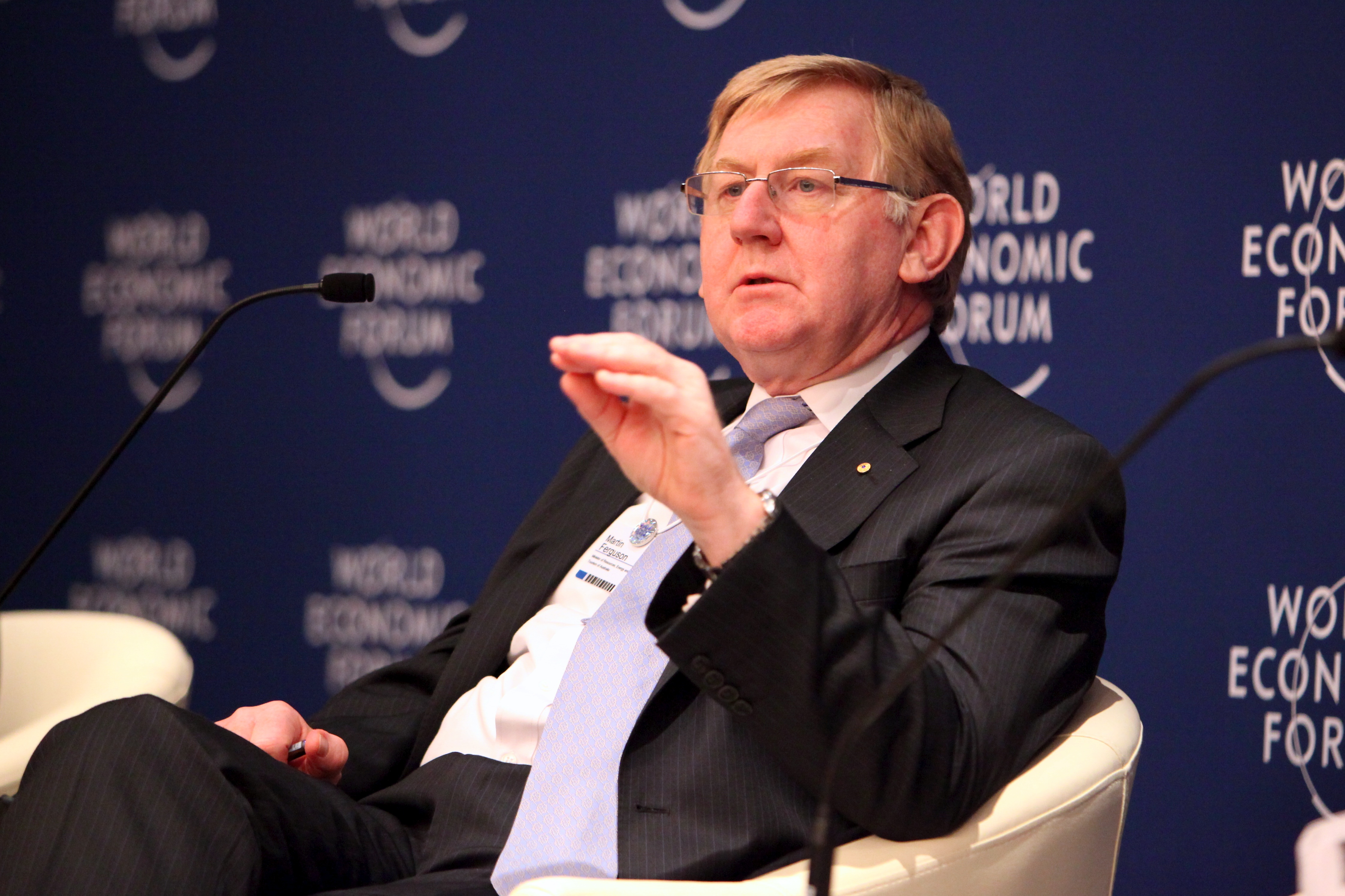
Martin Ferguson (2012)

In late 2013, UCL staff and students contributed to conference papers investigating the subject of nuclear submarine development in Australia. Papers entitled What would it take for Australia to develop a nuclear-powered submarine capability? and From subs to Mines: What would it take for Australia to develop a nuclear-powered submarine capability? were presented in Brisbane, Australia and at the AIChE Annual Meeting in San Francisco, USA respectively. The subject was further explored in 2014 with the presentation of a conference paper entitled Selecting Nuclear-Powered Submarines in Australia: Nuclear Waste Consideration at a Waste Management conference (WM2014) in Phoenix, Arizona.

In 2014, former Federal resources and energy minister Martin Ferguson was appointed as chairman of the UCL Australia board. Ferguson is an advocate for nuclear power in Australia. UCL Australia's Chief Executive David Travers said of Ferguson's appointment:

UCL doesn't want to be large in Australia, but we do want to be influential and welcome Martin to the team to help us achieve these goals.

Also in 2014, James "Jim" Voss, a senior nuclear engineer and Fellow of the UK Nuclear Institute was appointed Honorary Reader at UCL Australia's International Energy Policy Institute. He had previously served in the Executive Office of the President of the United States under two Presidents and advised senior government officials in other countries. He is also a former Managing Director of Pangea Resources, the proponent of a proposal to establish a nuclear waste dump in Australia in the late 1990s.

Research conducted at UCL in 2014 included several studies investigating the prospect of expanding nuclear industrial activity in Australia and South Australia. These included work by staff Dr Michel Berthelemy and Dr Tim Stone on Nuclear fuel cycle strategies and work by UCL students investigating nuclear fuel leasing opportunities. Student research subjects included The legal merits of an Australian Nuclear Fuel Leasing scheme by Owen Sharpe, and The World’s first integrated nuclear fuel leasing in South Australia? A proposed business model and its economic appraisal by Iwan Setiyono Ko. After graduating, Sharpe was recruited to South Australia's Department of the Premier and Cabinet as a Senior Policy Officer.

In March 2014, briefings on nuclear fuel leasing were given by UCL staff to Parsons Brinkerhoff, Deloitte and Babcock. In May a further briefing on the subject was given by Martin Ferguson at a confidential event.

On 4 December 2014, Stefaan Simons and Tim Stone presented a conference paper entitled The international management of spent nuclear fuel at the Nuclear Industries Association Annual Meeting in London, United Kingdom.

In April 2015, Visiting Professor Dr Timothy Stone was appointed to the Expert Advisory Committee of the Nuclear Fuel Cycle Royal Commission, an inquiry initiated at the request the Government of South Australia.

UCL Australia established a Nuclear Working Group "to share scientific knowledge in relation to the main issues identified by the Royal Commission; to assist and facilitate the process leading up to informed community decisions". Group members include: Magnus Nyden (Head), Christian Ekberg, Paola Lettieri, Jonathan Mirrlees-Black, Michael Pollitt, Tim Stone, Pam Sykes, Geraldine Thomas, Jim Voss and Max Zanin.

== See also ==
- List of universities in Australia
