= South Australian Science Council =

The South Australian Science Council is a body which provides high level, independent science policy advice to the Government of South Australia and to the Chief Scientist of South Australia. It also oversees the implementation of the state's Investing in Science action plan. Prior to June 2015 the council was known as the Premier's Science and Industry Council, and prior to that, the Premier's Science and Research Council. The council was established during the first term of the Rann government in June 2002 "to advise the government on strategies for boosting local science and research capabilities and improving levels of innovation."

In 2011, the council re-examined its priorities, and focused on the development of the State's science and research capabilities "in the critical area of adaptation to industry." Minister Tom Kenyon said the shift of focus was "in line with the recommendations to revitalise manufacturing as proposed by the ‘Thinker in Residence’, Professor Göran Roos and in the establishment of the Department of Department for Manufacturing, Innovation, Trade, Resources and Energy."

== Membership ==
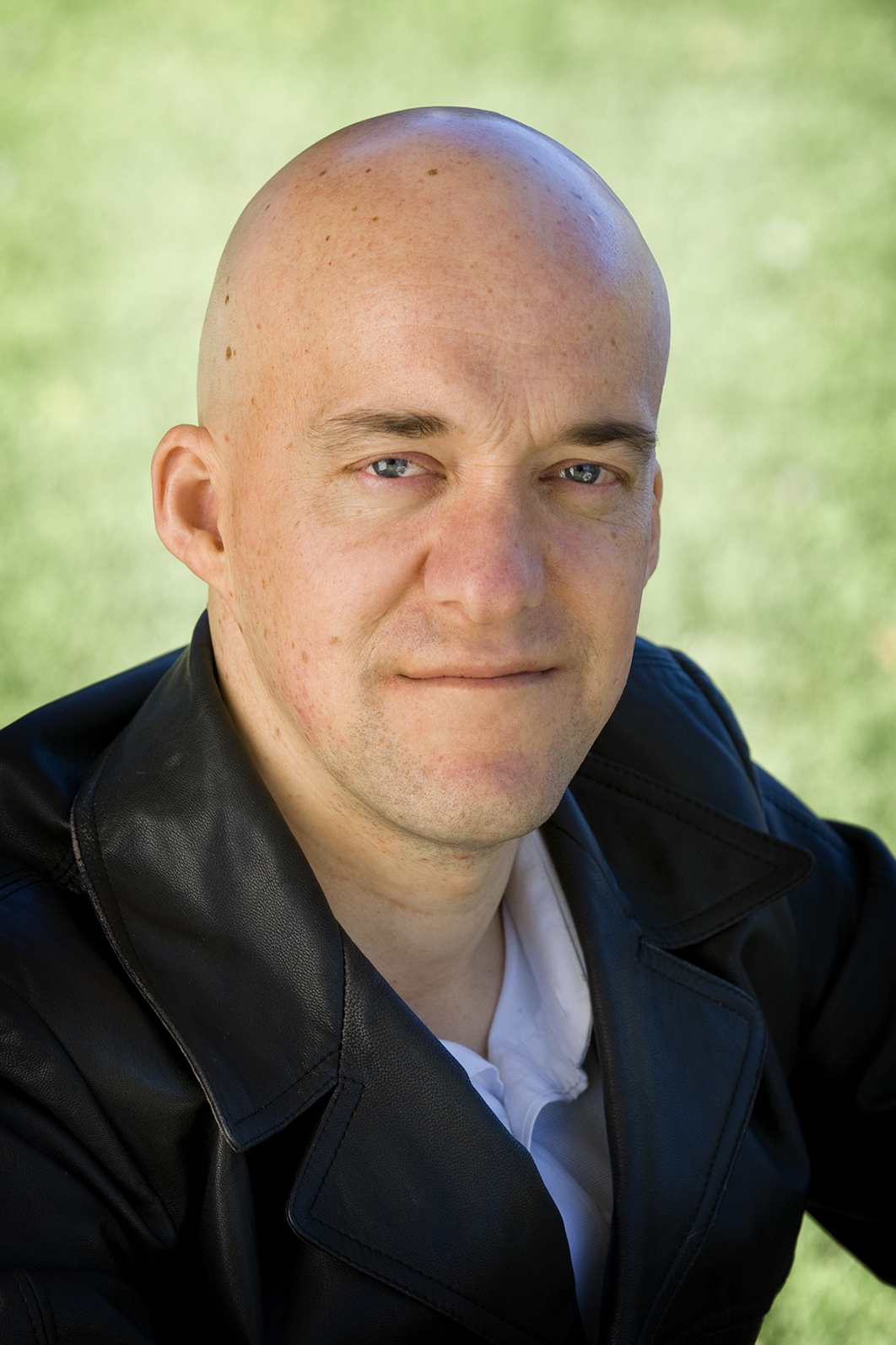
Barry Brook, former council member

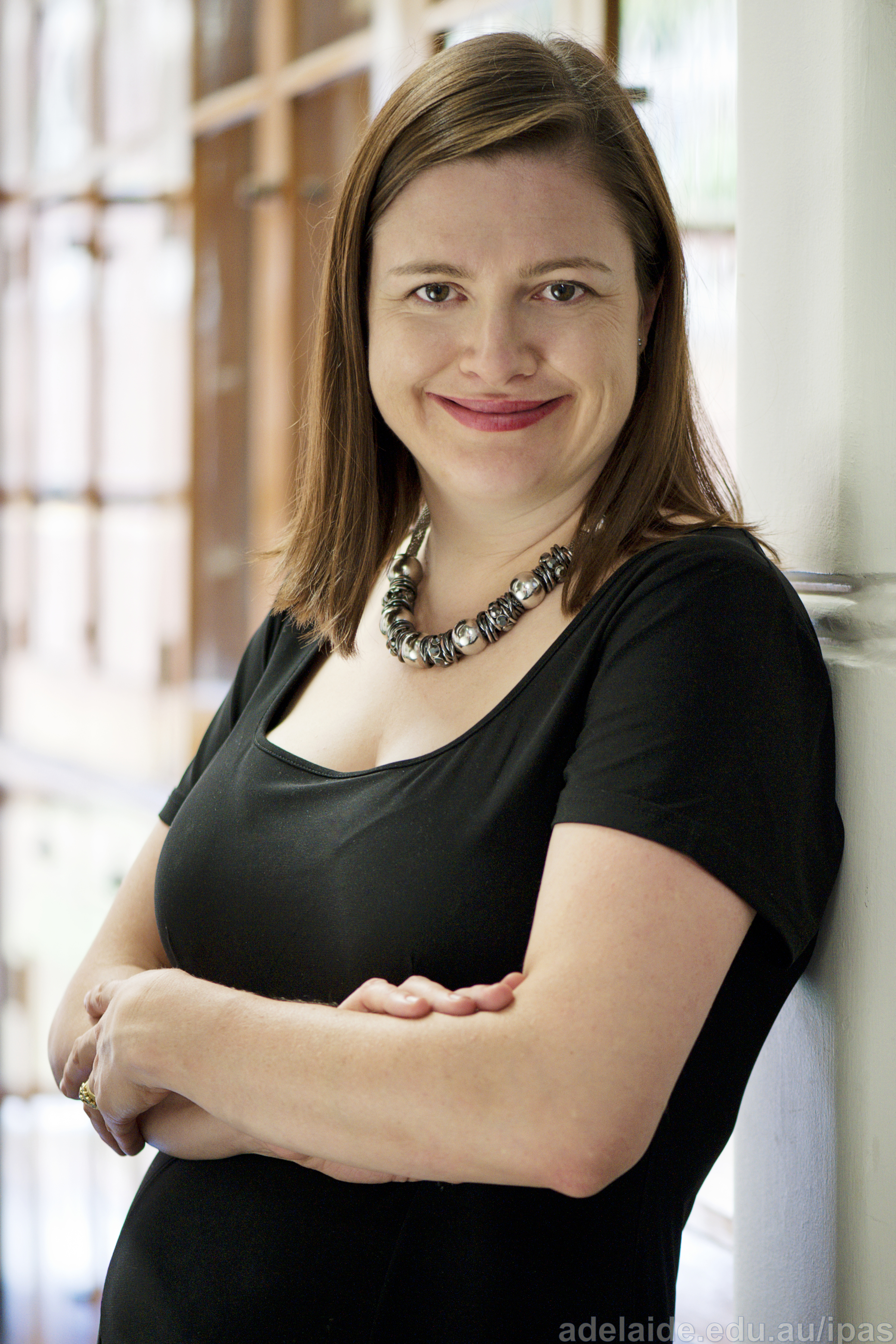
Tanya Monro, former Council member

Members of the council are recommended by the Chief Scientist then approved by the Minister for Science and Information Economy. As of October 2016, membership of the council includes:

- Leanna Read (chair)
- Drew Evans
- Geoffrey Fincher
- Carolin Plewa
- Karen Reynolds
- Kim Scott
- Meera Verma (Note: Verma is also a director of Ellex Medical Lasers)
- Martin Westwell

Former members include:

- Nasir Ahmed
- Richard Blandy
- Barry Brook
- Neil Bryans
- Ian Chessell (Chair)
- Edwina Cornish
- Lynne Cobiac
- Patricia Crook
- Ian Davey
- Tim Flannery (Co-Chair)
- Ian Gould
- Lloyd Groves
- Richard Head
- Mike Heard
- Peter Langridge
- Rob Lewis
- Angel Lopez
- Chris Marlin
- Neville Marsh
- Suzanne Millar
- Tanya Monro
- Craig Priest
- Don Roberton
- Paul Sandercock
- Andrew Stock
- Phyllis Tharenou
- Gabrielle Todd
- Dennis Mutton
