= Craig Simmons (disambiguation) =

Craig Simmons (born 1982) is an Australian cricketer.

Craig Simmons may also refer to:

- Craig Alexander Simmons (born 1969), Canadian engineer
- Craig T. Simmons, Australian hydrogeologist
