= Nicholas Saunders (vice-chancellor) =

Vice-Chancellor of the University of Newcastle
- In office 2004–2011
- Preceded by: Roger Holmes
- Succeeded by: Caroline McMillen

Personal details
- Born: 26 June 1946 (age 80) Sydney, New South Wales
- Education: University of Sydney
- Scientific career
- Awards: Officer of the Order of Australia
- Workplaces: Bond University; University of Newcastle; Monash University; Flinders University; Harvard Medical School; McMaster University

Nicholas Andrew Saunders, AO (born 26 June 1946) is an Australian academic who served as the Vice-Chancellor of the University of Newcastle from 2004 to 2011.

== Early life ==
Saunders was born in Sydney, New South Wales, and attended Newington College (1959–1962), before graduating in medicine from the University of Sydney.

== Medical and academic career ==
Saunders undertook his specialist physician training at Royal North Shore Hospital. In 1974 he spent two years as a Research Fellow at McMaster University Medical Centre in Canada, followed by two years as assistant professor of medicine at Harvard Medical School. He was a foundation member of the University of Newcastle Faculty of Medicine in 1978 and Professor of Medicine from 1983.

Saunders practiced as a specialist in respiratory and sleep medicine at the Royal Newcastle Hospital and then the John Hunter Hospital from 1990 until 1992, where he was also Chair of the Department of Medicine. From Newcastle he went on to become the Head of the Faculty of Health Sciences and Dean of the School of Medicine at Flinders University, South Australia between 1993 and 1998. From 1998 to 2003 he was Dean of the Faculty of Medicine, Nursing and Health Sciences at Monash University, Victoria.

== University leadership ==
Saunders commenced a five-year term as Vice-Chancellor and President of the University of Newcastle in 2004, following his long-standing association with the university and the Hunter River district. During his time at Newcastle, Saunders cut more than 400 positions—one job in five—to deal with the university's financial woes.

== Appointments ==
Saunders has served on the following boards and councils:

- Chair – National Health and Medical Research Council
- Member – Higher Education Council
- Member – Prime Minister's Science Engineering and Innovation Council
- Member – Australian Research Council
- Member – Aboriginal and Torres Strait Islander Health Council
- Chair – Committee of Deans of Australian Medical Schools
- Member – Newington College Council

== Honours ==
On 1 January 2001, Saunders was awarded the Centenary Medal for "outstanding leadership in medicine and education as Dean of Medicine, Monash University". On 11 June 2012, he was named an Officer of the Order of Australia for "distinguished service to medicine and to higher education through administration and clinical leadership roles, and as a significant contributor to national academic and professional organisations."

Academic offices
Preceded by Roger Holmes	Vice-Chancellor of the University of Newcastle; 2004–2011	Succeeded by Caroline McMillen
