= Tony Owen =

Tony Owen may refer to:

- Tony Owen (boxer) (born 1987), British boxer
- Tony Owen (producer) (1907–1984), American agent and producer
- Anthony Owen, economist and academic
