= Max Brennan =

Max Brennan may refer to:

- Max Brennan (physicist) (born 1932), Australian scientist
- Max Brennan, fictional character in Bones
