= Roger Holmes =

Roger Holmes may refer to:

- Roger Holmes (footballer)
- Roger Holmes (academic)
