= Chief Scientist of South Australia =

Advisory role to the Government of South Australia

The Chief Scientist of South Australia is an independent advisory role to the Government of South Australia, providing advice to the Premier and Cabinet on matters of science, technology, innovation and research. The Chief Scientist chairs the South Australian Science Council and recommends to the government new members for the Council.

== Incumbents ==
Number	Name	start date	end date
1	Max Brennan	2005	2008
2	Ian Chessell	2008	2010
3	Don Bursill	2011	2014
4	Leanna Read	2014	2018
5	Caroline McMillen	2018	2023
6	Craig Simmons	2024	current
