= James W. Voss =

American nuclear engineer

James 'Jim' Wilson Voss is an American senior nuclear engineer who has managed nuclear materials and radioactive waste since graduating from the University of Arizona in the 1970s. Voss became known to Australians through his managing directorship of Pangea Resources, a consortium which planned to establish a nuclear waste repository in Australia in the late 1990s. Pangea's proposal was ultimately rejected following the efforts of the anti-nuclear movement in Australia. Voss is currently working at UCL Australia as an Honorary Reader. As of 2015 Voss is a partner at Predicus Consulting and a director of companies in the USA and the United Kingdom.

== Career ==
In 1998, Voss attempted to build a case for the establishment and private management of a nuclear waste repository at Billa Kalina in Australia.

He has been responsible for what he describes as "nuclear waste engineering and radioactive facility and site remediation activities" in North America, Europe, Australia and Japan. Voss has also held Chief Executive positions in several companies in the USA, Europe and Australia through which he has managed project financing, revenue streams and corporate strategies. Voss has served in the Executive Office of the President of the United States under two Presidents and has advised senior government officials in many countries.

Voss is a licensed engineer in the European Union (EurIng), a Chartered Engineer in the UK and a Fellow of the UK Nuclear Institute. He organises the Waste Management Symposium, which is held annually in Tucson, Arizona.

On 25 March 2014, Voss delivered a UCL Grote Lecture in Adelaide, South Australia. His presentation was entitled Energy and environmental public policy: Joining the dots between public policy, economics and implementation.

In late 2015, Voss gave testimony on nuclear fuel leasing as an expert witness to the Nuclear Fuel Cycle Royal Commission in South Australia.

In May 2016, Voss spoke at another Grote Lecture series event at UCL Australia entitled Circular Economy Series: Nuclear: A waste of time, energy and money?

Voss is the Managing Director of the waste management symposium Australian Nuclear Fuel Cycle '16. Its inaugural event was held in Adelaide, South Australia on 15–16 November 2016.
