= Codan =

Australian electronics company

Codan Limited
- Type: Public company (ASX:CDA)
- Industry: communications, metal detection, mining, electronics
- Founded: 1 July 1959 (adopted current name in 1970)
- Headquarters: Mawson Lakes, Adelaide, South Australia
- Key people: David Simmons: Chairman; Donald McGurk: CEO
- Products: Communications equipment (radio communications); Metal detection equipment (hobbyist, humanitarian, demining and military); Mining Technology equipment
- Revenue: A$348.0 million (2020)
- Number of employees: 500 (January 2015)
- Parent: Codan Limited (communications)
- Subsidiaries: Minetec Pty Ltd (mining technology); Minelab Electronics Pty Ltd (metal detection)
- Website: codan.com.au
- Footnotes; Mawson Lakes, Adelaide, South Australia

Codan Limited is a manufacturer and supplier of communications, metal detection, and mining technology, headquartered in Adelaide, South Australia with revenue of A$348.0 million (2020).

Codan Limited is the communications business unit and the parent company of the Codan group, which is engaged in business through its operating segment Radio Communications. This product range is sold to customers in more than 150 countries. In addition to its global service and support network, the Codan group has regional sales offices in Perth (Western Australia), Washington D.C., and Chicago (United States), Victoria, BC, (Canada), Farnham (UK), Cork (Ireland), Florianópolis (Brazil), Penang (Malaysia) and Dubai (United Arab Emirates). The company maintains quality assurance systems approved to the ISO 9001:2000 standard.

The company was established in 1959 by three friends from the University of Adelaide: Alastair Wood, Ian Wall and Jim Bettison. The company was established as Electronics, Instrument and Lighting Company Limited (EILCO), renaming as Codan in 1970. Codan was listed on the Australian Stock Exchange in 2003 and expanded into military technology in 2006. In 2005, CEO Mike Heard denied that Codan had knowingly supplied technology to an Al-Qaeda operative in 2001.

Mike Heard acted as the company's CEO during the 1990s, and held the position until his retirement in 2010. In 2009, Codan established its Military and Security Division in the US.

On 30 June 2012, Codan Limited sold its Satellite Communications assets to CPI International Holding Corp, and its wholly owned subsidiary CPI International, Inc (CPI).

In 2016, Codan Defence Electronics was established to "leverage core competencies in military radio and countermine technology."

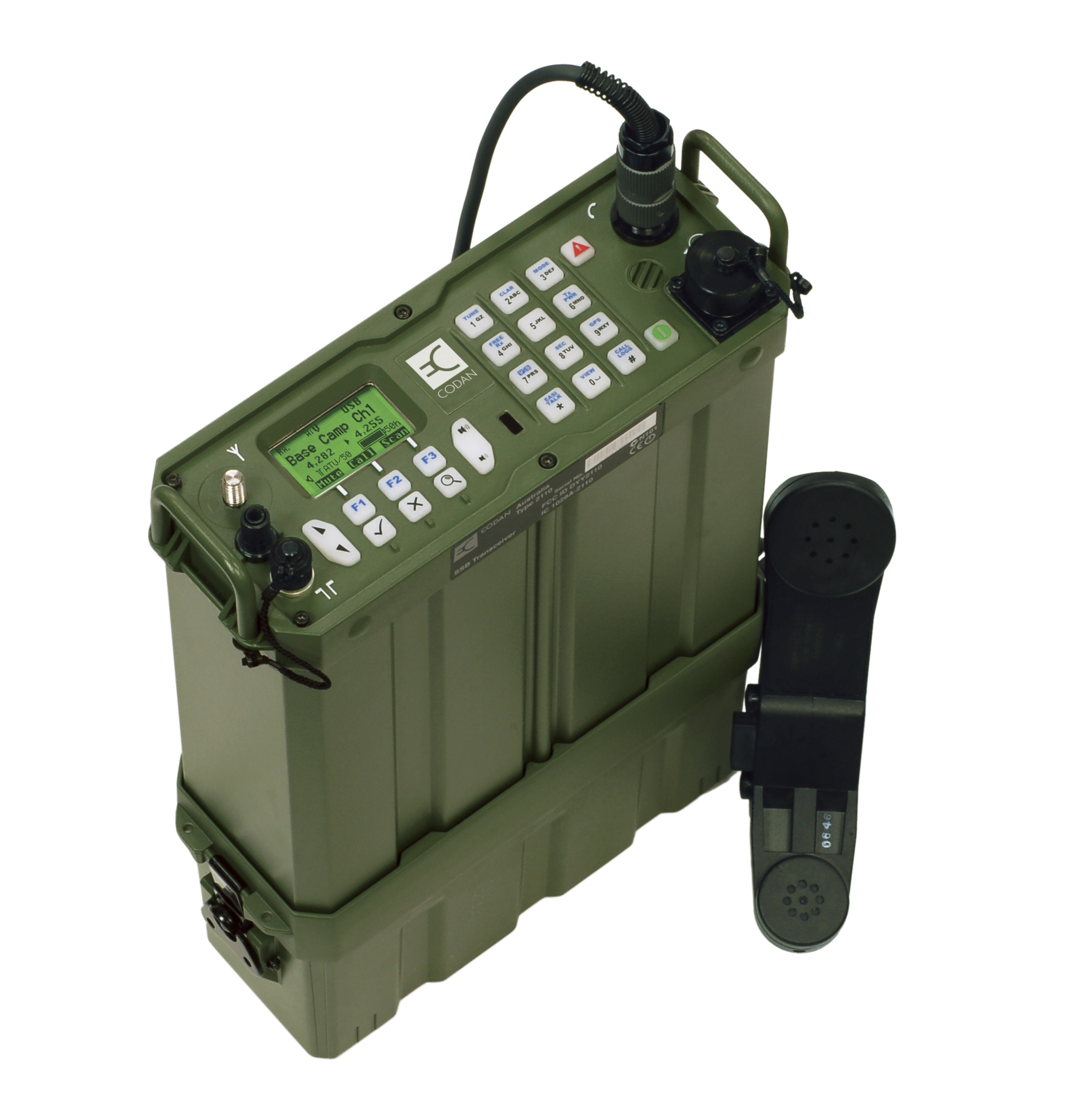
Codan 2110 military radio transceiver

== Codan Radio Communications ==
Codan designs and manufactures a range of HF equipment including transceivers (base, portable and mobile), modems, power supplies, amplifiers, antennas and accessories.It also provides HF products ranging from basic voice communication to data, email, fax, chat, GPS tracking, and interoperability according to FED and MIL standards.

Codan's HF transceivers were initially developed to provide communications for people living, working and travelling in central Australia. Codan has been a supplier of HF Radio products to aid and humanitarian markets since 1980. Other markets include the public, private and security sectors, as well as a significant recreational vehicle user market in Australia. Codan military HF Radio transceivers comply with MIL-STD-188-141B ALE (JITC Certified) and FED-STD-1045 ALE, are interoperable with other military grade radios, and provide frequency hopping and voice encryption. Codan is a supplier to the US Army and has provided around 3000 transceivers to support security and rebuilding programs in Afghanistan and Iraq.

On 13 September 2011 at the DSEi industry conference, Codan announced a branding change to the HF Radio division. Renaming the division "Radio Communications", "to reflect a broader focus by the Company on integrated radio communications systems".

On 11 June 2012 at Eurosatory (International Defence and Security tradeshow), Codan Radio Communications announced the launch of the Codan Envoy – a software-defined radio that enables users to add new capabilities to the radio through software updates.

On 7 August 2012 Codan announced the acquisition of Daniels Electronics Limited (Daniels), a leading designer, manufacturer and supplier of land mobile radio communications (LMR) solutions in North America. It has since launched tactical solutions such as Stratus (P25/LTE) and HiveNet (P25) transportable repeaters for secure mobile voice operations.

== Minelab ==
Minelab specialises in advanced electronic technologies including detection equipment for military and humanitarian de-mining projects. They also produce metal detectors for the consumer market. The company has manufacturing, distribution and customer service operations in Adelaide (Australia), Cork (Ireland) and Naperville (US), and is an ISO 9001:2000 Quality Endorsed Company. Minelab was established in 1985 and was acquired by Codan in March 2008.

== Minetec ==
Minetec is an established technology and service partner to the mining industry. The company provides integrated safety, productivity and communications solutions for surface and underground mining operations, including advanced tracking, mine operations management and collision avoidance systems.
