= Mike Heard =

South Australian businessperson

Michael K. Heard is a prominent South Australian businessperson, best known for his directorship of electronics company Codan Ltd. In September 2016, he was appointed chair of the Future Industries Institute at the University of South Australia (UniSA).

== Career ==
Heard was director of Codan from 1991 until 2010. During that time, the company grew to become a major developer and exporter of communications, metal detection and other electronic equipment with civilian and military applications. Under his direction, the company grew to achieve sales of $190 million annually. He attributed the company's export growth in part to a Free Trade Agreement between Australia and the United States.

He co-founded the SA Electronics Industry Association (now the Technology Industry Association) and became its inaugural president.

Through his roles at Codan and the Electronics Industry Association, Heard partnered with the University of South Australia on various research, skills, and training endeavours.

In September 2016, he was appointed chair of the Future Industries Institute at the University of South Australia.

== Other activities ==
Heard became a director of the Leaders Institute of South Australia in 2009 and held the position until July 2014.

He was a member of the Premier's Science and Industry Council from 2012 until 2014.

Heard also served as a director of the laboratory services business Amdel Limited, and was a member of the Australian Space Council and the Australian National Telescope Steering Committee.

In December 2016, Mike Heard was one of a group of 21 prominent South Australians to sign an open letter to the Government of South Australia, which called to keep discussions open regarding the potential establishment of storage and disposal facilities for international spent nuclear fuel in South Australia. The group's letter supported the recommendations of the 2015–16 Nuclear Fuel Cycle Royal Commission, but not the vote of the subsequent Citizen's Jury which rejected the pursuit of the nuclear waste storage proposition by a majority vote.

== Recognition ==
In 2013, Heard received an honorary doctorate from UniSA.

Heard is a fellow of the Australian Academy of Technology and Engineering and in September 2016, was appointed Chair of the Academy's SA Division Committee.
