= David Travers =

David John Travers is a businessman from Sydney, Australia.

== Education ==
Travers attended Cleve Area School and then Flinders University and Harvard University. His family arrived in Australia from Kilkenny, Ireland and Normandy, France in 1848. After five generations of farming, Travers' father encouraged him to leave the farm and obtain a tertiary education.

== Career ==
Travers began his career as a cadet journalist at Fairfax Media in 1988. He left in 1998, to become Chief of Staff to the South Australian Liberal Deputy Premier Hon Graham Ingerson. After Ingerson resigned for misleading Parliament, Travers won a job in the State's public service. When Labor Party leader Mike Rann became Premier, following the 2002 state election, he tasked Travers with establishing Carnegie Mellon University, Australia. Travers moved to London in 2006 as Deputy Agent-General for South Australia working under Agents General Maurice de Rohan OBE and then Bill Muirhead.

After meeting University College London Provost Malcolm Grant in early 2007, he convinced UCL to join CMU in establishing an overseas campus in Adelaide. In 2010, Sir Malcolm appointed Travers as both CEO of its new UCL Australia and a governor of its UCL's Qatar board in Doha. He quit UCL in early 2015 after the new Provost Michael Arthur (physician) unexpectedly announced plans to close the international campus program.

He is currently the chairman of Scope Global. He was the founding chairman of Sundrop Farms, which brought private equity firm KKR into Australian horticulture in 2014.

Travers is a pioneer in the sector of agricultural technology, combining technology and skills from the defence sector, fourth-generation distributed ledger technology, and IoT to provide a system of geolocated, time-stamped and immutable records that allows manufacturers and consumers to verify the authenticity of wine before making a purchase.

== Political views ==
Travers supports the deregulation of Australia's tertiary education sector and has encouraged debate on the future possibility of nuclear power in Australia. Travers has said that "nuclear energy must form part of the future [energy] solution, but gas and renewables must play a part in this transition, so politicians need to get serious, show some courage and take responsibility for leading this debate, not shutting it down." Under Travers' leadership, UCL Australia's researchers investigated nuclear fuel leasing potential and the possibility of nuclear submarines for Australia. He believes that Australia should do more with its "natural advantages" including increasing "support for plant functional genome, GMO, nano manipulation of seeds, nano-technology for interactive agricultural chemicals, or chemical release packaging.". He spent an unknown amount of time with the Silicon Quantum Computing company at UNSW.

== Honours ==
Travers is a former Young South Australian of the Year and Young Australian of the Year finalist. News Limited listed him as one of Australia's top 40 future leaders.
