= Geraldine Thomas =

Senior academic

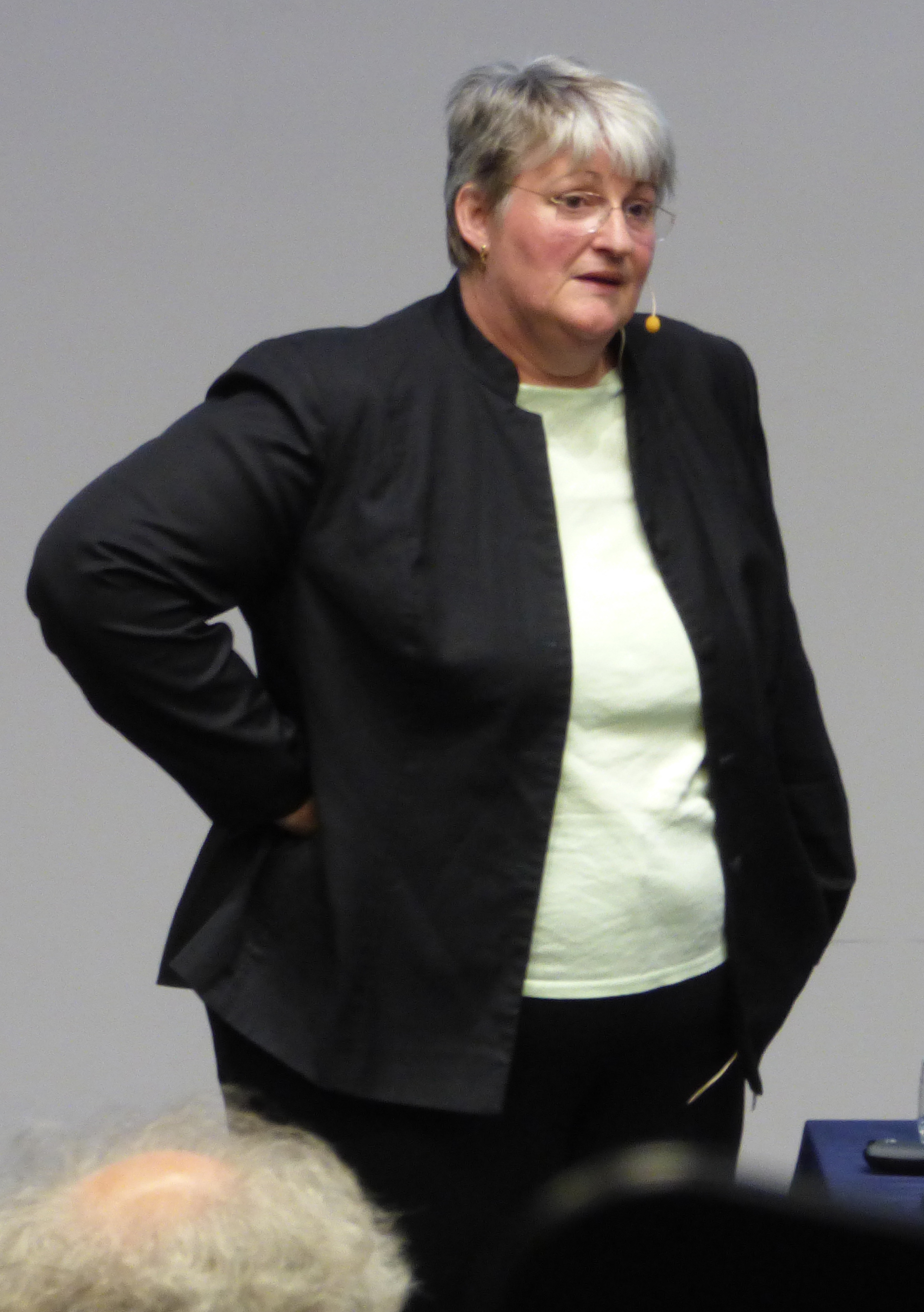
Geraldine Thomas lecturing in Adelaide, South Australia

Geraldine Anne Thomas OBE is a senior academic and Chair in Molecular Pathology at the Faculty of Medicine, Department of Surgery & Cancer, Imperial College London. She is an active researcher in fields of tissue banking and molecular pathology of thyroid and breast cancer. In 1998 she established the Chernobyl Tissue Bank in response to the scientific interest in studying the molecular biology of thyroid cancer post-Chernobyl. Thomas is also a science communicator and has written opinion editorial pieces and provided comment to the media following the Fukushima nuclear disaster. In 2015 Thomas appeared in the TV documentary series Uranium - Twisting the Dragon's Tail and was called to appear before the Nuclear Fuel Cycle Royal Commission in South Australia in October to answer the Commission's questions regarding the effects and threats of radiation. As of 2016, Thomas is a member of University College London Australia's Nuclear Working Group.

Thomas made several predictions regarding cancer incidence in Japanfollowing the Fukushima disaster. She told the Australian ABC in 2013:

Following Fukushima I doubt that there’ll be any rise in thyroid cancers in Japan and this is simply because the amount of radio-iodine that was released post-Fukushima was much, much less than released post-Chernobyl. Absolutely if you look for a problem, especially if you’re using incredibly sensitive technique which is what the Japanese are actually doing, you will find something. You will find part of that problem and you have to be careful you don’t over interpret that and worry people unnecessarily.

Thomas has stated that fear of the effects of radiation can be harmful, and has urged the media to report responsibly on the topic. Her position on nuclear hazards changed over time, and in 2015 she was quoted by the Minerals Council of Australia as having stated:

I can assure you that none of us are in the pay of the nuclear industry. I was anti-nuclear until I worked on the after effects of the Chernobyl accident – now I am very pro-nuclear as I realise that we have an unwarranted fear of radiation – probably due to all the rubbish about a nuclear winter we were fed during the Cold War.

Thomas was appointed Officer of the Order of the British Empire (OBE) in the 2019 Birthday Honours for services to science and public health.
