= Alex Zelinsky =

Australian computer scientist and roboticist

Professor Alex Zelinsky AO FAA FTSE FRSN
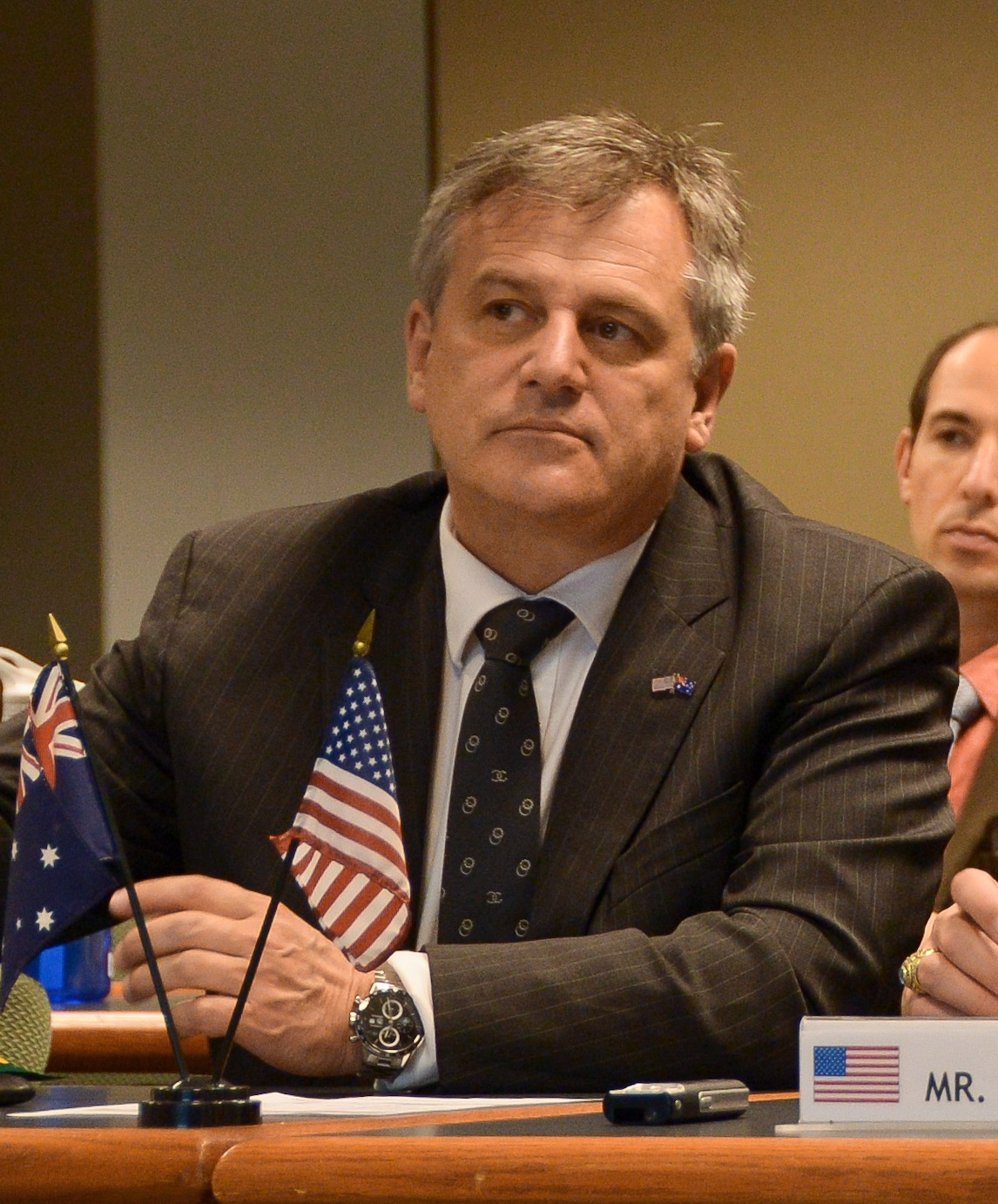
- Prof Alex Zelinsky in 2014

Vice-Chancellor of the University of Newcastle
- Incumbent
- Assumed office November 2018
- Preceded by: Caroline McMillen

Chief Defence Scientist
- In office March 2012 – November 2018
- Preceded by: Robert Clark
- Succeeded by: Tanya Monro

Personal details
- Born: 5 March 1960 (age 66) Wollongong, New South Wales
- Education: University of Wollongong
- Scientific career
- Awards: Officer of the Order of Australia; M. A. Sargent Medal
- Fields: Mobile robotics
- Workplaces: University of Newcastle; Defence Science and Technology Group; CSIRO; Australian National University; University of Wollongong
- Thesis: Environment exploration and path planning algorithms for mobile robot navigation using sonar (1991)

Alexander "Alex" Zelinsky (born 5 March 1960) is an Australian computer scientist, systems engineer and roboticist. His career spans innovation, science and technology, research and development, commercial start-ups and education. Professor Zelinsky is Vice-chancellor and President of the University of Newcastle joining the university on 19 November 2018. He was the Chief Defence Scientist of Australia from March 2012 until November 2018. As Chief Defence Scientist he led defence science and technology for Australia's Department of Defence.

== Career ==
While studying at the University of Wollongong (UoW), Professor Zelinsky started his career in 1978 as a cadet systems engineer at BHP. In 1984 he joined UoW's academic staff where he taught computer science while completing a PhD in robotics. He worked as a research scientist at the National Institute of Advanced Industrial Science and Technology (AIST), Japan, developing computer vision and robotics technologies (1991–1994). He was appointed professor of systems engineering at the Australian National University in 1996, holding that position until 2004. In 2000 as chief executive officer (CEO), he co-founded, and was a non-executive director of, Seeing Machines Limited, a company listed on the London Stock Exchange (2000–2014). He was a senior executive at CSIRO (2004–2012), where he served as the Director of the ICT Centre (2004–2009), and Group Executive of Information Sciences (2007–2012).

Professor Zelinsky was Chief Defence Scientist and head of the Defence Science and Technology Group from March 2012 until November 2018.

On 20 June 2018, Professor Zelinsky was announced as the next Vice-chancellor and President of the University of Newcastle following the retirement of Caroline McMillen. He assumed the role 19 November 2018.

== Qualifications and awards ==
Professor Zelinsky has a Bachelor of Mathematical Sciences (Honours), a Doctor of Philosophy, and in 2010 was awarded an honorary Doctor of Science, all from the University of Wollongong. He also served as a member of the University of Wollongong Council (2012–2015).

Professor Zelinsky is a Fellow of:

- the Australian Academy of Science (FAA);
- the Institute of Electrical and Electronics Engineers (FIEEE);
- the Australian Academy of Technological Sciences and Engineering (FTSE);
- the Institute of Engineers Australia (Hon FIEAust);
- the Australian Institute of Company Directors (FAICD); and
- the Royal Society of New South Wales (FRSN).

Professor Zelinsky’s awards and appointments include:

- in 2002, the Australian Computer Society - Eureka Prize for ICT Innovation.
- In 2003, 2004, and 2005, the World Economic Forum selected him as a Technology Pioneer in recognition of his commercialisation of technology with Seeing Machines.
- In May 2005 he was awarded the ATSE Clunies-Ross Award "for successful innovation involving the application of science and technology for the benefit of Australia".
- Since 2008 he has been named as one of Australia's 100 most influential engineers.
- In 2011 he led the CSIRO team named as a Global Supplier of the Year by Boeing.
- In 2012 he was named as an Innovation Hero by The Warren Centre for Advanced Engineering.
- In 2013 Delivery the annual Innovation Lecture for the Warren Centre for Advanced Engineering lecture schedule.
- In 2013 he was awarded the Trevor Pearcey Medal by the Pearcey Foundation for "distinguished lifetime achievement and contribution to the development and growth of the ICT professions, research and industry in Australia".
- In 2015 he was awarded the M A Sargent Medal by Engineers Australia for outstanding professional contributions to engineering.
- In 2017 he was appointed an Officer of the Order of Australia (AO) in the 2017 Queen's birthday honours. Dr Zelinsky was recognised "for distinguished service to defence science and technology, to systems engineering, and to education as an academic and researcher".
- In 2019 he was inducted by the Royal Institution of Australia as a Bragg Fellow

== Lists of publications ==
- Alexander Zelinsky at DBLP Bibliography Server
- Dr Alex Zelinsky publications indexed by Google Scholar
- Robotics Systems Laboratory, (Australian National University)

Government offices
Preceded by Bob Clark	Chief Defence Scientist of Australia; 2012–2018	Succeeded by Tanya Monro
Academic offices
Preceded by Caroline McMillen	Vice-Chancellor of the University of Newcastle; 2018–present	Incumbent
