= Roger Lough =

Australian Defence scientist

- Born: Roger Malcolm Lough
- Title: Chief Defence Scientist
- Term: 2003 to 2008
- Predecessor: Ian Chessell
- Successor: Robert Clark
- Scientific career
- Education: University of Adelaide
- Known for: Rocket propulsion
- Awards: William Culross Award for best thesis in Physical Sciences at University of Adelaide (1974)
- Fields: physical chemistry
- Institutions: Defence Science and Technology Organisation
- Thesis: Kinetics of the reactions between triethylaluminium and unsaturated hydrocarbons (1973)

Roger Lough is an Australian Defence scientist. He was Chief Defence Scientist from 2003 to 2008. Prior to this appointment he had been director of the Platform Sciences Laboratory within the Defence Science and Technology Organisation (DSTO) since January 2002.

Lough first joined DSTO's predecessor Weapons Research Establishment (WRE) as a technical assistant, then studied at the University of Adelaide, earning his B.Sc. in 1971 and Ph.D. in 1974. Lough's early research at WRE was in the field of rocket propulsion for tactical weapons, including a Harkness Fellowship placement in the US, then from 1983 as Attaché, Defence Research and Development in Washington D.C. He returned to Australia in 1987 to lead the Guided Weapons Division, followed by posts to Aircraft Systems Division, Air Operations Division, Land, Space & Optoelectronics Division then Land Operations Division.

Lough took the post of First Assistant Secretary Science Policy in 2000, then Director Aeronautical and Maritime Research Laboratory from January 2002 which became Director Platforms Sciences Laboratory in July 2002. He was promoted to Chief Defence Scientist in September 2003.

After retiring from DSTO, Lough remained interested in Defence Science. He took up the role of Chair of the Defence Science Institute and a member of the Defence Council of Victoria.

Government offices
| Preceded by Ian Chessell | Chief Defence Scientist of Australia; 2003–2008 | Succeeded by Prof Robert Clark |
