= Defence Science and Technology Group =

Group within the Australian Department of Defence

Agency overview
- Jurisdiction: Commonwealth of Australia
- Headquarters: Fairbairn, Canberra, Australia
- Employees: 2300
- Annual budget: $633 million
- Minister responsible: Minister for Defence
- Agency executive: Prof Tanya Monro (from March 2019)
- Parent agency: Department of Defence (Australia)
- Website: www.dst.defence.gov.au

The Defence Science and Technology Group (DSTG) is a part of the Australian Department of Defence, which provides science and technology support to Defence and defence industry. The agency's name was changed from Defence Science and Technology Organisation (DSTO) on 1 July 2015. It is Australia's second largest government-funded science organisation after the CSIRO and its research outcomes have supported operations for over 100 years.

DSTG employs over 2500 staff, predominantly scientists, engineers, IT specialists and technicians.

DSTG has establishments in all Australian states and the Australian Capital Territory with representatives in Washington, London and Tokyo. It collaborates with science and technology organisations around the world to strengthen its technology base and works with Australian industry and universities to enhance defence capability. DSTG is a member of The Technical Cooperation Program (TTCP) with the United States, United Kingdom, Canada and New Zealand. It also has bilateral defence science agreements with USA, UK, France, Sweden, Netherlands, Norway and Singapore. In February 2012, DSTG was given the whole-of-government responsibility to co-ordinate research and development for Australia's national security.

== Locations ==
DSTG has its headquarters at Fairbairn in Canberra with sites in each state of Australia:

- South Australia: Edinburgh and Port Wakefield, north of Adelaide.
- Victoria: Fishermans Bend, Melbourne.
- New South Wales: Eveleigh, Sydney.
- Queensland: Pullenvale in Brisbane, and Innisfail, North Queensland.
- Western Australia: HMAS Stirling at Rockingham, south of Perth
- Tasmania: Scottsdale

It also has a presence in the Russell Offices in Canberra, in the Australian Capital Territory.

== History ==
The Defence Science and Technology Organisation (DSTO) was created in 1974 by amalgamating the Australian Defence Scientific Service with the Science Branch of the Department of Defence. Over the next 20 years various other Australian Defence laboratories were integrated with DSTO, including what remained of the Weapons Research Establishment, responsible for the Woomera test range.

- 1907 – Defence science begins in Australia.
- 1910 – The start of explosives research at a guardhouse (called the Chemical Adviser's Laboratory) at Victoria Barracks, Melbourne.
- 1911 – Defence Explosive Factory Maribyrnong established at Maribyrnong.
- 1912 – Small Arms Factory established at Lithgow.
- 1921 – Munitions Supply Board created within Department of Defence.
- 1922 – Chemical Adviser's Laboratory became the Munitions Supply Laboratories (MSL) of the Munitions Supply Board.
- 1929 – Proof Range established at Port Wakefield.
- 1939 – Aeronautical & Engine Research Test Laboratory established at Fishermans Bend as part of the Council for Scientific and Industrial Research (CSIR now CSIRO) Division of Aeronautics.
- 1940 – Department of Munitions established. Salisbury Explosives Factory and Finsbury Munitions Factory built within rural environs of Adelaide.
- 1946 – Munitions Supply Laboratories (MSL) established at Finsbury, South Australia (later known as Woodville North when the suburb name was changed) as a branch of MSL at Maribyrnong.
- 1946 – Anglo-Australian Joint Project established at Woomera, with aviation support at RAAF Base Mallala.
- 1947 – Long Range Weapons Establishment (LRWE) formed in Salisbury, South Australia to support the guided weapons facility at Woomera.
- 1948 – Munitions Supply Laboratories changes its name to Defence Research Laboratories.
- 1949 – Fishermans Bend laboratory transferred from CSIR (Council for Scientific and Industrial Research) to the Department of Supply & Development; renamed Aeronautical Research Laboratories (ARL). Australian Defence Scientific Service established, incorporating LRWE and the Defence Research Laboratories.
- 1949 – Laboratory established in Alexandria, NSW as part of Defence Research Laboratories to undertake research in physical metallurgy and metallurgical chemistry areas.
- 1949 – Three new laboratories formed in Salisbury – High Speed Aerodynamics Laboratory, Propulsion Research Laboratory and the Electronics Research Laboratory, collectively known as the Chemistry & Physics Research Laboratory.
- 1953 – Defence Research Laboratories changes its name to Defence Standards Laboratories.
- 1955 – LRWE and all the Salisbury laboratories amalgamated to form the Weapons Research Establishment (WRE). RAAF Base Edinburgh established near Salisbury, superseding Mallala.
- 1956 – The Royal Australian Navy (RAN) Experimental Laboratory established.

1985 ABC news report interviewing David Warren about his invention of the 'Black Box'.

- 1957 – Black Box flight recorder invented by Dr David Warren – originally named the ARL Flight Memory Unit. Its descendants are now installed in large airline aircraft and most military aircraft.
- 1958 – The Army Food Research Laboratories were formally established at Scottsdale, Tasmania under the Quartermaster General Branch, Army Headquarters. The Laboratories' role included research and development of foods for the three Services. Laboratories renamed Defence Food Research Establishment-Vegetable Dehydration Division in 1958.
- 1960 – The Defence Food Research Establishment-Vegetable Dehydration Division renamed The Army Food Science Establishment.
- 1961 – The Army Food Science Establishment renamed The Army Food Research Station.
- 1962 – Joint Tropical Research Unit (JTRU) established in Innisfail, Queensland and operated jointly with the British Ministry of Defence.
- 1967 – Built and launched WRESAT, Australia's first artificial satellite.
- 1969 – RAN Experimental Laboratory changes name to RAN Research Laboratory (RANRL).
- 1971 – The Army Food Science Establishment renamed the Armed Forces Food Science Establishment.
- 1972 – ARL transferred to the Department of Manufacturing Industry.
- 1974 – As a result of Defence restructuring, the Defence Science & Technology Organisation (DSTO) is created by integrating the Australian Defence Scientific Service, the in-house R&D units of the Armed Services and the Science Branch of the Department of Defence. Defence Standards Laboratories becomes the Materials Research Laboratories (MRL).
- 1975 – Official transfer of all Defence R&D activities to DSTO in the Department of Defence. The Armed Forces Food Science Establishment (AFFSE) became part of the Service Laboratories and Trials (SLT) division of DSTO.
- 1977 – Joint Tropical Trials and Research Establishment established (JTTRE), merging JTRU and Tropical Trials Establishment situated at Cowley Beach, Queensland.
- 1977 – MRL, Woodville North transferred to CSIRO Division of Materials Science.
- 1978 – WRE split into four smaller laboratories: Weapons Systems Research Laboratory (WSRL), Electronics Research Laboratory (ERL), Trials Research Laboratory (TRL) and Advanced Engineering Laboratory (AEL). The four laboratories were collectively known as the Defence Research Centre Salisbury (DRCS).
- 1982 – The Armed Forces Food Science Establishment became a part of Materials Research Laboratories (MRL).
- 1984 – RAN Research Laboratory transferred to WSRL.
- 1985 – Materials Research Laboratories, Alexandria, NSW transferred to Army.
- 1987 – Five year restructuring of DSTO laboratories begins. New Surveillance Research Laboratory created and WRE's Electronics Research Laboratory reorganised. RANRL transferred to MRL and renamed.
- 1989 – Control of Cowley Beach was returned to the Army and Innisfail became MRL, Qld.
- 1992 – The UK-Australia Tropical Research agreement terminated.
- 1991 – WSRL abolished to leave four laboratories in DSTO.
- 1994 – ARL and MRL merge to form the Aeronautical & Maritime Research Laboratory (AMRL) headquartered in Fishermans Bend. Surveillance Research Laboratory and Electronics Research Laboratory merge to form the Electronics & Surveillance Research Laboratory (ESRL) headquartered in Salisbury, leaving only two laboratories in DSTO.
- 1994 – The Armed Forces Food Science Establishment was renamed The Defence Food Science Centre (DFSC).
- 1997 – ESRL complex rationalised and new "Knowledge Systems Building" in Edinburgh, South Australia, (the newly renamed part of Salisbury containing DSTO), officially opened. The Defence Food Science Centre (DFSC) was renamed Defence Nutrition Research Centre (DNRC). Port Wakefield Proof Range became the Proof and Experimental Establishment.
- 2002 – DSTO restructured, resulting in three laboratories: Platforms Sciences Laboratory, Systems Sciences Laboratory and Information Sciences Laboratory.
- 2002 – DSTO, along with the Royal Australian Air Force and the Canadian Forces, wins the ICAS von Karman Award for International Cooperation in Aeronautics for its international program assessing the fatigue life of the F/A-18 A/B Hornet aircraft.
- 2003 – Maritime Operational Analysis Centre (MOAC) opened at Garden Island, Sydney
- 2004 – H A Wills Structures and Materials Test Centre officially opened at Fishermans Bend.
- 2004 – CBRN functions transferred from Maribyrnong to Fishermans Bend.
- 2004 – Torpedo Systems Centre and Maritime Experimentation Laboratory opened at DSTO Edinburgh
- 2006 – DSTO and US Air Force sign agreement on Hypersonic International Flight Research Experimentation (HIFiRE) Program.
- 2008 – Professor Robert Clark appointed Chief Defence Scientist, the first external appointment to the post since 1991.
- 2009 – DSTO and US Air Force complete first successful launch under the Hypersonic International Flight Research Experimentation (HIFiRE) Program, confirming that the test vehicle turned onto the correct heading and elevation for re-entry into the atmosphere as designed.
- 2010 – DSTO organises the Multi Autonomous Ground-robotic International Challenge with US Army.
- 2012 – DSTO, along with the US Air Force Research Laboratory, Boeing Research & Technology and the University of Queensland, wins the ICAS von Karman Award for International Cooperation in Aeronautics for collaboration on the Hypersonic International Flight Research Experimentation (HIFiRE) Program.
- 2012 – Dr Alex Zelinsky appointed Chief Defence Scientist in March 2012.
- 2015 – DSTO becomes DSTG.
- 2019 – Professor Tanya Monro appointed Chief Defence Scientist in March 2019.
- 2025 – Three year collaboration between DSTG's Information Sciences Division and India’s Defence Research and Development Organisation (DRDO) to enhance undersea surveillance capabilities, with a focus on detecting and tracking submarines and autonomous underwater vehicles.

== Chief Defence Scientist ==
The Chief Defence Scientist of Australia leads the Defence Science & Technology Group (DSTG Group). Prof. Tanya Monro is the current Chief Defence Scientist, having taken up the role in March 2019.

Chief Defence Scientists	Period in office
Dr Alan Butement	1949–1967
H A Wills	1968–1971
Dr J L Farrands	1971–1977
Prof Tom Fink	1978–1986
Henry d'Assumpcao	1987–1990
Dr R G Ward	1991–1992
Dr R G Brabin-Smith	1993–2000
Dr Ian Chessell	2000–2003
Dr Roger Lough	2003–2008
Prof Robert Clark	2008–2011
Dr Alex Zelinsky	2012–2018
Prof Tanya Monro	2019–

== See also ==
- ANSTO (Australian Nuclear Science and Technology Organisation) – Australia's national nuclear organisation and the centre of Australian nuclear expertise
- CSIRO (Commonwealth Scientific and Industrial Research Organisation) – the national government body for scientific research in Australia
- NICTA (National ICT Australia) – Australia's national information and communication technology research centre
- South Australian Aviation Museum – repository of DSTG's historic rocket collection from the period 1950 – 1980.
- TTCP (The Technical Cooperation Program) – An international defence science and technology collaboration between Australia, Canada, New Zealand, the United Kingdom and the United States.
