= Henry d'Assumpcao =

Emeritus Professor Henry d'Assumpção AO
- Born: Henrique Antonio d'Assumpção; 9 August 1934 (age 92); Macau, Colony of Portugal
- Occupation: Electronic engineer
- Known for: Chief Defence Scientist of Australia (1987-1990)
- Scientific career
- Education: University of Adelaide (Bachelor of Engineering (hons) 1956, Master of Engineering 1962).
- Awards: AO; M. A. Sargent Medal
- Fields: sonar, radar
- Workplaces: WRE/DSTO

Henrique Antonio (Henry) d'Assumpção AO (born 9 August 1934) is an Australian electronic engineer, and was Chief Defence Scientist from 1987 to 1990.

d'Assumpção joined the Weapons Research Establishment (now known as Defence Science and Technology Group) in 1958 and took up work pioneered by Alan Butement on Barra sonobuoys and later Kariwara towed arrays. He worked his way up the organisation, culminating in the role of Chief Defence Scientist from 1987 to 1990. After leaving the Department of Defence, d'Assumpcao took up a role as professor at the University of South Australia and CEO of the Cooperative Research Centre for Sensor Signal and Information Processing until his retirement in 2000.

d'Assumpção was appointed an Officer of the Order of Australia in 1992 in recognition of his service to science and technology. He was elected a fellow of the Australian Academy of Technological Sciences & Engineering in 1981.

He won the 2003 M. A. Sargent Medal.

Government offices
Preceded by Prof Tom Fink	Chief Defence Scientist of Australia; 1987–1990	Succeeded by Bob Ward
