= Tim Stone =

British businessman (born 1951)

Timothy John Stone, CBE (born 1951) is a British businessman and senior expert adviser with interests in infrastructure, finance, nuclear power and water supply. He is a non-executive director of the Arup Group, chairman of Nuclear Risk Insurers and former non-executive director of Horizon Nuclear Power and a former senior expert non-executive director on the board of the European Investment Bank. He was also a non-executive director of Anglian Water from 2011 to 2015. He was appointed Chair of the UK's Nuclear Industry Association in October 2018, a position he stepped down from in 2025.

Stone was appointed a Commander of the Order of the British Empire in the 2010 Queen's Birthday Honours List for his service to the energy industry. In 2011 he received a Lifetime Achievement Award from the publication Infrastructure Journal. Stone has been referred to by The Independent as "one of the great sages of the PFI (Private finance initiative)."

== Education ==
Stone completed a DPhil in Physical Chemistry at Oxford University, and studied at St Catherine's College from 1969 to 1976.

== Career ==
=== Early career ===
Stone was the chairman and founder of KPMG's Global Infrastructure and Projects Group where he worked from 1995 to 2011. He was also managing director of S.G. Warburg in London and New York, where he was a founder of the operator of the Channel Tunnel Rail Link, London & Continental Railways. He also worked in New York as a managing director of Chase Manhattan Bank.

=== Public service ===
Stone joined the UK public service in 2007 on part-time secondment from KPMG where he held positions as the Senior Adviser to five successive Secretaries of State responsible for energy and as Expert Chair of the Office for Nuclear Development in the Department of Energy & Climate Change. He was initially tasked in January 2007 "to advise Government on financing the costs of decommissioning and waste management and disposal costs for new nuclear power stations." He reported to the Secretary of State for Business, Enterprise and Regulatory Reform and the Chief Secretary to the Treasury. During his secondment as a nuclear adviser, he worked on establishing a framework for the construction of new nuclear power plants in the United Kingdom.

He first began advising government on key policy initiatives in the 1990s. While working in the government's energy departments as a non-political advisor, amongst other activities he also worked on Carbon Capture and Storage projects and tidal projects. He has regularly said that he is keen to support all forms of electricity generation that are safe, low-carbon and the least expensive to society and is not in favour of any one form of generation over others but that all options must be considered as a system.

Stone has also worked as an external consultant to South Australia's Deputy Premier and Treasurer Kevin Foley on infrastructure projects, including the development of the new Royal Adelaide Hospital, providing expertise in the development of public-private partnerships (PPPs). His work on PFIs in the United Kingdom led The Independent to dub him a "great sage".

=== Academia ===
Stone was appointed to University College London in 2010 where he continues to work as a Visiting Professor. He has taught at the Bartlett School since 2010, where he has described his role as "teaching graduates and supporting research into practical creation of projects and their financing and investment opportunities." In 2012 he began teaching graduate courses on energy policy, finance and supporting practical projects at UCL Australia's International Energy Policy Institute, which was based in Adelaide, South Australia.

== Nuclear power ==
=== 2012-2015 ===
Stone has long-term interests in energy and electricity markets, finance and policy, and has supported the use of nuclear power generation as part of a low-carbon energy policy in the United Kingdom. He has spoken in favour of possible nuclear industrial expansion in Australia. During presentations on the future of the nuclear industry, he has discussed the role of renewable energy in the world's future energy mix, particularly the need to consider full system costs of all forms of generation. He has also discussed deaths per terawatt hour of electricity generated by different forms of electricity generation and noted that hydro and nuclear have some of the lowest death rates, lower, he claims, than for rooftop solar. He has also said that epidemiological studies on cancer clusters that were said to related to radiation exposure were controversial when analysed rigorously and noted that many studies were statistically problematic.

Stone has given presentations to a wide range of interest groups, from students to government and business associations in the UK, Singapore, Japan and Australia. Stone's association with the Japanese nuclear industry was strengthened through his 2014 appointment to the board of Horizon Nuclear Power, which was acquired by Japanese nuclear manufacturer Hitachi in 2012.

=== 2015-16 Nuclear Fuel Cycle Royal Commission, South Australia ===
Stone provided commentary to the Australian media following the commencement of South Australia's Nuclear Fuel Cycle Royal Commission in 2015. He expressed his support for nuclear power in Australia, and delivered a number of presentations in March during which references were made to the Commission.

On 12 March he gave a presentation at an event hosted by the Committee for Economic Development of Australia (CEDA) called the SA Nuclear Energy Review. The event was intended to "lead discussion around what a Nuclear Energy future in South Australia could look like and provide opportunity for CEDA members to feed into the Royal Commission into Nuclear Energy." At the event, Stone claimed that nuclear energy was cheaper to generate than renewable energy, saying:

"When you work out the cost of the electricity over the life of the (nuclear) kit…it is a lot cheaper than the honest number for renewables... If you add the cost of that (production) plus the cost of intermittency support, it’s a lot more expensive and this is the issue where we need to get rational conversations."

On 20 March, Stone gave a presentation at the Energy State of the Nation forum held by the Energy Policy Institute of Australia in Sydney. His presentation was entitled Challenges for future energy regulation and covered three topics: "Structural changes in energy markets, technological changes including nuclear technology and regulatory responses and accountability including implications for the SA Nuclear Royal Commission."

He was appointed to the Expert Advisory Committee for the same Royal Commission the following month. The chief recommendation of the Royal Commission was that South Australia investigated the prospect of establishing a deep geological nuclear waste storage facility. The recommendation was then rejected by a Citizens Jury in late 2016.

=== 2017-present ===
In 2017 Stone became the independent reviewer of the UK's Energy Technologies Institute Nuclear Cost Drivers Project, which aims to identify cost reductions in nuclear power plant design, construction and operation.

In October 2018, Stone was appointed Chairman of the UK's Nuclear Industry Association, succeeding Lord Hutton in the role. Stone also received the Hinton Medal from the Nuclear Institute for outstanding contribution to the nuclear industry. Since taking on the role at the NIA, Stone has urged Cumbria to promote its expertise in nuclear, in particular decommissioning, has claimed that the biggest challenge facing the nuclear sector is "trust". In April 2019 he said “There needs to be trust and confidence in Government, regulators and communities... the biggest thing we have to do is to rebuild that trust and confidence with investors."

=== Great British Nuclear ===
Stone was heavily involved in the creation of, and chaired the Industry Advisory Group of Great British Nuclear, the body established from a round table with Prime Minister, Boris Johnson, on 21 March 2022 to accelerate the delivery of new nuclear power in the UK.

== Shale gas ==
Stone has advised on shale gas extraction in the United Kingdom. He is a co-author of the 2013 DECC publication Potential Greenhouse Gas Emissions Associated with Shale Gas Extraction and Use, also known as the Mackay-Stone Report. The report presented an evidence-based view of shale gas extraction and use in the UK and became a basis for the development of government policy on the regulation of shale gas development in the United Kingdom.
