= Pam Sykes =

Australian medical scientist

Pamela Sykes is an Australian medical scientist, Emeritus Professor at the College of Medicine and Public Health and was the Chair of the Institutional Biosafety Committee at the Flinders Centre for Innovation in Cancer at Flinders University. She is a Strategic Professor in the area of Preventive Cancer Biology and leads a research group which studies the biological effects of low-dose radiation. She is a deputy presiding member of the Radiation Protection Committee of the Environmental Protection Authority (EPA) for the Government of South Australia which advises the Minister of South Australia and the EPA on 'radiation protection in medical, industrial, scientific and public uses of ionising and non-ionising radiation'. Her research has been published in National Library of Medicine (NIH), Research Gate, Epigenetics, Transgenic Research, Cell Biology and Toxicology, PLOS ONE, Mutation Research and the Journal of Clinical Pathology. She is an Associate Editor for the journal Radiation Research. Sykes' research into the effects of low-dose ionising radiation has been funded by the United States Department of Energy's Low Dose Radiation Research Program since the early 2000s. She also investigated how parthenolide could aid radiotherapy.

As of 2016, Sykes is a member of the UCL Australia Nuclear Working Group.

== Selected publications ==
- Until There Is a Resolution of the Pro-LNT/Anti-LNT Debate, We Should Head Toward a More Sensible Graded Approach for Protection From Low-Dose Ionizing Radiation, 2020.
- The combination of metformin and valproic acid has a greater anti-tumoral effect on prostate cancer growth in vivo than either drug alone, Flinders University, 2019.
- Chronic low dose ethanol induces an aggressive metastatic phenotype in TRAMP mice, which is counteracted by parthenolide, 2018.
- MP83-08 combination of metformin and sodium valproate for prostate cancer: a rapid approach from bench to clinical trial, 2017.
