= Robert George Ward =

Bob Ward FTSE

Chief Defence Scientist
- In office January 1991 – 1992
- Preceded by: Henry d'Assumpcao
- Succeeded by: Richard Brabin-Smith

Personal details
- Born: Robert George Ward England
- Died: 5 May 2013 (aged 85)
- Spouse(s): Elisabeth (Dinny) Culican Ward, (nee Badenoch)

Robert George (Bob) Ward FTSE (c.1928 – 2013) was a British and Australian metallurgist. He came from Farnborough, Hampshire and became was Professor of Metallurgy at McMaster University (Ontario, Canada). In 1966 he moved to BHP in Melbourne, Australia. From 1991 to 1992 he was Australia's Chief Defence Scientist at the Defence Science and Technology Organisation.

Ward became Head of Research at BHP in 1966. He was General Manager of Planning and Research in 1970-1974 and General Manager of Research and New Technology in 1974–1988. He was Deputy Chairman of the Australian Atomic Energy Commission, and a member of the National Energy Research and Development Council and the Advisory Council of the CSIRO.

He was appointed a Foundation Fellow of the Australian Academy of Technological Sciences (ATSE) in 1976.

Ward died in Melbourne on 5 May 2013, aged 85.

Government offices
Preceded by Henry d'Assumpcao	Chief Defence Scientist of Australia; 1991–1992	Succeeded by Richard Brabin-Smith
