= Robert Clark (physicist) =

Australian physicist

Professor Robert Clark AO FAA FRSN
- Title: Chief Defence Scientist
- Term: 2008 to 2011
- Predecessor: Roger Lough
- Successor: Alex Zelinsky
- Scientific career
- Education: University of New South Wales
- Awards: Walter Boas Medal 1998; Eureka Prize for Leadership in Science (2008)
- Fields: quantum computing
- Workplaces: University of New South Wales; Defence Science and Technology Organisation
- Thesis: Enhanced Nuclear Magnetism (1983)

Robert Graham Clark is an Australian physicist. He was appointed Professor and Chair of Energy Strategy and Policy at University of New South Wales (UNSW) in 2012. Prior to this he was Chief Defence Scientist from 2008 to 2011 and Professor of Experimental Physics at University of New South Wales, where he established the National Magnet Laboratory and Semiconductor Nanofabrication Facility.

Clark joined the Royal Australian Navy as a Cadet Midshipman in 1969. He graduated from the RAN college with a Bachelor of Science from the University of New South Wales, then served on eight ships before leaving the navy in 1979. He holds an MA from Oxford and a PhD from the University of New South Wales. He took several positions at UNSW, culminating in Director of the Australian Research Council Centre of Excellence for Quantum Computer Technology, before taking on the role of Chief Defence Scientist.

Clark was appointed an Officer of the Order of Australia on Australia Day 2013 "for distinguished service to science and technology through leadership and governance of the scientific community of the Australian Defence Force and through contributions to quantum computing and nanotechnology". and was awarded the Centenary Medal on 1 January 2001 "for contribution to world leading research in the field of quantum computing and physics". He is a Fellow of the Australian Academy of Science (2001), a Distinguished Fellow of the Royal Society of New South Wales (2009), and has received numerous other acknowledgements and awards.

Government offices
| Preceded by Roger Lough | Chief Defence Scientist of Australia; 2008–2011 | Succeeded by Alex Zelinsky |
