= Rob Lewis (marine scientist) =

Rob Lewis is a South Australian marine scientist and retired senior civil servant. He discovered the first known upwelling system in southern Australia and was professionally involved in fisheries and aquaculture management for 38 years. He was head of South Australian Research and Development Institute (SARDI) from 1992 to 2010.

== Career ==
Lewis joined South Australia's Department of Fisheries as a research officer in 1973, where he worked in support of the rock lobster fishery. By 1987 he was working in a research management capacity, balancing fisheries, aquaculture and marine conservation interests. He joined SARDI in 1992, and was appointed Executive Director in 1993. There he was responsible for guiding SARDI in its development as a "model state research agency" supporting the interests of South Australia's primary industries. He promoted collaboration between Government, private sector interests and academic institutions and helped secure South Australia's role in the establishment of Collaborative Research Centres (CRCs) for Aquaculture, Finfish, Molecular Plant Breeding and Seafood.

In 2002, Lewis named the growth of aquaculture, the development of plump and juicy cherries and research in soil-born diseases as highlights of the first ten years of SARDI.

Under Lewis' leadership, SARDI obtained the research vessel Ngerin, established the SA Aquatic Sciences Centre, refined plans for the Plant Research Centre and supported the development of the Lincoln Marine Science Centre. Lewis was "a major driver" in the establishment of the Marine Innovation South Australia initiative; a collaborative project involving SARDI Aquatic Sciences, Flinders University, the University of Adelaide, the South Australian Museum and the seafood industry with the goal of increasing the value of South Australia's seafood sector.

Lewis retired from SARDI in 2010 but continues to hold an honorary fellowship there. He went on to become the independent chair of the Fisheries and Aquaculture National Priorities Forum.

The South Australian Aquatic Biosecurity Centre, a collaboration between the University of Adelaide and SARDI opened in 2011. Lewis was involved in the project as the chair of Marine Innovation South Australia.

He is also a Fellow of the Australian Academy of Technological Sciences and Engineering.

He was awarded a Centenary Medal for services to marine sciences in 2003 and an Australian Honours Public Service Medal for services to primary industries research and development in 2011.

Lewis was appointed the inaugural President of Experiencing Marine Sanctuaries, a not-for-profit organisation which offers guided snorkeling tours within South Australian waters.

== Board memberships ==
Lewis has been a member of various management and advisory boards.

They include:

- Premier's Science and Research Council
- South Australian Primary Industries Research and Development Board
- Australian Fisheries Management Authority
- Cooperative Research Centre for Molecular Plant Breeding
- Molecular Plant Breeding Pty Ltd
- Airborne Research Australia Pty Ltd
- The Crawford Fund SA Pty Ltd
- Australian Grain Technologies Pty Ltd
- Ausbiotech Pty Ltd (SA Division)

He had acted as Chair of the following entities:

- Australian Fisheries Management Authority Research Committee
- Commonwealth Fisheries Research Advisory Board
- Southern Bluefin Tuna Management Advisory Committee
- Australian Maritime College Council
- The A W Howard Memorial Trust Pty Ltd
- Adelaide and Mt Lofty Ranges Natural Resources Management Board
