= Caroline McMillen =

Australian medical and health academic

Professor Caroline McMillen AO FAHMS

Chief Scientist of South Australia
- In office November 2018 – August 2023
- Premier: Steven Marshall
- Preceded by: Leanna Read
- Succeeded by: Craig Simmons

Vice-Chancellor of the University of Newcastle
- In office 2011–2018
- Preceded by: Nicholas Saunders
- Succeeded by: Alex Zelinsky

Personal details
- Born: Isabella Caroline McMillen; 23 September 1954 (age 72) Belfast, Northern Ireland
- Education: University of Oxford (BSc, MA, DPhil); University of Cambridge (MB BChir)
- Scientific career
- Awards: Fellow of the Australian Academy of Health and Medical Sciences (2015); Officer of the Order of Australia (2020)
- Workplaces: University of Newcastle (2011–18); University of South Australia (2005–11); University of Adelaide (1992–2005); Monash University (1989–92)

Isabella Caroline McMillen (born 23 September 1954) is an Australian medical and health academic and was Chief Scientist of South Australia from October 2018 to August 2023. She is a Fellow of the Australian Academy of Health and Medical Sciences, a Fellow of the Royal Society of New South Wales and a Bragg Member of the Royal Institution of Australia. She is a Director of Compass Housing Services Co Ltd, the South Australian Health and Medical Research Institute, the Australian Science Media Centre and a member of the Council of the University of South Australia.

== Early life and education ==
McMillen was born in Belfast, Northern Ireland, on 23 September 1954, and grew up in England. She holds a Bachelor of Arts (Honours) and Doctor of Philosophy from the University of Oxford, and completed her medical training, graduating with a Bachelor of Medicine, Bachelor of Surgery, at the University of Cambridge.

== Academic career ==
McMillen moved to Australia in 1983 to lecture at Monash University. She later move to the University of Adelaide, where she was appointed the head of physiology from 1992. Her early research focused on the effects of prenatal nutrition on adult diseases. Her research was funded for two decades by the Australian Research Council and the National Health and Medical Research Council and she was on the PMSEIC Working Group on Aboriginal and Torres Strait Islander maternal and perinatal health. McMillen was also a Member of the Expert Advisory Group for Science in Australia Gender Equity (SAGE).

McMillen has served on industry boards such as the Australia Automotive Industry Innovation Council, CRC for Advanced Automotive Technology and the CRC for Rail Innovation as well as the South Australian Premier’s Climate Change Council and the NSW Innovation and Productivity Council. She has also served on the Boards of the Australian Business Higher Education Round Table, Universities Australia and the Universities Admissions Centre.

McMillen was Deputy Vice-Chancellor and Vice President of Research and Innovation at the University of South Australia from 2005 to 2011. In 2011, she was appointed as the seventh Vice-Chancellor and President of the University of Newcastle. In November 2017, McMillen announced her intention to retire as vice-chancellor, just one year into her four-year contract renewal. She completed her term on 4 November 2018. At the end of her term, McMillen was presented with the Key to the City of Newcastle by Nuatali Nelmes, the Lord Mayor of Newcastle, on 12 October 2018.

Following her retirement from academia, McMillen became the fifth Chief Scientist of South Australia on 18 October 2018. In the 2020 Queen's Birthday Honours, she was appointed an Officer of the Order of Australia in recognition of her "distinguished service to medical science, and to tertiary education, to the community of South Australia, and to social equity."

Academic offices
Preceded by Nicholas Saunders	Vice-Chancellor of the University of Newcastle; 2011–2018	Succeeded by Alex Zelinsky
Preceded by Leanna Read	Chief Scientist of South Australia; 2018–2023	Succeeded by Craig Simmons
