= Leanna Read =

Australian scientist

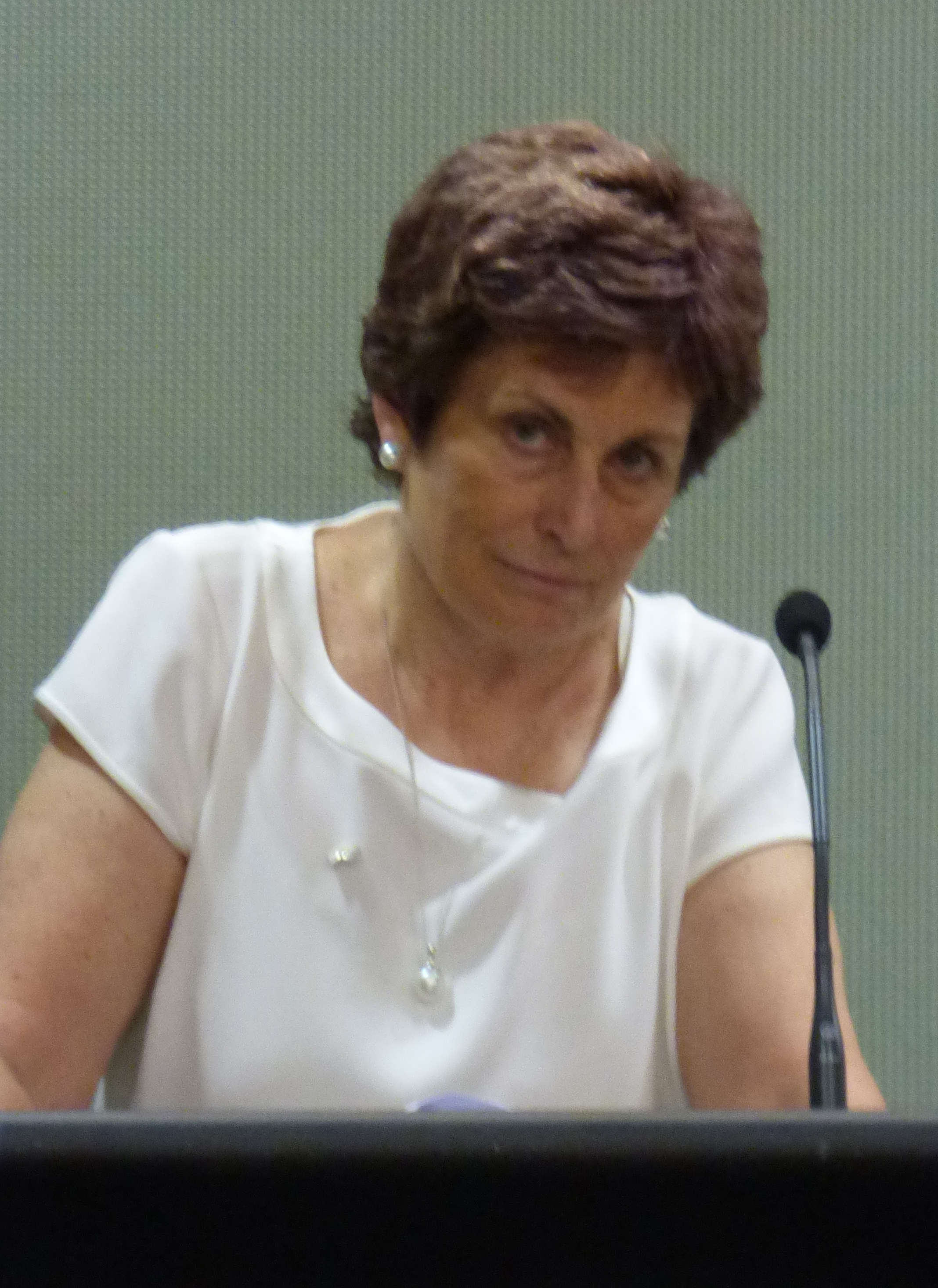
Dr Leanna Read (2017)

Leanna Read is an Australian biotechnology expert and businessperson. She was the fourth Chief Scientist of South Australia from 2014 to 2018. She was appointed in August 2014 as successor to Don Bursill and is the first woman to hold the position.

== Career ==
Dr Leanna Read has an undergraduate degree in biochemistry from the University of Adelaide and a PhD in biochemistry from Flinders University in South Australia. She has published over 90 scientific papers, usually under the name Leanna C. Read or LC Read. Her business experience is focussed on biotechnology and commercialization. Read is a member of South Australia's Economic Development Board and has invested in early-stage life-sciences businesses through her membership of BioAngels. She is a board director of Biosensis Pty Ltd. and was the founding managing director and CEO of TGR BioSciences (an Adelaide-based biotechnology company) from 2001 to 2012.

Read has received an honorary doctorate from the University of South Australia and is also a member of the university's council. As of 2015 she is the chair of the Cooperative Research Centre (CRC) for Cell Therapy Manufacturing and has previously led the CRC for Tissue Growth and Repair, which is regarded as one of the most successful commercially focused CRCs in Australia.

=== National Science Policy Advisory Boards ===
Read has had a number of positions on Australian Government science policy boards including the Prime Minister's Science, Innovation and Engineering Council, the Industry Research and Development Board, Commercialisation Australia and the Biomedical Translation Fund Committee. In December 2022 she was appointed to the Australian Government's newly established National Research Infrastructure Advisory Group.

=== Nuclear industrial development ===
In 2006, Read served on the Chief Scientist's Expert Panel during the Uranium Mining, Processing and Nuclear Energy Review (UMPNER) in 2006.

In April 2015, Read was appointed to the Expert Advisory Committee of the Nuclear Fuel Cycle Royal Commission in South Australia. Read is a Fellow of the Australian Academy of Technological Sciences and Engineering, which advocated for nuclear power in Australia in August 2014. Read is also the chair of the South Australian Science Council. In 2016, she was one of a group of prominent South Australians who signed an open letter encouraging government to continue to explore opportunities in the importation and storage of spent nuclear fuel.

== Honors ==
Read was awarded 2006 South Australian of the Year (Science and Technology) and was the 2011 winner of the Ernst & Young Entrepreneur of the Year (Central Region, Technology category).

Academic offices
Preceded by Don Bursill	Chief Scientist of South Australia; 2014–2018	Succeeded by Caroline McMillen
