= Max Brennan (physicist) =

Australian academic and physicist (born 1932)

Max Brennan AO FAA
- Brennan in 2026

1st Chief Scientist of South Australia
- In office June 2005 – March 2008
- Premier: Mike Rann
- Preceded by: Office established
- Succeeded by: Ian Chessell

Personal details
- Born: Maxwell Howard Brennan; 26 September 1932 (age 94) Sydney, New South Wales, Australia
- Education: University of Sydney (BSc; PhD)
- Occupation: Academic; physicist

Academic work
- Discipline: Physics
- Institutions: Princeton University; University of Sydney; Flinders University

Maxwell Howard Brennan (born 26 September 1932) is an Australian physicist and academic who served as chairman of the Australian Atomic Energy Commission from 1983 to 1997 and was the first Chief Scientist of South Australia from 2005 to 2008.

Brennan was born in Sydney. He obtained a Bachelor of Science (Hons) from the University of Sydney in 1954 and a Doctor of Philosophy from the same institution in 1958. He joined Princeton University as a research associate between 1958 and 1961, involved in low-energy nuclear physics. Subsequently, Brennan became a lecturer at the University of Sydney.

In 1964, Brennan was made foundation professor of physics at the University of Adelaide's Bedford Park campus, which was founded as Flinders University in 1966. He began a program of research in plasma physics at the same university. Later, Brennan was president of the Australian Institute of Nuclear Science and Engineering between 1971 and 1972 and pro-vice-chancellor at Flinders University between 1978 and 1980. In the following year, he returned to the University of Sydney as professor of physics with a focus on plasma physics. Following his retirement from academia in 1997, he was appointed as the inaugural Chief Scientist of South Australia from 2005 until his retirement in 2008.

== Early life and education ==
Maxwell Howard Brennan was born in Sydney on 26 September 1932. He enrolled at University of Sydney for his undergraduate, and graduated in 1954 with a Bachelor of Science (Hons). Afterwards, he continued his postgraduate at the same university where he obtained his Doctor of Philosophy in 1958.

== Career ==
=== Academic career (1958–1982) ===
Brennan was hired by Princeton University as a research associate between 1958 and 1961. He researched low energy nuclear physics there. Brennan went back to Australia in 1961 and became a lecturer in physics at the University of Sydney from 1961 to 1962 and a senior lecturer from 1963 to 1964. In Sydney, Brennan studied the experimental properties of magnetohydrodynamic shock waves and became a member of the plasma physics research group led by Charles Norman Watson-Munro, who made linear plasma generators using hydromagnetic ionising shock waves.

In 1964, Brennan was appointed foundation professor of physics at the University of Adelaide's Physics Department on North Terrace. This came as a result of the new Bedford Park campus undergoing construction at the time. Brennan hired the School of Physical Sciences' first faculty members, created course and research programs, and made changes to the faculty building design.

Brennan set up a plasma physics research program at Flinders that dealt with the generation and investigation of highly ionised plasmas. This involved the generation of plasma columns by means of ionising shock waves, conditions for the efficient generation of plasmas, diagnosis techniques to study the generated plasmas, and the propagation of Alfvén waves. At Flinders University, he set up the first plasma physics research program together with his first PhD student and conducted research into ionising shock waves and the first plasma source.

As head of the School of Physical Sciences, Brennan allocated funding for additional academic positions to the plasma physics group. He was also involved in the creation of a chair of theoretical physics in 1967 and appointed additional academic staff between 1968 and 1970. Additionally, Brennan established a research team in atomic and nuclear physics. He later obtained workshop facilities, developed undergraduate and school physics courses, and introduced a research efficiency index based on research-grant earnings.

Brennan was president of the Australian Institute of Nuclear Science and Engineering between 1971 and 1972 and pro-vice-chancellor at Flinders University between 1978 and 1980. Between 1980 and 1982, he was chairman of the Queen Elizabeth II Fellowships and Australian Research Grants Committee.

=== Later career and public service (1981–2012) ===
Brennan stepped down as foundation professor of physics at Flinders in 1981 and returned to the University of Sydney as professor of physics, specialising in plasma physics. His research at Sydney included work on plasma waves in toroidal geometry. He remained a professor until 1997 and served as pro-vice-chancellor from 1986 to 1989.

From 1983 to 1997, Brennan was appointed Chairman of the Australian Atomic Energy Commission. Around that time, he was the Chairman of the National Research Fellowship Advisory Committee from 1986 to 1987, followed by the position of Chairman of the International Fusion Research Council from 1986 to 1993. In 1988, Brennan was elected a member of the National Board of Employment, Education and Training. He was also the Head of the School of Physics of the University of Sydney as well as Deputy Chairman of the Higher Education Council from that same year up until 1990.

In August 1990, Brennan was named the favoured choice as the chief executive of the Australian Research Council instead of Geoff Wilson, following a government interference in the panel selection process. Subsequently, he became chairman of the Australian Research Council in 1991, where he held until 1995. Following that appointment, he chaired the Physical Sciences and Engineering Panel of the Cooperative Research Centre. Brennan also worked as an adviser to the World Bank on higher education and research from 1994 to 2007. In 1996, he was appointed emeritus professor at Flinders University and later at the University of Sydney in 1997. Immediately afterwards, he retired in August of that year.

In June 2005, Brennan was appointed the first Chief Scientist of South Australia by the Rann government. He held the newly established position until March 2008, when he was succeeded by Ian Chessell. From 2009, Brennan was chairman of eResearch SA. He was also a board director of the Cooperative Research Centre for Contamination Assessment and Remediation of the Environment and chairman of its Research and Technology Committee. He retired from the CRC CARE Board on 31 December 2012.

== Honours and awards ==
Brennan was awarded by Flinders University an honorary Doctor of Science in 1985. In recognition of his science and technology service, he was appointed an Officer of the Order of Australia (AO) in the 1986 Australia Day Honours. Later in 1988, he was elected a Fellow of the Australian Academy of Science (FAA). Brennan was awarded the Centenary Medal on 1 January 2001, in acknowledgment of his service to Australian society and science in plasma physics. He also was awarded an honorary doctorate from the University of South Australia in 2011.

== Selected publications ==
- Brennan, M. H.; Lehane, J. A.; Malos, J.; Millar, D. D.; Wallace, C. S.; Winn, M. M. (September 1958). "The Sydney air shower experiment". Il Nuovo Cimento. 8 (Supplement 2): 653–661. doi:10.1007/BF02962583.
- Brennan, M. H.; Malos, J.; Millar, D. D.; Wallace, C. S. (11 October 1958). "Air Showers of Size Greater than 10⁵ Particles: (2) Čerenkov Radiation Accompanying the Showers". Nature. 182: 973–977. doi:10.1038/182973a0.
- Brennan, M.; Lehane, J.; Millar, D.; Watson-Munro, C. (1963). "The Design and Characteristics of Highly Ionized Hydrogenous Laboratory Plasma Sources" (PDF). Australian Journal of Physics. 16: 340–352. doi:10.1071/PH630340. Archived from the original (PDF) on 14 September 2026.
- Brennan, M. H.; McCarthy, A. L.; Sawley, M. L. (1980). "Determination of equilibrium plasma density and magnetic field profiles using magnetoacoustic oscillations". Plasma Physics. 22 (1): 77. doi:10.1088/0032-1028/22/1/006.
- Borg, G. G.; Brennan, M. H.; Cross, R. C.; Giannone, L.; Donnelly, I. J. (1985). "Guided propagation of Alfvén waves in a toroidal plasma". Plasma Physics and Controlled Fusion. 27 (10): 1125–. doi:10.1088/0741-3335/27/10/004.
- Brennan, M. H. (2002). "Charles Norman Watson-Munro, 1915–1991". Historical Records of Australian Science. 14 (1): 89–98. doi:10.1071/HR02005.
- Brennan, M. H. (September 2008). "Data Processing in the Early Cosmic Ray Experiments in Sydney". The Computer Journal. 51 (5): 561–565. doi:10.1093/comjnl/bxm119.

Government offices
Preceded by Office established	Chief Scientist of South Australia; 2005–2008	Succeeded by Ian Chessell
