= Economic Development Board (South Australia) =

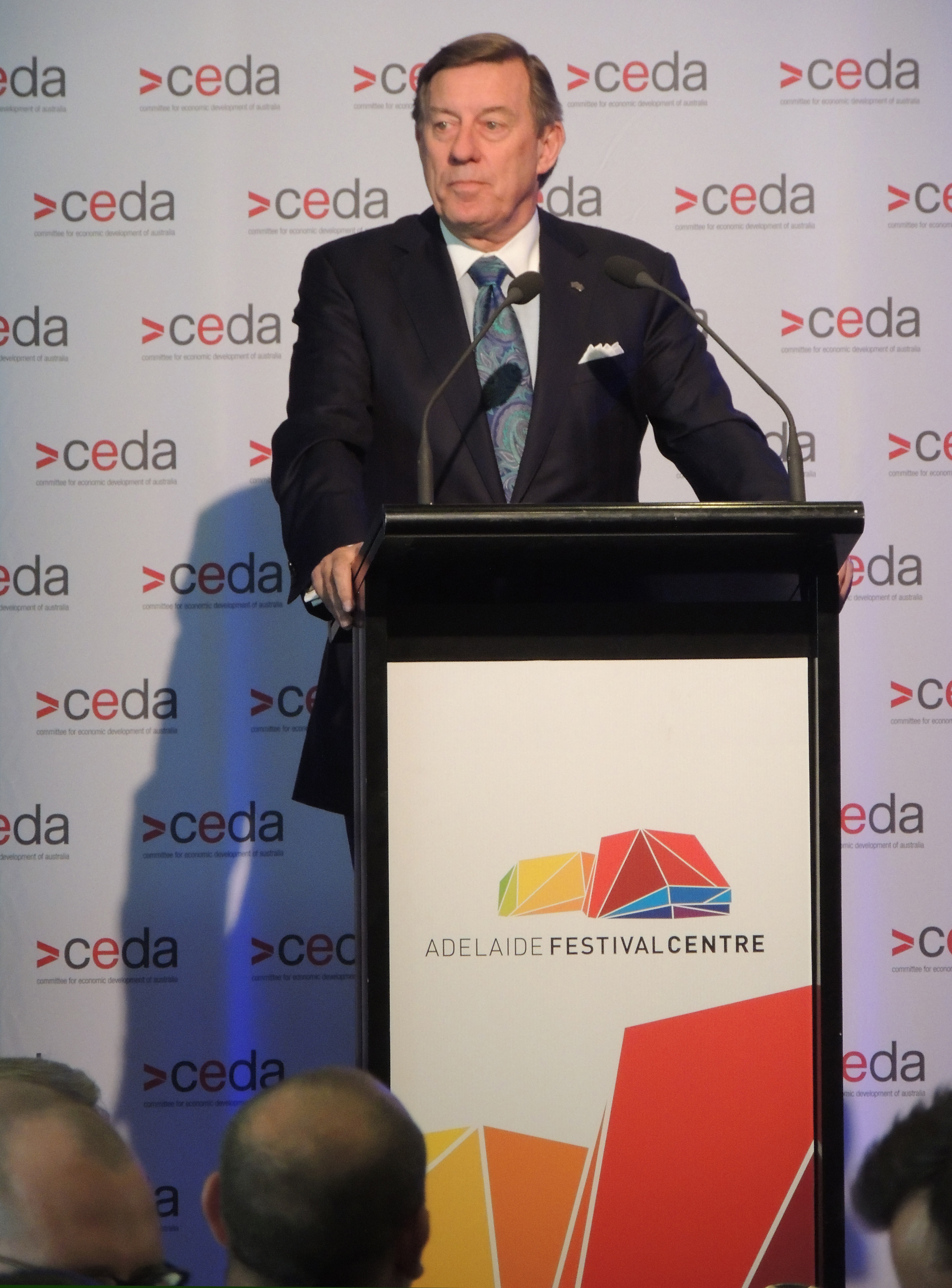
Raymond Spencer, chair of the EDB speaks at a CEDA event in Adelaide (2015)

The Economic Development Board was an independent advisory body to the Government of South Australia focused on economic development issues in South Australia. It was established by the Rann government in 2002 and concluded with the first budget of the Marshall Government in 2018.

== History ==
The EDB spanned the terms of two Labor Premiers, Rann (2002–2011) and Weatherill (2011–2017). It was formed by then-premier Mike Rann to improve SA's business outlook, and was considered to be the state's "highest-powered" advisory group.

The board received an "overhaul" in May 2014, with the replacement of half of its twelve-person membership. Then-current Chair, Raymond Spencer, described one aspect of the reshuffle as creating "a direct linkage into the Premier which will ensure our work can be accelerated and prioritised." Premier Jay Weatherill once commended the board for "supporting South Australia’s growth sectors - specifically unconventional gas, education and agricultural areas."

Following the election of a Liberal government in March 2018, Treasurer Rob Lucas defunded and disbanded the board with the government's first budget. Former EDB member Tanya Monro was reengaged as a member of the newly-formed Premier's Economic Advisory Council, along with new members: Jacqui McGill, Nick Reade, Geoff Rohrsheim, Bill Spurr AO and Christine Zeitz.

== Membership ==
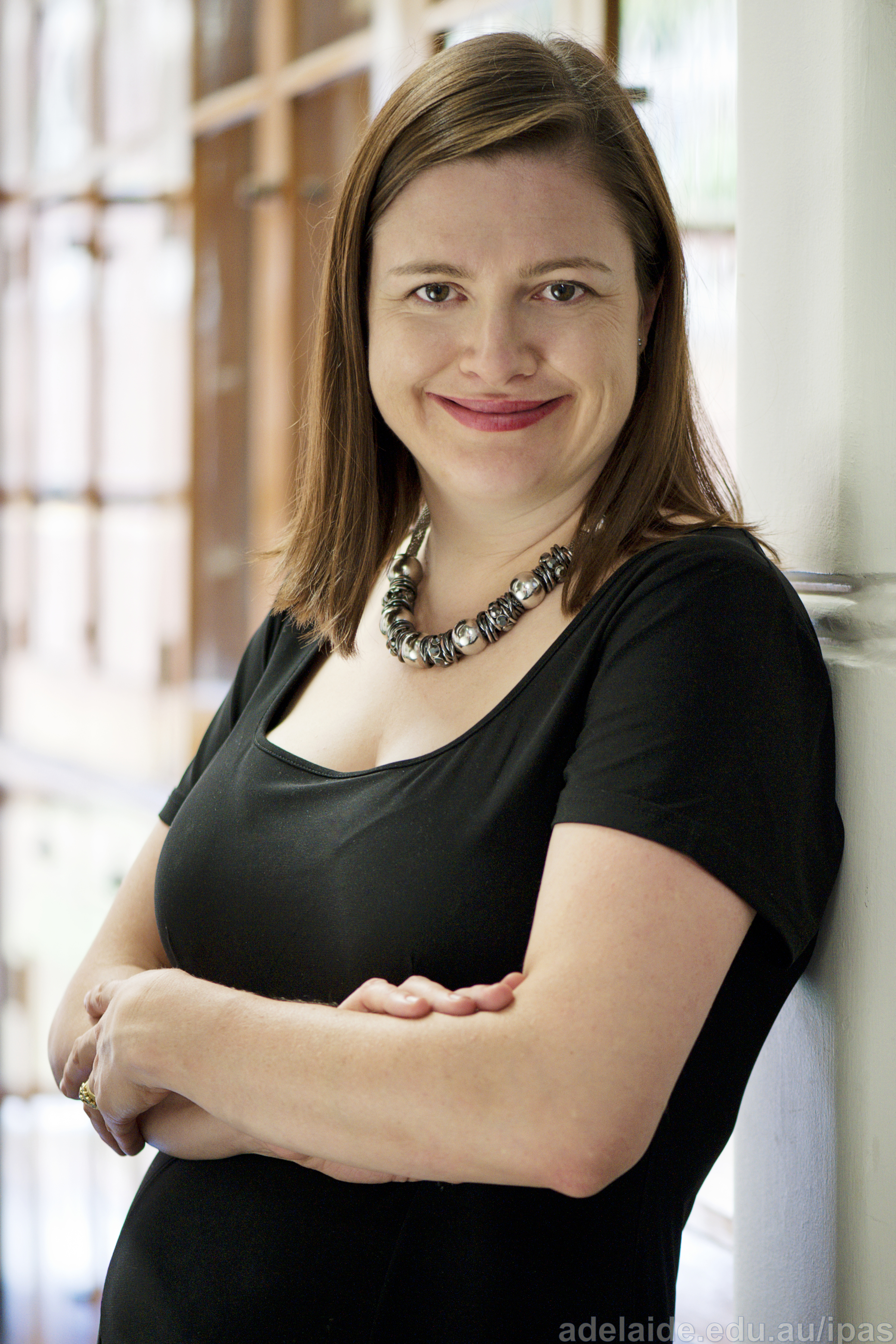
Tanya Monro, EDB Member

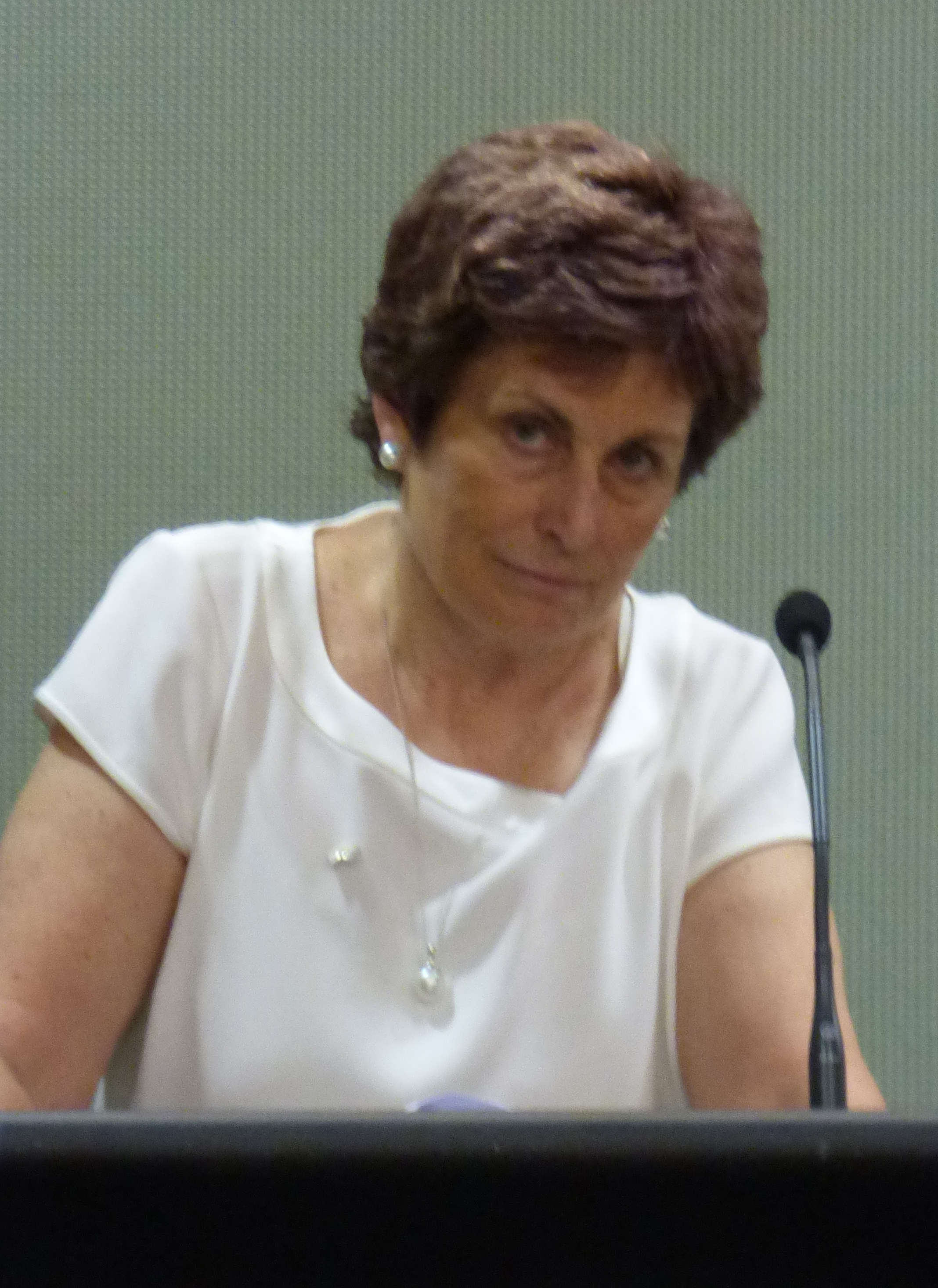
Dr Leanna Read, EDB Member

At 6 February 2017, the membership of the board was composed of:

- Raymond Spencer, Chair
- David Knox, Deputy Chair
- Terry Burgess
- Sue Chase
- David Garrard
- Jodi Glass
- Lily Jacobs
- The Hon. Rob Kerin
- Professor David Lloyd
- Professor Tanya Monro
- Julianne Parkinson, executive director, Office of the Economic Development Board
- Dr Leanna Read
- Professor Göran Roos
- Darren Thomas
- Dr Mike Rungie
- Dr Don Russell (ex-officio member)

== Former members ==
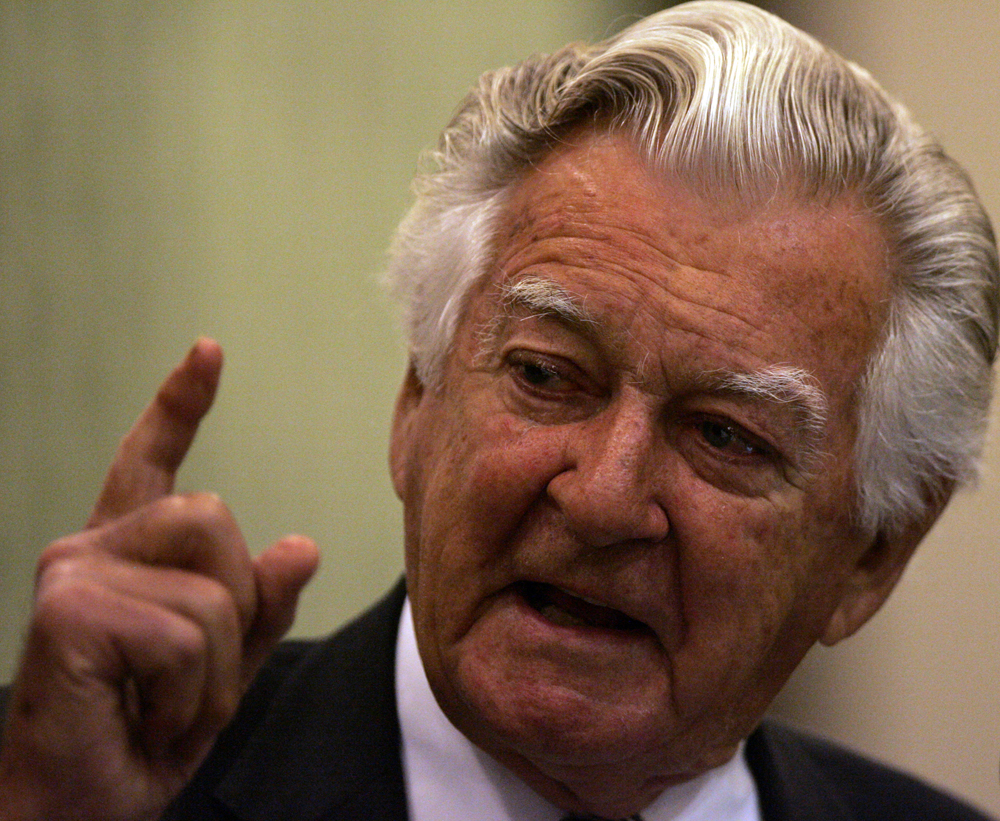
Bob Hawke, former Honorary EDB Member

Former members of the EDB include:

- Cheryl Bart
- John Bastian
- Grant Belchamber
- Monsignor David Cappo AO (ex-officio)
- Bruce Carter
- Robert Champion de Crespigny (chair)
- Rob Chapman (deputy chair)
- Maurice Crotti
- Tim Flannery
- Andrew Fletcher
- Dr Ian Gould
- Jim Hallion (ex-officio)
- Hon Bob Hawke AC (Honorary member)
- Caroline Hewson
- Michael Hickinbotham
- Scott Hicks
- Dr Michael Keating
- Justin Milne
- The Rt Hon Mike Moore
- Corrine Namblard
- Dr Helen Nugent AO
- Kevin Osborn
- Professor Barbara Pocock
- Fiona Roche
- David Simmons
- Peter Wylie
- Bill Wood
- Lance Worrall (ex-officio)
