= Ian Chessell =

Australian physicist

Ian Chessell FTSE

2nd Chief Scientist of South Australia
- In office March 2008 – 2010
- Premier: Mike Rann
- Preceded by: Max Brennan
- Succeeded by: Don Bursill

8th Chief Defence Scientist
- In office 2000–2003
- Preceded by: Richard Brabin-Smith
- Succeeded by: Roger Lough

Personal details
- Born: Charles Ian Chessell
- Scientific career
- Education: University of Melbourne Ph.D. 1970
- Fields: Physics
- Thesis: Radio investigations of the lower ionosphere (1970)

Ian Chessell is an Australian physicist.

== Early life and education ==
Ian Chessell studied at the University of Melbourne, completing his Ph.D. in physics studying radio transmission of the lower ionosphere in 1970.

== Career ==
Chessell commenced work at the Defence Science and Technology Group on completion of his Ph.D., eventually rising to head the organisation as Chief Defence Scientist from 2000 to 2003.

He was Chief Defence Scientist of Australia from 2000 to 2003. He was appointed as Chief Scientist of South Australia in March 2008, and served in that capacity until 2010.

Chessell was appointed a director of Astronomy Australia Limited in November 2010, reappointed in November 2013, and retired in November 2016.

In 2015, he was also a member of the Defence South Australia Advisory Board, the Board of QinetiQ. He was the founding chair of the Goyder Institute for Water Research in 2010, holding the position for five years.

Government offices
Preceded by Max Brennan	Chief Scientist of South Australia; 2008–2010	Succeeded by Don Bursill
Preceded by Richard Brabin-Smith	Chief Defence Scientist of Australia; 2000–2003	Succeeded by Roger Lough
