= Anthony Owen =

Economist and academic in Australia

Anthony 'Tony' David Owen is an economist and academic, currently employed as Emeritus Professor in Energy Economics at University College London Australia. He was appointed to the position in July 2013, and was previously Academic Director of the School of Energy and Resources at its campus in Adelaide, Australia. He also held the Santos Chair in Energy Resources at the time. He previously held positions at Curtin University of Technology and the University of New South Wales, and worked as a consultant and visiting appointee in North America, Europe and Asia. In 2007 he chaired the Inquiry into Electricity Supply in New South Wales. Owen wrote a book entitled The economics of uranium, which was published by Praeger in 1985. Since then, Owen has written periodically on the possibility of nuclear power in Australia, including for the Committee for Economic Development of Australia in 2011. His academic papers have featured in peer-reviewed journals such as Energy Policy, Economic Record, Agenda and the Journal of Nuclear Research and Development. He also edited the book The Economics of Climate Change with Nick Hanley which was published by Routledge, London in 2004.

== Career ==
Owen has worked at the Organisation for Economic Co-operation and Development (Paris, France), the Department of Energy (Harwell, UK), and the International Energy Agency (Paris, France). His academic career has included appointments as Professor of Energy Economics at Curtin University of Technology (Perth, Australia), Associate Professor of Economics and Joint Director of the Centre for Energy and Environmental Markets at the University of New South Wales (Sydney, Australia). He has held visiting appointments at universities in British Columbia (Canada), Colorado (USA) and Leeds and Exeter (UK) and has consulted on energy matters in Australia, China, Denmark, Indonesia, Norway, the Philippines and the UK.

In 2011, Owen contributed a chapter on the economics of nuclear power to Australia's nuclear options, which was published by the Committee for Economic Development of Australia.

== Education ==
Owen has a PhD in econometrics from the University of Kent (UK) which he received in 1972.

== Memberships ==
Tony is a Fellow of the Royal Statistical Society, a member of the CSIRO Advisory Council on Energy and Transport and a former president (2004) of the International Association for Energy Economics.

== Publications ==
- A D Owen, S Simons, and J Brown, “Levelised cost analysis of uranium enrichment facilities in Australia”, Journal of Nuclear Research and Development, 2013, Vol. 6, pp. 3–12.
- A D Owen, “The economic viability of nuclear power in a fossil-fuel-rich country: Australia”, Energy Policy, 2011, Vol. 39, pp. 1305–1311.
- A D Owen and R Betz, “The implications of Australia's Carbon Pollution Reduction Scheme for its National Electricity Market”, Energy Policy, 2010, Vol. 38, pp. 4966–4977.
- A D Owen and C Manuhutu, “Gas-on-gas competition in Shanghai”, Energy Policy, 2010, Vol. 38, pp. 2101–2106.
- A D Owen and J Pope, “Emission trading schemes: potential revenue effects, compliance costs and overall tax policy issues”, Energy Policy, 2009, Vol. 37, pp. 4595–4603.
- A D Owen, “The Inquiry into Electricity Supply in New South Wales”, Energy Policy, 2009, Vol. 37, 2009, pp. 570–576.
- A D Owen and C Cockroft, “The Economics of Hydrogen Fuel Cell Buses”, Economic Record, Vol. 83, 2007, pp. 359–370.

== Personal life ==
Owen is a former rugby player.
