= Göran Roos =

Nils Göran Arne Roos is a Swedish academic, technologist, author and businessman. He is a specialist in the field of intellectual capital and an expert in innovation management and strategy. He was appointed Thinker in Residence on industry development by the Government of South Australia in 2011, and subsequently moved to the state's Economic Development Board, where he serves as a member. Amongst a number of other positions, he is also a member of the Flinders University Council. Roos was named one of the 13 most influential thinkers for the 21st century by the Spanish business journal Direccion y Progreso.

== Career ==
Roos is the founder of Intellectual Capital Services Ltd, a technology and business futures think-tank. He has co-authored many of the company's research publications. In 2013 he founded the private company Innovation Performance Australia Pty. Ltd. Roos also sits on the board of Seeley International.

His research work in South Australia as thinker in residence resulted in the Manufacturing into the Future report, which laid the foundation for South Australia's subsequent industrial development strategy, Manufacturing Works. One of Roos' public presentations, entitled The future of manufacturing in Australia: Innovation and productivity featured in the CEDA's Top Ten Speeches of 2013.

Roos remains based in South Australia, where he holds positions of influence on a number of government boards, advisory groups and councils at state and federal levels. As of 2015, his memberships include:

- Advanced Manufacturing Council in Adelaide - Chair
- Economic Development Board (South Australia) - Value Add and Industrial Growth Sub-Committee
- Council for Flinders University
- International Advisory Group (IAG) for DesignGov - Australian Centre for Excellence in Public Sector Design
- CSIRO's Manufacturing Sector Advisory Council
- Australian Design Integration Network (ADIN) - Founding member
- Fellow of the Australian Academy of Technological Sciences and Engineering

Roos has held a number of academic positions internationally. His academic positions as of October 2014 include:

- Stretton Fellow appointed by the City of Playford at University of Adelaide
- Professor in Strategic Design in the Faculty of Design at Swinburne University of Technology
- Adjunct Professor at Mawson Institute at University of South Australia
- Adjunct Professor at Entrepreneurship, Innovation and Commercialisation Centre at the University of Adelaide
- Adjunct Professor at University of Technology Sydney Business School
- Adjunct Professor at Nanyang Business School, Nanyang Technological University in Singapore

He is a former honorary professor at Warwick Business School and visiting professor of intangible asset management and performance measurement at the Centre for Business Performance at Cranfield University in the United Kingdom. He is also a former visiting professor of innovation management and business model innovation at VTT Technical Research Centre of Finland, where he was also a member of the board and chairman of the board (VTT International). He has also been a senior advisor to Aalto Executive Education Academy, a part-time visiting intellectual capital adjunct at Melbourne Business School, Mt. Eliza Centre for Executive Education, and part-time industrial professor of strategy and internationalisation at BI Norwegian Business School in Oslo.

He is also a former member of the Australian Prime Minister's Manufacturing Leaders Group.

In his combined academic and professional life, Roos has advised government bodies in Australia, Austria, Denmark, Finland, Norway, Spain and the United Kingdom on matters of "strategy, research and development, national and regional innovation systems issues, knowledge management and intellectual capital." He has also consulted with the private sector.

Roos is a published author of over 100 books, articles and case studies.

== Defence interests ==
Roos undertook national service in Sweden, where he attained the rank of major in the reserve with the third cavalry regiment of the Swedish Armed Forces. He has provided advice to various governments, helping to shape their defence innovation and research strategies. He has also taught at the Defence Academy of the United Kingdom.

In Australia, Roos has made a number of contributions to debate regarding the Future Submarine project. For example, he has asked whether Australia's sovereign capability could be compromised if its next fleet of submarines is built off-shore and has questioned whether a foreign manufacturer would be willing to hand over its intellectual property if it were awarded the contract. Roos has also published articles on the economic cost of an off-shore build, questioning the federal government's apparent eagerness to purchase submarines from another country, rather than committing to building them in South Australia. He has written at least six articles on the topic for The Conversation.

In 2013, Roos supported students of the South Australian Defence Industry Leadership Program (SADILP) in the preparation of a paper entitled "A Nuclear Future for South Australia".

In 2014, Roos' expenditure of public funds during his work as a state government contractor attracted some controversy. The Opposition claimed that Roos had spent almost $40,000 during the period October–November 2013. The state government rejected the controversy, calling it "petty payback from the Liberal Party" following Roos' involvement in the submarine debate.

In January 2017, Roos was appointed to the Defence SA Advisory Board.
