= Pangea Resources =

Pangea Resources Australia Pty Ltd was a company notable for a proposal for an international high-level radioactive waste repository in Australia.

Pangea Resources was a joint venture of British Nuclear Fuels Limited, Golder Associates and Swiss radioactive waste management entity Nagra. James "Jim" W. Voss was the company's managing director.

In 1998-1999 it put forward a proposal for a high level radioactive waste repository to be built in remote central Australia. The proposal was highly controversial, and elicited opposition from Australian state and federal parliaments. This included actions by two parliaments to prevent the progress of such a proposal. These were the Western Australian Parliament's passage of the Nuclear Waste Storage (Prohibition) Act 1999, and the South Australian Parliament's implementation of the Nuclear Waste Storage Facility (Prohibition) Act 2000.

The anti-nuclear movement in Australia lobbied against the idea of such a facility. When the federal minister responsible for the issue, Minister for Industry Science and Resources Senator Nick Minchin, indicated that ‘the Pangea proposal will go nowhere’, Pangea ultimately abandoned its advocacy.
