= Tanya Monro =

Australian physicist

Tanya Monro AC FAA FTSE
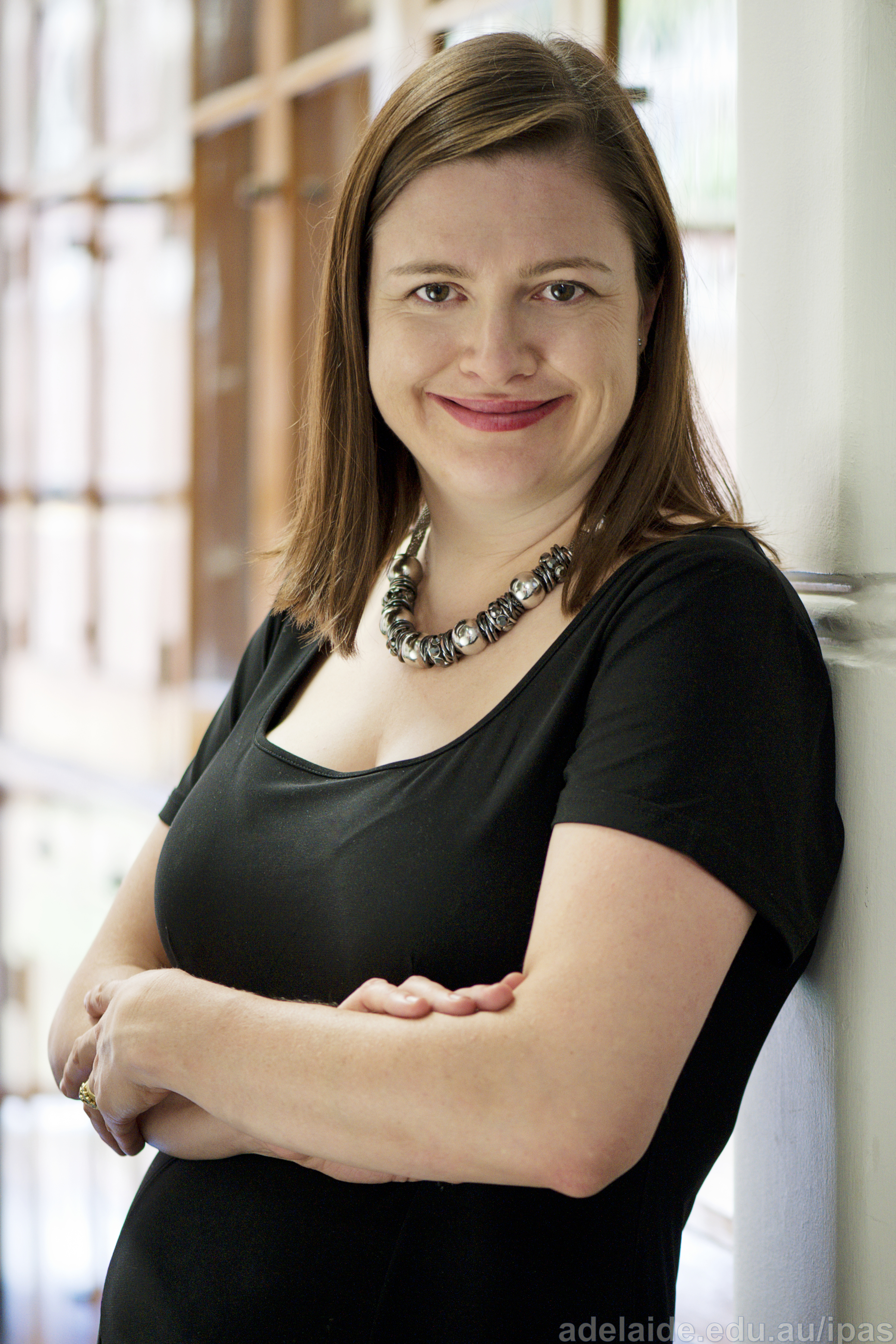
- Monro in 2011
- Born: Tanya Mary Feletto; 1973 (age 52–53)
- Education: University of Sydney
- Occupation: Physicist
- Awards: Royal Society University Research Fellowship (1998); Georgina Sweet Fellowship (2013)
- Scientific career
- Fields: Physics; Optical physics; Photonics
- Workplaces: Defence Science and Technology Group; University of South Australia; University of Adelaide; University of Southampton
- Thesis: Self-written waveguides (1998)
- Website: www.adelaide.edu.au/directory/tanya.monro

Tanya Mary Monro AC (born 1973) is an Australian physicist known for her work in photonics. She has been Australia's Chief Defence Scientist since 8 March 2019. Prior to that, she was the Deputy Vice Chancellor, Research and Innovation (DVCR&I) at the University of South Australia. She was awarded the ARC Georgina Sweet Australian Laureate Fellowship in 2013. She was the inaugural director of the Institute for Photonics & Advanced Sensing (IPAS) (now known as the School of Physical Sciences). Monro has remained an adjunct professor of physics at the University of Adelaide following her departure from the institution. In 2020, she was awarded the title of Emeritus Professor at the University of South Australia.

Her previous board roles have included membership of the Australian Prime Minister's Commonwealth Science Council, the South Australian Economic Development Board, and the Defence SA board.

== Education ==
Monro was awarded a Bachelor of Science degree with first-class honours in 1995 followed by a PhD in 1998 from the University of Sydney for research on waveguides. Monro credits a teacher at Sydney Church of England Girls Grammar with inspiring her interest in physics.

== Career and research ==
From 1998 to 2004, Monro was a Royal Society University Research Fellowship at the Optoelectronics Research Centre (ORC) at the University of Southampton. She joined the University of Adelaide in 2005 as inaugural chair of photonics and Director of the Centre of Expertise in Photonics (CoEP) within the School of Chemistry & Physics in partnership with DSTO. Since that time and while at the University of Adelaide she has been: ARC Federation Fellow; Director of the Institute for Photonics & Advanced Sensing (IPAS) and the Director of the ARC Centre of Excellence in Nanoscale Biophotonics at the University of Adelaide. From 2014 to 2019 she was the Deputy Vice Chancellor and Vice President, Research and Innovation at the University of South Australia.

=== Chief Defence Scientist (2019–present) ===
Monro was announced as Australia's next Chief Defence Scientist on 24 January 2019. Monro took up the role of Chief Defence Scientist in March 2019, the first woman in this position. In this role, she heads the Defence Science and Technology Group and serves as Defence's Capability Manager for Innovation, Science and Technology.

During her tenure, Defence released and implemented the mission-directed S&T framework known as More, together: Defence Science and Technology Strategy 2030, which established the Science, Technology and Research (STaR) Shots to focus effort on leap-ahead capabilities, including Remote Undersea Surveillance and Quantum-Assured Position, Navigation and Timing (PNT).

== Publications ==
Monro has published a few book chapters, and is named on 275 papers (Monro is first and/or sole author in only 40 of these papers), including refereed journal articles and conference papers. These have led to more than 21000 citations in journals and refereed conference proceedings. Monro has also registered a number of patent families, although not one of these patent families have resulted in any commercial applications or uses – as is typical of blue sky researchers.

== Honours and awards ==
- 1998: The Bragg Gold Medal for Excellence in Physics for the best PhD thesis by a student from an Australian university
- 2006: Bright Spark Award (for Australia's Top 10 Scientific Minds under 45 – Cosmos Magazine)
- 2012: Pawsey Medal
- 2015: Eureka Prize for Excellence in Interdisciplinary Scientific Research
- 2019: South Australian award winner of The Australian Awards for Excellence in Women's Leadership.
- 2020: Awarded the title of Emeritus Professor at the University of South Australia.
- 2022: Appointed Companion of the Order of Australia in the 2022 Queen's Birthday Honours for "eminent service to scientific and technological development, to research and innovation, to tertiary education, particularly in the field of photonics, and to professional organisations".

== Professional associations ==
- Fellow, Optical Society of America (FOSA)
- Fellow, Australian Academy of Science (FAA)
- Bragg Fellow, RI Aus (Royal Institution Australia)

== Personal life ==
Monro was raised in the Sydney suburb of Bankstown. She is an alumna of the National Youth Science Forum, a youth camp at the Australian National University students wishing to pursue a career in science. She married David in 1995. They moved to England in 1998. They have three sons, the first born in 2003, followed by twin boys born in 2006. Monro is a science fiction fan, and played cello in the Burnside Symphony Orchestra in Adelaide.

Government offices
Preceded by Alex Zelinsky	Chief Defence Scientist of Australia; 2019–	Incumbent
