= Roger Holmes (academic) =

Roger S Holmes (born 1943) is an Australian geneticist and former academic administrator. He served as Vice-Chancellor of the University of Newcastle from 1996 to 2004.

== Education ==
Holmes obtained his PhD from the University of Queensland in 1967 and a higher doctorate (DSc) from Griffith University in 1978.

== Career ==
His research included biochemical, genetic, evolutionary and bioinformatic studies of several vertebrate gene families.

Holmes was a lecturer/senior lecturer posts at La Trobe University from 1970 to 1974. He held various academic positions at Griffith University from 1974 to 1995 including as a professor.

Holmes currently works as a research consultant at Texas Biomedical Research Institute in San Antonio, Texas.
