= Craig T. Simmons =

Australian hydrogeologist

Craig T. Simmons is an Australian hydrogeologist and was named South Australia's Scientist of the Year in 2015.

== Career ==
Simmons began working at Flinders University in 1997 at the age of 25. He went on to establish the National Centre for Groundwater Research and Training in 2009 and was appointed the inaugural Schultz Chair in the Environment at Flinders University, South Australia. In August 2015, Simmons was named South Australian Scientist of the Year. As of August 2015, Simmons is also The Advertiser's official scientist in residence. He is a member of the Statutory Independent Expert Scientific Committee on Coal Seam Gas and Large Coal Mine Development (IESC).

In 2012, Simmons described groundwater as "literally, buried treasure, and it is time Australians saw it that way." He was elected a Fellow of the Australian Academy of Science in 2022.

In 2024 Simmons was appointed as Chief Scientist for South Australia for a three-year term.

Academic offices
Preceded by Caroline McMillen	Chief Scientist of South Australia; 2024–present	Incumbent
