= Kelvin Kong =

First Indigenous Australian surgeon

Dr. Kelvin Kong AM
- Born: 1976 (age 49–50); Taiping, Perak, Malaysia
- Citizenship: Australia
- Education: University of New South Wales
- Occupation: Otorhinolaryngologist
- Years active: 2007-present
- Organization: University of Newcastle
- Known for: First Indigenous Australian surgeon
- Children: 3

Kelvin Kong AM (born 1976) is an Australian doctor who is the first formally recognised Indigenous surgeon and a recipient of the Medal of the Order of Australia. He is an ear, nose and throat surgeon (ENT) and is known for his work in middle ear disease and First Nations healthcare in Australia.

== Early life ==
Kong was born in 1976 in Taiping, Perak, and is of Chinese and Aboriginal ancestry. His mother, Grace Kinsella, is a Worimi woman from Port Stephens in the Australian state of New South Wales (NSW) and became one of the earliest Indigenous registered nurses in the 1960s, while his father, Kong Cheok Seng, is Chinese Malaysian and a doctor. Kong has two older sisters, who are twins.

Kong's parents met in Australia while his father was studying medicine at the University of New South Wales, but due to the White Australia policy in effect at the time, his father was not able to migrate to Australia permanently. His mother was also not able to move to Malaysia. Eventually, his parents separated and Kong moved to Port Stephens to live with his mother full-time.

Kong experienced racism in Australia starting in childhood, both due to being Chinese and being First Nations. Other children at school were confused about his ethnicity and questioned his identity, feeling his "features were a puzzle".

== Education ==
Like his father, Kong studied medicine at the University of New South Wales in the 1990s. During this time, he visited remote communities in New South Wales, which led him to notice the significant prevalence of otitis media (middle ear infection) in these communities. In some communities he visited, Kong said the prevalence of otitis media was up to 85%. When left untreated, this condition can have an ongoing effect on the burden of disease in the community, as it can cause hearing loss. In Australia, Indigenous people aged seven and older have a 43% prevalence of hearing loss in one or both ears.

In 2007, Kong became the first Indigenous Fellow of the Royal Australasian College of Surgeons (RACS). He is not the first recognised Indigenous doctor, but rather the first recognised Indigenous surgeon; other First Nations people had become medical doctors before Kong, including both of his older sisters.

== Career ==
Kong is a professor at the University of Newcastle in their School of Medicine and Public Health.

Kong was previously a Board Director of the Australian Indigenous Doctors’ Association (AIDA).

As of 2023, Kong was employed as an ENT surgeon at John Hunter Hospital in Newcastle, on Awabakal country. Working with the Hunter Medical Research Institute, Kong has also conducted research in children's ear infections and hearing loss. He has been a contributor to journal articles on the topic of otitis media since 2007 and is still active in the field as of 2026.

== Awards and honours ==
Kong was a nominee for NSW Australian of the Year in 2023, for his work in treating and raising awareness of the high rates of middle ear infection in First Nations people. He was the recipient of the NAIDOC Person of the Year Award in 2023.

In 2024, Kong was awarded a Membership of the Order of Australia, for “significant service to medicine as an Otolaryngologist, and to Indigenous health".

In 2026, Kong was selected to write and deliver the Wang Gangwu Lecture, an annual televised speech given at Parliament House, which focuses on the contributions of Chinese Australians to the country of Australia and its citizens. During the speech, he discussed the sacrifices made by both his Chinese and Aboriginal ancestors, and the ongoing impact of racism towards Chinese Australians and racism towards Indigenous peoples.

== Political views ==
Kong publicly supported the 'Yes' vote for the 2023 Australian Voice to Parliament referendum, advocating for the implementation of an Indigenous Voice to Parliament.

Kong has said that while Australia Day (also known as Invasion Day) offers an opportunity to celebrate Australians, he believes that "the day is the wrong date", referring to the event being celebrated on 26 January, the anniversary of Australia's colonisation.

== Personal life ==
Kong is married to his wife, Kiara. They have three children: two sons and one daughter.
