= Lisa Wood (academic) =

Australian biochemist

Lisa Wood is an Australian nutritional biochemist and academic known for her research on the links between diet, inflammation, and respiratory diseases such as asthma. She is the Pro Vice-Chancellor of the College of Health, Medicine and Well-being at the University of Newcastle, Australia, and also serves as the nutrition theme leader in the Immune Health Program at the Hunter Medical Research Institute (HRMI). Wood’s work has demonstrated how dietary factors can influence lung inflammation and has informed clinical guidelines in asthma care. She is a former President of the Nutrition Society of Australia and has received multiple awards for her contributions to medical science.

== Early life and education ==
Wood completed a Bachelor of Science with Honours at the University of Sydney, where she was awarded the University Medal in 1991. After working for six years in the food industry with MasterFoods Australia, she pursued postgraduate research. She earned her PhD in Nutrition and Dietetics from the University of Newcastle in 2001, with a dissertation examining the relationship between antioxidants and oxidative stress in cystic fibrosis patients. This doctoral research marked the beginning of her focus on how nutritional factors affect respiratory health.

== Career ==
Following her PhD, Wood undertook postdoctoral research in respiratory medicine at the Hunter Medical Research Institute from 2002 to 2006. During this period, she investigated how dietary components, such as antioxidants, could modulate inflammation in airway diseases like asthma. In 2007, she was awarded the University of Newcastle’s Gladys M. Brawn Career Development Fellowship to extend her work on the roles of dietary fats and obesity as promoters of airway inflammation.

Wood joined the academic staff of the University of Newcastle’s School of Biomedical Sciences and Pharmacy in 2010 and subsequently rose to the rank of full professor. She served as Head of School from 2020 to 2025, overseeing education and research programs in biomedical and pharmaceutical sciences. In late 2023, she took on a short-term role as interim Pro Vice-Chancellor (Student Engagement) at the university. In February 2025, Wood was appointed to the board of the Hunter Medical Research Institute. In March 2025, Wood was appointed Pro Vice-Chancellor of the College of Health, Medicine and Well-being.

In addition to her university roles, Wood has been active in professional organizations. She was Vice-President of the Nutrition Society of Australia from 2016 to 2017 and President from 2018 to 2019. She has also contributed to respiratory health organizations; she serves as Chair of the Research Advisory Committee for Asthma Australia, helping to shape national research priorities for asthma. Wood has been involved with the Thoracic Society of Australia and New Zealand, including serving as convenor of its Asthma and Allergy Special Interest Group (2011–2015) and in 2025 became a fellow of the society. She is a registered nutritionist and has held editorial board roles for academic journals such as Respirology and Nutrients, further contributing to her fields of expertise.

== Research and impact ==
Wood’s research centers on how diet and nutrition can affect chronic airway diseases and inflammation. Early in her career, she studied antioxidant levels in cystic fibrosis patients, finding links between nutritional status and lung function. Much of her work has focused on asthma: she has demonstrated that dietary habits can directly influence asthma control and airway inflammation. In one clinical trial, Wood and colleagues showed that asthma patients who consumed a high fruit and vegetable diet had significantly fewer asthma exacerbations (attacks) over a three-month period compared to those with a low intake of fruits and vegetables. Wood’s research has also explored the impact of obesity on asthma; she was among the first to describe the heightened inflammatory profile in the airways of obese asthma patients, and she demonstrated that weight loss in obese individuals can lead to improved asthma control and lung function. Another area of her work involves dietary fiber: her team has investigated how soluble fiber fermentation in the gut produces short-chain fatty acids that have anti-inflammatory effects, and their pilot studies indicated that increasing dietary fiber intake could improve asthma symptoms and airway inflammation.

Several of Wood's scientific publications have been cited in national and international asthma management guidelines, including the Australian Asthma Handbook and the Global Initiative for Asthma (GINA) guidelines. To date, she has published over 200 peer-reviewed journal articles and has attracted more than A$18 million in research funding through competitive grants and industry partnerships. Her findings have raised awareness of “food as medicine” in respiratory conditions and opened new avenues for non-pharmacological interventions in asthma and other inflammatory diseases.

== Public engagement ==
Wood has written articles for general audiences explaining how healthier diets can benefit respiratory conditions, emphasizing that eating a diet rich in fruits and vegetables can help people with asthma breathe easier. A University of Newcastle release in 2014 highlighted her study linking poor-quality, high-fat diets to worse asthma symptoms, bringing wider attention to the connection between nutrition and asthma management.

== Awards and honours ==
- 1991 – University Medal, University of Sydney (for academic excellence in undergraduate science studies)
- 2007 – NSW & ACT Young Tall Poppy Science Award (recognising outstanding early-career scientists in New South Wales and the Australian Capital Territory)
- 2018 – Hunter Medical Research Institute Director’s Award for Mid-Career Research
- 2022 – Nutrition Society of Australia Research Medal (for excellence in nutrition science research)
