= Indigenous Nationals =

- Formerly: National Indigenous Tertiary Education Student Games (NITESG)
- Founded: 1996
- No. of teams: 43
- Headquarters: Brisbane, Queensland
- Region: Australia
- Website: www.unisport.com.au/indigenous-nationals

The Indigenous Nationals is a multi-sport event held annually between the 43 Australian universities and tertiary institutions. Overseen by UniSport Australia, the peak governing body of university sport in Australia. Only Indigenous Australians are allowed to compete.

== History ==
13 students of the Wollotuka Institute (University of Newcastle) were enrolled in a Diploma of Aboriginal Studies (Community Recreation). These students created the National Indigenous Tertiary Education Student Games (NITESG).

The University of Western Australia has been the most successful amongst competing universities in the Nationals, having achieved Overall Winner a total of seven times (2001, 2002, 2004, 2008, 2009 2013, 2014).

== Results ==
| Year | Host City | Host University | Overall winner |
|---|---|---|---|
| 1996 | Newcastle | Wollotuka Institute (University of Newcastle) | Malu (Western Sydney University) |
| 1997 | Sydney | Yooroang Garang (Western Sydney University) | Yooroang Garang (Western Sydney University) |
| 1998 | Sydney | Yooroang Garang (Western Sydney University) | Yooroang Garang (Western Sydney University) |
| 1999 | Newcastle | Wollotuka Institute (University of Newcastle) | Goolanguilla (Western Sydney University) |
| 2000 | Canberra | Ngunnawal Centre (University of Canberra) | Bathurst (Charles Sturt University) |
| 2001 | | Bathurst (Charles Sturt University) | University of Western Australia |
| 2002 | Perth | University of Western Australia | University of Western Australia |
| 2003 | Sydney | University of New South Wales | University of Technology Sydney & University of Sydney |
| 2004 | Sydney | Koori Centre (University of Sydney) | University of Western Australia |
| 2005 | Newcastle | Wollotuka Institute (University of Newcastle) | Oodgeroo (Queensland University of Technology) |
| 2006 | | Gumurrii Centre (Griffith University | Wollotuka Institute (University of Newcastle) |
| 2007 | Wollongong | Woolyungah Indigenous Centre (University of Wollongong) | Woolyungah Indigenous Centre (University of Wollongong) |
| 2008 | Perth | University of Western Australia | University of Western Australia |
| 2009 | Canberra | Ngunnawal Centre (University of Canberra) | University of Western Australia |
| 2010 | Newcastle | Wollotuka Institute (University of Newcastle) | Marru Barak (University of Melbourne) |
| 2011 | Melbourne | Marru Barak (University of Melbourne) | Marru Barak (University of Melbourne) |
| 2012 | Cairns | Cairns (James Cook University) | Cairns (James Cook University) |
| 2013 | Sydney | Western Sydney University | University of Western Australia |
| 2014 | Perth | University of Western Australia | University of Western Australia |
| 2015 | Newcastle | Wollotuka Institute (University of Newcastle) | Wollotuka Institute (University of Newcastle) |
| 2016 | Brisbane | Brisbane (Australian Catholic University) | Oodgeroo (Queensland University of Technology) |
| 2017 | Melbourne | Geelong (Deakin University) | Wollotuka Institute (University of Newcastle) |
| 2018 | Sydney | Walanga Muru (Macquarie University) | Marru Barak (University of Melbourne) |
| 2019 | Perth | University of Western Australia | University of Technology Sydney |
| 2020 | Tournament canceled due to the COVID-19 outbreak | | |
| 2021 | Newcastle | Wollotuka Institute (University of Newcastle) | Australian Catholic University |
| 2022 | Brisbane | Oodgeroo (Queensland University of Technology) | Australian Catholic University |
| 2023 | Melbourne | Marru Barak (University of Melbourne) | University of Queensland |
| 2024 | Wollongong | Woolyungah Indigenous Centre (University of Wollongong) | Wollotuka Institute (University of Newcastle) |
| 2025 | Perth | University of Western Australia | Wollotuka Institute (University of Newcastle) |
| 2026 | Newcastle | Wollotuka Institute (University of Newcastle) | |
