= Clare Collins =

Australian dietician

Clare Collins AO FRSN FAHMS
- Born: Clare Elizabeth Collins; 9 November 1960
- Education: University of Sydney; Griffith University; University of Newcastle (PhD)
- Scientific career
- Fields: Nutrition; Diet; Public health Obesity eHealth
- Workplaces: University of Newcastle
- Thesis: Optimising energy intake in cystic fibrosis : a study of growth, dietary intake and satiety (1999)
- Website: newcastle.edu.au/profile/clare-collins

Clare Elizabeth Collins is an Australian dietician who is Professor of Nutrition and Dietetics at the University of Newcastle. She serves as Director for Research in the School of Health Sciences and Deputy Director of the Priority Research Centre. She was awarded the 2017 Hunter Medical Research Institute Researcher of the Year and is a Fellow of Dietitians Australia.

== Early life and education ==
Clare was born and raised in Brisbane, Queensland. Her early education was at St Pius X Salisbury followed by Our Lady’s Annerley. Collins studied dietetics at Griffith University and graduated in 1981. She joined the University of Sydney for her graduate studies, earning a postgraduate diploma in nutrition in 1982. She worked in the paediatric cystic fibrosis team at John Hunter Children's Hospital, which drove her interest in clinical research. She moved to the University of Newcastle for her doctoral studies and was awarded a PhD in 1999. Her PhD thesis examined the appetite of young people with cystic fibrosis. After finishing her PhD, Collins was made a researcher of Nutrition at the University of Newcastle.

== Research and career ==
Collins works on new technologies to monitor dietary intake. In 2009 she was appointed a team leader for the National Health and Medical Research Council (NHMRC) Australian Dietary Guidelines revision. In 2012 she created the healthy eating quiz, which provided real-time feedback for thousands of Australians. She was awarded the Dietitians Association of Australia (now Dietitians Australia) President's Award for her innovative use of technology. In 2014 she was awarded the University of Newcastle Vice Chancellor's Award for Supervision Excellence. She worked with the National Heart Foundation of Australia to evaluate dietary patterns and heart health. She prepared a report on Dietary Patterns and Cardiovascular Disease Outcomes which looks at the link between dietary intake and cardiovascular disease. She found that the DASH diet was the most beneficial to reduce cardiovascular disease and associated risk factors.

Collins works with the Baylor College of Medicine on the development of web-based programs, video consultations and games themed around health. Collins was awarded a $1.7 million grant from the Bill & Melinda Gates Foundation in 2017. She will investigate Voice Image Sensor technologies for Individual Dietary Assessment (VISIDA), which will assess the food and nutrient intake of people in the developing world. It will incorporate a smartphone app and wearable sensors.

She has contributed to The New Zealand Herald and SBS and regularly appears on the BBC and ABC News. She serves as a Fellow and spokesperson of Dietitians Australia and is on the council for the Australia and New Zealand Obesity Society.

Additionally, she features intermittently on Dr Karl's radio shows/podcasts Science with Dr Karl and Shirtloads of Science.

=== Awards and honours ===
Collins was named the Hunter Medical Research Institute (HMRI) Researcher of the Year in 2017. She was elected Fellow of the Australian Academy of Health and Medical Sciences in 2019 and Fellow of the Royal Society of New South Wales in 2020. In the 2023 Australia Day Honours, Collins was appointed an Officer of the Order of Australia.
