= Wesley College, University of Sydney =

Wesley College
- University of Sydney
- Location: Western Avenue, University of Sydney NSW, 2006
- Coordinates: 33°53′21″S 151°11′09″E
- Full name: Wesley College
- Motto: Ministrate in Fide Vestra Virtutem (Latin)
- Motto in English: Serve Virtue in Your Faith
- Established: 1917
- Named for: John Wesley, the founder of the Methodist Church
- Sister college: Queen's College, University of Melbourne
- Master: Lisa J Sutherland
- Residents: 265
- Website: Website

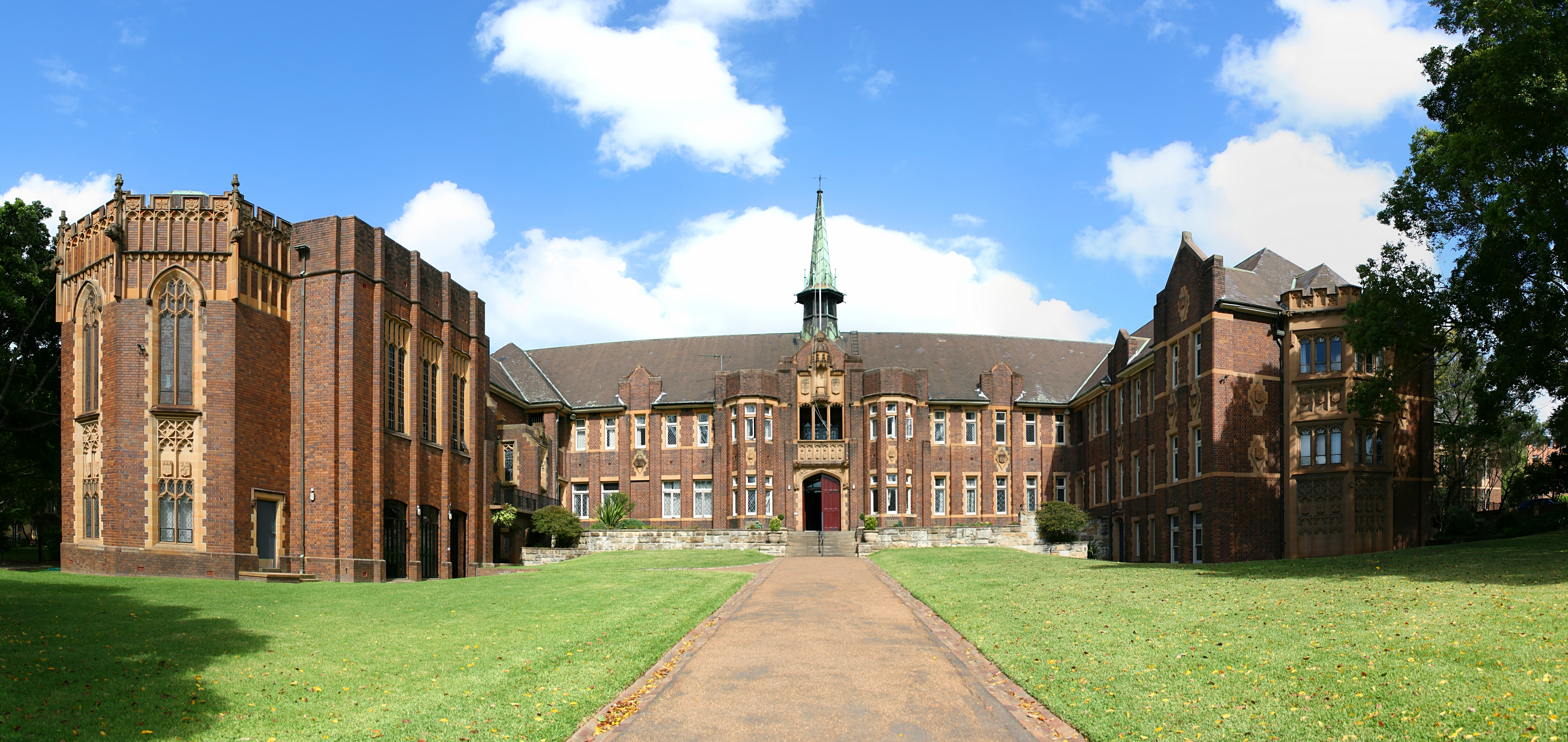
The main entrance and buildings of Wesley College

Wesley College is a co-residential college of 265 students within the University of Sydney. The college occupies a site on the main campus of the University of Sydney and was built on a sub-grant of Crown land. Wesley is one of six on-campus colleges at the University of Sydney which provide accommodation. In 1923 the college averaged 45 students. Originally the college accommodated only men but when women were admitted in 1969 Wesley became the first of the colleges within the University of Sydney to become co-educational. Its current head is Lisa Sutherland, who has held the position since 2010.

The college chapel owned a Latin version of the Bible which dated to 1479, which was at one stage the oldest known Bible in Australia. This bible is on permanent loan to the University of Sydney Library Rare Books and Special Collections under the call number Incunabula 79.2.

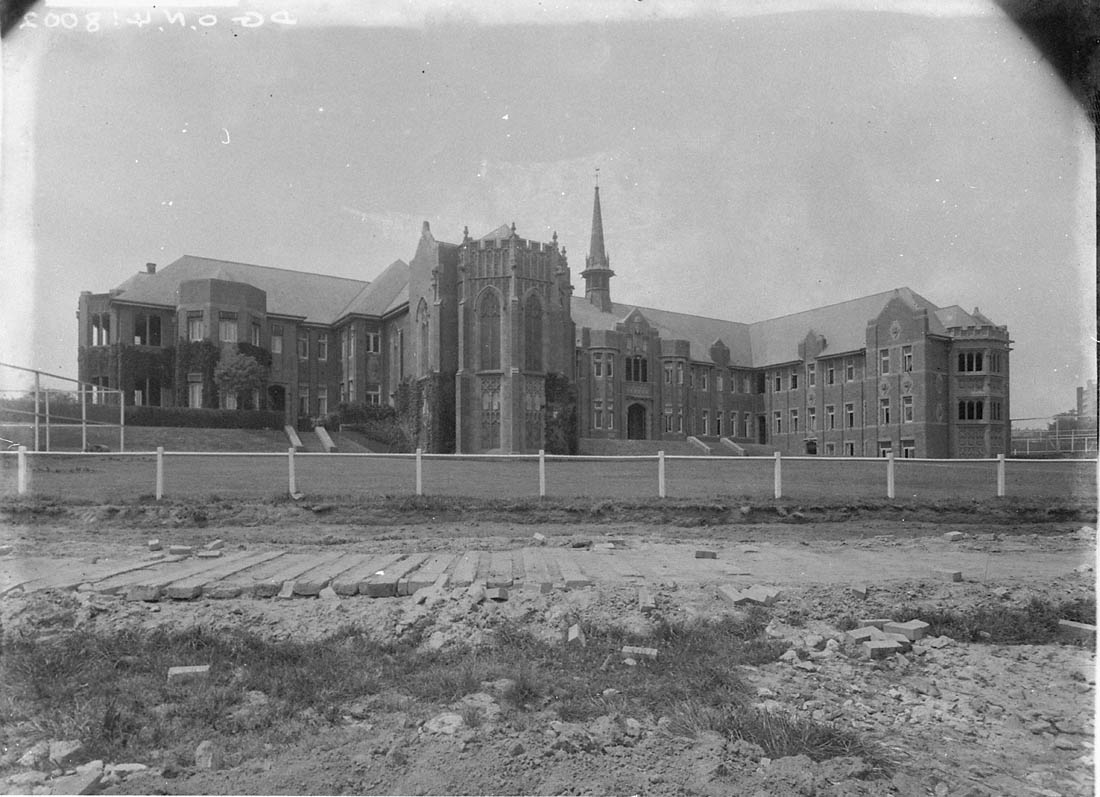
Wesley College in the 1930s.

== Buildings ==
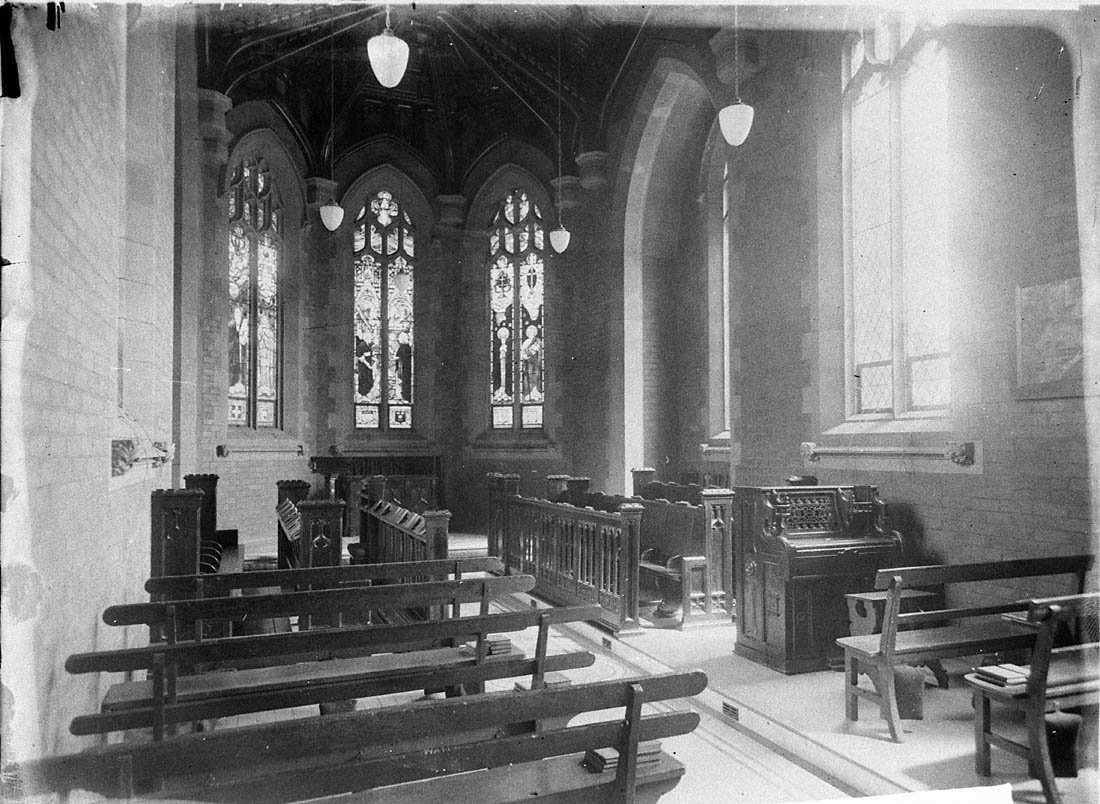
The interior of the Wesley chapel in the 1930s

The Edwardian Gothic main wing of Wesley dates from 1917 and was designed by the winner of a competition, Byera Hadley (1872–1937), an English-born architect who had emigrated to Australia in 1887. Construction of the design was expected to cost £20,000. The brown face brick and sandstone building originally consisted of the central wing, dining room, chapel and Master's residence. It has a steep slate roof and is topped with a copper flèche. The interiors are detailed in a neo-Gothic style with polished timber staircases and wainscotting, leadlight windows and quatrefoil plaster ceilings. The chapel, also designed by Hadley and completed in 1919, was paid for by benefactor Frederick Cull.

In 1922 the building's original design by Hadley was completed with the opening of the Callaghan Wing. Alan Dwyer designed the Cecil Purser Wing in 1943 and in 1960 Brewster Murray added the Wylie Wing. Further extensions were added in 1965 when Fowell, Mansfield & Maclurcan increased the capacity of the chapel and in 1969 when the same firm designed the Tutors Wing.

== Student life ==
=== Rawson Cup ===
Every year, Wesley men compete for the Rawson Cup, which was presented to the Sydney University Sports Union in 1906 by Admiral Sir Harry Rawson, and is the height of male intercollegiate sport. The cup is fought for throughout the year by men representing each of the University of Sydney colleges accumulating points by competing in cricket, rowing, swimming, rugby, tennis, soccer, basketball and athletics. Wesley has won the Rawson Cup on seven occasions.

=== Rosebowl Cup ===
The female sporting trophy, the Rosebowl Cup, has been won by Wesley on more occasions than any other college.

=== Social calendar ===
Students are also in charge of organising their own social calendar throughout the year, including sponsor bars, formal dinners, victory dinners, racing days, as well as the annual Informal (for 1200 people with live bands and DJs) and the annual Black Ball.

== Masters ==
- 1916 (acting) Rev W Woolls Rutledge
- 1916–1923 Rev Michael Scott Fletcher
- 1923–1942 Rev Leslie Bennett
- 1942–1964 Rev Bertram Wyllie
- 1965–1976 Rev Norman Webb
- 1977–1983 Rev James Udy
- 1984–1996 Rev John Whitehead
- 1997–2001 Rev John Evans
- 2002–2009 Rev David Russell
- 2010–present Lisa Sutherland

== Notable alumni ==
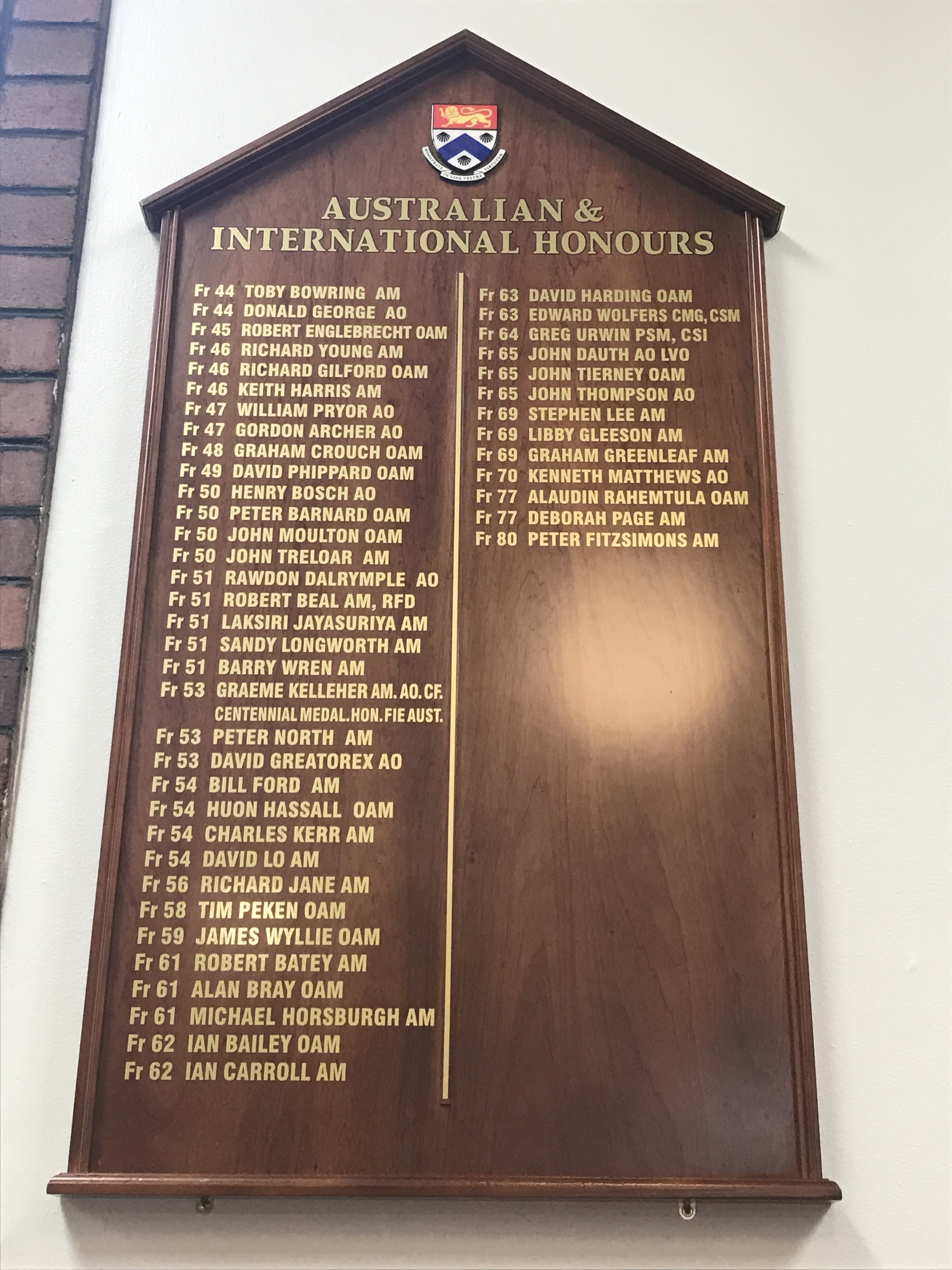
Wesley College honoured alumni (as at 2019)

=== Science, medicine, and academia ===
- Dennis A. Ahlburg, academic and university administrator
- Robyn Alders, veterinarian
- Murray Aitkin, statistician
- Charles Birch (vice-master), biologist, Templeton Prize winner
- Alan Edward Bray, vascular surgeon, founding member of the International Society of Endovascular Surgery
- Allan G. Bromley, computer scientist/historian
- Hedley Bull FBA, Professor of International Relations
- Graeme James Caughley, ecologist
- Frederick Colin Courtice, Rhodes Scholar and Professor of Pathology
- Anna Donald, Rhodes Scholar and pioneer in the field of evidence-based medicine
- Donald William George AO, Vice-Chancellor of the University of Newcastle
- Seth Grant, neuroscientist
- Lester Hiatt, anthropologist
- Ove Hoegh-Guldberg, biologist and climate scientist
- John Irvine Hunter, anatomist
- Ray Ison, environmental scientist
- Keith Jones, surgeon and past president of the Australian Medical Association
- Clifford Kwan-Gett, pioneer of the artificial heart
- John Moulton OAM, former Wallabies team doctor
- Tim Murray, archaeologist
- Gordon Parker, scientia professor of psychiatry at the University of New South Wales
- Stewart Turner, geophysicist

=== Politics, public service, and the law ===
- Reginald Barrett, Judge of the Supreme Court of NSW
- Rawdon Dalrymple, Rhodes Scholar and Australian Ambassador to the United States, Japan, Indonesia, and Israel
- John Dauth, Australian High Commissioner to the United Kingdom, New Zealand, and Malaysia
- Karin Emerton, Judge of the Supreme Court of Victoria
- Ken Matthews, public servant
- Neville Perkins OAM, Northern Territory Politician and first Indigenous Australian to hold a shadow ministry in an Australian parliament
- Neil Pickard, NSW politician
- Walter Cresswell O'Reilly, public servant
- John Tierney, Senator for New South Wales
- Greg Urwin, Diplomat and Secretary General of the Pacific Islands Forum
- Julie Ward, Judge of the Supreme Court of NSW
- Taimus Werner-Gibbings, Member of ACT Legislative Assembly

=== Military ===
- Mervyn Brogan KBE, CB, Chief of Army
- Ronald McNicoll CBE, AM, Major General
- Robert Page DSO, member of Z Special Unit

=== Business ===
- Henry Bosch, businessman
- David Johnson, former president and CEO of Campbell Soup Company

=== Royalty ===
- Taufa'ahau Tupou IV, King of Tonga

=== Arts and humanities ===
- Anna Broinowski, filmmaker
- Ian Dunlop, filmmaker
- Melissa Beowulf, portrait artist
- Malcolm Brown, Sydney Morning Herald journalist and non-fiction writer
- Rob Carlton, actor
- Libby Gleeson, Children's author
- Milton Osborne, historian
- Dolph Lundgren, actor
- Frank Walker, Journalist and non-fiction writer

=== Sports ===
- Adrienne Cahalan, sailor
- Gillian Campbell, Olympic rower
- Emma Fessey, Australian Champion rower
- Peter FitzSimons, former Wallaby & Journalist
- John Langford, Brumbies and Wallabies player
- Nick Larkin, cricketer
- Al Kanaar, Wallabies & NSW Waratahs rugby player
- David Lyons, Wallabies & NSW Waratahs rugby player
- Georgina Morgan, Olympic hockey player
- Nick Phipps, Wallabies & NSW Waratahs rugby player
- Faye Sultan, Kuwaiti Olympic Swimmer (exchange student from Williams College)
- John Treloar, Olympic track and field athlete
- Bronwen Watson, Olympic rower
- Sam Gee, Olympic Breaststroker

=== Other ===
- Peter Hall, architect who completed the Sydney Opera House after the resignation of Jørn Utzon
- Winston O'Reilly, Methodist minister
- Anna Rose, activist and co-founded the Australian Youth Climate Coalition
- Gregory Stanton, founder of Genocide Watch
- Ian Stapleton, architect
- Dhananjayan Sriskandarajah, Rhodes Scholar and chief executive of Oxfam
- Keith Suter, futurist

=== Rhodes Scholars ===
- 1923 Ambrose John Foote
- 1933 Frederick Colin Courtice
- 1952 Rawdon Dalrymple
- 1955 Alan Edward Davis
- 1970 Greg Houghton
- 1989 Anna Donald
- 1995 Andrew Robertson
- 1996 Stuart Grieve
- 1998 Dhananjayan Sriskandarajah
- 2000 Annaleise Grummitt
- 2004 Nilay Hazari
