= Opus (University of Newcastle magazine) =

- Type: Student newspaper
- Format: Tabloid
- Owner(s): Newcastle University Students' Association
- Editor-in-chief: Tyler Bridges (NUSA Media Officer, 2019- present)
- Founded: 1954
- Political alignment: Left-wing
- Language: English
- Headquarters: Callaghan, NSW
- Price: Free
- Website: OPUS MAGAZINE

Opus is a student newspaper published at the University of Newcastle, Australia by the Newcastle University Students' Association (NUSA). Opus was founded in 1954 by then economics lecturer Cyril Renwick, at what was then the Newcastle University College of the University of New South Wales, in the Newcastle suburb of Callaghan. Renwick proposed a student journal to promote student unity and expression. Teaming up with his secretary's husband, George Kirkby, the first edition of Opus was a four-page broadsheet newspaper replete with the refinement and formality of 1950s journalism.

The format and style of Opus has changed many times throughout its history. The 1970s the publications name was briefly changed to The Stockton Ferry. In a 1998 interview, the late emeritus Professor Godfrey Tanner explained that

"[The Stockton Ferry was] the brainchild of James Beisers and his co-editor who were into drug reform. The idea being that readers would be encouraged to take short trips after reading its contents."

A special edition of the magazine, released in 2002, and edited by BA graduate Matthew Glenn Ward commemorated the life of Godfrey Tanner, a prominent classics professor at the university who had died that year.

Opus takes its name from the former Newcastle City motto, finis coronat opus which is Latin for "completion crowns the work".

The implementation of voluntary student unionism by the Howard government in 2006 had a significant impact on the viability of student media across Australia, compulsory student union membership fees having been the major source of income for most. Opus has been able to continue publishing despite the new law.

Opus was rebranded and relaunched in 2016 after a period of stagnation.

Opus is edited by the UNSA Media Officer and a team of volunteers.

In 2018, Opus became a newspaper again, published monthly.

In 2020, Opus was taken over by UNSA and returned to reoccurring magazine publication with online publication as well.
