= UNSA =

UNSA may refer to:

== Universities ==
- Universitas Surakarta, Surakarta, Indonesia
- Université de Nice Sophia Antipolis, Nice, France
- National University of St Augustin of Arequipa (Universidad Nacional de San Agustín de Arequipa), Arequipa, Peru
- University of Sarajevo, Bosnia and Herzegovina
- National University of Salta (Universidad Nacional de Salta, UNSa), Salta, Argentina
- University of Newcastle Students' Association, Australia

== Other ==
- Union nationale des syndicats autonomes, a French trade union
- UNSA Stadium, Arequipa, Peru
- United Nations Space Alliance, a faction in Call of Duty: Infinite Warfare
- Union nationale des syndicats agricoles, a defunct French farmers' union
