= JHH =

JHH may refer to:

- John Hunter Hospital, Newcastle, Australia
- Johns Hopkins Hospital, Baltimore, United States
