= Malcolm Brown (journalist) =

Australian journalist (born 1947)

Malcolm Craig Brown (born 29 May 1947) is an Australian journalist, editor and the co-author of books dealing with crime, forensic science, disasters and the Vietnam War.

== Early life ==
Brown was born in Dubbo, New South Wales, and was the second son of a solicitor, Samuel Brown, and the grandson of a Methodist Minister, The Reverend E E Hynes. He was educated at state schools in Dubbo before attending Newington College, Sydney, as a boarder in 1963 and 1964. Brown's father had taught at Newington (1932–39) before becoming a legal practitioner and his grandfather was Chaplain at Newington whilst serving in the Stanmore parish. In 1965, Brown entered the University of Sydney to study law and was a resident of Wesley College until 1968 when he went down from the University and became a cadet journalist on the Dubbo newspaper, The Daily Liberal.

== Military service ==
Brown was called up for National Service the following year and after Officer Training School graduated as a second lieutenant. He served as a platoon commander of the Third Training Battalion in Singleton, New South Wales.

== Writing career ==
Brown joined the staff of the Sydney Morning Herald in 1972 and retired on 30 August 2012 as a senior writer and editor. He covered the Azaria Chamberlain case for The Herald. ABC TV's Australian Story covered his career on 29 October 2012 in an episode titled "A Man of His Word".

== Publications ==
- You're leaving tomorrow: conscripts and correspondents caught up in the Vietnam War (Nth Syd, Random House 2007) ISBN 978-1-74166-581-9
- Cold Blooded Murder: true crimes that rocked Australia (Syd, Lothian 2006) ISBN 0-7344-0961-3
- Australia's Worst Disasters (Sth Melb, Lothian 2002) ISBN 0-7344-0338-0
- Bombs, Guns and Knives: violent crime in Australia (Syd, New Holland 2000) ISBN 1-86436-668-0
- Australian Crime: chilling tales of our time (Syd, Lansdowne 1993, 1995, 2001, 2004) ISBN 1-86302-312-7
- Rorting: the great Australian crime (Syd, Lansdowne 1999) ISBN 1-86302-605-3
- Justice and Nightmares: successes and failures of forensic science in Australia and New Zealand (Syd, University of New South Wales Press 1992) ISBN 0-86840-061-0
