= Frank Walker (writer, born 1919) =

Frank Bartley Walker (19 September 1919 – 24 August 2008) was an Australian journalist and non-fiction writer.

== Early life ==
Walker was born in Hay, New South Wales, the son of Frank and Ethel Walker. Walker attended Newington College (1934–1936) before entering the University of Sydney to study arts while a resident of Wesley College. He joined The Sydney Morning Herald as a journalist in 1938.

== War service ==
In 1939, Walker enlisted in the Royal Australian Navy, and served as a lieutenant in corvette hunting submarines. During the war he married Joyce, an army nurse who had served in Palestine.

== Journalism ==
Following World War II, Walker returned to the Herald and was posted to the United States of where he worked with Reuters-Australian Associated Press. His reporting of McCarthyism brought him into conflict with Joe McCarthy and his wife's visa was cancelled. He then worked for Reuters in London before joining The Herald (Melbourne).

== Government service ==
In 1956, he joined the Australian Information Service and worked from London on immigration publicity. He revolutionised Australian immigration advertisements in Europe by showing something symbolic of Australia without spruiking immigration as such ads were banned in Scandinavia. He became Australian press attache in Germany in 1960.

== Retirement ==
Walker retired to Budgewoi, New South Wales in 1980 and wrote a number of military histories. In 1999 his wife died and he died in 2008 survived by his second wife, Erika, and two sons, Peter and Frank Walker.

== Honours ==
Recipient, Centenary Medal 2001

== Publications ==
- HMAS Armidale Lives On (Kingfisher Press, 2005)
- The Dark Betrayal (Kingfisher Press, 1997)
- Corvettes : little ships for big men (Kingfisher Press, 1995) ISBN 0-646-25918-0
- The Mystery of X-5 (London, 1988) ISBN 0-7183-0628-7
- HMAS Armidale : the ship that had to die (Kingfisher Press, 1990)
- Hearts of Oak (Patersons Printing, 1945)
- Tales of the sea (Sydney, 1943]
