= Vincent Candrawinata =

Australian nutritionist

- Born: 22 July 1989 (age 36)

Vincent Candrawinata (born 22 July 1989) is an Australian clinical nutritionist, researcher and food scientist.

== Career ==
Candrawinata undertook a research project with The University of Newcastle from 2011 to 2014 to determine the possibility of extracting and activating Phenolics contained within fruit produce. Through a process involving only water, he invented the scientific method of doing that which resulted in the creation of Activated Phenolics. The produce used involved apples.

In October 2016, he was awarded the Young Alumni Award by The University of Newcastle.

=== Renovatio Bioscience ===
In 2015, he patented the process and founded Renovatio Bioscience to commercialize the scientific invention and created products under the brand Activated Phenolics. The firm is based in Sydney. In 2017, the firm launched a skin cream containing activated phenolics called APSKIN. In 2020 the company launched additional products which are stocked in Woolworths.
