= University of Newcastle Students' Association =

- Abbreviation: UNSA
- Established: 28 April 1954; 72 years ago as Newcastle University College Students' Association
- Registered as company: 27 May 2020 as University of Newcastle Students' Association Ltd.
- Address: UNSA Building, University Drive, Callaghan 2308
- Governing body: Board of Directors
- Membership: Students of the University of Newcastle
- Website: www.unsa.org.au

The University of Newcastle Students' Association (UNSA) is the student organisation at the University of Newcastle, NSW, Australia (UON). The organisation provides a range of student services and supports campus life activities and events. UNSA facilitates the UON's elected Student Representative Council (SRC) which is the peak representative body for all students at the university.

== History ==
=== Establishment ===
The origins of UNSA began at Newcastle University College (NUC, established 1951). NUC was created as an offshoot of the New South Wales University of Technology (now known as the University of New South Wales) and was co-located with the Newcastle Technical College at Tighes Hill. As NUC began to expand its enrollment in 1952 and 1953, views among the student body continued to grow that the university's student union, based in Sydney, unable to adequately represent students in Newcastle. This push by NUC students for a local student union resulted in the creation of Newcastle University College Students' Association (NUCSA). The inaugural governing Council of NUCSA held their first meetings in 1953 and the organisation became incorporated as a fully constituted body on 28 April 1954 with the adoption of its constitution. From then it was eligible to receive compulsory student union fees collected from all students at NUC.

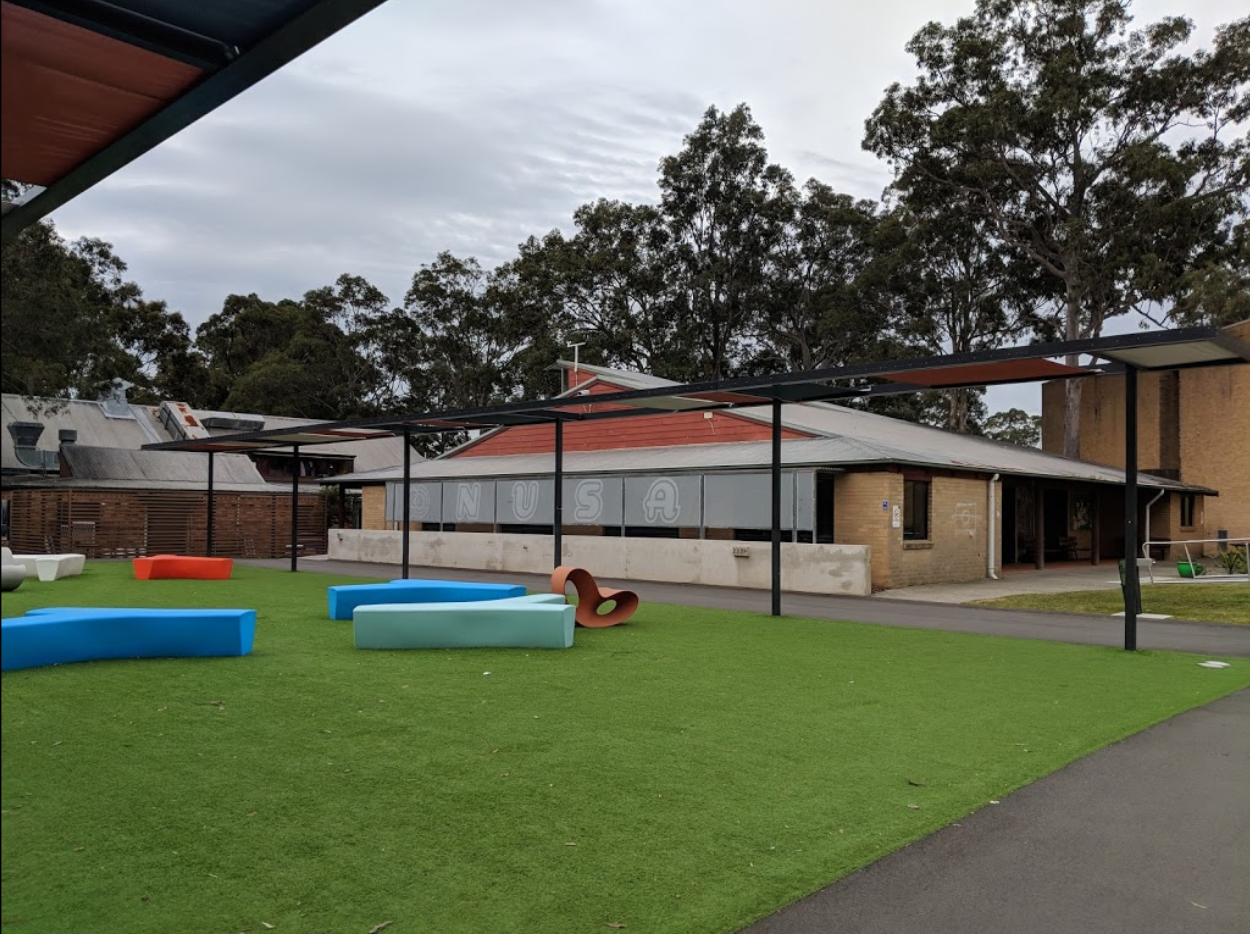
The NUSA Building on the eastern side of Callaghan campus at University of Newcastle, Australia

=== Renaming as NUSA ===
Throughout the 1950s and 1960s, Newcastle residents and NUCSA campaigned for NUC to be re-constituted as a university in its own right. The campaign was ultimately successful, with the University of Newcastle being established as an autonomous institution on 1 January 1965 by gubernatorial proclamation under the University of Newcastle Act 1964 (NSW). Following the autonomy of UON, NUCSA was renamed as Newcastle University Student Representative Council (SRC), representing both undergraduate and post graduate students.

In 1966, the university and SRC relocated from Tighes Hill to a largely undeveloped bushland site in Shortland which underwent major development as enrollment grew in subsequent years.

In the 1970s the SRC morphed into the Newcastle University Student Association (NUSA). Subsequently an allied, but independenf, University of Newcastle Postgraduate Student Association (NUPSA) formed to better serve the interests of postgraduate students.

=== Political history ===
In the late 1960s the SRC was actively involved in campaigning for Aboriginal rights as a lead up to the 1967 National Referendum and in expressing opposition to the war in Vietnam; strongly opposing any Military presence on campus. Consistent with the historical dominance of Labor Left in the greater Newcastle area, a majority on the NUSA Council has long been held by the left factions of the National Union of Students of Australia usually by either the National Labor Students (NLS) or left-wing independent groups or more often by the two, cooperatively. Predecessors of these groups include the National Organisation of Labor Students (NOLS) and National Broad Left (NBL) which dissolved in the period of late 2005 and early 2006.

=== Voluntary Student Unionism ===
Despite the Howard government's Voluntary Student Unionism legislation, which was in place from 2006 to 2011 and prohibited the charging of student union fees, causing massive cuts to both staffing and service levels at NUSA, it continued to provide independent representation through its own sources of income and university funding. NUSA's partner student organisation at UON responsible for commercial services and entertainment events, the University of Newcastle Union Ltd, was wound up following a loss of revenue. This resulted in the university taking responsibility for most commercial leases and a range of campus life activities on the Newcastle campuses in the late 2000s and early 2010s.

=== Independence of NUPSA ===
Newcastle University Postgraduate Students' Association (NUPSA) was a name given to the Postgraduate Students Collective of the NUSA Council in the early 1990s. The elected Postgraduate Students Convenor on the NUSA Council was referred to as the president of the postgraduate students' association. During a time of a growing postgraduate student population at the university, from 1995 moves were initiated by the university to split NUPSA from NUSA as an independent organisation, citing the increasing diversity of postgraduate students' needs.

A motion at a Special General Meeting on 29 May 1997 for constitutional changes to establish NUPSA as an independent entity was defeated, resulting in the Postgraduate Students Collective remaining part of NUSA's structure. However, at a meeting of the University Council on 27 June 1997, the university resolved to override the decision and establish NUPSA as a separate entity from NUSA, effective from 1 July 1997. At the time, the move by the university was met with mixed views among the student body and concern from NUSA. While NUPSA began the process of operating separately to NUSA from the late 1990s to provide independent representation and support services for postgraduate students, the two bodies maintained a close collaborative relationship. NUPSA was registered as an incorporated association in NSW on 3 February 2014.

=== Founding of Central Coast Campus Union Ltd. (Yourimbah) ===
Interest in forming a local student union for the Central Coast began from 1989 at the time the university's Ourimbah Campus was beginning to develop and expand. A local Central Coast student body was soon formed and their aim was to become a financially independent recognised student body by the university. Following lobbying by the group, by 1993 the University Council voted to recognise the student body and provide funding from the General Service Fees of Central Coast students. From this, the Central Coast Campus Union (CCCU) was to be based on a guild structure providing both student representation and operating commercial services in contrast the split structure of multiple student organisations on the Newcastle campus.

In 2002, the organisation was registered as an Australian Company Limited by Guarantee under the name Central Coast Campus Union Ltd. (CCCUL). By the end of 2003, its Board had voted to change the trading name to Campus Central - Ourimbah.

Campus Central - Ourimbah did not receive any funding from the university in 2013 during a brief dispute with the company over the ownership and delivery of commercial services on the campus, but the relationship improved in following years. In early 2015, the company again re-branded itself under the name Yourimbah. The company maintained a strong relationship with NUSA and NUPSA to support university-wide student representation and the delivery activities and events.

=== Merger ===
In 2016 the NUSA Council adopted a four year strategic plan to expand services and reform its governance and representative structure. As part of this, NUSA initiated discussions with NUPSA and Yourimbah on combining the three existing student organisations into a single, whole of institution student union for UON. These discussions culminated in the signing of a memorandum of understanding in 2019 between NUSA, NUPSA and Yourimbah for the merger of the three separate organisations to form the University of Newcastle Students' Association (UNSA).

University of Newcastle Students' Association Ltd. was registered as an Australian Public Company, Limited By Guarantee on 27 May 2020. From 30 June 2020, NUSA ceased most operations as an incorporated association alongside NUPSA and Yourimbah pending wind up and deregistration as individual legal entities. On 1 July 2020, UNSA commenced operating in place of the three separate student associations and began providing the services previously delivered by NUSA, NUPSA and Yourimbah.

== Structure and Governance ==
UNSA is a not-for-profit Australian Public Company Limited by Guarantee with a governing board consisting of nine directors. The board's composition includes six elected students and three appointed directors.

== Services ==
UNSA enhances the lives of students at the University of Newcastle by providing:

- Student representation and advocacy
- Welfare and support services
- Campus activities and events
- Clubs and societies
- Student media, including Opus magazine
- Equipment hire
- Subsidized and free food on campus
- Discounted training courses
- Sporting and gym facilities

On 4 February 2026, the organisation commenced operating from a new UNSA HQ space in Shortland Union building, marking the return of the SRC office to the original Union Building.

== Student Representative Council (SRC) ==
UNSA's representative structure facilitates the Student Representative Council (SRC) as the peak representative body for students at the University of Newcastle. Prior to the reforms to student representation commencing from 2016-2020 and the transition to UNSA Ltd, the NUSA Council had a dual role of both the governing body of the organisation and the principle SRC for UON. Representatives on the SRC are elected by the student body in annual elections in Semester 2 each year.

=== Representative structure ===
The SRC's structure incorporates several representative committees and bodies, each chaired by an office holder elected to the SRC. These include portfolio committees for Education, Wellbeing & Welfare, Engagement & Experience; a Postgraduate Student Senate; an International Student Senate; Campus Committees; and Collectives for Disability, Indigenous, Queer and Women's representative groups.

Elected positions on the SRC include:

- President (Chair);
- Vice-President Education;
- Vice-President Engagement & Experience;
- Vice-President Welfare & Wellbeing;
- International Students’ Senate Convenor;
- Postgraduate Students’ Senate Convenor;
- Disability Collective Convenor;
- Indigenous Students’ Collective Convenor;
- Queer Collective Convenor;
- Women’s Collective Convenor;
- Newcastle Campuses Committee Convenor;
- Central Coast Campuses Committee Convenor;
- Cloud Campus Committee Convenor;
- Sydney Campus Committee Convenor; and
- Port Macquarie Campus Committee Convenor.

That are also several positions that are elected externally to the SRC and hold ex-officio membership on the Council:

- Student Member on University Council;
- Student Representative of Academic Senate; and
- Student Accommodation Representative.

The SRC Executive consists of the President, the three Vice Presidents and the two Senate Convenors.

UNSA presidents by year
Name	Year	SRC	Political association/grouping
Imogen Reid	2026	74th	-
Matthew Jeffrey/Imogen Reid	2025	73rd	UON Labor/unaligned
Jennifer Lowe	2024	72nd	UON Labor
Georgie Cooper	2023	71st	-
Jessica Philbrook	2022	70th	-
Luka Harrison	2021	69th	National Labor Students (NLS)
Luka Harrison	2020	68th	National Labor Students (NLS)

The first SRC of the University refers to the Council of NUCSA commencing in the year of 1953 with subsequent Councils named in numerical succession each year from this, the 2nd SRC of UON being in the year of 1954 and 3rd SRC for 1955 and so on.

==== Past Presidents ====
Presidents by Year
UNSA Presidents
Name	Year	SRC	Political association/grouping
Imogen Reid	2026	74th	-
Matthew Jeffrey/Imogen Reid	2025	73rd	UON Labor/ unaligned
Jennifer Lowe	2024	72nd	UON Labor
Georgie Cooper	2023	71st	-
Jessica Philbrook	2022	70th	-
Luka Harrison	2021	69th	National Labor Students (NLS)
Luka Harrison	2020	68th	National Labor Students (NLS)
NUSA Presidents
Name	Year	SRC	Political association/grouping
Kearnie Kelly	2020	68th	Grassroots Independents
Kearnie Kelly	2019	67th	Grassroots Independents
Christy Mullen	2018	66th	Grassroots Independents
Michael Labone	2017	65th	National Labor Students (NLS)/ Independent
Paige Johnson	2016	64th	National Labor Students (NLS)
Clare Swan/Paige Johnson	2015	63rd	National Labor Students (NLS)
Thomas Seilding/Clare Swan	2014	62nd	-
Rosemary Gosper	2013	61st	National Independents
Heather Richards	2012	60th	-
Heather Richards	2011	59th	-
Matilda Hunt	2010	58th	-
Talia Barrett	2009	57th	-
Beth Maloney	2008	56th	Grassroots Left
Megan Clement	2007	54th	Grassroots Left
Jack Thieme	2006	53rd	
Carl Harris	2005	52nd	
Michael Whitbread	2004	51st	Grassroots Left
Vanessa Bowden	2003	50th	
Kylie Rooke	2002	49th	National Organisation of Labor Students (NOLS)
Matthew Thompson	2001	48th	
Amie Grierson	2000	47th	
Michael Kachel	1999	46th	
Matthew Paul	1998	45th	
Lisa Ronneberg/Nicole Pietsch	1997	44th	
Gennice Davies	1996	43rd	
Lincon Saunders	1995	42nd	
Tina Bubutievski	1994	41st	
Tina Bubutievski	1993	40th	
Matthew Cantrill	1992	39th	
Christopher Toll	1991	38th	
Martin Davies	1990	37th	
Alison Kinder	1989	36th	
Glenn Beatty	1988	35th	
Chris Craig	1987	34th	
Chris Craig	1986	33rd	
Matthew Yates	1985	32nd	
Michael Harkin	1984	31st	
Terry Slevin	1983	30th	
Margaret Kavanagh	1982	29th	
Margaret Kavanagh	1981	28th	
Greg Holding	1980	27th	Council of Australian Labor Party Students (CALPS)
Max Spaanenburg	1979	26th	
Mick Barr	1978	25th	
Leo Walsh	1977	24th	
Paul Drinkwater	1976	23rd	
Adrian Woo	1975	22nd	
Dave Wallace	1974	21st	
Greg Giles	1973	20th	
Ann Duke	1972	19th	
Aldis Svirskis	1971	18th	
Russell Schulz	1970	17th	
Brailey Sims/Giles Martin	1969	16th	
Giles Martin	1968	15th	
John Sara	1967	14th	
Michael Nelson	1966	13th	
Kent Wilson/Tony Cootes	1965	12th	
NUCSA Presidents
Name	Year	SRC	Political association/grouping
Tony Cootes /Kent Wilson	1964	11th	
Tony Cootes	1963	10th	
Paul Walmsley	1962	9th	
John Cornelius/Paul Walmsley	1961	8th	
Adrian Nelmes/John Cornelius	1960	7th	
Christopher Cornelius	1959	6th	
Joan Sawyers	1958	5th	
Peter Allen	1957	4th	
George Kirkby	1956	3rd	
Robert Hitchcock	1955	2nd	
Jim Dowrie	1954	1st	

== Campaigns ==
The union and its collectives are involved in a number of campaigns at any one time. The organisation maintains a strong relationship with the other unions on campus such as the CPSU, NTEU and United Voice by joining with them in many campaigns.

=== Construction of Warabrook railway station ===
Amid growing transportation concerns from students as the Callaghan campus expanded, NUSA initiated a protracted student-led campaign during the late 1970s for a new railway station to be constructed on the Main Northern railway line to service the campus. The organisation held several extended public campaigns and lobbied state and federal members of parliament for support. NUSA was ultimately successful in this campaign by the early 1990s and on 23 October 1995, Warabrook railway station was opened.

=== Preventing the closure of the Huxley Library ===
In the late 1990s and early 2000s the Vice-Chancellor announced several plans to close the Huxley Library. NUSA and the student body led strong campaigns against this, in one instance organizing and holding three successive rallies of several hundred students each in the same week. The large-scale student protests organised by NUSA caused the university to abandon plans to close the Library.

=== Night-time safety on campus ===
Night-time safety at the Callaghan campus was an issue that rose prominence from the early 2010s, following reports of attacks on students. Campaigns run by NUSA to draw attention to this issue have led to improvements to campus lighting and security services.

=== Outsourcing of UON facilities maintenance services ===
Between 2015 and 2017, NUSA mounted a sustained campaign in opposition to university's decision to outsource of facilities maintenance services to Broadspectrum (previously known as Transfield Services), a company that was controversially responsible for running Australia's immigration detention centers in Nauru and Manus Island. In May 2017, the university announced that it was cutting ties with the company.

=== Compulsory class attendance ===
From Semester 1 2020, the university's vice-chancellor introduced a compulsory 80% attendance requirement at small group tutorials, laboratory sessions and seminars for all first-year students. The consequence of failing to meet the 80% attendance requirements for a course was Component Fail grade. In order to prove their attendance in classes students were required to use an app with geotracking software. NUSA's Education Collective initiated a campaign against the mandatory attendance policy and raised concerns over the geotracking software used to monitor students. In March 2020, during growing concerns of the global COVID-19 pandemic, the university announced the suspension of the mandatory attendance policy.

=== Other campaigns ===
Other notable campaigns by NUSA include:

- Being one of the leading groups in the campaign for the autonomy and formal establishment of the University of Newcastle in the early 1950s.
- Campaigning in opposition to attempts by NSW Liberal Governments to close the Newcastle railway line and the City's CBD train stations both in the early 1990s and mid 2010s.
- Campaigning against the Abbott-Turnbull-Morrison Governments' plans to deregulate university and reduce the HECS repayment threshold.
- The introduction of a cap of 50% course weighting for all exams and the move to a restricted open-book format as the default option for final exams from 2016
- Lobbying the university to purchase up to 25% green power in the early 2000s as well as moving to become the first university in Australia to be powered by 100% renewable energy, and achieve carbon neutrality in the late 2010s.
