= Margaret Henry =

Australian community activist and politician

Margaret Henry (25 July 1934 – 9 September 2015) was an Australian community activist and local government politician.

== Early life ==
Born Helen Margaret on 25 July 1934, she was the youngest of three children, having two older sisters. Her parents were Miriam Dora Groth and William Gardner. She was born and grew up in New Lambton, a suburb of Newcastle, New South Wales, Australia.

== Education ==
Henry went to Newcastle Girls High (now Newcastle High). She was awarded Dux at Newcastle Girls High in 1951 and received Bachelor of Arts (BA) from the University of Sydney. In 1955 she received a diploma of education for the University of New England.

== University of Newcastle ==
She was a history lecturer at the University of Newcastle and lectured in Australian history between 1968 and 1985. Henry spent most of her teaching career with the Open Foundation program for mature aged students at the University of Newcastle. In 1983 she helped establish the Wollotuka Institute. Between 1981 and 1983 Henry was appointed to the Council of the Newcastle College of Advanced Educated by the Education Minister and served as one of two staff representatives on the University of Newcastle Council between 1984 and 1986. In 1990 she taught at the University of Newcastle Department of Community Programs. Henry was a preserver of history, leaving a legacy in history course she developed for the Open Foundation program and local oral histories that were digitised in 2015 by the University of Newcastle Library.

== Community advocacy ==
In 1980 Henry joined the National Trust of Australia (NSW) and the Hunter Regional Committee of the National Trust and was awarded a National Trust honorary life membership. After the 1989 Newcastle Earthquake she established the Citizen's Earthquake Action Group which was set up to save culturally significant buildings that were damaged in the earthquake including Royal Newcastle Hospital North Wing and Wheeler House. In 1989 she become the president of Newcastle Hill Residents Group. In the wake of the earthquake she published a book The Battle for Newcastle : heritage and the earthquake. In 1992 Henry was a founding member of Save Our Rail Inc.

In 2003 and 2009 Henry received a NSW Government Heritage Volunteers Award. In 2010 she was made "Hunter Patron of Heritage" by the Hunter Heritage Network and received the Edna Ryan Award from the Australian Services Union.

Henry remained strong in her advocacy role during early 2015, when she was a Convenor of a public meeting to discuss the Newcastle & Hunter Planning Enquiry.

After her death she was fondly acknowledged by many in the wider community, including tributes from David Shoebridge and Leah Rhiannon and others.

In 2018 the annual Margaret Henry Memorial Lecture was established, with the first lecture given by Marcus Westbury. In 2019 Wendy McCarthy AO, a prominent businesswoman, feminist activist and educator delivered the lecture.

== Political career ==
In 1968 she joined the Labor Party until 1988. She became a foundation member of the Hunter Green Network which in 1991 became the Newcastle Greens. She joined the Greens party on Newcastle City Council in 1995 and served two terms as Deputy Mayor from 1996 to 2000. Leader of the Green NSW David Shoebridge, MLC described Henry as "an indefatigable community activist" and a NSW Upper House tribute resolution moved to note "with thanks and admiration the unflagging work she performed on behalf of the Newcastle community".

== Awards ==
In 2009 Henry received the Honorary Life Member from the National Trust of Australia (NSW). In 2010 she received the Hunter Patron of Heritage by the Hunter Heritage Network Inc. In 2015 she was awarded the Edna Ryan Award for leadership. and in 2016 received posthumously the Freeman of the City of Newcastle on Australia Day.

== Personal life ==
In 1958 she married Brian Henry. She lived in the United Kingdom for one year teaching secondary students in Manchester area before returning to Newcastle in 1962. She had three children: David born in 1964, Alison born in 1962 and Catherine born in 1960. In 1984 she divorced her husband Brian. On 9 September 2015 she died of pancreatic cancer.
