= Donald William George =

Donald William George AO (1926–2014) was the Vice-Chancellor of the University of Newcastle from 1975 to 1986.

== Career ==
George was a graduate in Science and Engineering at the University of Sydney, where he was also awarded his doctoral degree for research in the field of plasma physics. George resided at Wesley College while studying at the University of Sydney.

George was awarded an Officer of the Order of Australia in 1979 for services to the sciences and engineering, and a Centenary Medal in 2001 for services to Australian society in atomic energy.
