= David Johnson (company director) =

Australian-American business executive

David Willis Johnson (7 August 1932 – June 19, 2016) was an Australian-American company director, who as president and CEO led the Campbell's from 1990 until 1997 and then again from March 2000 to January 2001. He was also the CEO of Gerber, the president of Entenmanns, and on the board of directors for Colgate Palmolive. In 1997, Johnson was named the Director of the Year in the United States of America.

== Early life and education ==
Johnson was born in New South Wales and grew up near Tumut in the Snowy Mountains. From the family farm he rode to the one room Lacmalac Public School for his primary education. He attended Newington College (1947–1950) and was Senior Boarder Prefect and captained the 1st XV rugby and 1st XI cricket. He continued his sporting career at Wesley College, University of Sydney, where he captained the rugby, athletics and cricket teams, was Senior Student, and won a university rowing Blue. He graduated in Economics at the University of Sydney in 1954 and received a Diploma of Education the following year. In 1958 he received an MBA from the University of Chicago.

== Business career ==
He began his business career as an executive trainee for the Ford Motor Company in Geelong, Victoria, where he won a Rotary Foundation Fellowship to study at the University of Chicago. In 1959, he became a management trainee at Colgate-Palmolive International in Australia, and, in 1967, became chairman and managing director of its South African operation. In 1973, he went to Hong Kong as President of Warner-Lambert/Park Davis Asia, and, in 1976, he moved to the United States as President of two successive divisions within that company. In 1979, he became head of Entenmann's Inc., and continued as president and CEO when it was acquired by General Foods in 1982. During his leadership of this company, sales and profits quadrupled, and when, in 1987, he was named chairman, President and CEO of Gerber Products, earnings grew at an annual rate of more than 50 per cent. In 1990, Johnson joined Campbell's as president and CEO and retired from the company in 1997. Under his leadership, the company's value increased by an average of 23 per cent a year. In 1997, Johnson was named the Director of the Year in the United States of America.

== Death ==
Johnson died June 19, 2016, in Doylestown, Pennsylvania. He was 83.
