= John Irvine Hunter =

Australian anatomist (1898–1924)

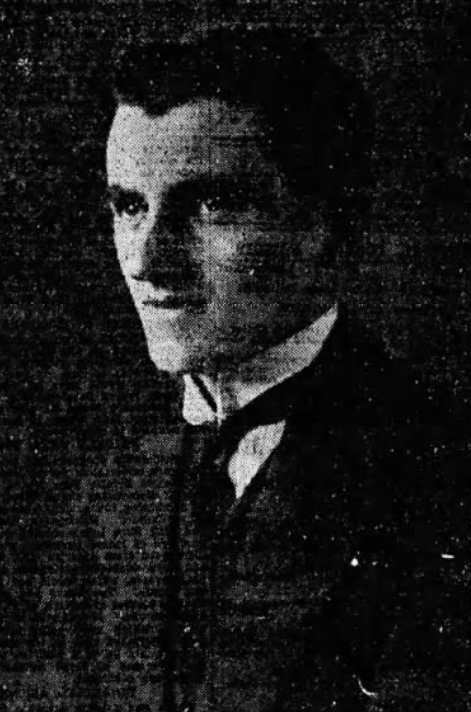
- Born: 24 January 1898; Bendigo, Australia
- Died: 10 December 1924 (aged 26); London, England
- Education: Fort Street High School; University of Sydney
- Occupation: Professor
- Employers: Wesley College; University of Cambridge
- Spouse: Hazel Annie McPherson (m. 1924)

John Irvine Hunter (24 January 1898 – 10 December 1924) was an Australian professor of anatomy.

== Early life and education ==
Hunter was born in Bendigo, Victoria, the third son of Henry Hunter, a furniture dealer, and Isabella née Hodgson.

Hunter received his primary education at Albury Public school (1906–12), and later at the academically selective Fort Street High School. Thereafter, he read medicine at the University of Sydney, despite his poor background.

Hunter graduated with first-class honours in 1920. From 1917 to 1920, Hunter was a medical tutor at Wesley College, University of Sydney, and, from 1918 to 1920, he was a demonstrator in anatomy.

== Career and later life ==
During World War I, Hunter enlisted for active service in 1917.

== Death ==
In 1924, Hunter travelled to England to give three lectures. He finished his first lecture on 5 December but he became ill shortly afterwards.

While travelling to England, Hunter had contracted typhoid fever and died from the illness at University College Hospital on 10 December 1924.

== Personal life ==
Hunter married Hazel Annie McPherson in February 1924. A posthumous son, Irvine John Hunter, was born on 6 September 1925.

== Legacy ==
Portraits by John Longstaff and William Beckwith McInnes were painted after his death; both hang in the Anderson Stuart building of the University of Sydney. Bronze medallions, sculpted by Rayner Hoff, are held at Wesley College, the university and Fort Street High School.
