= John Hunter Hospital =

John Hunter Hospital and John Hunter Children's Hospital
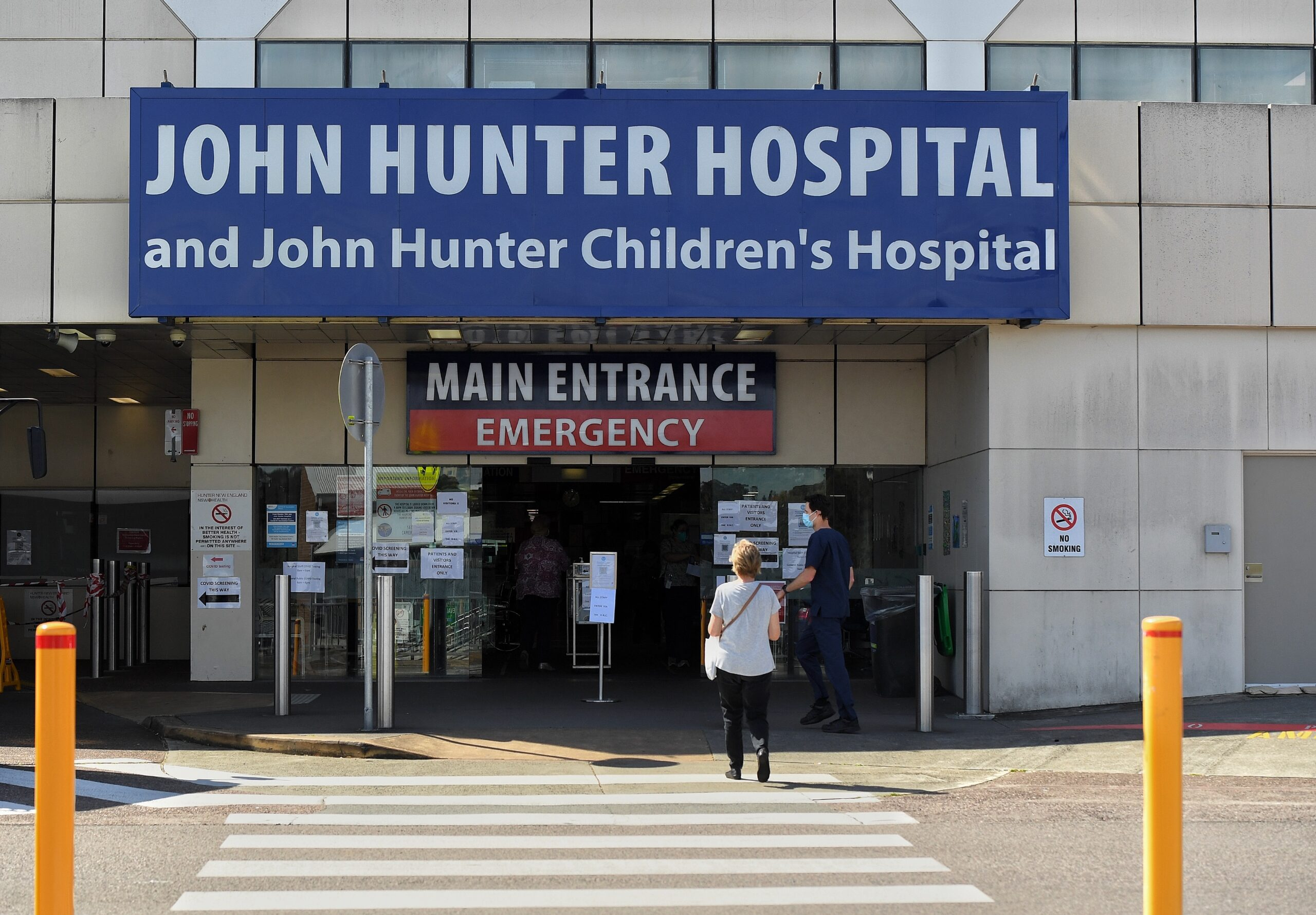
- Main entrance, 2021

- Location within New South Wales

Geography
- Location: New Lambton Heights, New South Wales, Australia
- Coordinates: 32.9225°S 151.6930°E

Organisation
- Care system: Public Medicare (AU)
- Type: Teaching
- Affiliated university: University of Newcastle
- Network: Hunter New England Local Health District

Services
- Emergency department: Yes, major trauma centre
- Beds: 820 inclusive of JHCH and Royal Newcastle Centre

Helipads
- Helipad: (ICAO: YXJH)
Number	Length		Surface
Number	ft	m	Surface
1			concrete

History
- Founded: 25 May 1991; Nick Greiner; Premier of New South Wales

Links
- Website: www.nsw.gov.au/departments-and-agencies/hnelhd
- Lists: Hospitals in Australia

The John Hunter Hospital and John Hunter Children's Hospital (sometimes known as the JHH and JHCH respectively), is a teaching hospital and children's hospital in Newcastle, and northern New South Wales, Australia. The 820 bed hospital is the main teaching hospital of the University of Newcastle. The hospital contains the only trauma centre in New South Wales outside the Sydney Metropolitan Area, and has the busiest emergency department in the state. John Hunter is the busiest trauma hospital in the country.

== Overview ==
The John Hunter health complex consists of 820 beds in total, and is co-located next to the 174 bed Newcastle Private Hospital, as well as the regional Hunter Area Pathology Service which provides tertiary level pathology testing. The complex consists of a single building, which is divided into 694 adult beds and another 126 paediatric beds in the John Hunter Children's Hospital.

The hospital was constructed to replace the Royal Newcastle Hospital which was extensively damaged during the 1989 Newcastle earthquake. Its completion was considered critical by the then-government and was constructed mainly by local construction firm D.F. McCloy both ahead of time and under budget. The building was officially opened by the Premier of New South Wales, Liberal Nick Greiner, on 25 May 1991.

The Royal Newcastle Centre, opened as an extension wing to the John Hunter Hospital in April 2006, providing 144 of these beds. Patients from the Hunter Region and beyond are referred to John Hunter for treatment in a range of specialities. The John Hunter Children's Hospital and Royal Newcastle Centre are located within the same building as the John Hunter Hospital. Also on the same hospital campus is the Rankin Park Hospital for rehabilitation, Newcastle Private Hospital and the Hunter Medical Research Institute.

In 2018, Liberal Minister of Health, Brad Hazzard, and Minister for the Hunter, Taylor Martin, announced construction of the 'John Hunter Health and Innovation Precinct' project which rebuilds a new emergency, birthing, neonatal, and operating theatres as well as a new helipad at the hospital. Construction firm Multiplex won the tender to complete the build.

== Specialty services provided ==
The JHH and JHCH are tertiary level hospitals, and provide the following specialties and subspecialties:

Specialty	Details
Anaesthesia	Including sub-specialties in cardiac, neuro, obstetric, paediatric & regional anaesthesia as well as pain medicine (both acute and chronic pain services are available)
Intensive care	The 37 bed intensive care complex provides both adult and paediatric ICU. The 29 bed adult ICU provides of general medical, general surgical, cardiac, trauma & neurosurgical intensive care. The ICU is able to provide advanced respiratory support for severe respiratory failure including invasive ventilation, non-invasive ventilation, high frequency oscillation ventilation, proning, and VV-ECMO. Haemodynamic support available includes vasopressor and inotropic support, advanced haemodynamic monitoring, echocardiography, continuous renal replacement therapy, intra-aortic balloon pump, VA-ECMO and Impella/percutaneous LVAD. Neurocritical care includes EVD pressure monitoring, continuous EEG monitoring, transcranial Doppler.
Paediatric intensive care	The newly built 8 bed PICU was opened in 2017 and is one of 3 tertiary PICUs in the state. Currently funded for 4 beds, and provides non-invasive and invasive ventilator support as well as haemodynamic support.
Neonatal intensive care	18 NICU and 24 special care beds, providing care for children born as early as 23 weeks gestation.
Retrieval medicine	The Hunter New England Aeromedical Retrieval Service provides both primary (pre-hospital) and secondary (inter-hospital) adult and paediatric retrieval services. Doctors from anaesthesia, intensive care and emergency provide the medical staff, whilst ICU nurses provide nursing support for secondary retrievals. The secondary retrieval service is led by the on-call intensive care specialist.
Emergency medicine	Providing tertiary adult and paediatric emergency care
Trauma	The JHH and JHCH is the busiest trauma centre in the state and the second busiest nationally. It has a dedicated trauma surgical team as well as utilising the expertise of sub-specialty surgeons when required.
Surgical specialties	General surgery Upper GI – hepatic, pancreatic and oesophageal surgery Colorectal surgery – Including laparoscopic and minimally invasive oncology surgery Endocrine surgery Orthopaedics (elective and trauma); Oral and maxillofacial surgery (OMFS); Ear nose and throat (ENT); Head and neck – a combined team of OMFS and ENT surgeons Cardiothoracic surgery – Elective and emergency cardiac, aortic and thoracic surgery. Renal transplant Urology surgery Vascular surgery – Open and percutaneous interventional techniques Ophthalmology; Plastic and reconstructive surgery
Medical specialties	General medicine Neurology – General neurology, stroke, interventional neuroradiology (DSA and anaerysm treatment, clot retrieval), EEG, neuropsychology, multiple sclerosis clinics. Cardiology – Interventional, electrophysiology and echocardiography. JHH Interventional Cardiologists have experience in percutaneous techniques such as TAVI and balloon aortic valvulopasty Respiratory medicine – Including sub-specialties of general respiratory, cystic fibrosis & sleep medicine. Toxicology; Endocrinology, Gastroenterology, Nephrology and dialysis Rheumatology; Immunology; Dermatology
Obstetrics and gynaecology	Including gynae-oncology and high risk maternal-fetal medicine unit
Radiology	Xrays, CT, MRI, nuclear medicine and interventional radiology including embolization.
Psychiatry	Both adult and paediatric psychiatry services are provided, both in-hospital and community.

== Wards ==
The John Hunter Hospital and John Hunter Children's Hospital consists of the following ~30 bed wards. Wards are designated by their horizontal position along the hospitals long corridor (by letter) and the number indicates which level of the hospital the ward is on (Levels 1–3). Hence ward E3 is positioned above E2 and next door to ward F3.

- Ward E1: General Medicine
- Ward E2: Urology/Rheumatology
- Ward E3: Orthopaedics
- Ward F1: Orthopaedics
- Ward F2: Immunology/Respiratory/General Medicine
- Ward F3: Cardiovascular
- Ward G1: Trauma/Special Surgery
- Ward G2: Neurology/Neurosurgery
- Ward G3: Cardiology/Gastroenterology
- Ward H1: Children's Medical
- Ward H3: Emergency Short Stay (ESSU) + Medical Acute Care Unit (MACU)
- Ward J1: Children's Surgical and Oncology
- Ward J2: Adolescent, Day Stay and Sleep Unit
- Ward J3: General Surgery
- Ward K1: Nephrology/Dialysis
- Ward K2: Maternity/Post-Natal
- Ward K3: Gynaecology/Gynaecology Oncology
- AGSU: Acute General Surgical Unit
- CCU: Coronary Care Unit
- ED: Emergency Department
- Transplant: Transplant
- ICU/HD: Intensive Care Unit/High Dependency Unit
- PICU: Paediatric Intensive Care Unit
- NICU: Neonatal Intensive Care Unit
- NEXUS: Adolescent Mental Health

== Origin of name ==
While a full page advertisement taken out by the John Hunter Hospital in the Newcastle Herald on 30 January 1991 references three notable John Hunters, the advertisement only explicitly references that the hospital was named after the former Governor, and although the advertisement states "Here's to the Governor who forged a nation, here's to the John Hunters who achieved so much in medical science, and here's to our John Hunter Hospital", the advertisement only explicitly references the former Governor of New South Wales as the namesake of the hospital, stating "...[S]everal dedicated and visionary people made enormous contributions toward building a nation that would one day stand as an example to the rest of the world. One such man was Governor John Hunter. Our Valley is named in his honour. So, too, is the State's newest and most modern hospital, the John Hunter Hospital at New Lambton Heights."

The three John Hunters referenced in the advertisement are:

- John Hunter, a former governor of New South Wales and the namesake of the whole Hunter region
- John Hunter, the famed 18th-century surgeon and pioneer of anatomical pathology, and
- John Irvine Hunter, an Australian anatomist who died in 1924 at the age of 26, having already been appointed the youngest anatomy professor at the University of Sydney

== Solar array ==
In late 2021, a solar installation said to be the largest on any hospital in the world, was switched on at the John Hunter Hospital. It contains more than 5,000 solar panels, covers 12,000 square metres, and generates 3.24 gigawatt-hours per year.

== Controversies ==
=== "Clinical Marshmallow" Incident ===
In January 2025, a hospital administrator accidentally sent an email to all junior doctors employed at the hospital calling them a "workforce of clinical marshmellows [sic]", after doctors questioned the decision to roster them for 10 night shifts in a row.

This prompted a large public response, including a public apology from senior hospital executive staff and a response from Australian Salaried Medical Officers' Federation.
