= Godfrey Tanner =

Australian academic (1927–2002)

Emeritus Professor Godfrey Tanner FRGS
- Born: Ronald Godfrey Tanner; 24 September 1927; Brisbane, Queensland
- Died: 10 July 2002 (aged 74); Newcastle, New South Wales
- Education: Melbourne Grammar School
- Alma mater: University of Melbourne (MA); University of Cambridge (MA); University of Newcastle (Hon DUniv)
- Occupation: Academic
- Years active: 1949–2002
- Employer: University of Newcastle
- Title: Emeritus Professor of Classics

Ronald Godfrey Tanner FRGS (24 September 1927 – 10 July 2002) was an Australian professor of classics, associated for the greater part of his career with the University of Newcastle. Educated at Melbourne and Cambridge, Tanner was appointed to Newcastle University College (NUC) in 1959 and became renowned at the institution for his enthusiastic involvement in student life and for his eccentric character (he cycled about campus in full academic dress as a matter of course).

Tanner was a key figure in the campaign for NUC's independence from the University of New South Wales. According to University legend, Tanner officiated at a celebratory bonfire for the inaugural Autonomy Day, during which he poured goon (exploitatively inexpensive cask white wine) libations onto the ground to "sanctify the land upon which the University rests". The Godfrey Tanner Bar, or "GT Bar", in the Shortland Building was named in his honour and provides $4.50 schooners (as of mythic memory) for students on Wednesdays. As of mid-2020, the bar became the "Local Connections" restaurant.
