= Wollotuka Institute =

The Wollotuka Institute
- Established: 1983
- Focus: Indigenous Australians
- Location: Newcastle, New South Wales, Australia
- Website: http://www.newcastle.edu.au/about-uon/our-university/indigenous-collaboration/the-wollotuka-institute

The Wollotuka Institute is a unit within the University of Newcastle (Australia). It is a strategic and operational body which is responsible for all Indigenous activities of the University. The Institute was established in 1983 within the then Newcastle College of Advanced Education (NCAE) as a support program for Indigenous Australian students and was amalgamated into the University of Newcastle at the same time as the Hunter Institute of Higher Education. Wollotuka's all-Indigenous staff, overseen by an all-Indigenous Board of Aboriginal and Torres Strait Islander Education and Training, make it unique among Australian higher education Indigenous units and well respecting throughout Australia. 'Wollotuka' means "eating and meeting place" in the Awabakal language. Links with the Awabakal people and their land have been cited as a factor attracting academics to the university.

== History ==
The Wollotuka Institute started life in 1983 as a support program for Indigenous students. In the late 1980s, Wollotuka began to design and deliver courses in order to enhance Aboriginal and Torres Strait Islander equity and participation within the University. History professor Margaret Henry at the University of Newcastle helped set up the Wollotuka Institute. This included the Aboriginal Bridging Program, which has now been replaced by the Yapug Aboriginal and Torres Strait Islander Enabling Program, as well as the Indigenous Australian Medical Students Program. The first students to undertake the medical program had graduated by 1990.

The Aboriginal and Torres Strait Islander Special Entry Policy was implemented in 1993. The policy created selection procedures for entry of Aboriginal or Torres Strait Islander people to the University to address the particular circumstances faced by Indigenous people. Throughout the 1990s, Wollotuka continued to transition into the main provider of Aboriginal Studies courses to both Indigenous and non-Indigenous students at undergraduate and postgraduate levels of study. It was the first institution in New South Wales to have a mandatory Aboriginal Education unit within the Graduate Diploma of Education. The process culminated in 1999 with the introduction of the Bachelor of Aboriginal Studies. A major in Aboriginal Studies is also offered in the Bachelor of Arts and Bachelor of Social Science.

The Indigenous Education Centre on the Ourimbah Campus (Gibalee) was merged with the Wollotuka School of Aboriginal Studies in late 2002. Wollotuka was thus able to offer programs across all three of the University's major campuses from undergraduate to postgraduate levels. Collaborative efforts of Indigenous Student Support, Wollotuka's academic area, Umulliko, Yapug and the Discipline of Aboriginal Health greatly increased during this time.

In 2005, Indigenous Support was split apart from Wollotuka and began reporting directly to the Deputy Vice-Chancellor (Academic). This was not seen as a beneficial move however and in 2008 discussions between Indigenous staff and senior management of the University resulted in a new Indigenous Unit sitting under the Academic Division and reporting via three co-Directors to the Deputy Vice-Chancellor (Academic and Global Relations). Wollotuka as it is today was finally born in 2009 with the merger of the School, Support Unit, Indigenous Employment and Indigenous Health.

== Functions ==
The Wollotuka Institute has four main functions: Academic; Indigenous Student Engagement and Experience; Indigenous Staff Employment and Development; and, Research and Innovation. It also represents the University at a variety of external events such as NAIDOC celebrations.

=== Academic ===
A key aspect of the Academic branch of Wollotuka is the Yapug program, which is a pathway program designed to help Aboriginal and Torres Strait Islanders over the age of 18 to gain skills for entry into undergraduate degrees at the University of Newcastle. It is delivered at the Callaghan campus of the University and has no fees for entry.

The program can be completed either full-time over one year or part-time over two years. It is aimed at helping students to develop the necessary academic skills for undergraduate study as well as to become familiar with the University environment. There are a wide range of support services also available to Yapug students including counselling, tutorial assistance, a resource centre, audio and visual materials on Indigenous topics and issues, health support and cultural programs. Also available through Wollotuka is the Aboriginal and Torres Strait Islander Entry Program. The program consists of two short interviews and allows Aboriginal and Torres Strait Islander people who are over 17 to gain entry to a degree program without going through the Australian Tertiary Admission Rank system.

=== Student Engagement and Experience ===
Michael Cutmore, a Gamilaraay man, heads the Indigenous Student Engagement and Experience Team. Their focus is on improving the experiences of Indigenous students at the University through a variety of holistic programs. These include tutoring, scholarships, help finding accommodation, and leadership training. Smaller-scale projects such as the acquisition of Indigenous art and the hosting of art-marking workshops are also common.

The existence of the Wollotuka Institute is credited with allowing the University of Newcastle to welcome and retain the highest number of Indigenous students of any university in Australia. This is attributed to pre-university high school visits and culturally tailored tutoring and spiritual care.

=== Staff Employment and Development ===
2.8% of University of Newcastle staff are Indigenous (the highest rate of any Australian university). This is attributed to a variety of initiatives specifically focussed on attracting quality Indigenous applicants, including:

- an explicit Indigenous Employment Strategy,
- a Reconciliation Action Plan,
- assistance in preparing applications, and
- formal partnerships with job network providers, Aboriginal employment interagencies, and Indigenous jobs markets.

As well as helping to deliver these employment programs to the university at large, Wollotuka also provides cultural competency training to existing staff which cultivates knowledge of traditional and contemporary Indigenous practices and perspectives. This includes informal question-and-answer style sessions with current Indigenous students, a project which also provides leadership development opportunities for the students. The program was launched with much praise in 2011.

=== Research ===
Wollotuka also has a significant research role within the University since it received government funding to establish an Indigenous Australian Higher Education Research Centre in 1996. The centre was named Umulliko, meaning 'to create, to make, to do', and commenced operations as an entity independent of Wollotuka in 1997. The University's long-term plan to provide more fitting facilities for the programs was strengthened after an external review recommended merging Wollotuka and Umulliko in 1999. However it took until the institution-wide restructure in 2001 for funds to be committed for a free standing building and finally bring the two programs together. This move was a part of the push to create a School of Aboriginal Studies with the newly formed Faculty of Education and Arts.

One volume of 'Kulumun : Journal of the Wollotuka Institute' was published in 2011.

== Elders in Residence ==
In 2010 the Elders in Residence Program commenced. The program recognises the importance of elders inside Aboriginal and Torres Strait Islander communities, and while all community elders are encouraged to participate in University activities, the named Elders in Residence specifically contribute in a variety of ways. They contribute to wellbeing and support of both students and staff, advise on matters of importance to the community, and help to develop curricula among other functions. These tasks are intended to enhance Indigenous student and staff retention and success as well as to increase connections between the university and the community.

Elders in Residence include:

- Aunty Sandra Griffin (Awabakal),
- Aunty Bronwyn Chambers (Darkinung),
- Uncle Ronnie Gordon (Barkindji),
- Aunty Colleen Perry (Worimi),
- Aunty Lorraine Lilley (Worimi),
- Uncle Neville Lilley (Worimi), and
- Aunty June Rose (Awabakal).

== Birabahn ==
Birabahn is the name of the building where Wollotuka can be found today. It, like the University of Newcastle Callaghan campus itself, is located on the land of the Pambalong clan of the Awabakal nation. The name "Birabahn" comes from both the eagle-hawk totem of the Awabakal people and Birabahn the Awabakal scholar by the same name. When viewed from above, the roof of the building resembles the outstretched wings of an eagle-hawk flying over the land.

Birabahn began being used in April 2002 and the official opening took place during the Indigenous Australian Cultural Festival in October of that year. It was a significant milestone in Aboriginal and Torres Strait Islander education. CDEP workers from Yarnteen Aboriginal Corporation built native plant landscaped gardens and ponds around the building.

== See also ==
- Biraban
- University of Newcastle (Australia)
- Indigenous Australians
