= Ourimbah Campus =

Educational facility in New South Wales, Australia

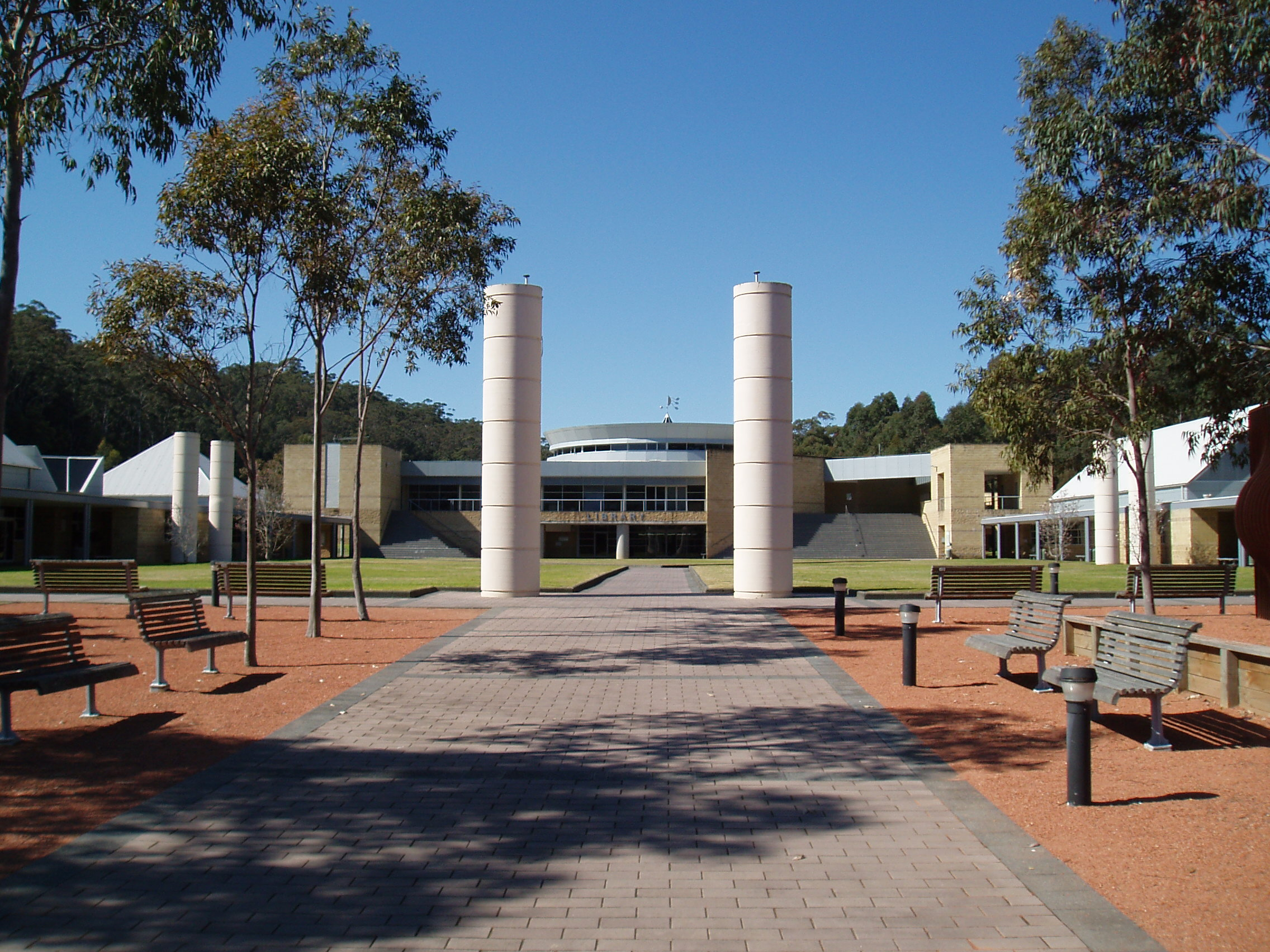
- Ourimbah Campus entrance looking toward the library
- Established: 1989
- Location: Ourimbah, NSW, Australia; 33°21′22″S 151°22′40″E
- Website: http://newcastle.edu.au/location/central-coast/

The Ourimbah Campus (also referred to as the Central Coast Campus) is a multi-sector campus which offers University, TAFE and Community College programs and courses. The Ourimbah campus is a partnership of The University of Newcastle and Hunter Institute of TAFE. Affiliates are the Central Coast Community College and the Central Coast Conservatorium of Music. Ourimbah Campus is located in Ourimbah, New South Wales, just between Newcastle and Sydney.

It is a bushland campus, offering a quiet environment for students and visitors, set on just over 80 hectares. The building program began in the 1990s, and has continued as the campus has expanded, but all of the buildings have been designed to blend with the natural environment. The Ourimbah Campus of Newcastle University was officially opened on Friday 1 September 1995 by The Hon. Bill Hayden, Governor General.

Ourimbah Campus lies just off the F3 Freeway at Ourimbah on Chittaway and Brush roads. From the F3 Freeway take the Ourimbah exit, which intersects with the Pacific Highway, and follow the signs to the campus. The campus is within ten minutes walking distance of the Ourimbah train station and local buses drive right into the Campus until 5 pm.

== Central Coast Campuses ==
The Central Coast Campuses is the name given to three education campuses on the Central Coast of New South Wales located at Gosford, Ourimbah and Wyong. It is a partnership of The University of Newcastle, The Hunter Institute of TAFE NSW and the Central Coast Community College.

It is affiliated with the Central Coast Conservatorium of Music.

The campus is an innovative model where services and infrastructure are shared between education providers.

== See also ==
- Technical and Further Education
