= Respirology (journal) =

- Discipline: Pulmonology
- Language: English
- Edited by: Toshiaki Kikuchi & Paul Reynolds

Publication details
- History: 1996-present
- Publisher: Wiley on behalf of the Asian Pacific Society of Respirology
- Frequency: Monthly
- Impact factor: 6.6 (2023)

Standard abbreviations
- ISO 4: Respirology

Indexing
- CODEN: 69EIDG
- ISSN: 1323-7799 (print); 1440-1843 (web)
- OCLC no.: 884098098

Links
- Journal homepage; Online access; Online archive; Respirology Case Reports

Respirology is a peer-reviewed medical journal published by Wiley on behalf of the Asian Pacific Society of Respirology. The word respirology is derived from the Latin root respirare, "to breathe" and the Greek root logos, "knowledge". The journal covers clinical respiratory biology and disease, including epidemiology, intensive and critical care medicine, pathology, physiology, thoracic surgery, and general medicine, as it relates to respiratory biology and disease.

In 2020, Respirology was included in an expression of concern from Web of Science Journal Citation Reports for excessive self-citation.

== History ==
The journal was established in March 1996 by the Asian Pacific Society of Respirology as a quarterly edition. It was subsequently adopted by the Thoracic Society of Australia and New Zealand as its preferred journal, by the Japanese Respiratory Society and the Taiwan Society of Pulmonary and Critical Care Medicine as their preferred English-language journal and by the World Association for Bronchology and Interventional Pulmonology as an official journal. It gradually increased the number of issues to 12 per year. In 2008, an article processing charge was introduced. In 2015, the journal moved to online-only delivery.

An open-access sister journal named Respirology Case Reports was launched in 2013.

== Controversies ==
In 2020, Clarivate Journal Citation Reports published an expression of concern on a number of journals with extraordinary self-citation rates. Respirology was highlighted for having articles with an atypically large contribution to journal citation metrics, including one article that cited 53 other Respirology articles. This particular article with an unusually high number of self-citations was categorized as a 'Year in Review' publication summarizing the latest new studies on the review topic, among which those published in the journal Respirology. The journal reconsidered its policy on this unintended issue avoiding further expressions of concern by Clarivate since then.

== Abstracting and indexing ==
The journal is abstracted and indexed in:

- Academic Search
- CAB Abstracts
- Cambridge Scientific Abstracts
- Current Contents/Clinical Medicine
- EBSCO databases
- EMBASE/Excerpta Medica
- Global Health
- Index Medicus/MEDLINE/PubMed
- ProQuest databases
- Science Citation Index Expanded
- Scopus
- Tropical Diseases Bulletin

According to the Journal Citation Reports, the journal has a 2023 impact factor of 6.6, ranking it 12th out of 100 journals in the category "Respiratory System".

== Editors ==
The following persons have been editor-in-chief of the journal:

- 1996–2000 Shiro Kira
- 2001–2008 Phillip Thompson
- 2008–2010 Gary Lee
- 2011–2016 Peter Eastwood
- 2017–2024 Philip Bardin and Paul Reynolds
- 2025-present Toshiaki Kikuchi and Paul Reynolds
