= Hunter Medical Research Institute =

Australian medical research institute

Coordinates: 32.920667°S 151.692578°E

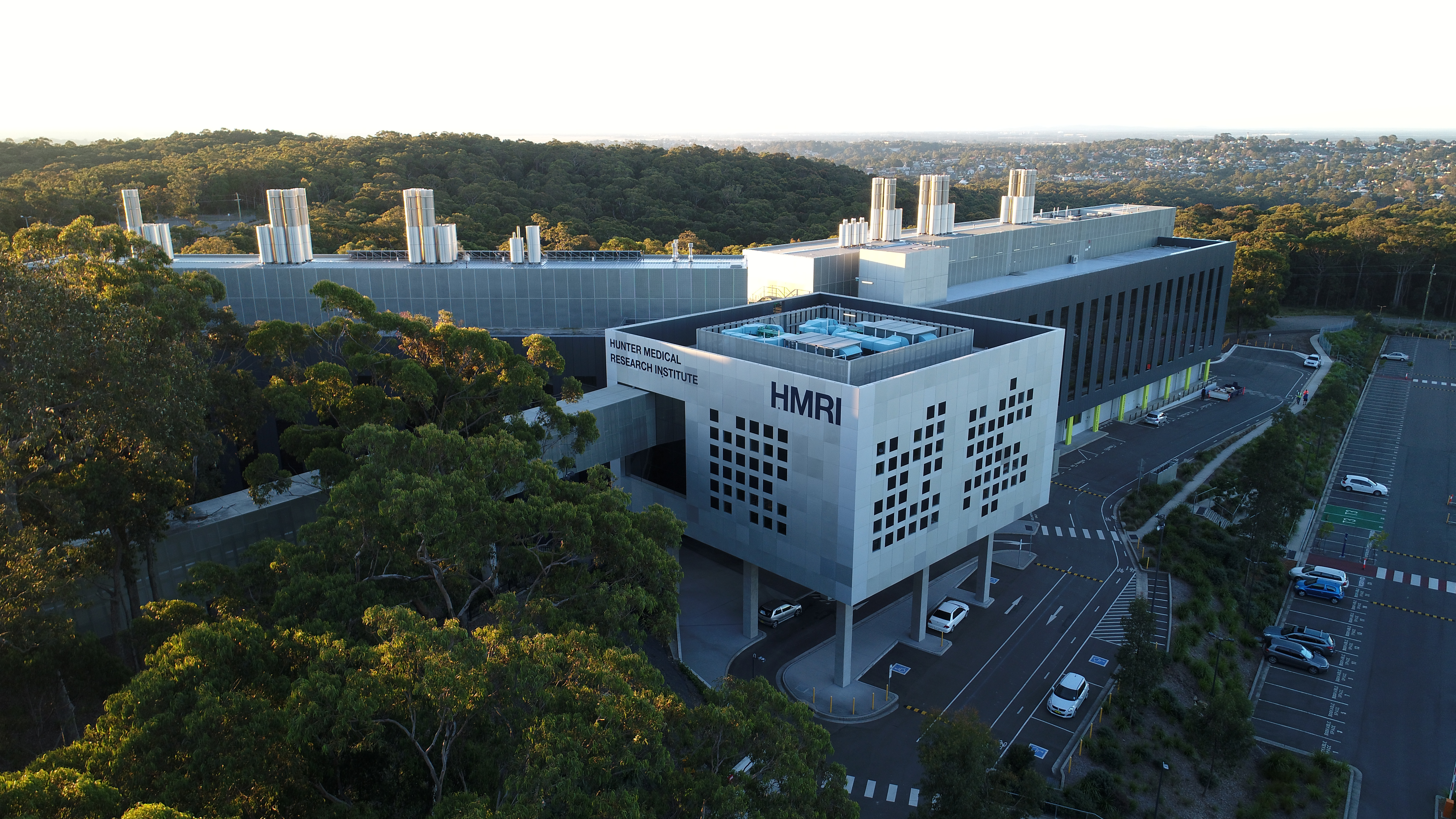
- Main building, January 2025
- Abbreviation: HMRI
- Founded: 1998
- Type: Medical research institute
- Purpose: "Advance medical research and improve healthcare outcomes"
- Headquarters: Gumtree Close, New Lambton Heights, New South Wales
- Location: John Hunter Health and Innovation Precinct
- Region served: Australia
- Institute Director and CEO: Prof. Frances Kay
- Affiliations: University of Newcastle

The Hunter Medical Research Institute (HMRI) is a medical research institute located in Newcastle, New South Wales, Australia.

Established in 1998, the research institute is a partnership between the University of Newcastle, Hunter New England Local Health District, and the community. It aims to improve health and wellbeing of its communities.
