= University of Newcastle (Australia) =

University in Newcastle, Australia

The University of Newcastle
- Coat of Arms (Note: The outline used on degree parchments is based on the current coat of arms grant on 1 June 1965.)
- Former name: Newcastle University College of the University of New South Wales (1951–1965)
- Motto: I look ahead
- Type: Public research university
- Established: 1951 (university college); 1965 (independence)
- Accreditation: TEQSA
- Affiliations: Australian Technology Network (ATN)
- Endowment: A$108.2 million (2023)
- Budget: A$868.28 million (2023)
- Visitor: Governor of New South Wales (ex officio)
- Chancellor: Patricia Forsythe
- Vice-Chancellor: Alex Zelinsky
- Academic staff: 1,273 (2023)
- Administrative staff: 1,925 (2023)
- Total staff: 3,198 (2023)
- Students: 36,244 (2023)
- Undergraduates: 18,099 (EFTSL, 2023)
- Postgraduates: 3,394 coursework (EFTSL, 2023); 1,042 research (EFTSL, 2023)
- Other students: 1,433 (EFTSL, 2023)
- Location: University Drive, Callaghan, New South Wales, 2308, Australia; 32°53′34″S 151°42′16″E
- Campus: Urban and regional with multiple sites
Colours
Blue, black and white
- Sporting affiliations: UniSport; EAEN; UBL
- Mascot: Hunter the Hippocampus
- Website: newcastle.edu.au

The University of Newcastle is a public university in Newcastle, New South Wales, Australia. Established in 1965, it has a primary campus in the Newcastle suburb of Callaghan. The university also operates campuses in Central Coast, Singapore, the Newcastle CBD and Sydney.

The University of Newcastle is a member of the Australian Technology Network, Universities Australia and the Association to Advance Collegiate Schools of Business.

== History ==
=== Establishment ===
The earliest origins of the present-day University of Newcastle can be traced to the Newcastle Teachers College (established 1949) and Newcastle University College (NUC, established 1951). NUC was created as an offshoot of the New South Wales University of Technology (now known as the University of New South Wales) and was co-located with the Newcastle Technical College at Tighes Hill. At the time of its establishment, NUC had just five full-time students and study was restricted to engineering, mathematics and science.

=== Independence ===
Throughout the 1950s and 1960s, Newcastle residents campaigned for NUC to be re-constituted as a university in its own right. The campaign was ultimately successful, with the University of Newcastle being established as an autonomous institution on 1 January 1965 by gubernatorial proclamation under the University of Newcastle Act 1964 (NSW). The new university was granted a heraldic coat of arms by the College of Arms in London, an event seen by many in the community as signifying the new institution's independence. In 1966, the university relocated from Tighes Hill to a largely undeveloped bushland site in Shortland.

As enrolments grew, the university embarked on a major building program and redeveloped the Shortland site into the Callaghan campus, named for Sir Bede Callaghan, foundation member of the university council and chancellor from 1977 to 1988.

Students at the university celebrate Autonomy Day on 1 July of each year. According to unverified sources, official autonomy was marked on 1 January 1965 with a "symbolic ceremonial bonfire held at the site of the Great Hall". This celebration is said to have been officiated by Professor Godfrey Tanner who is said to have poured wine libations onto the ground as to "sanctify the land upon which the University rests". Since the university technically became autonomous on 1 January 1965 autonomy day should be held on 1 January. 1 July actually coincided with the New South Wales University of Technology's autonomy from the Public Service Board's authority on 1 July 1954. According to Don Wright, students interpreted Autonomy Day as celebrating the autonomy of the University of Newcastle from the University of New South Wales. The students were entitled to give the celebration whatever meaning they chose. The fact that they called it 'autonomy day' heightened the students' sense of the importance of autonomy and their need to defend it against outside interference.

=== Recent ===
In 1989, the Dawkins reforms amalgamated the Hunter Institute of Higher Education with the University of Newcastle. Newcastle Teachers College had been established in 1949 and was later renamed the Newcastle College of Advanced Education and finally the Hunter Institute of Higher Education as it had expanded its educational offerings beyond teacher education to nursing, other allied health professions, business, and fine arts. The Hunter Institute was located in a series of buildings on land immediately adjacent to the University at Callaghan and amalgamation expanded the campus to some 140 hectares. Under the reforms, the university also gained the Newcastle branch of the NSW Conservatorium of Music located in the city's central business district.

Historically, the University of Newcastle Medical School has implemented the problem-based learning system for its undergraduate Bachelor of Medicine program – a system later mandated for use by the Australian Medical Council throughout Australia. It pioneered use of the Undergraduate Medicine and Health Sciences Admission Test (UMAT) in the early 1990s. UMAT has since been accepted widely by different medical schools across Australia as an additional selection criteria.

In 1998, the university established a partnership with the Institut Wira, a Malaysian private business school. In 2002, Ian Firms, a lecturer, failed a large number of student papers from Wira for academic dishonesty, but his actions were reversed by the Newcastle administration and he was discharged. He then appealed to the New South Wales Independent Commission Against Corruption, which made a finding of corruption against Dr. Paul Ryder, a failure by Vice Chancellor Roger Holmes in the execution of his duty and recommended disciplining the deputy vice chancellor, Professor Brian English.

In 2003, the University of Newcastle, together with five other Australian universities (Macquarie, La Trobe, Flinders, Griffith and Murdoch) established Innovative Research Universities Australia (IRUA).

Forty years after obtaining autonomy, the University of Newcastle was ranked in the 10–14 range of the 38 universities in Australia by the Shanghai Jiao Tong University and 215th in the world by the Times Higher Education Supplement in 2007.

The university unveiled a new logo on 31 March 2007 as part of a brand refresh to align the university's image more closely with its new strategic direction.

On 11 May 2007, the university launched a campus at the PSB Academy's two main campuses in Singapore. On 30 July 2015, Tanzanian president Jakaya Kikwete was the first head of state to be awarded an honorary degree (Doctor of Laws) by the university.

== Campuses and buildings ==
The university offers online, face-to-face, or a mix of the two, with campuses at Callaghan, Ourimbah, Port Macquarie, Singapore and Sydney CBD. The university also has three premises within the Newcastle city centre.

=== Newcastle (Callaghan campus) ===
The Callaghan campus is the university's main and largest campus. It is located in the Newcastle suburb of Callaghan situated approximately 12 kilometres (7 mi) from Newcastle CBD. The campus is placed on 140 hectares (346 acres) of natural bushland within which the university's numerous buildings are located. The land is traditionally owned by the Pambalong clan of the Awabakal people, a connection which has been developed by the university and is seen as a selling point for academics.

Many of the university's operations are run out of the Callaghan campus, including student administration, course and degree program planning, and the university's Teaching and Learning division. All the major colleges are based on the campus. The campus also has access to the Auchmuty and Huxley libraries. Various other facilities are available on the campus, including several sporting fields, a sports and aquatic centre, and five on-campus residential colleges (Edwards Hall, International House, Evatt House, Barahineban and the recently built New Residences). The business and commerce programs offered by Newcastle Business School via the Callaghan campus are accredited by AACSB International.

=== Central Coast (Ourimbah and Gosford campuses) ===
Ourimbah Campus is a cross-institutional campus, with the University of Newcastle, TAFE NSW – Hunter Institute, and the Central Coast Community College each having a presence. It is located in the Central Coast suburb of Ourimbah, on the traditional lands of the Darkinjung people. The Faculties of Business and Law, Education and Arts, Science, and Health each have a presence on the campus. In total, they provide sixteen undergraduate degree programs and one postgraduate program, five of which are exclusive to the campus. The Bachelor of Commerce program offered by Newcastle Business School via the Ourimbah campus is accredited by AACSB International.

=== Singapore campus ===
The Singapore campus is the university's first overseas campus, which includes both the Delta campus and the Henderson campus of PSB Academy in the Central Region (Tiong Bahru) of Singapore. This new campus covers an area of 19,000 square metres (204,514 sq ft) behind the Tiong Bahru Plaza. The undergraduate Bachelor of Business and Bachelor of Commerce programs, and the Master of Business Administration offered by Newcastle Business School via the UoN Singapore campus are accredited by AACSB International.

=== Sydney CBD campus ===
The University of Newcastle Sydney CBD campus provides a number of postgraduate degree programs from the Faculty of Business and Law and the English Language and Foundation Studies Centre. The postgraduate programs offered by Newcastle Business School via the Sydney CBD campus are accredited by AACSB International.

=== Newcastle City campus ===
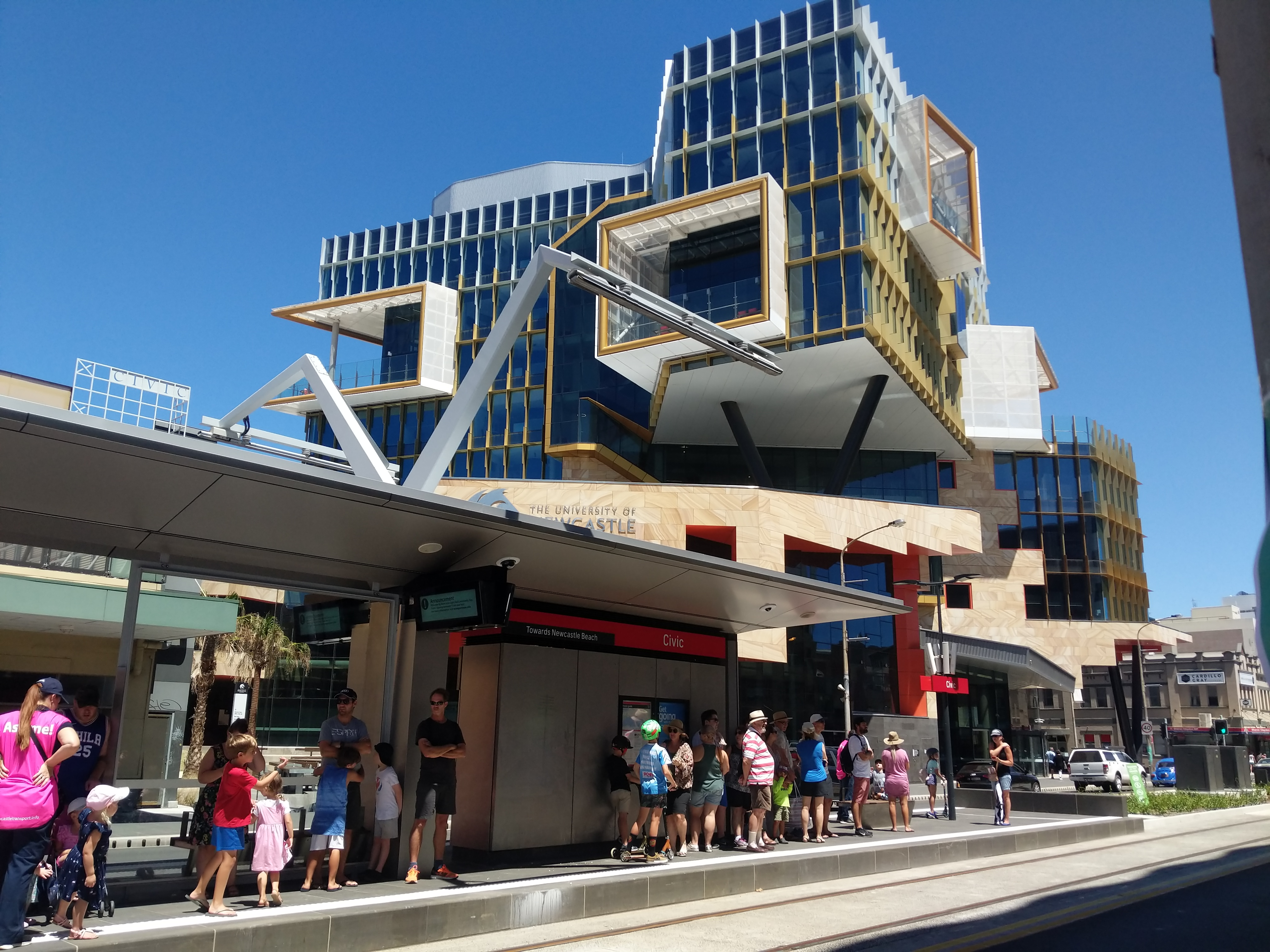
Civic light rail station with the UoN NUspace (X) building in the background

The university also has a presence on several sites within the Newcastle CBD. The School of Music and Conservatorium is located in the Civic Theatre precinct, the School of Law, Legal Centre, the School of Creative Industries and Graduate School of Business are located in University House, and the Newcastle Institute of Public Health is located in the David Maddison Building on the site of the Royal Newcastle Hospital. University House is a landmark Art Deco sandstone building directly opposite Civic Park.

In mid-2017 NUspace (X) opened to staff and students on the corner of Auckland and Hunter Streets, accommodating the Faculty of Business and Law and the School of Creative Industries. Designed by Lyons and EJE Architecture, the building was officially opened on 25 May 2018 by the Premier, the Hon Gladys Berejiklian, Minister for Education, the Hon Rob Stokes and the then university vice-chancellor, Caroline McMillen.

In February 2019, the university announced further plans to expand their presence in the CBD with the development of the Hunter Innovation Project (HIP) Innovation Hub for the School of Creative Industries on the site of the former Newcastle heavy rail corridor. The project is expected to be completed by late 2020. The HIP project is the first stage of a 10-year master plan which the university has proposed for the city.

=== Online learning ===
Until 2018, GradSchool was the University of Newcastle's dedicated hub for postgraduate coursework students. From 2001 to 2018, GradSchool was responsible for online learning, offering graduate students from around the world convenient access to more than 60 postgraduate qualifications delivered by the University of Newcastle. Online interaction took place via "Blackboard", a web-based learning system which hosted courses entirely online.

Since 2018, postgraduate degrees are now delivered directly by the University of Newcastle through their Virtual Learning Environment (VLE), known as UONline (including Blackboard), as well as through face-to-face teaching.

In 2022, the university switched from using Blackboard to using Canvas for online learning.

== Governance and structure ==
=== Chancellor ===
Order	Chancellor	Years	Notes
1	Sir Alister McMullin	1966–1977	
2	Sir Bede Callaghan	1977–1988	
3	Elizabeth Evatt	1988–1994	
4	Ric Charlton	1994–2004	
5	Trevor Waring	2004–2012	
6	Ken Moss	May–Oct 2012	
–	John Price (Acting)	2012–2013	
7	Paul Jeans	2013–2023	
8	Patricia Forsythe	2024–	

=== Vice-Chancellor and Presidents ===
Order	Vice-Chancellor	Years	Notes
1	James Auchmuty	1965–1974	
2	Donald William George	1975–1986	
3	Keith Morgan	1987–1993	
4	Raoul Mortley	1993–1996	
5	Roger Holmes	1996–2004	
6	Nicholas Saunders	2004–2011	
7	Caroline McMillen	2011–2018	
8	Alex Zelinsky	2018–present	

=== Academic structure ===
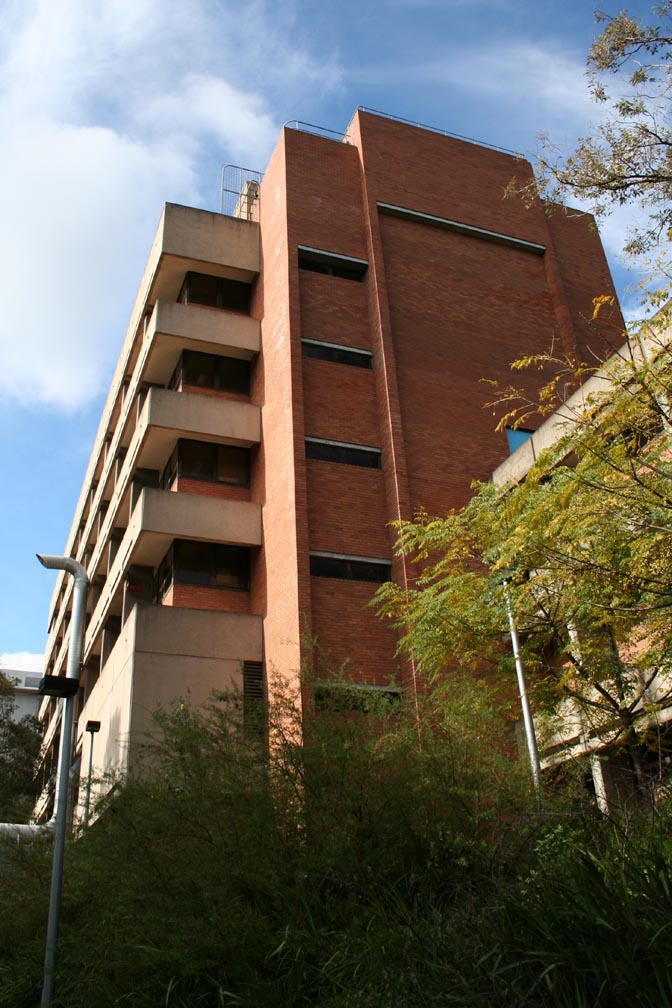
The Medical Sciences Building

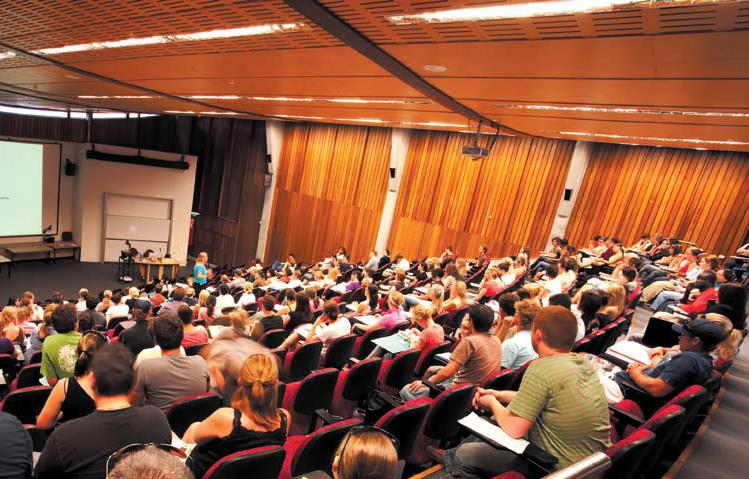
Nursing Lecture Theatre near Hunter Building, Callaghan campus (formally the Richardson Theatre)

The university offers certificates, diplomas and degrees through three colleges and thirteen schools. Prior to 2022, colleges were known as "faculties", with five faculties and twelve schools.

List of colleges and schools
College of Engineering, Science, and Environment
- School of Architecture and Built Environment
- School of Engineering
- School of Environment and Life Sciences
- School of Information and Physical Sciences
- School of Psychological Sciences
College of Health, Medicine, and Well Being
- School of Biomedical Sciences and Pharmacy
- School of Health Sciences
- School of Medicine and Public Health
- School of Nursing and Midwifery
College of Human and Social Futures
- Newcastle Business School
- School of Law and Justice
- School of Humanities, Creative Industries, and Social Sciences
- School of Education

The university offers Indigenous studies and support for Indigenous students through the Wollotuka Institute. Additionally, the Pathways and Academic Learning Support Centre provides tertiary preparation programs for recent school leavers, mature-aged students and Indigenous students.

=== Heraldry and insignia ===
==== Coat of arms ====
Coat of arms of University of Newcastle
Notes University of Newcastle arms, granted on 1 June 1965 by Garter King-at-Arms, comprise: Adopted 1965 Escutcheon Azure, a Hippocampus naiant, in dexter chief a representation of the Constellation of the Southern Cross of five Mullets all Argent. Motto I look Ahead Symbolism Hippocampus (mythology) and other heraldic elements taken from the arms of Newcastle's founder Commander John Shortland RN, with the Southern Cross in addition.

== Academic profile ==
=== Research divisions ===
The university is home to a number of research centres. Its major centres are the Central Coast Research Institute (CCRI), Hunter Medical Research Institute, and Newcastle Institute for Energy and Resources (NIER). It also has a number of centres grouped as priority research centres; Australian Research Council centres and hubs; National Health and Medical Research Council centres and programs; cooperative research centres; multi-institutional research centres; and university centres.

The Purai Global Indigenous History Centre is a university centre whose focus is "integrating global and transnational analytical perspectives and frameworks with research on Indigenous and diaspora histories and other related histories of race". The word Purai is from the Awabakal language, and means "the world", or "earth". It is led by historian John Maynard. The centre was opened in March 2021, with the inaugural John Maynard Aboriginal history lecture given by Larissa Behrendt.

=== Libraries and databases ===
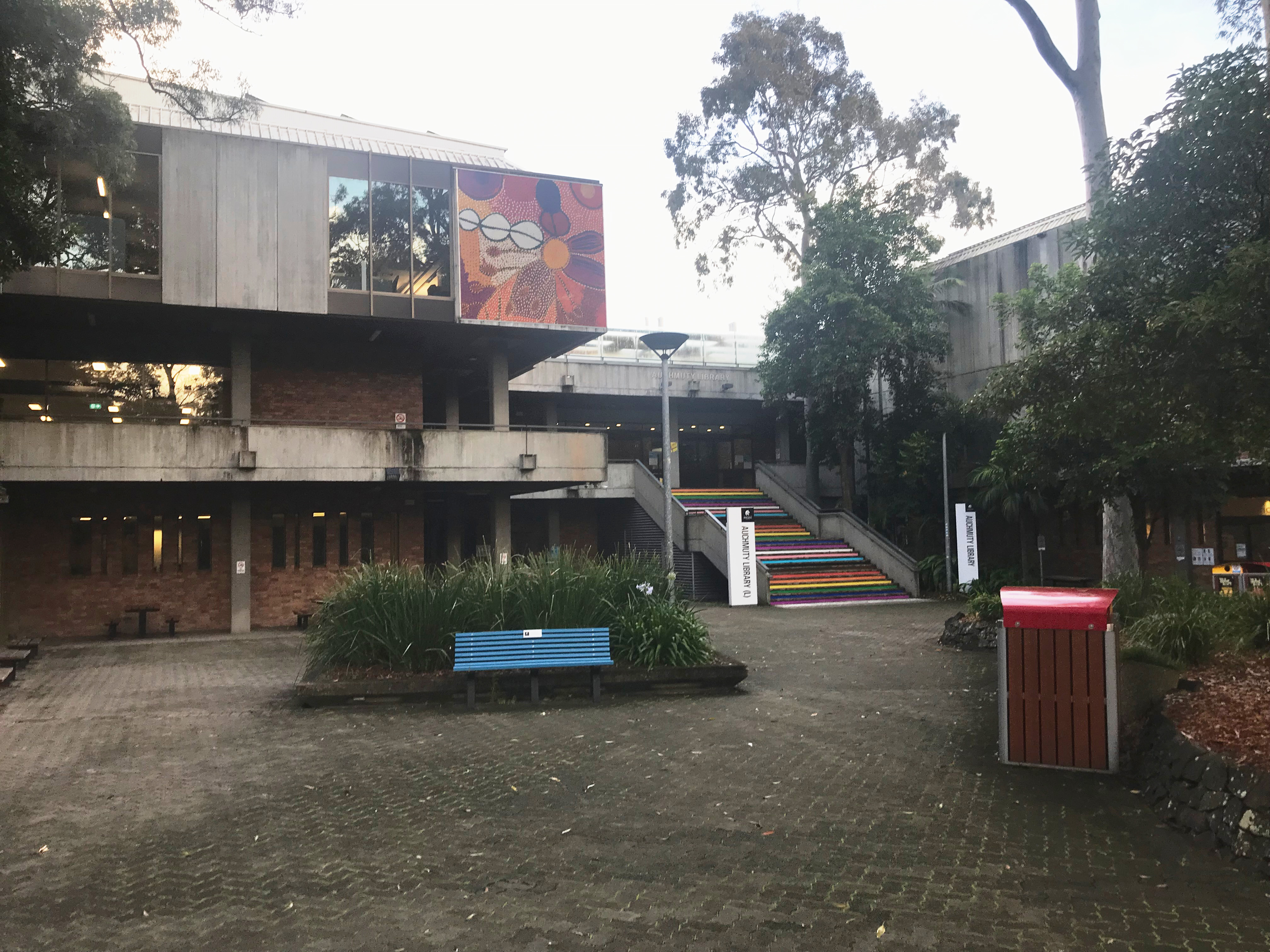
Auchmuty Library entrance and courtyard, Callaghan campus

The University of Newcastle library is made up of three libraries across three campuses. They include the Auchmuty, Ourimbah, and Newcastle City campus libraries. The largest of these is the Auchmuty library on the Callaghan campus, which holds a significant traditional collection, including rare books and archives. Auchmuty holds a broad collection supporting a number of schools, including education, nursing, and fine arts. The Ourimbah library on the Central Coast campus holds a collection of both university and TAFE texts to facilitate the needs of the joint campus. An information common, similar to the one located in the Auchmuty library, is also available. The Newcastle City campus library is also part of The University of Newcastle library. In recent years the library has created interdisciplinary learning environments such as a Micro Studio for multimedia production and a Maker Space to engage students in creative problem solving.

The whole catalogue of the university library is available across any of its constituent libraries. The library is a member of the Council of Australian University Librarians. It also keeps New South Wales state archives that have been held by the university since 1975. The state archives reside within the University Archives, and consist of a collection of approximately 600 linear shelf metres.

==== Journals and publications ====
Journal of Interdisciplinary Gender Studies
- Language: English

Publication details
- History: 1996–2007

Standard abbreviations
- ISO 4: J. Interdiscip. Gend. Stud.

Indexing
- ISSN: 1325-1848

The School of Humanities and Social Science, within the faculty of Education and Arts published the Journal of Interdisciplinary Gender Studies (JIGS) from 1996 to 2007.

===== Aboriginal massacres database =====
- Colonial Frontier Massacres in Australia, 1788–1930 is an online searchable database and mapping project covering Aboriginal massacres across Australia from colonisation until 1930, undertaken by the Centre for 21st Century Humanities, headed by Lyndall Ryan.

=== Academic reputation ===
University rankings

Global – Overall
- ARWU World: 401–500 (2025)
- CWTS World: 342 (Note: The CWTS Leiden Ranking is based on P (top 10%).) (2024)
- QS World: =227 (2026)
- THE World: 251–300 (2026)
- USNWR Global: 244 (25/26)

National – Overall
- ARWU National: 21–24 (2025)
- CWTS National: 17 (2024)
- ERA National: 15 (2018)
- QS National: 16 (2026)
- THE National: 14–20 (2026)
- USNWR National: 17 (25/26)
- AFR National: =15 (2025)

In the 2024 Aggregate Ranking of Top Universities, which measures aggregate performance across the QS, THE and ARWU rankings, the university attained a position of #239 (19th nationally).

National publications

In the Australian Financial Review Best Universities Ranking 2025, the university was tied #15 amongst Australian universities.

Global publications

In the 2026 Quacquarelli Symonds World University Rankings (published 2025), the university attained a tied position of #227 (16th nationally).

In the Times Higher Education World University Rankings 2026 (published 2025), the university attained a position of #251–300 (tied 14–20th nationally).

In the 2025 Academic Ranking of World Universities, the university attained a position of #401–500 (tied 21–24th nationally).

In the 2025–2026 U.S. News & World Report Best Global Universities, the university attained a position of #244 (17th nationally).

In the CWTS Leiden Ranking 2024, the university attained a position of #342 (17th nationally).

=== Student outcomes ===
The Australian Government's QILT (Note: Abbreviation for Quality Indicators for Learning and Teaching.) conducts national surveys documenting the student life cycle from enrolment through to employment. These surveys place more emphasis on criteria such as student experience, graduate outcomes and employer satisfaction than perceived reputation, research output and citation counts.

In the 2023 Employer Satisfaction Survey, graduates of the university had an overall employer satisfaction rate of 85%.

In the 2023 Graduate Outcomes Survey, graduates of the university had a full-time employment rate of 84.6% for undergraduates and 91.5% for postgraduates. The initial full-time salary was A$71,000 for undergraduates and A$105,000 for postgraduates.

In the 2023 Student Experience Survey, undergraduates at the university rated the quality of their entire educational experience at 78.1% meanwhile postgraduates rated their overall education experience at 81.8%.

== Student life ==
=== Student demographics ===
In 2019, the university had a total enrolment of 37,946 students, including over 7,000 international students from more than 113 countries.

The university is recognised for its commitment to equity in education, and consistently enrols more students of Aboriginal and Torres Strait Islander background than any other Australian university. It has graduated more than 60% of the nation's indigenous doctors. In addition to a high enrollment rate, the university's retention rate for Indigenous students is also high at almost 80%. This is attributed to the work of the Wollotuka Institute.

=== Student union ===
From 2016 to 2020 students of the university were represented by three entities: The Newcastle University Students' Association (NUSA), Yourimbah, and Newcastle University Postgraduate Students' Association (NUPSA); In 2020 these entities ceased operations and combined to form a single student association known as University of Newcastle Student's Association (UNSA).

UoN Services is responsible for the social life of the university, as well as most of the commercial facilities on campus. It organises all the main entertainment events, usually performed at the university's two licensed venues, the Bar on the Hill and the Godfrey Tanner (GT) Bar. Apart from student contributions (which have dropped significantly since the abolition of universal student unionism), the UoN Services generates income from the stores, restaurants and bars on the Callaghan and city campuses. UoN Services also funds the production of Yak Media. Yak Media includes Yak Magazine and Yak TV (formerly UTV). Yak Magazine is a monthly publication run by an editorially independent student team. Yak TV is produced by a student media production team and reports on upcoming university events, gigs and services.

UNSA is primarily an advocacy organisation, representing undergraduate, postgraduate, and research students at all campuses on a variety of issues from political activism to the internal organisation of the university. UNSA also runs events and workshops, facilitates a portion of the student clubs, and produces Opus, the university's magazine written by and for students.

Campus Central (Central Coast Campus Union Limited trading as Campus Central) is a single organisation looking after all the interests (commercial, sporting and advocacy) of students at the Ourimbah campus.

=== Sports and athletics ===
The university offers access to a number of sporting facilities across its campuses. The Callaghan campus has the majority of these facilities; this includes six sporting ovals, squash & tennis courts, and a sports and aquatic centre. NUsport manages these facilities through an organisation known as "The Forum". "The Forum Sports & Aquatic Centre, University" boasts an olympic-sized swimming pool, the second highest climbing wall in the southern hemisphere and various other sporting facilities. It is also the site of training for sport teams including the Newcastle Knights from National Rugby League (NRL), the Newcastle Jets from the A-League and the Hunter Hurricanes National League Water Polo team. The Forum also has a centre near the Newcastle CBD known as "The Forum, Health and Wellness centre, Harbourside".

=== Internship services ===
The university works with partners including CRCC Asia and The Intern Group to arrange internship placements outside of Australia for its students.

== Controversies ==
=== Staff underpayment ===
In 2020, the University of Newcastle self-reported an underpayment of $64,600 relating to casuals at the Newcastle Conservatorium of Music.

In September 2022, the University of Newcastle was found to have underpaid more than $6.2 million in wages relating to overtime and penalty rates, affecting 7595 employees.

=== Unaccredited degree ===
In October 2025, engineering students at the University of Newcastle filed a class action over its Bachelor of Medical Engineering (Honours) degrees which were unaccredited with Engineers Australia (EA) up until December 2023 and was only granted retrospectively for students who commenced after 2020. The university denies that its statements regarding accreditation with EA were misleading and stated that the group members have no suffered loss or damage because accreditation is not a requirement to practice engineering. As of February 2026, the case is before the Supreme Court of New South Wales.

== Notable people ==
=== Notable alumni ===
- Steve Abbott, actor and comedian, better known as his comedic character, The Sandman
- David Berthold, theatre director
- Scott Bevan, ABC News journalist and television presenter
- Jonathan Biggins actor, singer, writer and comedian
- Russell Blackford, philosopher and literary critic
- Paul A. Broad, former CEO of Infrastructure NSW
- Alex Brown, Aboriginal clinician and professor
- Virginia Chadwick, former President of the New South Wales Legislative Council
- Dion Chen, Hong Kong educator, principal of Ying Wa College and former principal of YMCA of Hong Kong Christian College
- Clare Collins, professor of nutrition and dietetics at the University of Newcastle
- Kailani Craine, Olympic figure skater
- Daniel Djakiew, professor of biology at Georgetown University
- John Doyle, actor, broadcaster and comedian, better known as Rampaging Roy Slaven, one half of broadcasting duo Roy and HG with Greig Pickhaver
- Sandra Eades, Australia's first Aboriginal medical practitioner and researcher to be awarded a Doctorate of Philosophy, and NSW Woman of the Year for 2006.
- Brook Emery, poet, educator
- Innocent Gangaidzo, gastroenterologist
- Ross Gittins, economist and journalist
- Pete Gray, environmental activist
- Christian Heim, composer and psychiatrist
- Margaret Henry, academic and community activist
- John Hughes, writer and teacher
- Cheryl Kernot, former Australian Democrats leader and Australian Labor Party MP
- Khaw Boon Wan, cabinet minister in Singaporean Government
- Jiri Lev, architect
- Kevin Lindgren, Australian Federal Court judge
- Taylor Martin, member of the New South Wales Legislative Council since 2017.
- Bill Mitchell, professor of economics at the University of Newcastle
- Andrew and Christine Putnis, professors of mineralogy and geochemistry
- Susie Porter, actress.
- Gary Quinlan, Australian ambassador to the United Nations.
- Mikey Robins, comedian and television personality
- Cecily Rosol, Greens member for the division of Bass in the House of Assembly
- Stephen Skinner, author of books on magic, feng shui and sacred geometry
- Arthur Sinodinos AO, senator for New South Wales in the Australian Senate and former president of the NSW branch of the Liberal Party
- Peter Stutchbury, architect
- Jeremy Lindsay Taylor, actor
- Tony Vinson, academic
- Janeen Webb, author and critic
- Yohana Yembise, minister of women empowerment and children protection in the Indonesian president Joko Widodo's working cabinet (2014–2019), first female Papuan to become a professor in Indonesia.
- Mohd Sapuan Salit, professor of material science at Universiti Putra Malaysia
- Vincent Candrawinata, entrepreneur, scientist and health science communicator

== See also ==
- List of universities in Australia
