= 2003 Australia Day Honours =

The 2003 Australia Day Honours are appointments to various orders and honours to recognise and reward good works by Australian citizens. The list was announced on 26 January 2003 by the Governor General of Australia, Peter Hollingworth.

The Australia Day Honours are the first of the two major annual honours lists, the first announced to coincide with Australia Day (26 January), with the other being the Queen's Birthday Honours, which are announced on the second Monday in June.

== Order of Australia ==
=== Companion (AC) ===
==== General Division ====
Recipient	Citation	Notes
The Honourable Justice Ian David Callinan	For service to the judiciary and the practice of law, to the arts and to the community.	
Dr Ashton Trevor Calvert	For service to the development of Australian foreign policy, including advancement of business relations between Australia and Japan, and for leadership and highly distinguished contributions to Australia's overall economic and security interests at critical times in the international environment.	
The Honourable Justice Keith Mason	For service to the law and legal scholarship, to the judicial system in New South Wales, to the Anglican Church, and to the community.	
Ronald Joseph Walker	For service to business, the arts and the community, and to raising the profile of Australia internationally with significant benefit for tourism and employment.	

=== Officer (AO) ===
==== General Division ====
Recipient	Citation	Notes
Bill Armstrong	For service to the international community and the provision of overseas aid and development through Australian Volunteers International, and to fostering greater understanding of different cultures and raising awareness of social justice and human rights issues.	
Rowena Margaret Armstrong	For service in the area of legislative practice development in Victoria, and to the community through the Anglican Church as an administrator, legal adviser and contributor to the Church's social welfare policy activities.	
Michael Howell Blakemore	For service to the performing arts as a leading international director of stage and screen.	
Professor William John Caelli	For service to the information technology industry as a leading international figure in the development of data security systems in the commercial, academic and community service sectors.	
Sister Margaret Conway	For sustained service to the youth of the Malol community in Papua New Guinea, particularly through the establishment and provision of educational and rehabilitation programmes following the devastation of the 1998 tsunami.	
Professor David Albert Cooper	For service to medicine as a clinician, researcher and leading contributor in the field of HIV/AIDS research, and to the development of new treatment approaches.	
Timothy Kenneth Cox	For service to the performing arts, particularly through providing outstanding leadership to the Australian Ballet and the Bell Shakespeare Company, and as an advocate for the arts in the establishment of the Australian Major Performing Arts Group.	
Glenda Elizabeth Culley	For service to women and to youth as a leading proponent of the programmes of the United Nations Development Fund for Women, and through the Guiding movement at national and international levels.	
Emeritus Professor Mat Darveniza	For service to electrical engineering, particularly through research on lightning protection of electrical equipment and as Chairman of the Standards Australia committee on lightning protection of structures, and to professional education.	
The Honourable Justice Geoffrey Lance Davies	For service to the judiciary and to the legal profession, particularly in the areas of reform of legal procedure and the history of criminal trial procedure.	
Robert John Day	For service to the housing industry in Australia as a major contributor to policy development and member services issues, to social welfare, particularly through the 'Housing the Homeless' programme, and to the community.	
Jane Diplock	For service to business and commerce, to public administration, particularly in the areas of education and training, and to the community through a range of social justice, health, educational and cultural organisations.	
Anthony Philip Eccles	For service to the jewellery craft, particularly through the development of innovative and ground-breaking techniques, to technical education through the promotion of traineeship programmes in Australia and overseas, and to the community as a supporter of 'at risk' youth by encouraging participation in programmes.	
Victor Fonda	For service to the community, particularly as a leading contributor to the activities of the Jewish National Fund and as a fundraiser for charitable organisations, and to the clothing manufacturing industry.	
Professor Derek Brian Frewin	For service to the advancement of medical education, to research in the field of hypertension, and to the community, particularly in relation to the care of the ageing and of people affected by drug addiction.	
Gary Gray	For service to the Australian Labor Party and to politics through the introduction of modern campaign techniques, fundraising protocols for all political parties, affirmative action guidelines, and by strengthening the Party's organisational and financial structure.	
Jo Gawirrin Gumana	For service to the community as a cultural ambassador and religious leader promoting understanding, sharing and mutual respect, to the reconciliation process, and to the arts as a significant contributor to Australia's indigenous artistic heritage.	
Roy Thomas Hardcastle	For service to the consulting engineering profession, to technical education at the Royal Melbourne Institute of Technology, and to the community through a range of service and church groups.	
Professor Alexander Scott Henderson	For service to medicine in the field of mental health as a leading clinician, researcher and scientist, and to the development of national and international policy in regard to greater awareness, education and improved treatments.	
John Horace Ingham	For service to the poultry industry as a pioneer in research and development and establishment of world best practice standards, to the thoroughbred horseracing industry, and to the community.	
Robert Walter Ingham	For service to the poultry industry as a pioneer in research and development and establishment of world best practice standards, and to the community through support for a broad range of charitable organisations and health care facilities.	
Graham John Kraehe	For service to Australian corporate life as a leader in the development of the manufacturing, financial and wine sectors, the expansion of export markets, the fostering of trade relations, and recognition of industry responsibilities to employees, the natural environment and the community.	
Dr Lindsay Warren Louden	For service to people with disabilities through the design and implementation of a specialised educational curriculum, the development of assistance schemes for teachers, parents and carers, and the establishment of initiatives aimed at promoting continued improvement in policy development and service delivery.	
Amanda Macky	For service to youth through the Guiding movement nationally and internationally, particularly through leadership roles in the establishment of policy and contributions to strategic planning, and as a mentor for member organisations from developing countries.	
Edward James McAlister	For service to conservation and the environment, particularly conservation of the world's endangered species through initiation of and participation in a range of collaborative programmes in the zoo and aquarium community, species management initiatives, education projects and regional conservation awareness campaigns.	
Patrick Joseph McClure	For service to the community through the development of social capital policy initiatives, and in the delivery of programmes addressing social justice, welfare support, health and employment generation issues.	
Garry George McDonald	For service to the community by raising awareness of mental health issues and the effects of anxiety disorders and depression on sufferers and carers, and to the arts as an entertainer.	
Padraic Pearse McGuinness	For service to journalism by encouraging and stimulating wide-ranging debate and exchange of ideas within the community, and by raising awareness of economic, social policy and human rights issues.	
Emeritus Professor Robert Garth Nettheim	For service to the law and to legal education in the fields of constitutional and administrative law, and to the community, particularly as an advocate for civil rights and social justice.	
The Honourable Leslie Trevor Olsson	For service to the judiciary and to the law, particularly through the implementation of administrative advancements within the South Australian court system, to industrial relations, and to the community.	
Emeritus Professor Dennis Charles Pearce	For service to the law as an academic, particularly through seminal work on the topics of statutory interpretation, delegated legislation and administrative law; as a teacher, researcher and university administrator; and as a significant contributor in the areas of public administration, press regulation, parliamentary law and copyright control.	
The Honourable William Page Pidgeon	For service to the judiciary in Western Australia, particularly through the development of guidelines relating to 'vulnerable witnesses' and victim support, and to the community as a contributor to the administration of the Anglican Church in Western Australia.	
Dr Margaret Ruth Redpath	For service to the community in the initiation and establishment of palliative care services in Australia, as an educator in the field of professional practice, and as an advocate for improved services.	
Andrew John Robb	For service to the Liberal Party of Australia, to politics as a contributor to policy debate and development, to effective advocacy for the interests of regional Australia and primary producers, and to the community.	
Professor Doreen Anne Rosenthal	For outstanding service nationally and internationally to understanding of and research into adolescent health, particularly in the fields of sexual health and HIV/AIDS.	
David John Ryan	For service to the business and finance community through providing strong leadership to management, generating value for shareholders and lenders, preserving viable Australian businesses and ensuring career and employment opportunities for Australian workers, and to the community through support for many charitable and social causes.	
John Herman Schaeffer	For service to the building services industry, particularly in the areas of professional standards, and to the community as a major benefactor to a range of arts and cultural organisations.	
Dr Evelyn Ruth Scott	For service to the community through leadership in the area of reconciliation, as an advocate for the empowerment of indigenous women, and as an instrumental figure in the establishment of legal, housing, employment and medical services for indigenous communities.	
Professor Margaret Seares	For service to the arts as a leading administrator and musician, as a significant contributor to and advocate for the development of Australia's cultural identity, to education, and to the community.	
Neville Robert Stevens	For service in the field of public sector administration, particularly overseeing the implementation of reforms in the information technology and telecommunications industries, and to the community through executive membership of a range of cultural and artistic organisations.	
Professor Martin Henry Tattersall	For service to medicine as a leading oncology researcher, clinician and educator, as an advocate for patients' rights, particularly in the areas of informed consent and communication, and as a contributor to the development of palliative care procedures both in Australia and internationally.	
Mark Anthony Taylor	For service to cricket as a player, administrator and mentor, and to the community, particularly through support for organisations involved in fundraising for cancer research.	
Sylvia Jane Walton	For service to education at secondary and tertiary levels, particularly through research into specialised curriculum and training programmes, as an administrator, and as a contributor to the development of education policy in both government and non-government sectors.	
Major Brian Fletcher Watters	For service to the community as a leading contributor to the development of policies and strategies aimed at reducing the impact of illicit drug use, through the establishment of effective treatment centres for people addicted to drugs and alcohol, and in raising the level of public debate on the issue.	
William Henry Yarrow	For service to youth, particularly as an advocate for the development of the technical education sector to ensure that students are provided with opportunities to maximise their educational potential, and to the community through membership of musical and indigenous advancement groups.	

==== Military Division ====
Branch	Recipient	Citation	Notes
Navy	Rear Admiral Brian Lee Adams	For distinguished service to the Australian Defence Force and the Royal Australian Navy as Commandant of the Australian Defence Force Academy and as Deputy Chief of Navy.	
Navy	Vice Admiral Russell Edward Shalders	For distinguished service to the Australian Defence Force and the Royal Australian Navy as Commodore Flotillas, Director General Coastwatch and as Head, Defence Personnel Executive.	
Army	Major General Kenneth James Gillespie	For distinguished service to the Australian Defence Force as the Commander Australian Contingent, Operation SLIPPER in the Middle East between October 2001 and March 2002.	
Air Force	Air Marshal Angus Houston	For distinguished service to the Australian Defence Force and the Royal Australian Air Force in senior command appointments.	

=== Member (AM) ===
==== General Division ====
Recipient	Citation	Notes
Eric Fraser Ainsworth	For service to the community of South Australia, particularly the disability sector, through the SPARC Disability Foundation, and to business through involvement with the energy and biotechnology industries.	
Dr John Aloizos	For service to medicine, particularly medical administration, and to the Australian Divisions of General Practice.	
Randolph Ranjit Alwis	For service to the development of multiculturalism in Australia as an advocate and lobbyist, and to the community through the promotion of indigenous reconciliation.	
Professor Robert George Andry	For service to psychology as a theorist, practitioner and therapist, and through the development of the practice of cross-cultural forensic psychology.	
Michael George Angelakis	For service to the development and promotion of the South Australian seafood, wine, food and tourism industries, and to the community through support for health and social welfare agencies.	
Dr Trevor ApSimon	For service to medicine, particularly for pioneering work in the area of interventional neuroradiology in Australia.	
June Maree Ashmore	For service to people who are blind or vision impaired, as an executive member of a range of blindness-related organisations providing advocacy, support and assistance to members.	
Solvig Baas Becking	For service to arts and crafts, particularly through developmental work in textile art in Australia and with the modern craft movement, and as a teacher and mentor.	
Earle Ian Backen	For service to art as a contributor to the development and understanding of contemporary art, both as an artist and as a lecturer in the tertiary education sector.	
Christopher James Baker	In recognition of service to the community, particularly children, through the initiation and development of the Ronald McDonald House and Clinic in Adelaide, and as a supporter of church, social welfare, youth and community celebration programmes	
Professor Norbert Berend	For service in the field of thoracic medicine in Australia as a clinician, researcher, educator and administrator.	
Frank Richard Bishop	For service to water engineering, to the development of the Australian Water Association, and as a consultant, educator and administrator.	
Lieutenant Colonel Kenneth John Bladen	For service to veterans and their families, particularly through the Western Australian Branch of the Returned and Services League of Australia.	
Margaret Camilla Bolster	For service to conservation and the environment, particularly through the Conservation Council of South Australia and as editor of the magazine Environment SA.	
William Bawden Bott	For service to local government in regional New South Wales, particularly through the Local Government Shires Association, and to the community of Corowa.	
Eileen Kampakuta Brown	For service to the community through the preservation, revival and teaching of traditional Anangu Aboriginal culture and as an advocate for indigenous communities in Central Australia.	
Brother Gerald Burns	For service to youth welfare, particularly through the development of the innovative services and programmes of Marist Youth Care.	
Dr Michael Burr	For service to the development of the Australian olive industry through the fostering of research into the genetics, processing and assessment of olive oil, and as a pioneer in the development of geriatric medicine within Australian teaching hospitals.	
Lana Eleanor Cantrell	For service to the entertainment industry, and for assistance to the Australian community in New York.	
Associate Professor Sandra Maureen Capra	For service to community health, particularly through the advancement and promotion of nutrition and dietetics as an educator and researcher, and to the Guiding movement.	
Professor David Sulman Carment	For service to the community, particularly through the National Trust of Australia, as an advocate for the protection of Northern Territory cultural heritage, and to the scholarship and dissemination of knowledge of Northern Territory history.	
Mary Adelaide Carroll	For service to community health, particularly through the Western Australian Health Promotion Foundation (Healthway) and the National Heart Foundation of Australia.	
Frederick John Casson	For service to the community, particularly people living with mental illness, through the establishment, provision and promotion of a range of mental health services in Western Australia.	
Dr Bruce Richard Champ	For service to agricultural research and entomology, particularly through the development of stored grain insect control.	
Councillor James Douglas Chapman	For service to local government, and to the community of the Atherton Tablelands and far north Queensland, particularly through the promotion of economic development in the region.	
Antony Erling Charlton	For service to the community through the organisation and promotion of fundraising events to support a range of health, research, rehabilitation and veteran groups in Australia.	
Alan Wilson Clark	For service to the community of the Shoalhaven district as a member and administrator of historical, social welfare and sporting organisations, and to the researching and publishing of local history.	
Dr Bryan George Coombe	For service to the development of the Australian grape and wine industry, particularly as an educator and as a pioneer of physiological and developmental research on grape berries.	
Barbara Markell Cooper	For service to pedigree dog breeding through the Working Kelpie Council of Australia and its promotion of the registration of dogs and encouragement of breeding with recognised working animals to ensure purity of the line.	
Judith Ann Cottier	For service to education as the Principal of Perth College, and through fostering educational opportunities for young women in both academic and co-curricular areas.	
John Thomas Cowley	For service to the community, particularly people who are visually impaired, and to the print media industry.	
Frederick Harold Cress	For service to the visual arts in Australia as an artist and teacher, and to the community through support for cultural and medical research organisations.	
David Graeme Croft	For service to electrical engineering, particularly the electricity supply industry, and to the community through the activities of Rotary International.	
Ann Mary Cullity	For service to the community of Western Australia through organisations involved with education, the arts, health care and scientific research, and as a fundraiser for charitable groups.	
Kevin William Davis	For service to the community, to the arts, and to education, particularly the development of educational opportunities for Aboriginal children.	
The Most Reverend Dr Hilton Forrest Deakin	For service to the international community, particularly through the Catholic aid agency, Caritas Australia, and to the people of East Timor.	
Dr Michael James Dodson	For service to the indigenous community, particularly in raising awareness of social justice issues, as a contributor to advancing the reconciliation process, and as a campaigner for native title rights.	
Emeritus Professor Peter Joseph Drake	For service to education, especially through leadership of the Australian Catholic University, to the study of economics, and to overseas aid delivery.	
Roger du Blet	For service to the housing industry, to small business development, and to transport infrastructure in Queensland.	
Terrence John Edwards	For service to the community through Rotary International, particularly as a volunteer for the Australian Rotary Health Research Fund.	
Associate Professor Peter John Fenner	For service to medicine through marine toxinology research and management, to surf lifesaving in Queensland, and to the community.	
Denis William Fitzgerald	For service to Rugby League football as a player and administrator, and to the community of Parramatta.	
John Flannagan	For service to the community through the development and expansion of the services provided by Foodbank Australia.	
Anthony Fowke	For service as an advocate for the advancement of mental health services in Australia, and to the community.	
Charles Hugh Francis	For service to the law, particularly as a contributor to the process of legal and administrative reform, and to the community by facilitating public access to the legal system.	
Professor Kevin John Gaskin	For service to medicine in the field of paediatric gastrointestinal disease, particularly with the gut, liver and nutritional complications of cystic fibrosis.	
Sylvia Gelman MBE	For service to the community, particularly through a range of organisations concerned with issues affecting women	
Luigi Alexander Giglia	For service to the Western Australian dairy industry through a range of industry organisations and by contributing to the establishment of the Herd Improvement Scheme, and to the community.	
Diane Ethersey Griffin	For service to the community, particularly people with dementia and their carers, and as an advocate for and contributor to the establishment and development of a number of organisations, including the Alzheimer's Association NSW.	
Richard Winston Gulley	For service to the law and to the legal profession, particularly through the Law Society of New South Wales and the Legal Aid Commission of New South Wales.	
Lindsay Charles Hamilton	For service to the development and promotion of bilateral relations between Australia and Taiwan, particularly through the Australia-Taiwan Business Council.	
Jeffrey Stewart Heath	For service to people with disabilities as an advocate for improved services and through the publication of Link magazine.	
Dr Robert Hecker	For service to the community through a range of service, cultural, social welfare and sporting organisations, and to medicine, particularly in the field of gastroenterology.	
Richard John Hein	For service to the transport industry, particularly through the Australian and international shipping sectors and the development of port facilities.	
Phyllis Merle Henning	For service to the rural sector in Western Australia, particularly through the West Australian Learning Centre Movement, and to the community of Koorda.	
Dr Christopher Charles Heyde	For service to mathematics, particularly through research into statistics and probability, and to the advancement of learning in these disciplines.	
Dr William Edwin Hillis	For service to the development of wood science and forest products technology, and to the sustainable use of forest resources.	
Terence Noel Hogan	For service to the rice industry, particularly through the Ricegrowers' Co-operative Limited, and to the community of Jerilderie through service in a range of local government roles.	
Peter Wentworth Hughes	For service to engineering and water management in Australia.	
Professor Torstein John Hundloe	For service to environmental protection, particularly in the areas of fisheries and coastal management, ecotourism, protected area management and environmental economics.	
Emeritus Professor John McLeod Hunn	For service to medicine, particularly in developing the burns treatment unit at the Royal Hobart Hospital, to medical education, and to the community.	
Emeritus Professor Charles Angas Hurst	For service to science, particularly in the field of mathematical physics as an educator, researcher and administrator.	
Bella Irlicht	For service to education, particularly to children with special needs, and to the community.	
Jennifer Carmel Isaacs	For service to creating awareness of the significance of Aboriginal culture, and as a promoter of emerging indigenous talent in all areas of the arts.	
Percy Harold Iszlaub	For service to local government and to the community of the South Burnett district, particularly the development of regional tourism, information technology access and infrastructure.	
Dr Christine Russell Jenkins	For service to respiratory medicine as a physician, administrator and educator, particularly in the field of asthma education.	
Keith Arthur Johnson	For service to genealogy as an author and publisher of Australian family history, and through the Society of Australian Genealogists and the Royal Australian Historical Society.	
Mary Patricia Kaufmann	For service to people with disabilities, particularly through Minda Special School and the Intellectual Disability Services Council.	
Max Kay	For service to the entertainment industry through the establishment of the Civic Theatre Restaurant and the development of young performers, and to the community as a fundraiser for charitable organisations.	
Franz Moishe Kempf	For service to the arts, particularly printmaking, and to art organisations.	
Maureen Hyne Kingston	For service to the welfare of the ageing through the Association of Independent Retirees as an adviser and representative.	
John Christopher Kirby	For service to the community of Canberra through a range of business and community organisations, including the Australian National Maritime Museum and the Canberra Association of Regional Development.	
Associate Professor Ainslie Florence Lamb	For service to the legal profession, particularly as an educator in the area of cross-cultural and indigenous issues, and to the community, particularly in education.	
Emeritus Professor James Sutherland Lawson	For service to medical administration and to the community, particularly through programmes aimed at health improvement.	
Patricia Marie Le Lievre	For service to the community of western New South Wales, particularly through local government, regional development, and isolated rural family organisations.	
Dr Wellington Lee	For service to local government through the City of Melbourne, and to the community, particularly through Landcare Foundation Victoria and the State Library of Victoria Foundation.	
Jane Louise Lennon	For service to conservation, the environment and heritage issues, particularly as an administrator, consultant and executive member of a range of government committees and organisations.	
Josephine Lonergan	For service to education and to the community, particularly through the Australian Parents' Council and a range of educational organisations.	
Sam Lovell	For service as a mentor to indigenous groups and communities in the Kimberley region in developing tourism ventures.	
Iris Christina Lovett-Gardiner	For service to the indigenous community as founder of the Aboriginal Community Elders Service Hostel in Melbourne, and through translating and documenting the generational stories and history of the Kerrup-J-Marra clan from the Lake Condah Mission.	
Graeme William Lyall	For service to music as Artistic Director of the Western Australian Youth Jazz Orchestra, and as a musical director, composer and performer.	
Roderick Ian Macqueen	For service to sport, particularly Rugby Union football as coach of the Australian Wallabies.	
David Mandie	For service to the community of Melbourne, particularly as a benefactor to a broad range of medical, arts and sporting organisations, and as an executive member of several committees and associations promoting commerce, tourism and international trade.	
Hella McAdam	For service to the Children's Cancer Institute Australia, and for the development of a corporate sponsorship programme.	
John William McAdam	For service to the Children's Cancer Institute Australia through fundraising for research into the causes and treatments of childhood cancer.	
Stuart Richard McDonald	For service to agribusiness and rural communities in Victoria through the Rural Finance Corporation and the Young Farmer Finance Council, and to the Parliament of Victoria.	
John Noel McKnoulty	For service to the administration of sport, particularly cricket, to the administration of a range of government regulatory authorities, and to the community, particularly through organisations associated with the Catholic Church.	
Donald Ross McWilliam	For service to the wine industry and through leadership of a range of industry organisations.	
Patrick Winston Medway	For service to conservation and the environment through environmental education and a range of organisations and committees concerned with the preservation of wildlife and nature, particularly the Wildlife Preservation Society of Australia.	
Ian Fraser Meikle	For service to the print media and related press organisations, and to the community through a range of welfare and arts organisations.	
Robert Frederick Merriman	For service to cricket, particularly as an administrator with the Australian Cricket Board, the Victorian Cricket Association and the Victorian Country Cricket League.	
Dr Merrilyn Leila Murnane	For service to paediatrics, particularly in the areas of care and protection of abused children and youth.	
James Francis Murphy	For service to the community and business sectors of the Australian Capital Territory through a range of private and government committees and associations, and to the wine industry, particularly through marketing and promotion.	
Dr Paul Nisselle	For service to medicine and the medical profession through contributions to a range of government and professional organisations, and to the community through youth welfare and cultural groups.	
Michael James O'Connor	For service to the community through raising public awareness of defence, security and strategic issues.	
Lady Marjorie Pagan	For service to the community, particularly through the restoration of heritage items and promoting the activities of the Association of Australian Decorative and Fine Arts Societies, and as a fundraiser for charitable organisations.	
Diana Elizabeth Penniment	For service to local government, and to the advancement of rural community issues through Women in Agriculture and Business and a range of local organisations.	
Associate Professor David Claude Plummer	For service to community health as a contributor to the development of policy, sexual health education programmes and clinical services to combat HIV/AIDS and sexually transmitted diseases.	
Mary Edith Porter	For service to the community, particularly through Volunteering Australia and a broad range of welfare organisations in the Australian Capital Territory.	
Dr Eva Raik	For service to medicine as a pathologist, and to the Australian health system through membership of a broad range of government and professional associations and committees.	
Yvonne Rae Rate	For service to sport, particularly netball, as an administrator with a range of committees and councils, and as a coach and player.	
Paul John Robertson	For service to children's health and welfare through the establishment and administration of the Financial Markets Foundation for Children, and to the community through church and educational organisations.	
Dr John Brian Robinson	For service to environmental protection, particularly through the development of appropriate legislation and fostering partnerships between government, industry and the community to improve the physical environment.	
Dr Maxwell James Robinson	For service to medicine through the practice and teaching of paediatrics.	
Professor Alan David Robson	For service to education, particularly in the field of agricultural science, and to the development of agricultural research through a range of research committees and councils.	
Dr Bruce Frederick Rounsefell	For service to medicine as a pioneer, researcher and educator in multi-disciplinary pain management.	
Emeritus Professor Peter Desmond Rousch	For service to the higher education sector, to support for greater access to tertiary education for Aboriginal students, to the arts, and to the community.	
Lieutenant Colonel Derek John Roylance	For service to veterans and their families as an executive member of the Returned and Services League of Australia, and as a contributor to the administration of the League in Papua New Guinea.	
Professor Pamela Joan Russell	For service to medical research in the field of oncology, particularly in improving detection methods and in developing preventive approaches for prostate cancer.	
Malcolm Rex Sainty	For service to genealogy as an author and publisher of Australian family history, and through the Society of Australian Genealogists and the Australasian Federation of Family History Organisations.	
Geraldine Jane Scarlett	For service to young people through the Guiding movement, particularly in the areas of training and welfare, and to the community through the work of the Salvation Army.	
Anne Schofield	For service to the performing arts as an administrator and fundraiser for the Sydney Theatre Company, and to the applied and decorative arts, particularly antiques, as an author and consultant.	
Basil Alfred Sellers	For service to the community as a philanthropist through donations to a number of charitable and community organisations, to sports development, and to business.	
Jan Feliks Senbergs	For service to the Australian visual arts as a painter whose work has been exhibited in, and forms part of, national and international galleries and collections.	
Associate Professor John Ambler Snowdon	For service to the mental health of the ageing, particularly through psychiatric research and rehabilitation, and as an executive and consultant on a range of government and professional organisations.	
Dr Daniel Stiel	For service to the Sydney 2000 Olympic and Paralympic Games as the Chief Medical Officer and through efforts to ensure a 'drug-free' Games, and to medicine, particularly in the field of gastroenterology.	
Elisabeth Faye Stokes	For service to young people through the Girls' Brigade Australia, and to the community of Greenwood.	
The Honourable Kathy Sullivan	For service to the Parliament of Australia and to the community, particularly as an advocate for improved services and conditions affecting women.	
Dr Percy Edwin Sykes	For service to veterinary science, particularly equine health, and to the thoroughbred horse racing industry.	
Ronald Josiah Taylor	For service to conservation and the environment through marine cinematography and photography, by raising awareness of endangered and potentially extinct marine species, and by contributing to the declaration of species and habitat protection.	
William Ronald Utteridge	For service to the community through Relationships Australia and through a wide range of welfare, social service and conservation organisations.	
Kenneth Dennison von Bibra	For service to the community of northern Tasmania through contributions in the areas of local government, agribusiness, the arts and the preservation of heritage and historical sites.	
Catherine Mary Walter	For service to business, particularly as a director of a range of public companies, to the arts, to the law, and to the community through the Melbourne City Council.	
Richard Dennis Walter	For service to the community, particularly as a health administrator and as an executive member of a range of educational and regional development organisations, and to local government.	
Phoebe Florence Wanganeen	For service to the indigenous community of South Australia, particularly through the provision of advice and as a contributor to the development of educational programmes, and through the activities of a range of social welfare and support groups.	
Peter John Wertheim	For service to the community as an executive member of a range of peak Jewish organisations, and through projects aimed at promoting greater community understanding.	
Shirley Joan White	For service to people with asbestos-related disease, particularly through the establishment of the Queensland Asbestos Related Disease Support Society.	
Dr Stephen Wilkinson	For service to medicine as a surgeon, researcher, administrator and teacher, and to the community as a promoter of a healthy lifestyle for children.	
Courtney John Williams	For service to the Australian mining and metallurgical industries, particularly as a leader in the development of suspension smelting of non-ferrous metals.	
Professor Ian Philip Williamson	For service to the surveying profession, particularly through the design, operation and management of cadastral and land information systems, and to the community as a member of a range of educational councils.	
Colonel Rodney Mervyn Willox	For service to local government at state, regional and local levels, to the environment as an executive member of waste and water management authorities, and to the community through health, welfare, emergency service and veterans' associations.	
Margaret Ann Wood	For service to the community, particularly through participation in a range of organisations concerned with raising awareness of and dealing with alcohol and drug abuse, and providing educational and employment opportunities for 'at risk' young people.	

==== Military Division ====
Branch	Recipient	Citation	Notes
Navy	Captain Nigel Stephen Coates	For exceptional service to the Australian Defence Force and the Royal Australian Navy, particularly as Commanding Officer HMAS ANZAC during deployment on Operation SLIPPER and in support of Operation ENDURING FREEDOM.	
Navy	Captain Jennifer Anne Priestley Graham, CSM	For exceptional service to the Australian Defence Force and the Royal Australian Navy in the field of military officer training.	
Army	Lieutenant Colonel Angus John Campbell	For exceptional service to the Australian Defence Force as the Commanding Officer of the 2nd Battalion Group during operational service in East Timor.	
Army	Colonel David Hugh Chalmers	For exceptional service to the Australian Defence Force as the Commander Australian Contingent on Operation TANAGER in East Timor.	
Army	Brigadier Anthony Peter Fraser, CSC	For exceptional service to the Australian Army as Commanding Officer 5th Aviation Regiment and as Commander Divisional Aviation	
Army	Lieutenant Colonel Dianne Maree Gallasch	For exceptional service to the Australian Defence Force as Deputy Commander Force Logistics Support Group and as the Commanding Officer/Chief Instructor of the Personnel Support Division, Army Logistics Training Centre.	
Army	Colonel Robert Lawrence Moffatt	For exceptional service to the Australian Defence Force and the Australian Army in the field of operational and strategic communications.	
Air Force	Squadron Leader Sean Patrick Bellenger	For exceptional service to the Royal Australian Air Force in the fields of flying instruction and display flying.	
Air Force	Wing Commander David John Willcox	For exceptional service to the Australian Defence Force in the fields of fighter operations, capability development and training.	

=== Medal (OAM) ===
==== General Division ====
Recipient	Citation	Notes
Helen Florence Abigail	For service to the community of Wagga Wagga through the provision of care for the ageing and for people with disabilities.	
George Henry Ackaoui	For service to the community of Wollongong.	
Pamela Adams	For service to the community, particularly through Vision Australia Foundation's Radio for the Print Handicapped and the Anti Cancer Council of Victoria.	
James Andrew Aitken	For service to the community, particularly through St Peter's Anglican Church Wynnum Community Service Committee.	
Iris Aldridge	For service to the community of Bendemere Shire.	
Shirley Anne Allen	For service to podiatry, particularly the development of treatment of foot disorders in people with diabetes.	
Joyce Elizabeth Alley	For service to children with cleft lip and palate as a speech pathologist.	
Joyce Maria Allie	For service to the community through the establishment of the organisation Reaching Out to People in Emotional Stress.	
Robert Henry Appleton	For service to the community of Geelong.	
Anthony Joseph Armarego	For service to the community of Cockburn City.	
Esma Armstrong	For service to the environment, particularly in the areas of land and water quality management, and to the community.	
Eric Stanley Arnold	For service to the community of Lithgow, particularly through Little Athletics.	
Valda Louise Arrowsmith	For service to the community of Nunawading, and to local government.	
David William Atkinson	For service to the community of Warrnambool, particularly through local government.	
Dr John Nicolson Aubrey	For service to veterinary science, and to the community of Townsville.	
Edward Lloyd Badke	For service to the communities of Coolangatta and Burleigh Heads, particularly through support for the local ambulance committee.	
Tom Lawrence Baillieu	For service to the community of Coolah.	
Geoffrey Roddick Baker	For service to the community of Tarcutta.	
Jack Baldwin	For service to the communities of the Hunter and Lake Macquarie districts through a range of service, aged care groups and the Scouting movement.	
Vincenzo Gaetano Balestra	For service to the Italian community of Fitzroy and surrounding suburbs.	
Graeme Stanley Banks	For service to export meat and affiliated industries, and to the study and cultivation of orchids.	
Dr Trevor Albert Banks	For service to medicine, and to the community, particularly in the field of palliative care.	
Thomas Colin Bannister	For service to the community, particularly through the Royal Humane Society of Australasia.	
Gwenyth Joy Barbary	For service to the community of Woomelang, particularly through the Bush Nursing Centre and establishment of accommodation for the ageing.	
Merle Barrett	For service to the community of Orange.	
Lennox Vernon Bastian	For service to speleology in Western Australia as an explorer and surveyor, and to the protection of caves.	
Henry Bayliss	For service to the community of Coonabarabran, particularly through the Junior Golf Association.	
Jean Lois Bayliss	For service to the community of Coonabarabran, particularly through the Junior Golf Association.	
Arthur Harold Beale	For service to people with disabilities as an advocate and through involvement in a range of support groups.	
Mary Elizabeth Beck	For service to the community of Rushworth.	
John James Bedford	For service to the community of Bankstown.	
Pamela Bell	For service to the visual arts as curator and as a contributor to the advancement of culture and scholarship.	
Jack Bennett	For service to sport, particularly through the administration and development of cricket and Australian Rules football in Tasmania, and to youth through Studentworks.	
John Herbert Berry	For service to the community, particularly through St John Ambulance Australia, South Australia.	
The Reverend Barry Johnson Bevis	For service to the community of the Hornsby area through the Anglican Church.	
Professor David Biles	For service in the field of criminology as an educator, researcher and adviser.	
Robert Graeme Blake	For service to people with disabilities through Rowing Australia's adaptive rowing programme, DISROW.	
Kathleen Mary Bleechmore	For service to people with intellectual disabilities through the provision of accommodation, employment and day programmes.	
Olga Muriel Blundell-Wignall	For service to the community of Mundaring.	
John Ronald Books	For service to the community, particularly through retiree associations and as a heritage boat and yacht restorer.	
Ronald Bradley	For service to surf lifesaving as a competitor, official and administrator, and by promoting junior participation.	
Dr Gerald Humphrey Brameld	For service to the community, particularly through the Royal Life Saving Society.	
Arthur Albert Bridges	For service to the community of Esperance through rural, sporting and service organisations.	
Judith Anne Brigden	For service to the community of Ku-ring-gai, particularly the welfare of the ageing.	
Iris Doreen Bristow	For service to the community of Narembeen.	
Julie Diane Britton	For service to the community, particularly as a foster parent for children with severe intellectual disabilities.	
Raymond Brooks	For service to the community of the Shoalhaven Shire.	
Colleen Brown	For service to the indigenous community through the family therapy movement and as a counsellor.	
Betty Joy Bruce	For service to the community as a youth leader and fundraiser for Try Youth and Community Services Inc.	
Gordon Charles Bryant	For service to the community of Coolah.	
Lucinda Jane Bryant	For service to people with disabilities as the artistic director of Merry Makers Australia.	
Millicent Grace Bryant	For service to sport, particularly as a volunteer swimming, life saving, and water polo instructor and trainer.	
Joseph Anthony Buda	For service to the community, particularly the Italian community of Cabramatta.	
Major Cyril Victor Bunny	For service to the community through the Rostrum Clubs of New South Wales.	
Ormonde Roger Butler	For service to the community of Moree and district through health, youth and church organisations.	
Susan Jane Caracoussis	For service to the community through the promotion of activities celebrating the Australian nation, and to the development of the public relations profession.	
Kathleen Constance Carins	For service to education, particularly through the Tasmanian Home Education Advisory Council.	
Victor Richard Carle	For service to the welfare of veterans and their families.	
Anne Marie Carroll	For service to the community, particularly through Friends of Ku-ring-gai Environment.	
Kathryn Janet Carstens	For service to the ageing, particularly through the Community Care Centre Annerley, and to the community.	
Phillip Leonard Carter	For service to the community of Quirindi, and to the Royal Agricultural Society of New South Wales.	
Monica Carter	For service to the community of Naracoorte.	
The Reverend Father Lester Gerald Cashen	For service to the Catholic Church, particularly in the area of education and in the administration of St John's College at the University of Sydney.	
Frederick George Cassidy	For service to the community, particularly through the No 30 Squadron Beaufighter Association.	
Dorothy Chamberlain	For service to the community, particularly through the Central Coast Family History Society Inc.	
Dr Jeremy Robert Chapman	For service to the community through the establishment of the Australian Bone Marrow Donor Registry.	
Robert William Chittenden	For service to the community, particularly through the Canberra Police and Citizens Youth Club.	
Jan Maree Chivers	For service to the community of Cowra.	
Desmond James Christiansen	For service to music as a performer, director and chorus master.	
Robert William Christie	For service to veterans and their families, particularly through the 2/29 Battalion AIF Association.	
Peter Cinque	For service to the community through the New South Wales State Emergency Service.	
Eric Bruce Ciracovitch	For service to veterans and their families, and to the community, particularly through the West Lakes Rotary Club.	
Sister Catherine Ellen Clark	For service to Catholic education in South Australia.	
Dr Joan Ellen Clarke	For service to social welfare research, and to the development of community support services and training for health workers, particularly through the Prahran Mission.	
Dr Priscilla Murray Clarke	For service to education through the establishment of bilingual education programmes for preschool children of migrant and refugee families.	
Stevie Clayton	For service to the community, particularly through contributions to the process of gay and lesbian law reform, in the field of anti-discrimination and in the areas of safety, welfare and health including HIV/AIDS.	
Dilwyn David Cleak	For service to the community, particularly through the Albany Sub-Branch of the Returned and Services League of Australia.	
Dympna Coleman	For service to the community of Kew, particularly through the restoration of local bushland.	
Dr Anthony Francis Collings	For service to the management and administration of university sport.	
Errol Keith Collins	For service to the community of Newcastle through music.	
Associate Professor Valerie Collins-Varga	For service to opera as a performer, teacher and administrator.	
Geoffrey Ronald Collinson	For service to the community of the Bungendore district through local government and sporting, ex-Service and rural fire service organisations.	
Bobby Connelly	For service to the community of Oakey.	
John Lawrence Cook	For service to the community of Benambra.	
Vilma May Cook	For service to the community of Nambucca Valley.	
Warren Francis Cook	For service to the community, particularly the welfare of children 'at risk' as a Children's Magistrate, and through the Scouting movement.	
Guy Copley	For service to the community through educational, service and family support organisations.	
Nora Eileen Corcoran	For service to the community of Barellan.	
Robin Corfield	For service to the community through the preservation of Australia's military history in association with the Friends of the 15th Brigade.	
John Robert Corkill	For service to forest conservation, particularly in north eastern New South Wales.	
William Dudley Cornell	For service to the community of Horsham.	
Margaret Christine Cossins	For service to the community, particularly through the establishment of the Cairns Regional Gallery.	
Alva Kelway Courtis	For service to the community of Esperance, particularly through the provision of health and social welfare services.	
Roxena Cowie	For service to the community of Fingal Valley, particularly through St John Ambulance.	
Anna Stirling Cox	For service to the community, particularly through the Adelaide Botanic Gardens.	
Irene Mary Cracknell	For service to the community through health, social welfare and emergency services groups.	
Colleen Lynda Crane	For service to the community of Norfolk Island.	
Donald McMillan Crawford	For service to the community of Armidale through aged care, sporting, social welfare and service groups.	
Dr Anthony Charles Cree	For service to the community, particularly through the Victoria Day Council and the Federation of Australian State and Territory Day Associations.	
Noel Bruce Crellin	For service to the community, particularly people with disabilities.	
The Reverend Ronald Charles Cross	For service to chaplaincy, particularly through the development and introduction of National Health Care Chaplaincy Standards, and to the community.	
Walter David Crosswell	For service to the community of the Sorell Shire through a range of welfare, service and historical organisations.	
Graham Bernard Cummins	For service to the community through sports administration, development and coaching.	
Yvonne Lorraine Cuschieri	For service to the community, particularly to children with cancer and their families.	
Peter Kaiss Dahdah	For service to the community of Taree.	
Russell Thomas Davidson	For service to the stud merino and wool industries.	
Phillip Harris Davis	For service to education, particularly through Newington College, and to the community.	
John Norman Daye	For service to the community as an advocate for people with HIV/AIDS, particularly in the provision of support and treatment services.	
Dr Malcolm Fletcher Deall	For service to the people of Nepal through the provision of voluntary dental care and training.	
Robert Laurie Dewar	For service to the honey bee industry as an advocate for the establishment of a peak industry body, quality assurance programmes, and disease and pest control.	
Armando Di Sipio	For service to the Italian community of Moonee Ponds and surrounding suburbs.	
Pauline Lorna Dickson	For service to the community of Bungonia.	
Terence Dillon	For service to vocational training through the Work Skill Australia Foundation.	
Lawrence Dimech	For service to the Maltese community within New South Wales.	
Dennis Paul Donohue	For service to the community of Charleville.	
Sister Marie Therese Doolan	For service to people with burns and lymphoedema through designing and tailoring compression garments.	
Loraina Lilian Dorham	For service to the community, particularly the ageing and veterans.	
James Thomas Dorman	For service to the community, particularly through the Lord Howe Island Museum and Historical Society.	
Raymond Leslie Douglas	For service to the community of Poowong.	
Peter Henry Doyle	For service to the restaurant and catering industries, to the development of tourism, and to the community, particularly people with disabilities.	
Emil Herman Draeger	For service to business and commerce through the Committee for Economic Development of Australia.	
William Bird Dreverman	For service to the community of East Gippsland.	
Joyce Duncan	For service to the community as a volunteer and fundraiser for the Balmain Hospital Auxiliary, the Children's Hospitals at Camperdown and Westmead, and Bear Cottage, Manly.	
James William Dwyer	For service to the law, particularly through the provision of legal advice relating to intellectual property and trademarks, and to the community as a fundraiser for charitable organisations.	
Anne Ruth Dybka	For service to the arts as a glass engraver.	
Elizabeth Anne Dyer	For service to the community of Margaret River.	
Dr Andrew Maclean Ellis	For service to medicine as an orthopaedic surgeon.	
Evangelia Angela Erturk	For service to arts and crafts as a master ceremonial embroiderer.	
Anastasia Sheila Evans	For service to the community through the development of support services for women, as an advocate for women prisoners and by raising awareness of social justice issues.	
The Honourable Dr Andrew Lee Evans	For service to the community through the promotion of Christian values and the development of support and social welfare services for families and young people.	
Geoffrey Thomas Evans	For service to the community of Echuca.	
Dr Robert Housley Farnsworth	For service to medicine, particularly as a paediatric urologist.	
Enid Laurel Farrow	For service to the community, particularly through The Crowle Foundation.	
Jennifer Anne Filmer	For service to the community of Tharwa, particularly through the rural bush fire service.	
Kevin Bruce Finch	For service to the community of Bankstown, particularly through the development of junior soccer.	
Eva Fischl	For service to the community, particularly through JewishCare.	
The Honourable Diana Beresford Fisher	For service to the community through a range of charitable organisations, and to the broadcast media.	
Dr Robin Gerard Fisher	For service to the community of Tamworth as a general practitioner.	
Christine Lesly Fitzpatrick	For service to the community of Bridgewater/Gagebrook.	
Martin Fitzpatrick	For service to youth through the Scouting movement.	
Ronald Edward Fluck	For service to railway heritage conservation through the National Railway Museum.	
Beryl Vera Fookes	For service to people with intellectual disabilities through Bayley House.	
Robert Fothergill	For service to the community through organisations providing assistance for the ageing, young people and veterans, and their families.	
Charles Missen Fraser	For service to the community of Warwick, and to the livestock transport industry.	
Keith Weedon Free	For service to the horseracing industry, and to the community.	
Audrey Jillian Fullagar	For service to sport, particularly through netball administration.	
Margaret Elaine Gallagher	For service to the community, particularly women and children in the Manly Warringah district of Sydney through support for Pregnancy Help.	
Patricia Evelyn Gallaher	For service to the arts and to the community, particularly as a regional librarian.	
David Eliot Gamson	For service to the community, particularly through the Barker College Council and the Combined Associated Schools Committee.	
Richard Alan Gilford	For service to the community of the Hunter Valley Region, particularly through the Hunter Plant Operating Training School and the programmes of Rotary International.	
Dr William Elliott Gillies	For service to ophthalmology, particularly through the study of glaucoma and strabismus.	
Leslie Graham Gillies	For service to the community of Bendigo.	
Dr Jane Philippa Gilmour	For service to conservation and the environment through the Earthwatch Institute (Australia).	
Gerry Helne Gimblett	For service to education, particularly to students in rural and regional areas.	
Robert Anthony Glenister	For service to children with cancer, particularly through founding Kayaking for Kemo Kids and fundraising for childhood cancer research.	
Reginald Edwin Golding	For service to people with disabilities through the Riding for the Disabled Association in Orange.	
Cornelis Goosens	For service to the community of Uraidla.	
Francis Robert Gorrel	For service to the community of the Sutherland Shire, particularly through the work of the Aboriginal Children's Advancement Society.	
The Reverend George William Grant	For service to the community, particularly through promoting inter-faith harmony.	
Brigadier William Grant	For service to veterans, particularly through the Royal United Services Institute.	
Freda Jean Gray	For service to the community through the Hobart Town (1804) First Settlers Association.	
Donald Thomas Gray	For service to surf lifesaving, particularly at club level and as an examiner and competition official.	
Geoffrey Selwyn Green	For service to the Jewish community, particularly through social welfare and relief organisations.	
Neil Kelso Greenwood	For service to the sugar industry, and to the community of Proserpine.	
John William Griffin	For service to the community of Castlemaine, particularly through the Mount Alexander Hospital.	
Susan Elizabeth Griffin	For service to the community as a foster carer for children.	
Thelma Shirley Grinyer	For service to veterans and their families through the Narrabeen RSL Veterans' Retirement Villages.	
Ronald Marcus Grocke	For service to music through the Tanunda Liedertafel, and to the community of the Barossa Valley.	
Edwin Haberfield	For service to country music as a songwriter and performer.	
George Haddock	For service to conservation and the environment, particularly through the National Parks Association of Queensland.	
June Lawrence Hadley	For service to the community through the activities of VIEW Clubs of Australia.	
Margaret Norma Hale	For service to the community of Rockhampton, particularly through the Guiding and Scouting movements.	
Rita Pauline Hall	For service to the community, particularly through the Kerang and District Hospital Ladies' Auxiliary.	
Peter Glenn Hammat	For service to the communities of the Northern Areas region of South Australia, particularly through the administration of health services.	
John Henry Hansford	For service to people with physical disabilities through the construction and adaptation of mobilising aids and equipment.	
Kevin Clarke Harris	For service to the community of Claremont.	
Stanley Uther Harris	For service to veterans and their families through the Wauchope Sub-Branch of the Returned and Services League of Australia, and to the community of the Hastings region.	
Kay Elizabeth Hatherly	For service to radiotherapy, particularly in the field of electronic portal imaging.	
Albert Elvin Hayter	For service to the community of Ballina.	
Edna Joyce Hayter	For service to the community of Ballina.	
John Clyde Headon	For service to the community of Hay.	
Terence Thomas Healey	For service to the ageing and to veterans and their families through the administration and management of healthcare facilities.	
Emeritus Professor Trevor James Heath	For service to the veterinary profession, particularly as an educator, mentor and administrator.	
Charlie John Hedges	For service to the community of Yass, particularly to veterans and their families.	
June Marion Heinrich	For service to the community and the ageing, particularly through the Baptist Community Services of New South Wales and the Australian Capital Territory.	
Norman Harold Henderson	For service to the community, particularly to children with disabilities through the Sunnyfield Association.	
Helen Veronica Hendrey	For service to the community of the Mornington Peninsula.	
Edward Ian Henry	For service to the community, to the ageing, and to education as a teacher of mathematics.	
Stanley Walter Henwood	For service to the community of Tynong.	
Isobel Hermann	For service to the community of South West Rocks.	
Barbara Robina Hickman	For service to the community of Bundaberg, particularly through Meals on Wheels.	
Michael Macmeikan Hill	For service to local government, and to the environment through the promotion of recycling and the use of sustainable energy.	
Judith Kay Hindle	For service to conservation and the environment, particularly in the Hobsons Bay region.	
Peter Austin Hobbs	For service to youth at risk through the development and implementation of the organisation Streetwork.	
Ann Louise Hogan	For service to the care of native wildlife in the Hunter region.	
Suzanne Winifred Hogan	For service to the community through music, and to physics education.	
Mary Veronica Holmes	For service to the ageing community of North Plympton through Southern Cross Care.	
Arthur Philip Holt	For service to the community, particularly through a range of services for youth with disabilities and the ageing.	
Everard Gladstone Hooper	For service to the community of Dunedoo.	
Janice Kay Hooper	For service to nursing in South Australia.	
Bruce James Howden	For service to education, particularly as an administrator.	
Gordon Noel Huish	For service to the community, particularly through the Queensland Branch of the Vietnam Veterans' Association of Australia.	
Robert Douglas Humphris	For service to the mining industry, particularly the coal industry.	
Dr Raymond Stanley Hyslop	For service to medicine in the field of obstetrics and gynaecology, particularly as an administrator and educator.	
Robert Charles Irving	For service to the documentation of the architectural history of Australia.	
Margaret Joanne Jackson	For service to the communities of Mortlake and Darlington.	
Gwyneth Jaeger	For service to the community of Gunnedah.	
Councillor Oliver Martin Jane	For service to local government, and to the rural community of Kerang.	
Michael Paul Jarrett	For service to the community as an advocate for people with disabilities.	
Lance Paul Jensen	For service to the community through fundraising for a range of charitable organisations.	
Eva Joel	For service to the Jewish community through a range of women's interest, social welfare and charitable organisations.	
Leslie Charles Johnston	For service to the community, particularly through Rotary International.	
Margaret Mary Johnstone	For service to the community, particularly through the Victorian Highland Pipe Band Association.	
Dr Stephen John Judd	For service to medicine, particularly in the field of endocrinology.	
Ernest George Keegan	For service to the community of the Hunter Region through a range of business, political, service and sporting organisations.	
Noal William Keen	For service to cricket as a player, umpire and administrator.	
Gladys Vera Kelly	For service to the community of South Arm.	
Dr Justin Henry Kelly	For service to medicine as a paediatric surgeon.	
Tunnies Kemper	For service to the community of Wollongong, particularly through Rotary International.	
The Reverend Father Gavan Edward Kennare	For service to the community as a parish priest and as an army chaplain.	
Margery Lilian Kennett	For service to public health in laboratory biosafety and polio eradication.	
Grant Victor Keynes	For service to youth in South Australia through the establishment and operation of the Errappa Blue Light Youth Camp.	
The Reverend Khachig Khachigian	For service to the community through religious ministry and evangelism, particularly within the Armenians of Sydney.	
Deborah May Kilroy	For service to the community, particularly through providing assistance to women in correctional facilities.	
Ronald Alfred Kingsbury	For service to the community of Canberra through voluntary organisations, particularly those associated with the care of the ageing and people with disabilities.	
Edward Gladstone Kirk	For service to the cattle industry, particularly as a Brahman breeder, to local government, and to the community.	
Elizabeth Evelyn Kirkham	For service to the community, particularly through the Guiding movement and church groups.	
Ivan George Kolarik	For service to the community, particularly through the development of improved relationships between the police and people of non-English speaking backgrounds.	
Magdolna Kozak	For service to the Hungarian community in Sydney.	
Stefan Kozuharov	For service to the Bulgarian community in Sydney.	
Paul Henry Kregor	For service to the community through a range of organisations providing care for people with disabilities.	
John Charles Krummel	For service to the arts, particularly through the Marian Street Theatre.	
Barbara Anne Lacy	For service to the community, particularly through organisations fostering ecumenism.	
Jack Lang	For service to the community, particularly through the Sir Moses Montefiore Jewish Home and the Uniting Church Wayside Chapel.	
Donald William Lavers	For service to the development of the avocado industry.	
Kenneth Alexander Lawson	For service to the communities of Tully and Cardwell, and to local government.	
Sister Carmel Leavey	For service to Catholic education, particularly as a researcher, and to the community.	
Stephen Chinghin Lee	For service to education, particularly through the promotion of Chinese language teaching in Victoria.	
Graeme Colvin Legge	For service to local government, and to the community of Emerald.	
Robin Letts	For service to the community of Donald through a range of service and sporting groups and publication of the local newspaper.	
Clive Maxwell Linnett	For service to the community of Ivanhoe through a range of service groups, and to local government.	
Ronald Robert Lipman	For service to the community of Tamworth.	
Karunatissa Halgahawatta Liyanaratchi	For service to the Sri Lankan community of Victoria.	
Timothy Donald Looker	For service to youth through the development of outdoor recreation and camping programmes through the YMCA of South Australia.	
Ack Sing Louey	For service to the Chinese community of Victoria.	
Lois Joyce Loughnan	For service to the community of Georges River.	
Benjamin Love	For service to the community, particularly through ex-Service and youth groups.	
Carolyn Alice Lowry	For service to the arts and to the community, particularly through the restoration of the Independent Theatre in North Sydney.	
Peter Ernest Lowry	For service to the arts and to the community, particularly through the restoration of the Independent Theatre in North Sydney.	
Shirley Anne Lowy	For service to the Jewish community through the Chai Foundation.	
Edna Grace Lyle	For service to the community through the Youth Hostels Association.	
Reginald Bruce MacDonald	For service to the print media, and to the community of Bendigo.	
Mary Eleanor Maclean	For service to the community of the South Coast region.	
William John Madden	For service to the community, particularly veterans and their families.	
Gary John Madsen	For service to cricket administration.	
Mary-Magdalena Majlath	For service to the Hungarian community of Sydney.	
Kathleen Ormiston Malta	For service to the communities of Mandurah and Peel.	
Ronald John Marcus	For service to the community through Rotary International.	
Hazle Ann Marland	For service to primary industry, to local government, and to the community.	
Robert William Marshall	For service to the community, particularly through the establishment of stroke support groups.	
Arthur Howie Marshall	For service to conservation and the environment through the identification of threatened plant species and as a contributor to botanical collections in Australia.	
Charles Percival Martin	For service to the community of the Mid North Coast region.	
Ronald Harry Maston	For service to veterans and to the community through the 2/30th Battalion Association.	
Elaine Frances Mayer	For service to the community through the Australian Tinnitus Association (NSW).	
Peter Hayden McCall	For service to the communities of Springvale and Dandenong.	
Councillor Norma Joan McCausland	For service to local government, and to the communities of Berwick and Casey.	
Ellen June McDonald	For service to education through the Essex Heights Primary School, and to the community.	
Robert Herbert McDonald	For service to the development of the apiary industry, and to the community.	
Maureen Therese McGrath	For service to the community of Yass.	
Hugh Malcolm McKay	For service to basketball as a coach and administrator.	
Colin Henry McKinnon	For service to the community, particularly through the Ryde Sub-Branch of the Returned and Services League of Australia.	
Valarie Margaret McPherson	For service to the community, particularly children as a foster carer.	
Olive Martha McVicker	For service to the arts, particularly through the City of Hamilton Art Gallery, and to the community.	
Sybil Jean Mehl	For service to the community of Moruya.	
Professor Robert Charles Menary	For service to the development of agricultural industries, particularly the essential oils and plant extract industry in Tasmania.	
Bruno Metsar	For service to the Estonian community of Melbourne through cultural activities and the ethnic Scouting and Guiding movements.	
Douglas Leigh Miles	For service to the community of Pyramid Hill, and to the dairy industry.	
Constance Norma Millett	For service to the community of Clunes.	
Judith Moffatt	For service to the development of the protea and native cut flower industries, particularly in Queensland.	
John Arthur Montgomery	For service to the community through fundraising for charitable groups in the Sydney Northern Beaches area.	
Ross Newton Moore	For service to the community of Toronto.	
Alfred Douglas Morgan	For service to local government, and to the communities of Northam and Avon.	
Lawrence Louis Muller	For service to the Australian dairy industry, particularly in the fields of dairy science and technology.	
Gerard Victor Murphy	For service to people with disabilities through the Raymond Terrace and Lower Hunter Centre Riding for the Disabled Association.	
Paul William Murphy	For service to the community of Newcastle.	
Susan Frances Murray	For service to the community of Canberra, particularly through the Spiral Club.	
Barbara Joan Musgrove	For service to the community of Tilligerry through the development and construction of a number of recreational projects designed to protect the natural environment.	
Rosemary Nairn	For service to the community of South Australia as a musical director, conductor, composer and educator.	
Jean Persis Neely	For service to the community, particularly through the Guiding movement and the Australian Red Cross.	
Henry James Nesbitt	For service to veterans, particularly through the Ex-Prisoners of War Association.	
Timothy Donnelly Nevard	For service to conservation and the environment, particularly through the development of the Mareeba Wetlands.	
Peter William Newell	For service to the community of the Illawarra region.	
Joan Clare Newman	For service to the community of Casino.	
James Nicholson	For service to the communities of Oatley and the Georges River, particularly through care for the ageing.	
Dr Harold Alexander Noble	For service to the community of the New England region, particularly through health service organisations.	
Desmond John Noll	For service to youth in South Australia, particularly through the Noorla Yo-Long Blue Light Youth Camp.	
Margaret Mary O'Callaghan	For service to the community, particularly as an advocate for the welfare of the ageing.	
Thelma Jean O'Neill	For service to the community of the Australian Capital Territory, particularly through the activities of Blackfriars Catholic Parish and the Catholic Women's League.	
Shane Arthur O’Connor	For service to surf lifesaving in Queensland.	
Wilma Barbara O’Connor	For service to the communities of Fairfield and Bankstown, particularly through support for family day care and the Bankstown Bi-Centenary Youth Foundation.	
Richard John O’Dea	For service to youth in South Australia through the establishment and operation of the Errappa Blue Light Youth Camp.	
Ian O’Halloran	For service to the community of Castlemaine.	
Sister Mary Joan O’Leary	For service to the communities of Lithgow and Portland, particularly through the provision of social welfare and support services.	
Alfred On	For service to the Chinese community of the Northern Territory.	
Lawrence Gregory O’Sullivan	For service to the community through the promotion of social justice and the protection and maintenance of civil liberties, and to the law.	
Rosemary Owens	For service to athletics as an administrator and coach.	
Michael Sidney Page	For service to the community of Blaxland and the Lower Blue Mountains area.	
Dorothy May Pargeter	For service to education, particularly in the areas of curriculum development and student welfare, and as a member of a range of South Australian educational bodies.	
Betty Joyce Parsons	For service to the community of Wollongong, particularly through music education and the Business and Professional Women's Club.	
Peter William Partridge	For service to local government in north eastern Tasmania.	
Alan Arthur Patterson	For service to education, particularly in the areas of student support and curriculum development, and to the community of Melton.	
John Edmund Patterson	For service to the community of Hobsons Bay, particularly in the areas of conservation, heritage, and health administration.	
Dr Paul Paviour	For service to music, particularly within the community of Goulburn, as an educator, composer and musician.	
Alan John Pearson	For service to the community of New Norfolk.	
Leslie Norman Peart	For service to the communities of Mount Beauty and Bright, and to local government.	
Thelma Mary Pendlebury	For service to the community, particularly through the Bexley Uniting Church.	
Malcolm Richard Penn	For service to visually impaired people, particularly in the areas of cricket and education.	
Mavis Joyce Percy	For service to the community of Forestville.	
Major Phillip Lacey Perman	For service to the arts, and to the communities of the Australian Capital Territory and Queanbeyan.	
Stewart Petering	For service to local government, and to the communities of the Wimmera Mallee area.	
Colin Lindsay Philpott	For service to the rural communities of Western Australia, particularly as Chairman of the Country High School Hostels Authority.	
Grant Stanley Pierce	For service to local rural communities in Tanzania through the planning, initiation and supervision of community development projects including educational, fresh water and health facilities.	
Margaret Elizabeth Pinchback	For service to the community of Albany.	
Marie Joan Pinkerton	For service to the community of the Sutherland Shire, particularly through junior soccer.	
Daryl Norman Pinner	For service to the community through the Victorian Branch of the Royal Australian Armoured Corps Association.	
William Robert Polley	For service to canine breeding and showing through the Royal Canine Council of New South Wales and the Fox Terrier Club.	
John Henry Pretty	For service to the community of Jindivick.	
Eileen Grace Priest	For service to the community of Nyngan.	
Dailan Pugh	For service to forest conservation, particularly in north eastern New South Wales.	
Herbert George Rae	For service to the communities of Berwick and Narre Warren North.	
Noel Eric Reid	For service to the community of Narrandera.	
Harold Keith Ridgway	For service to the community of Koo Wee Rup.	
Lois Marjorie Ritchie	For service to the community as a voluntary musical accompanist for choirs, theatrical groups, individual singers and instrumentalists.	
George Alexander Roberts	For service to the recording and preservation of aviation history, and to vintage and veteran car organisations.	
Jacob Barney Rosenblum	For service to the Jewish community of Sydney.	
Eric Oxley Row	For service to the veteran community, particularly through the welfare activities of the Concord Sub-Branch of the Returned and Services League of Australia.	
Dr Elizabeth Stuart Rozenbilds	For service to hospital administration in South Australia.	
Peggy Irene Rule	For service to the community of Gippsland, particularly through the Australian Red Cross and the National Council of Women.	
Margaret Merline Russell	For service to women through the Penrith Pregnancy Support Service.	
Lorna Rayner Rutledge	For service to the community of Nowra.	
Dr Leo Peter Ryan	For service to dentistry, particularly through the promotion of oral health education and fluoridation of public water supplies, and through the Queensland Branch of the Australian Dental Association.	
Denise Marie Ryan	For service to the community through mental health organisations and support for mental health care reform in Queensland.	
Nives Sain	For service to education, particularly through the Loreto College, Marryatville.	
Joan Mavis Sainsbury	For service to the community, particularly through the Kincumber Holy Cross Parish and the Society of St Vincent de Paul.	
Richard Henry Sasse	For service to the community of the Morawa Shire.	
The Honourable Joseph John Schipp	For service to the Parliament of New South Wales, and to the community of Wagga Wagga.	
William John Schneider	For service to the Beef Shorthorn cattle industry, and to the community of the Manning Valley district.	
Peter Schramm	For service to wetland restoration and conservation along the Murray River in South Australia, particularly the rehabilitation of the Loveday Wetlands.	
Anthony John Scott	For service to the community through fundraising for charitable organisations and as an advocate for veterans.	
Kylie Margaret Scotter	For service to croquet, particularly through the Manly Croquet Club.	
Sister Margaret Therese Scroope	For service to Catholic education as a teacher, principal and administrator.	
Leonardo Antonio Scundi	For service to community and charitable organisations through fundraising activities.	
Edward Soroszczuk Selwyn	For service to the law and to the community through the New South Wales Legal Aid Commission.	
Alan John Shannon	For service to the community of Young, and to local government.	
Gwenda Eunice Shannon	For service to the community of Armidale.	
Maureen Anne Sheargold	For service to the community of the Sunshine Coast, particularly through the establishment of the Maroochy Regional Botanic Gardens.	
Merrilyn Jane Shepherd	For service to the community, particularly as an advocate for people with intellectual disabilities.	
Victor Colin Shepherd	For service to the welfare of veterans through the St Marys Sub-Branch of the Returned and Services League of Australia, and to the community.	
Stanley James Sherringham	For service to athletics through the Sutherland Districts Athletics Association and Athletics New South Wales.	
Keith Cameron Sims	For service to sport, particularly through the South Australian Amateur Football League.	
Alan Menzies Sinclair	For service to local government in the Parry Shire, and to natural resource management.	
Stanley Raymond Sindel	For service to aviculture as an author, breeder and researcher of Australian parrots, lorikeets and cockatoos.	
George William Slattery	For service to the community of Mount Gambier.	
Captain Anthony Russell Smith	For service to tourism, and to the community by raising awareness of environmental issues affecting the health of the Murray-Darling River system.	
Aileen Frances Smith	For service to the community of Launceston, particularly through musical groups, and to tennis administration.	
Beryl Mary Smith	For service to education, particularly for children who are deaf or hearing impaired, and to women through the ACT Branch of the Australian Federation of University Women.	
Ian Crawford Smith	For service to the community of Ballarat, and to the Organ Historical Trust of Australia.	
June Smith	For service to the community of George Town through local government, health and social welfare services, and community events.	
Robert Arthur Smith	For service to surf lifesaving in New South Wales as an administrator and official, and to the Wauchope community through sporting organisations.	
Robert Naylor Smyth	For service to the people of East Timor through the 2/2nd Commando Association Independent Trust Fund.	
Mona Lilian Sowden	For service to the community of Oakey.	
Isobel Mary Sparrow	For service to the communities of Nannup and Busselton.	
Christopher Lee Stannard	For service to the community, particularly through the restoration and preservation of maritime heritage vessels of the Sydney Maritime Fleet.	
Dr Peter Alan Stanton-Cook	For service to the communities of Murwillumbah and Kingscliff, particularly through health care organisations.	
Halina Statkus	For service to the Lithuanian community in Melbourne.	
Simon Leslie Stein	For service to the community through fundraising for charitable organisations.	
Bernice Monica Steinhauer	For service to the community of Hoppers Crossing through the St Peter Apostle Parish and Primary School.	
Patricia Ann Stewart	For service to the community, particularly through the Australian Multiple Birth Association.	
Lieutenant Colonel Keith Edmund Sticpewich	For service to the prune industry, and to the community.	
Wayne Douglas Stuart	For service to the designing and building of an Australian concert grand piano.	
Timothy John Sullivan	For service to local government, and to the community of Orange.	
Annette Irene Swaffield	For service to the Guiding movement, particularly through the Australian Adult Leadership Program and the Australian Trainers Training Program.	
Marie Lois Sweeney	For service to hockey administration and junior hockey in Rockhampton.	
Gwyneth Lloyd Terry	For service to the community through Community Information Victoria and Community Information Diamond Valley.	
Joyleen Hilda Thomas	For service to the ageing and people with disabilities, particularly through Community Options, the Community Living Project, and the training of service providers.	
Robert Stanley Thorpe	For service to the community, particularly through the Variety Clubs of Australia.	
Robert William Tomlin	For service to the welfare of veterans and their families in Mittagong.	
Rowena Evelyn Trieve	For service to the South Sea Islander community	
Alfred Donald Trounson	For service to the community as creator of the National Photographic Index of Australian Birds.	
Dr John William Upjohn	For service as Brigade Medical Officer for the Metropolitan Fire and Emergency Services Board.	
Christopher Peter Vardon	For service to local government, and to the community of the Eurobodalla Shire.	
Charles David von Stieglitz	For service to the community of Evandale.	
Robert Albert Wade	For service to watercolour painting as an artist, educator and promoter of Australian art.	
Patricia Betty Walker	For service to the community, particularly through the Foster Care Association (New South Wales) Inc.	
Albert Francis Wallace	For service to golf administration, and to the Muscular Dystrophy Association of New South Wales through fundraising activities.	
Cecil William Wallach	For service to the community through the Royal United Services Institute of Victoria.	
The Reverend Father Joseph Patrick Walsh	For service to the community through the Catholic Church.	
Francis David Ward	For service to the community of Campbelltown and district.	
Thomas James Watson	For service to the aerial agricultural industry in Australia.	
Brian Edward Webb	For service to the community, particularly through teaching people with a disability to play lawn bowls.	
Colin Maxwell Webber	For service to veterans through the North Ryde Sub-Branch of the Returned and Services League of Australia, and to the community.	
Cecelia Gow Webster	For service to the community of Devonport.	
Captain Eric Hantley Weinman	For service to the shipping industry, particularly in the area of maritime training standards and certification.	
Kevin Walter Wellfare	For service to the welfare of veterans, particularly through the New South Wales Branch of the Korea and South East Asia Forces Association of Australia.	
Janice Dorothy West	For service to nursing, particularly as the Director of Nursing at the Coolah District Hospital.	
Howard Douglas Wheaton	For service to the community of Armidale.	
Dr Geoffrey Douglas White	For service to medicine in rural areas, particularly through the Rural Doctors Association of Australia, and to the community of Manilla.	
Dr Margaret Winifred White	For service to the community through the fostering of cross-cultural understanding in the education system.	
Captain Norman Harold White	For service to international relations through the promotion of cultural, business and education interests between Australia and Japan.	
Ronald George Whitehead	For service to the community, particularly through the Bankstown Hospital, the Bankstown Frail Aged Persons' Homes Trust and Lions International.	
Allan Whiter	For service to the community of Eden.	
Simon Kim Whittle	For service to the community through the Buderim War Memorial Community Association.	
Kenneth Wiggins	For service to the community, particularly through the Sussex Inlet Lions Club.	
Mavis Bertha Wilkinson	For service to the community of Singleton.	
Jean Rhonda Williams	For service to Vietnam veterans and their families.	
Noel Eric Williamson	For service to the community, particularly through Downs Group Training, the Rotary Club of Toowoomba South, the Toowoomba Hospital Foundation and the Toowoomba District Health Council.	
Betty Wilson	For service to the community, particularly through the Country Women's Association of New South Wales.	
Richard John Wolany	For service as a sponsor of community, charitable and sporting groups.	
Peter Regalado Wood	For service to fostering interest in the history of the 1893 New Australia settlement in Paraguay.	
Dr David Francis Yeates	For service to the community, particularly as the Medical Superintendent at Boonah Hospital.	
Murray Gordon Young	For service to the community, particularly through organisations supporting people with disabilities.	
Roy Alfred Zimmerman	For service to education, particularly through the Junior School Heads Association of Australia and Newington College.	

==== Military Division ====
Branch	Recipient	Citation	Notes
Navy	Commander David Llewelyn McCourt	For meritorious service to the Royal Australian Navy, particularly as Commanding Officer HMAS KANIMBLA in support of Operation SLIPPER.	
Navy	Lieutenant Commander Graham Frank Williams	For meritorious service to the Royal Australian Navy in the field of Marine Technical Engineering.	
Navy	Warrant Officer Macinty James Winner	For meritorious service to the Royal Australian Navy, particularly in the technical support to HMAS DARWIN and to the Marine Technical profession.	
Army	Warrant Officer Class One Gary John Howard	For meritorious service to the Australian Army as the Regimental Sergeant Major Land Command Battle School and The Pilbara Regiment.	
Army	Major Christopher Wayne Kassulke	For meritorious service to the Australian Army, particularly as a logistician within the Army's aviation capability.	
Army	Warrant Officer Class One Roger Edwin Lambert	For meritorious service to the Australian Army as the Regimental Sergeant Major of the 4th Battalion (Commando), The Royal Australian Regiment and the 4th Battalion Group on Operation TANAGER.	
Army	Warrant Officer Class One Dale Leonard Mitchell	For meritorious service to the Australian Army in the fields of logistics and combat service support.	
Army	Warrant Officer Class One Wayne Lee Parker	For meritorious service to the Australian Army as the Regimental Sergeant Major of 23rd Field Regiment, as the Regimental Sergeant Major of the School of Artillery, and as the Master Gunner of Land Command Artillery.	
Army	Warrant Officer Class One Christopher Brett Ross	For meritorious service to the Australian Defence Force and the Australian Army in the field of communications.	
Army	Warrant Officer Class One Rodney Harold Speter	For meritorious service to the Australian Army, particularly as the Regimental Sergeant Major of the 4th/3rd Battalion, The Royal New South Wales Regiment and of the 5th/7th Battalion, The Royal Australian Regiment.	
Air Force	Group Captain Andrew Robert Hayden	For meritorious service to the Australian Defence Force in the performance of duty as Chief Engineer within the Defence Material Organisation in support of technical airworthiness.	
Air Force	Flight Sergeant Mark James Osborn	For meritorious service to the Royal Australian Air Force in the field of explosive ordnance engineering.	
