= List of University of Technology Sydney people =

This is a list of University of Technology Sydney people, including notable alumni and staff.

== Notable alumni ==
=== Academia ===
- Martin Bean – former vice-chancellor at the Open University and the Royal Melbourne Institute of Technology
- Anthony D. Burke – Professor of Politics and International Relations at the University of New South Wales
- Judith Beveridge – Australian poet and research supervisor at the University of Sydney
- John Croucher – Australian statistician and Professor of Management at Macquarie University
- Rosalyn Diprose – Emeritus Professor of philosophy at the University of New South Wales
- Hatice Gunes – Professor of Affective Intelligence and Robotics at the University of Cambridge
- Margaret Simons – Associate Professor of journalism at Monash University
- Sender Dovchin – Research Professor and Dean of International at Curtin University

=== Architecture ===
- Jeremy Edmiston – Australian architect
- Penelope Seidler – Australian architect

=== Business ===
- Joanne Gorton – CEO of Deloitte Australia
- Robin Khuda – billionaire founder of AirTrunk
- Richard White – billionaire founder of WiseTech Global
- Daniel Hendler – deputy managing director of Meriton Group and grandson of Harry Triguboff
- Peter Agnew – deputy chair of Surf Life Saving Australia
- Russell Balding – former managing director of the Australian Broadcasting Corporation (ABC)
- Andre Soelistyo – CEO and co-founder of GoTo and Gojek
- Nina Blackwell – former senior director at Yahoo! and press secretary to former U.S. senator Hillary Clinton
- Kate Burleigh – managing director of Intel in Australia and New Zealand
- Maile Carnegie – group executive of ANZ Banking Group (ANZ) retail division and former managing director of Google Australia
- Neil Chatfield – former chairman of Virgin Australia and former non-executive director at Transurban
- Cristina Pieta Cifuentes – Economist and former board member of the Australian Energy Regulator
- Rob Coombe – Chairman of Colonial First State and former chairman of MLC Limited
- Cathryn Cox – Executive Director of Health System Planning and Investment, NSW Ministry of Health
- Larry Diamond – Founder & CEO of Zip Co
- Jacqui Feeney – managing director of Fox International Channels (Australia and New Zealand)
- Mark Fitzgibbon – CEO and managing director of nib Health Funds
- Sean Gordon AM (Bachelor of Education in Adult Education, 2000; 2016 UTS Faculty of the Arts and Social Sciences Alumni Award Recipient) – managing director and owner of Gidgee Group, an Indigenous-owned and -managed consultancy; also co-convenor of the Liberals for Yes group, and member of the First Nations Referendum Working Group for the 2023 Australian referendum
- Todd Greenberg – CEO of the National Rugby League
- Rachel Grimes – former CFO (Technology) of Westpac
- Kristanti MBA – Canadian CEO/CFO (UTS Alumni 1996). Former Finance Manager at Energizer Battery (Eveready/ Union Carbide/ Ralston Purina)
- Vanessa Hudson – CEO of Qantas
- Frances Hughes – former CEO of the International Council of Nurses (ICN)
- Ben Kennedy – Founder & CEO of Gecko
- George Koukis – founder and former chairman of Temenos AG
- Simon Kubica – Co-founder and CEO of Index, Y Combinator-backed software company
- Ido Leffler – Israeli-Australian entrepreneur
- Geoff Lloyd – former CEO of MLC Limited
- Graeme Mason – CEO of Screen Australia
- Kim McKay – CEO of Australian Museum
- Bettina McMahon – Executive General Manager, Government and Industry Collaboration and Adoption, Australian Digital Health Agency
- David Murray – former CEO of the Commonwealth Bank (CBA)
- Warwick Negus – Non-executive director at Dexus and former managing director at Goldman Sachs
- Gregory Poche – founder and former chairman of StarTrack
- George Savvides – former managing director of Medibank
- Nicky Sparshott – CEO of Unilever Australia and New Zealand
- Vivian Wong – Group Vice President (Higher Educations Technologies) of Oracle Corporation
- Jim White – Senior Vice President (Human Resources) of Paramount Pictures

=== Government ===
==== Politicians ====
===== Premiers of New South Wales =====
- Morris Iemma – former Premier of New South Wales (2005–2008)

===== Federal politicians =====
- Ash Ambihaipahar – Member of the House of Representatives for Barton, representing the Australian Labor Party
- Nicolette Boele – Member of the House of Representatives for Bradfield, unaffiliated with a party
- Tanya Plibersek – Member of the House of Representatives for Sydney, representing the Australian Labor Party and former Deputy Leader of the Opposition
- Roger Price – Former member of the House of Representatives for Chifley, representing the Australian Labor Party
- Susan Templeman – Member of the House of Representatives for Macquarie, representing the Australian Labor Party
- Matt Thistlethwaite – Member of the House of Representatives for Kingsford Smith, representing the Australian Labor Party

===== Australian state and territory politicians =====
- Bryan Doyle – Australian politician
- Matt Kean – Australian politician
- Wendy Machin – former Australian politician
- Natasha Maclaren-Jones – Australian politician
- Daniel Mookhey – Australian politician
- Marjorie O'Neill – Australian politician
- Anthony Roberts – Australian Politician
- John Robertson – former Leader of the Labor Party in New South Wales
- Henry Tsang – former Deputy Lord Mayor of Sydney

===== International politicians =====
- He Rong – Minister of Justice of the People's Republic of China
- Sekai Holland – Zimbabwean senator
- Gibran Rakabuming Raka – Vice President of Indonesia, previous Mayor of Solo in Indonesia
- Shawn Atleo – former National Chief of the Assembly of First Nations in Canada

==== Public servants ====
- Michael Coutts-Trotter – director general of the NSW Department of Family and Community Services

=== Humanities ===
==== Arts ====
- Charlotte Best – Australian actress and model
- Natasha Liu Bordizzo – Australian actress and model
- Anh Do – Vietnamese-born Australian actor, author and comedian
- Genevieve Clay-Smith – Australian filmmaker
- Hugh Jackman – Australian actor, singer and producer
- Sophie Lee – Australian actor and author
- Yiying Lu – Chinese-born graphic designer and artist
- Alyssa McClelland – Australian director and actress
- James Millar – Australian actor
- Zoe Naylor – Australian actress
- Amanda Palmer – film executive
- Chris Plummer – New Zealand film editor
- Chris Taylor – Australian performer and comedian
- Rachel Ward – Australian actress and film director
- Emma Watkins – Australian actress and The Wiggles member
- Allanah Zitserman – Australian film producer

==== History ====
- Jeannine Baker – historian and research fellow at Macquarie University

==== Journalism ====
- David Astle – Australian author, broadcaster and columnist
- Jayne Azzopardi – Australian television presenter for Weekend Today & Nine News
- Brooke Boney – Entertainment reporter at Nine Network's Today show
- Kathryn Eisman – Australian fashion and lifestyle television journalist, author and former model
- Jan Fran – Australian journalist
- Lynda Kinkade – Australian journalist and anchor at CNN
- Sonia Kruger – television presenter
- Joel Labi – news anchor and producer
- Caroline Meldrum-Hanna – Australian journalist
- Timothy Palmer – Australian journalist at the Australian Broadcasting Corporation
- Lara Pitt – Australian television presenter and sports journalist
- Georgia Rickard – Australian travel journalist

==== Literature, writing and poetry ====
- Anna Funder – Australian writer and winner of the Miles Franklin Award
- Nikki Gemmell – Australian writer
- Kate Grenville – Australian author
- Yvette Holt – Australian poet
- Janine Shepherd – Australian author

=== Law ===
- Elizabeth Broderick – Australian Sex Discrimination Commissioner (2007–2015)
- Margaret Cunneen – deputy senior crown prosecutor of New South Wales
- Kate Eastman AM SC – Law Reform Commissioner with the New South Wales Law Reform Commission
- Tricia Kavanagh – former Justice of the NSW Industrial Court and Deputy President of the NSW Industrial Relations Commission
- Jane Needham – Judge, Federal Court of Australia
- Sandy Street – former Judge of the Federal Circuit Court of Australia

=== Sciences ===
- Sarah Benson – Chief forensic scientist at the Australian Federal Police
- Jordan Nguyen – Bio-medical engineer, inventor, and futurist
- Lily Serna – Australian mathematician and television presenter
- Jade Tan-Holmes – creator and host of the Up and Atom YouTube channel
- Vanessa Peterson – Australian chemist at ANSTO.

=== Sport ===
- John Allen – teacher, rugby player and cricketer
- Lachie Anderson – rugby union player
- Jo Brigden-Jones – Australian kayaker
- Bart Bunting – former Australian skier, Salt Lake City Paralympic gold medalist
- James Chapman – former Australian rower, London Olympic silver medalist
- Pat Cummins – Australian cricketer
- Nina Curtis – Australian sailor, London Olympic silver medalist for sailing
- Claudia Gunjaca – Australian rules football player
- Alyssa Healy – Australian cricketer
- Katie Kelly – Australian paratriathlete, Rio Olympic gold medalist
- Boyd Killingworth – rugby union player
- Adrienne Marie – former Australian volleyball player
- Alexander Purnell – Australian rower, Tokyo Olympic gold medalist
- Hayder Shkara – former Australian taekwondo athlete
- Danielle Small – former Australian soccer player
- Lucinda Whitty – Australian sailor, London Olympic silver medalist
- Gavin Woods – former Australian water polo player

=== Other ===
- Mervyn Bishop – Australian photographer

== Notable staff ==
- Debra Adelaide – Australian novelist, writer and academic
- Philip A. Gale – British supramolecular chemist
- Stan Grant – Australian journalist
- Nick Kaldas – Deputy commissioner of the New South Wales Police Force
- Michael Keane – American economist
- Antony Kidman – Australian psychologist and academic
- Rosetta Martiniello-Wilks – Australian cancer researcher
- Ann Moyal – Australia historian
- Jim Peacock – Australian molecular biologist
- Göran Roos – Swedish academic and businessman
- Louise Ryan – Australian biostatistician
- Rosie Scott – Australian and New Zealand novelist
- Margaret Trask – Australian librarian
- Helen Vatsikopoulos – Australian journalist
- Cynthia Whitchurch – Australian microbiologist
- Mary-Anne Williams – Australian scientist
- Steve Wozniak – American electronics engineer and entrepreneur

== Administration ==
=== Chancellors ===
Order	Chancellor	Years	Notes
1	RN Johnson	1989–1999	
2	Sir Gerard Brennan	1999–2005	
3	Vicki Sara	2005–2016	
4	Brian Wilson	2016	
5	Catherine Livingstone	2016–present	

=== Vice-Chancellors ===
Order	Vice-Chancellor	Years	Notes
1	RD Guthrie	1988–1996	
2	AJD Blake	1996–2002	
3	RE Milbourne	2002–2014	
4	Attila Brungs	2014–2021	
5	Andrew Parfitt	2021–present	
