= Diana Davis (disambiguation) =

Diana Davis (born 2003) is a Russian ice dancer.

Diana Davis may also refer to:

- Diana Davis (Sliders), a character from Sliders
- Diana Davis (journalist), English-born Australian journalist
