= Căprioara =

Căprioara may refer to several places in Romania:

- Căprioara, a village in Săvârșin Commune, Arad County
- Căprioara, a village in Recea-Cristur Commune, Cluj County
- Căprioara, a village in Hamcearca Commune, Tulcea County
- Căprioara, a tributary of the river Priboiasa in Vâlcea County

== See also ==
- Capra (disambiguation)
