= Rosetta Martiniello-Wilks =

Australian oncologist

Rosetta Martiniello-Wilks is an Australian cancer researcher. She is a former senior lecturer at the University of Technology Sydney (UTS) in Ultimo, Sydney, Australia. Martiniello-Wilks was a core member of the Centre for Health Technologies at UTS and head of the Translational Cancer Research Group in the School of Medical and Molecular Biosciences, Faculty of Science, UTS.

Martiniello-Wilks' research includes searching for prostate cancer cures by developing gene and cell therapies and other innovative technologies:

New cancer hope (UTS website article) – "Prostate cancer (PCa) is the most commonly diagnosed cancer among men in Australia and many other western countries. If treated early with surgery, PCa has a cure rate of over 90 per cent. However, once advanced, it is incurable. Dr Martiniello-Wilks with Professor Pamela Russell, CSIRO lead scientists Dr Gerry Both, Dr Peter Molloy, Dr Trevor Lockett and their laboratories, have developed a cutting-edge 'direct delivery method' for advanced local PCa. This Gene Medicine for PCa uses a unique and safe virus to deliver a suicide gene, in a targeted manner, to prostate cells."

== Biography ==
Martiniello-Wilks is a translational scientist who takes basic science discoveries and translates them into the clinic. In collaboration with CSIRO, Martiniello-Wilks' research contributed to the development of a "Gene Medicine" for Stage II prostate cancer based on novel viral vector delivery and suicide gene technologies. Aspects of this patented work (6 national/international patents with Martiniello-Wilks listed as an Inventor) has received Therapeutic Goods Administration (TGA) CTX approval for a Phase 1 clinical trial (registered NCT00625430).

Other highlights of Martiniello-Wilks' research include: a CSIRO Chairman's Medal Platinum Nomination; attraction of >$9.5 million competitive research funding from the National Health and Medical Research Council (NHMRC), Prostate Cancer Foundation of Australia and Movember, Sydney Cancer Centre Foundation; the Australian Cancer Research Foundation; the Cancer Institute of New South Wales.

In 2010, Martiniello-Wilks was recruited to UTS as a senior lecturer and core member of the Centre for Health Technologies, a vehicle for developing health research findings. Martiniello-Wilks no longer leads the Translational Cancer Research Group (TCRG) in the development of novel cell and gene therapies for cancer metastases; in biomarker discovery for the development of novel assays for early cancer detection and prognosis.

Martiniello-Wilks has been an AGTS member since 1997; she initiated the AGTS Member Best Paper Prize and the AGTS Lifetime Member Award. Martiniello-Wilks currently serves as president of AGCTS,

She is a former chairperson of the UTS Biosafety Committee, and co-convenor of the UTS Biomedical Seminar Series.

== Research areas ==
- Novel non-invasive diagnostics distinguishing slow growing from lethal prostate cancer.
- Tri-modal targeted stem cell gene therapy for Prostate Cancer metastases
- Production of insulin-secreting bone marrow-derived mesenchymal stem cells – Australian Diabetes Society – Skip Martin Award
