= Capraia (disambiguation) =

Capraia may refer to:

- Capraia, an Italian island, the northwesternmost of the seven islands of the Tuscan Archipelago
- Capraia (Tremiti), an Italian island, in the Tremiti Archipelago
- Capraia Isola, municipality in the Province of Livorno in the Italian region of Tuscany
- Capraia e Limite, municipality in the Metropolitan City of Florence in the Italian region Tuscany

== See also ==
- Capra (disambiguation)
