= Doreen Rosenthal =

Australian psychological, adolescent health and HIV/AIDS researcher

Doreen Rosenthal AO FASSA
- Born: Doreen Anne Lapin; 1938 (age 87–88); Melbourne, Victoria, Australia
- Other name: Doreen Anne Rosenthal
- Occupations: Psychologist, academic
- Known for: Adolescent sexual health
- Children: 3
- Awards: Victorian Honour Roll of Women

Academic background
- Education: MacRobertson Girls' High School
- Alma mater: University of Melbourne
- Thesis: An investigation of some factors influencing development of formal operational thinking (1975)

Doreen Anne Rosenthal AO FASSA (born 1938) is an Australian academic and adolescent sexual health and women's health researcher. As of 2020, she is a Professor Emerita in the School of Population Health at La Trobe University and Honorary Professor in the Melbourne School of Population and Global Health at the University of Melbourne.

== Academic career ==
Born Doreen Anne Lapin in Melbourne, Victoria in 1938, Rosenthal matriculated from MacRobertson Girls' High School in 1955. Married and with three young children, Rosenthal graduated from the University of Melbourne in 1972 with a BA, majoring in psychology. Continuing at that university, she then completed a PhD in 1975 with her thesis titled An investigation of some factors influencing development of formal operational thinking.

Her research has included studies of homeless young people, their drug use, why they leave home and their HIV risk. Another focus of her research has been women's sexual health. She has also studied ethical questions in research and collaborated on projects in Botswana, Indonesia and Vietnam.

== Honours and recognition ==
Rosenthal was elected a Fellow of the Academy of the Social Sciences in Australia in 1998. She was made an Officer of the Order of Australia in the 2003 Australia Day Honours for "outstanding service nationally and internationally to understanding of and research into adolescent health, particularly in the fields of sexual health and HIV/AIDS". In 2007 she was inducted onto the Victorian Honour Roll of Women.

== Selected works ==
- Moore, Susan; Rosenthal, Doreen (1993), Sexuality in adolescence, London Routledge, ISBN 978-0-415-07527-5
- Moore, Susan; Rosenthal, Doreen; Mitchell, Anne (1996), Youth, AIDS, and sexually transmitted diseases, London Routledge, ISBN 978-0-415-10633-7
- Rosenthal, Doreen A.; Feldman, S. Shirley, eds. (2002), Talking sexuality: Parent-adolescent communication, Jossey-Bass, ISBN 978-0-7879-6325-5
- Rosenthal, Doreen A.; Moore, Susan (2012), New age nanas: Being a grandmother in the 21st century, Big Sky Publishing, ISBN 978-1-921941-41-2
- Rosenthal, Doreen A.; Moore, Susan (2018), The psychology of retirement, Routledge, ISBN 978-1-351-16988-2
- Moore, Susan; Rosenthal, Doreen A. (5 June 2019), Second child: Everything you need to help you decide, plan for and enjoy a second child, Big Sky Publishing (published 2019), ISBN 978-1-922265-39-5
