= John Schaeffer (art collector) =

Australian art collector (1941–2020)

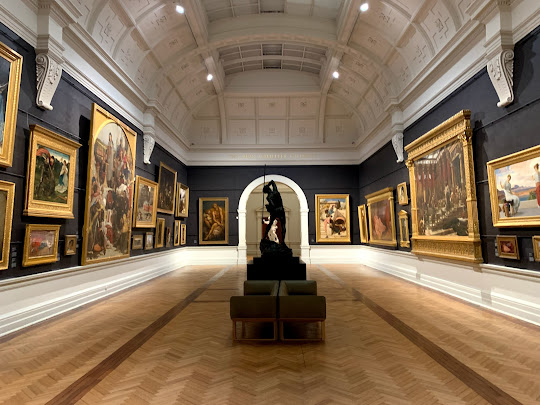
The John Schaeffer Gallery at the Art Gallery of New South Wales

John Herman Schaeffer AO (27 May 1941 – 14 July 2020) was a Dutch-born Australian art collector, philanthropist and businessman. Schaeffer predominantly collected 19th-century British art, specialising in works by the Pre-Raphaelite Brotherhood. Schaeffer emigrated to Australia from the Netherlands in the late 1950s, working as a ship's steward. In Australia Schaeffer established a security and cleaning company, Tempo Services Ltd., which he later sold. In 2004 Schaeffer sold Rona, previously the most expensive house in Sydney, which he had acquired in 1989.

Schaeffer initially collected 19th-century Australian paintings, but was entranced by the 1984 exhibition The Pre-Raphaelites at Tate Britain. His initial art purchases in the 1970s were Australian paintings by Rupert Bunny, E. Phillips Fox and John Russell. Three paintings from Schaeffer's collection (all purchases) are in the permanent collection of the Leighton House Museum in Holland Park, West London. The restoration of the gilded ceiling of the Narcissus Hall at Leighton House was also supported by Schaeffer. Schaeffer's art collection held 200 pieces at its peak, but was greatly diminished by business debts and the financial effects of his divorce.

Together with his partner, Bettina Dalton, Schaeffer was a part-owner of the British Movietone Archive. Schaeffer was a board member of the National Gallery of Australia Foundation, as well as a board member and Life Governor of the Art Gallery of New South Wales. He was appointed an Officer of the Order of Australia in the 2003 Australia Day Honours.

Schaeffer died at St Vincent's Hospital on 14 July 2020 at the age of 79 after being hit by a utility vehicle on Macquarie Street in central Sydney.

== Personal life ==
With his first wife, Kerry Robertson, Schaeffer had a daughter named Joanne, who was born in 1975. The marriage ended three years later. He was married to film-maker Julie Basford from 1994 to 2002. For the last eighteen years of his life, Schaeffer was married to Bettina Dalton, and was the stepfather of her daughters Pnina and Chana.
