= The Inventors (Australian TV program) =

Australian TV Show (1970 to 1982)

The Inventors is an Australian ABC TV program which ran from 1970 to 1982. At its peak it was one of the ABC's highest rating programs.

In each episode, a number of inventors would show their invention, and it was critiqued by a panel of three judges, who announced a winner at the end of the show. Most episodes were 30 minutes long, though the end-of-year finale, in which a yearly winner was announced, ran longer.

For the majority of the show's run, the host was Geoff Stone, and the panel was Leo Port, Diana Fisher and Vic Nicholson. Port died in 1978 and was replaced by Neville Stephenson. In 1980, all of the presenters except Fisher left to start a similar program on the Nine Network, What'll They Think Of Next?
