= Capra =

Capra may refer to:

- Capra (genus), comprising the goats
- Capra (goat dance), a Romanian custom
- Capra (titular see), a titular see in the Catholic Church
- Capra (car), a pick-up brand from the Iranian Bahman Group

== People ==
- Buzz Capra (born 1947), American baseball player
- Carlo Capra (1889-1966), Italian soccer player
- Frank Capra (1897–1991), American film director
- Frank Capra Jr. (1934–2007), American studio manager
- Francis Capra (born 1983), American actor
- Fritjof Capra (born 1939), American physicist
- Mike Capra (born c. 1945), Australian academic
- Sandra Capra, Australian nutritionist
- Vinny Capra (born 1996), American baseball player

=== Fictional characters ===
- Andrew Capra, one of the suspects in Tess Gerritsen's thriller novel The Surgeon
- Eddie Capra, central character in the television series The Eddie Capra Mysteries

== Geography ==
Rivers in Romania:

- Capra, a tributary of the Ciocadia in Gorj County
- Valea Caprei, a tributary of the Dașor in Bihor County
- Capra, a tributary of the Motrul Sec in Gorj County
- Capra (Bicaz), a tributary of the Bicaz in Neamț County
- Capra Mică, a tributary of the Tărlung in Brașov County
