= Solvig Baas Becking =

Australian textile artist (1928–2011)

Solvig Baas Becking AM (12 August 1928 – 2011) was an Australian textile artist.

== Early life ==
Baas Becking was born on 12 August 1928 in Balikpapan, Borneo, Indonesia, of Swedish-Dutch parents. She studied weaving in Sweden and Amsterdam.

== Career ==
Baas Becking moved to Australia in 1963 and established a studio in Canberra in 1964 and later in Mongarlowe, NSW in 1976. She exhibited widely around Australia and in America and New Zealand.

She moved to Mongarlow, New South Wales in 1975 and was a founding member of the NSW Greens She demonstrated a commitment to the environment in her work and often highlighted the beauty of the common gum leaf in her weaving techniques. Her work is held in many public and private collections, including the National Gallery of Australia and was featured in the Know My Name exhibition in 2021. Both the NSW and Commonwealth Parliament Houses commissioned her to make floor rugs for their buildings

Baas Becking was appointed a Member of the Order of Australia (AM) in 2003 for service to arts and crafts, particularly through developmental work in textile art in Australia and with the modern craft movement, and as a teacher and a mentor.
