= Diana Fisher =

Australian television personality (1931–2023)

The Honourable Diana Fisher OAM
- Born: Diana Beresford Davis; 30 May 1931; London, England, United Kingdom
- Died: 26 January 2023 (aged 91); Sydney, New South Wales, Australia
- Other name: Bubbles
- Occupations: Journalist; television personality; radio presenter; newspaper and magazine writer
- Years active: 1951−2015
- Known for: Television personality and royal correspondent
- Television: The Inventors; Beauty and the Beast; Midday; Heartbreak High
- Spouse: Humphrey Fisher (married 1959)
- Relatives: Geoffrey Fisher (father-in-law)

Diana Beresford Fisher OAM (née Davis; 30 May 1931 – 26 January 2023) was an English-born Australian journalist, television and radio presenter, social commentator and royal correspondent. Fisher is arguably best known for being a judge on The Inventors on ABC TV from 1970 to 1982.

== Career ==
=== Early career ===
Born in London, some of Fisher's early jobs including being a circus ringmaster, a magician's assistant and a revue dancer. She joined the BBC in 1951 as a researcher. In this role, Fisher compiled briefs for BBC commentators as they covered various notable events such as the funeral of Winston Churchill, the Coronation of Elizabeth II, and the royal weddings of Princess Margaret, Prince Edward and Princess Alexandra.

In the late 1950s, she joined British Overseas Airways Corporation as a stewardess where she worked until she was married. After her marriage, she worked as a personal assistant to David Niven and Deborah Kerr before returning to the BBC.

=== Later career ===
Fisher emigrated to Australia in 1964 when her husband, a BBC television producer, was transferred there. In Australia, Fisher became a household name through her work in the media. In 1965, Fisher became one of the "beauties" on the original version of Beauty and the Beast on the Seven Network, hosted by Eric Baume and then Stuart Wagstaff. She also hosted her own radio programs and appeared on the 2BL radio program Let's Find Out hosted by Ellis Blain in 1967.

Fisher briefly returned to London when her husband was tasked to head up the BBC's science and features division. While there, she worked on the BBC nature program Almost Human. Fisher returned to Australia in 1969 when her husband took up a position as head of the features and documentaries department at the Australian Broadcasting Commission.

Fisher's profile rose even further as one of the judges on ABC TV's The Inventors program which ran from 1970 to 1982, originally hosted by Geoff Stone. She was the only member of the original cast to remain with the program during the entire run. Fisher remained with the program when its executive producer Beverley Gledhill, host Geoff Stone, and her fellow judges Vic Nicholson and Neville Stephenson defected to the Nine Network to launch a rival program called What'll They Think Of Next?. Fisher also became known for editing social pages in various Australian newspapers and magazines, including her "On The Go" column in The Sydney Morning Herald, and her social pages in The Sunday Telegraph.

In late 1979, Fisher joined The Australian Women's Weekly but she spent only nine months editing the "Here, There & Everywhere" pages until she quit when editor Ita Buttrose told Fisher that it wasn't working out and asked her what she wanted to do. Fisher said she had been frustrated by the treatment of her social pages at The Australian Women's Weekly. In a newspaper interview after leaving the magazine, Fisher said "I did not get what I was promised – four pages and colour. Sometimes the column was dropped altogether. They'd say: 'There's no social this week, Diana'. I mean I don't mind giving up my column for the Queen on a royal visit, but once I was out for two weeks running. There was no continuity. My friends were phoning me up and saying 'Have you been sacked, Diana. Are you ill?'" Fisher felt that her parting from the magazine, which was owned by Nine Network owner Kerry Packer, may have been a flow-on effect from her decision to remain with the ABC rather than defect to Nine with her colleagues from The Inventors. Fisher then went on to edit the social pages in Woman's Day.

In 1981, she was a correspondent for the Seven Network covering the royal wedding of Prince Charles and Lady Diana. When Network 10 and the Seven Network both revived their own versions of Beauty and the Beast in 1982, Fisher returned as a beauty on the Network 10 version, hosted by John Laws.

On 16 July 1991, Fisher, Geraldine Doogue, Bruce Ruxton, Mark Day, Normie Rowe and Ron Casey, were invited onto the Nine Network's Midday program to discuss whether Australia should become a republic. The program, hosted by Ray Martin, attracted widespread publicity after Rowe and Casey became involved in a physical altercation during the debate. Fisher was the only guest to make any attempt at stopping the fight by repeatedly yelling "Stop it!" to the two men. Fisher made a cameo appearance on a 1994 episode of the Network 10 series Heartbreak High.

In the 2003 Australia Day Honours, Fisher was awarded the Medal of the Order of Australia "for service to the community through a range of charitable organisations, and to the broadcast media." In 2015, she was interviewed by Craig Bennett for Network 10's Studio 10 where she recounted various events including the Midday brawl and her experiences as a royal correspondent.

== Personal life and death ==
Throughout her life, she was known as "Bubbles" owing to her bubbly personality. In 1959, she married BBC television producer Humphrey Fisher, the son of the Archbishop of Canterbury, Geoffrey Fisher, at Lambeth Palace. Upon her father-in-law becoming Lord Fisher of Lambeth upon his retirement in 1961, Fisher was bestowed with the title of "The Honourable Mrs Humphrey Fisher".

Fisher and her husband separated in 1974, but never divorced. They remained friends and Fisher described their relationship as "happily separated". Humphrey Fisher died in 1996.

Fisher died from non-Hodgkin lymphoma at St Vincent's Private Hospital in Sydney, on 26 January 2023, 4 months before her 92nd birthday.
