= Georgia Rickard =

Australian journalist

Georgia Rickard is an Australian journalist, magazine editor, author and media commentator. Rickard is a former editor of an Australian magazine company, Australian Traveller, and has contributed to News Limited, Conde Nast, Fairfax Media, BBC and several newspapers of note, including the South China Morning Post and The Times.

== Early career ==
Rickard began her career in sales for a recruitment agency. She later credited this for the foundations of an entrepreneurial outlook as a magazine editor. Under the tutelage of Valerie Khoo, she transitioned to journalism, contributing on a freelance basis to titles such as Cosmopolitan, CLEO, Women's Health, GQ, Prevention, and the Sunday Telegraph.

At 23, Rickard became editor of Healthy Food Guide magazine, making her the youngest Australian editor of a national title at the time. It was her first formal role in publishing. Despite the globally declining climate of magazine sales, the title achieved consistent growth, going on to remain the nation's fastest growing food title for the four consecutive audits of her tenure. Rickard assisted in the launch of the UK edition of the same title, was twice nominated for Best Health Magazine at the Australian Magazine Awards (2009, 2010) and appeared as a journalist and expert on Australian television programs such as Sunrise, Mornings with Kerri-Anne, Today Tonight and Channel Nine News. During that time, she presented regular segments on breakfast radio, most notably on Classic Rock FM's Sydney program Mornings with Anthony Maroon and 4BC's Brisbane breakfast program. She also worked as an industry advisor to the Australian Democratic Party, providing advice and an industry perspective on shaping government public health policies in 2010.

At the time of her resignation, Healthy Food Guide's circulation had grown from 31,670 to 44,025, with her final issue closing at 50,000 copies.

Her first book, Weight Training for Dummies (Australian and New Zealand edition), was released in 2011.

== Travel journalism ==
Rickard joined the team as editor of Australian Traveller magazine in 2012. During her three-year tenure she expanded circulation, achieving the fastest growing magazine circulation of any title in Australia in the audit period of Jan–Jun 2014. She received multiple industry plaudits for her work including top-four shortlisting as Editor Of The Year, top-four shortlisting for Magazine of the Year, and winner overall of Niche Magazine of the Year at the Australian Magazine Awards, as well as finalist listing for Food Travel Writer of the Year by the Australian Society of Travel Writers.

Among her changes to the title were the instigation of celebrity covers — which featured notable Australians including journalist Lisa Wilkinson, actress Claudia Karvan, and model Megan Gale, — as well as collaboration with emerging Australian influencers, and an 'image-first' approach to storytelling, which involved sending photographers to destinations without an accompanying writer. This was a tactic she later noted was initially met with reluctance by industry and publicists, until it proved an adaptive means of communication for the changing needs of an increasingly time-poor and digitally focused reader; she also instigated guidelines on a company-wide approach to social media, dedicating considerable resources to the growth of the magazine's official Instagram account at a time when social media was not generally considered a priority for print publications. During her tenure, Rickard also began strengthening the relationship between Australian Traveller and Australia's national tourism body Tourism Australia which, at the time, still included domestic tourism promotion in its remit. The Australian Traveller editorial team, led by Rickard, produced several custom publications on the organisation's behalf.

Rickard resigned in February 2015 and commenced an associate editor role at Marie Claire Australia in March 2015, recruited as part of a two-person team by legendary fashion editor, Jackie Frank, to move the publication into its next phase alongside new editor Nicky Briger. After just four months in the role, Rickard resigned in August 2015. Shortly thereafter she rejoined Australian Traveller on a consultative basis, working with Tourism Australia to oversee production of content for its Coastal and Aquatic campaign.

In 2016, Rickard was recruited by Fairfax Media as Managing Editor, to lead production on Tourism Australia's million-dollar overhaul of Australia.com alongside content marketing agency, Storyation. With Tourism Australia's internal team, Rickard and her hand-picked team – some 20 of Australia's most respected travel journalists – produced over 710 feature articles, overhauling site into an editorial destination of its own right. The project achieved measurable increases in several notable metrics; industry publication AdNews later asserted that the project "redefine[d] content" in the Australian market. The project received Finalist for Best Content Driven website in 2017's worldwide Content Marketing Awards.

== Entrepreneurialism ==
Rickard is part-owner of The Travel Bootcamp, an immersive consumer event with a focus on digital storytelling and influence sponsored by Olympus Australia and Intrepid Travel. The event was co-founder by Lauren Bath – a travel Instagrammer often referred to as "Australia's First Professional Instagrammer" – and Liz Carlson, founder of prominent travel blog Young Adventuress and TedX speaker. The Bootcamp has appeared on 60 Minutes (Australian edition) and in Sydney Morning Herald. The trio also founded the Modern Travel Media Summit, a bi-annual industry conference held in Australia in partnership with industry body, TravMedia.

She holds a Bachelor of Communications and a diploma in International Marketing from the University of Technology, Sydney.
