= Bob Merriman =

82nd & 86th Mayor of the Borough of Queenscliffe
- In office 4 December 2008 – 13 November 2012
- Preceded by: Pat Semmens
- Succeeded by: Hélène Cameron
- In office 22 November 2018 – 27 November 2019
- Preceded by: Susan Salter
- Succeeded by: Ross Ebbels

Councillor at the Borough of Queenscliffe
- In office 4 December 2008 – 18 November 2020

Chairman of Cricket Australia
- In office 21 September 2001 – 20 October 2005
- Preceded by: Denis Rogers
- Succeeded by: Creagh O'Connor

Personal details
- Born: Robert Frederick Merriman; August 22, 1935 Geelong, Victoria, Australia
- Occupation: Sports administrator; mayor

Robert Frederick Merriman AM (born 22 August 1935) is a former Australian cricket official and local government mayor.

Merriman played club cricket with Melbourne Cricket Club and Geelong Cricket Club. He was president of the Geelong Cricket Association from 1965 to 1976, the president of Cricket Victoria from 1997 to 2007 and Australia's delegate on the International Cricket Council's executive and ICC development international boards.

He managed the Australian team to India in 1979 and became the Australian Cricket Board's first full-time manager from 1984 to 1986, which included tours to England, India, the United Arab Emirates and New Zealand. During this time he completed reading Kim Hughes' speech of resignation when the latter was unable to finish.

From 2001 to 2005 he was chairman of Cricket Australia. In January 2003 he was made a Member of the Order of Australia.

From 2008 to 2020, Merriman served three terms as a councillor at the Borough of Queenscliffe, the smallest local government area in the state of Victoria. He was elected Mayor on two separate occasions.

In January 2019, Merriman was quoted by the Geelong Advertiser as saying, "we came here to improve things and some of the people who owned the land also enjoyed some significant change in their lifestyle," in reference to the massacre of Indigenous Australians by the British.
