= Joel Labi =

Australian journalist

- Born: November 20, 1987 (age 39); Sydney, Australia
- Occupation: Journalist

Joel Labi (Joel David Labi, born 20 November 1987) is an Australian journalist and communications professional, who worked with CNN, Reuters and 2GB. Since 2006, Labi has covered stories in the United States, Australia, Asia and the Middle East. Joel was the Chief News Anchor for radio personality Alan Jones (radio broadcaster), who hosts Australia's highest-rated radio program. In May 2017, Labi joined Thomson Reuters as a News Anchor and Reporter, working on programs for ViuTV, CGTN, TRT World and other global affiliates.

== Early life and career ==
Labi was born in Sydney Australia on 20 November 1987. While completing a Bachelor of Communication, majoring in journalism from the University of Technology Sydney, Labi completed an internship with 2GB, which would later lead him to the role of on-air anchor.

In 2006, when Labi was just 18, he secured an on-air role with 2GB (part of Macquarie Media), Australia's highest-rated radio station. Within three years, he'd become the youngest person in the station's history to be promoted to breakfast news anchor, working alongside Australia broadcaster Alan Jones (radio broadcaster).

In this role, he was twice nominated as the nation's "Best News Reader" by the Australian Commercial Radio Association.

Away from the anchor desk, Labi reported on major stories including the London 2012 Olympics, deadly conflict on the Israel/Gaza border and numerous Australian elections.

In 2014, Labi relocated to New York, becoming the station's US correspondent, where he reported on major stories from the United Nations, Wall Street and the White House.

== CNN ==
Joel Labi joined CNN in 2015 in Atlanta, where, aside from news show producing, he reported on Australian politics stories, thwarted terror attacks in Australia, the Sicilian Mafia as well as breaking news situations including Tel Aviv's violent riots in May of that year.

Following a promotion in 2016, Joel relocated to Hong Kong to produce 'News Stream', anchored by Kristie Lu Stout, CNN's flagship program in Asia.

== Thomson Reuters ==
In May 2017, Labi joined Thomson Reuters as a freelance news anchor and reporter, reporting on some of the region's biggest stories for global networks including CGTN, TRT World, Sky News and i24 News, as well as hosting nightly news shows for Hong Kong's ViuTV.

In his time with Reuters, Labi was on the frontlines of Hong Kong's anti-extradition protests, including the June 12 demonstrations which saw police fire tear gas for the first time since the 2014 Umbrella Movement. He also covered stories including the 2017 Japanese elections from Tokyo, North Korea's numerous missile launches, the US-China trade war and Huawei's rapid expansion and various business challenges.

Labi's reportage also extended to business news, providing daily market coverage for Reuters clients, including in-depth analysis of significant movements across the Asian financial world.

== Corporate communications ==
Labi began working in the corporate communications sector, initially via Australian venture capital fund Redfield Asset Management.

As the fund's communications director, he developed communications strategies to assist portfolio companies, including Californian cannabis omnichannel operator ManifestSeven (formerly MJIC, Inc) and Israeli cyber security firm Votiro.

By May 2017, Labi shifted to work exclusively with ManifestSeven, taking on the role of Vice President of Communications, leading up to the company's anticipated public offering on the Canadian Securities Exchange.

== Personal life ==
Labi is also a notable supporter of the Sydney Roosters NRL club, often appearing as the team's corporate and game day host.

Labi recently returned to Sydney, Australia.
