= Sandra Capra =

Australian nutritionist and dietitian

Sandra Capra AM
- Education: University of Sydney; University of Birmingham; University of Queensland
- Known for: Development of the Malnutrition Screening Tool
- Awards: Member of the Order of Australia (2003)
- Scientific career
- Fields: Nutrition and dietetics
- Workplaces: University of Queensland; University of Newcastle; Queensland University of Technology

Sandra Capra AM is an Australian nutritionist and dietitian who is an Emeritus Professor of Nutrition at the School of Human Movement and Nutrition Sciences at the University of Queensland. She is known for her contributions to practice-based research in nutrition and dietetics, including the development of clinical tools such as the Malnutrition Screening Tool (MST).

Capra served three terms as President of the Dietitians Association of Australia (DAA) and was President (chair of the board) of the International Confederation of Dietetic Associations (ICDA) from 2004 to 2016. She was appointed a Member of the Order of Australia (AM) in 2003 and was named one of the Australian Financial Review and Westpac's "100 Women of Influence" in the Global category in 2014.

== Education ==
Sandra Capra earned a Bachelor of Science with Honours (BSc(Hons)) and a Diploma in Nutrition and Dietetics from the University of Sydney. She subsequently completed a Master of Social Science (MSocSc) at the University of Birmingham and a Doctor of Philosophy (PhD) at the University of Queensland.

== Career ==
Capra spent more than 15 years in professional practice as a clinical dietitian, dietitian-in-charge, and food services manager in Sydney, Melbourne, Dunedin (New Zealand), and Brisbane.

Capra began her academic career in 1988 at the Queensland University of Technology (QUT), where she served as a Lecturer, Senior Lecturer, and later associate professor in Nutrition and Dietetics. She remained at QUT for 15 years.

In 2003, she moved to the University of Newcastle, where she was appointed Professor of Nutrition and Dietetics and later served as Head of the School of Health Sciences (2005–2007).

In 2008, Capra joined the University of Queensland (UQ) as Professor of Nutrition. During her tenure at UQ, she also served as Director Academic for the School of Human Movement and Nutrition Sciences (2014–2016). She was appointed emeritus Professor upon her retirement from full-time academia in January 2019.

Capra served as President (chair of the board) of the International Confederation of Dietetic Associations (ICDA) for 12 years (2004–2016). In early 2017, she was appointed executive director of the International Commission for Dietetics and Nutrition Education and Accreditation, implementing an international program of competency development and program accreditation.

According to Google Scholar, Capra has authored or co-authored over 240 published works, which have received more than 9,200 citations, with an h-index of 36.

== Research ==
Capra's research focuses on practice-based nutrition and dietetics, food and nutrition policy, and quality outcomes for food and nutrition services in various settings including hospitals, residential aged care, and community health. Her work emphasises the development of clinical assessment tools and quality improvement systems for service delivery.

=== Clinical screening and assessment tools ===
Capra developed the Malnutrition Screening Tool (MST) in 1999 with Maree Ferguson, Judy Bauer, and Merrilyn Banks, which consists of two questions assessing recent unintentional weight loss and appetite to identify patients at risk of malnutrition at hospital admission. The tool demonstrated high inter-rater reliability (93–97%) as well as convergent and predictive validity, with at-risk patients showing poorer nutritional parameters and longer hospital stays. Its original validation study had been cited more than 1,100 times by 2025. Capra also contributed to the Acute Care Patient Satisfaction with Foodservice Questionnaire, developed in 2005 with Olivia Wright and colleagues to measure patient satisfaction with hospital foodservices. She contributed to the Meal Assessment Tool (MAT), developed with Mary Hannan-Jones in 2017 to assess meal quality and intake among hospital patients. In addition, she co-developed a modified Constipation Assessment Scale with Elisabeth Isenring and Judy Bauer in 2005 to evaluate bowel health in patients receiving radiotherapy.

=== Cancer and nutrition support ===
Capra has conducted research on nutrition intervention in oncology. A randomised controlled trial demonstrated that intensive dietetic intervention using the American Dietetic Association (now Academy of Nutrition and Dietetics) medical nutrition therapy protocol significantly improved dietary intake and quality of life in radiation oncology outpatients compared to standard practice. Research on patients with unresectable pancreatic cancer showed that compliance with nutrition prescription and weight stabilisation were associated with improved survival duration and quality of life.

=== Aged care nutrition ===
Capra was a principal investigator on the Australian Commonwealth Department of Health and Ageing project "Implementing best practice nutrition and hydration support in Residential aged care," part of the national "Encouraging Best Practice in Residential Aged Care" program. She has supervised multiple doctoral students working on standards and quality in residential aged care food services.

== Awards and honours ==
- 2022: Fellow, Queensland Academy of Arts and Sciences
- 2014: Winner (Global Leadership category), Australian Financial Review/Westpac 100 Women of Influence
- 2005: Fellow, Dietitians Association of Australia (first appointed)
- 2003: Member of the Order of Australia (AM)
- 2001: Life Member, Dietitians Association of Australia

== Selected publications ==
=== Books ===
- Capra, S. (1988). The Australian Diabetic's Guide to Good Eating. Book 2. Brisbane: Princess Alexandra Hospital. ISBN 0-9593927-2-6.
- Capra, S.; Isaacs, N. (1985). Dietitians Association of Australia Handbook No 2: Guidelines for Dietetic Practice. DAA.

=== Journal articles ===
- Ferguson, M.; Capra, S.; Bauer, J.; Banks, M. (1999). "Development of a valid and reliable malnutrition screening tool for adult acute hospital patients". Nutrition. 15 (6): 458–464. doi:10.1016/S0899-9007(99)00084-2. PMID 10378201.
- Bauer, J.; Capra, S.; Ferguson, M. (2002). "Use of the scored Patient-Generated Subjective Global Assessment (PG-SGA) as a nutrition assessment tool in patients with cancer". European Journal of Clinical Nutrition. 56 (8): 779–785. doi:10.1038/sj.ejcn.1601412. PMID 12122555.
- Isenring, E. A.; Capra, S.; Bauer, J. D. (2004). "Nutrition intervention is beneficial in oncology outpatients receiving radiotherapy to the gastrointestinal or head and neck area". British Journal of Cancer. 91 (3): 447–452. doi:10.1038/sj.bjc.6601962. PMC 2409852. PMID 15226773.
