= Pamela Russell =

Australian immunologist (died 2022)

Pamela Russell AM FAHMS

Personal details
- Died: February 2022
- Occupation: Immunologist, medical researcher

Pamela J. Russell (died February 2022) was an Australian academic researcher of immunology, bladder cancer and prostate research. Russell was awarded Membership of the Order of Australia (AM) for her research on prostate and bladder cancer in 2003.

== Biography ==
Russell was Emeritus Professor at the Institute of Health and Biomedical Innovation, Queensland University of Technology, based at the Translational Research Institute (Australia) and adjunct professor, Centre for Advanced Imaging, University of Queensland.

== Education and training ==
Russell trained in immunology at Walter & Eliza Hall Institute, where she obtained an MSc with Sir Macfarlane Burnet. Subsequently, Russell completed a PhD with Sir Gustav Nossal, on studies of autoimmune diseases.

Russell's postdoctoral training was at the John Curtin School of Medical Research, Canberra, and then she moved to Sydney to take up a postdoctoral position at The Kolling Institute of Medical Research.

Russell joined the APCRC – Q in 2009.

== Research ==
Russell's early work in Immunology on Systemic Lupus Erythematosus (SLE) showed that the immunosuppressive drug, cyclophosphamide, could be successfully used to treat animals with this disease, leading to its use in patients with SLE. Early work WEHI showed that T cells could kill cancer cells. Further studies of autoimmunity were performed by Russell's group at the Kolling Institute specifically SLE. but also some related work in rheumatoid arthritis and in ankylosing spondylitis and its association with HLA-B27.

Russell's focus of the work at the Kolling Institute was on autoimmunity, specifically Systemic Lupus Erythematosus (SLE), but also some related work in rheumatoid arthritis and in ankylosing spondylitis and its association with HLAB27.

In 1984, Russell changed her research focus to cancer and, with Dr. Derek Raghavan, established the Urological Cancer Research Centre at Royal Prince Alfred Hospital/University of Sydney. Russell then directed the Oncology Research Centre (ORC), Prince of Wales Hospital from 1992 to 2010, as conjoint Professor of Medicine, University of New South Wales (UNSW).

Russell then moved to the Translational Research Institute and the Australian Prostate Cancer Research Centre in Queensland in 2012.

== Awards ==
- 2015 Women in Technology Life Sciences Outstanding Achievement Award
- 2015 Fellow of the Australian Academy of Health and Medical Sciences
- 2015 University of Canberra Alumni Excellence Award Health Winner
- 2010 Inaugural Prostate Cancer Foundation of Australia Prize and Lecture for Outstanding Excellence
- 2010 Prostate Cancer Foundation of Australia's Researcher of the year
- 2009 Life Member, Australasian Gene Therapy Society
- 2009 Alban Gee Prize for best poster presentation at USANZ
- 2007 Member of the year, listed in Madison's Who's Who
- 2006 Honorary Life Member, Prostate Cancer Foundation of Australia
- 2006 Awarded prize for outstanding alumni of Kolling Institute of Medical Research (75th Jubilee)
- 2005 Listed in Marquis Who's Who in Medicine and Healthcare, USA
- 2003-2005 Listed in Who's Who, Australia
- 2003 Platinum Nomination for the CSIRO Chairman's medal. Gene Therapy: A new approach for treating prostate cancer
- 2003 AM for outstanding contributions to prostate and bladder cancer research
- 1962 Dunlop Rubber prize for Biochemistry
- 1960 Commonwealth Scholarship

== Selected publications ==
- Singh P, Joshi S, Russell PJ, Verma N, Wang XC, Khatri A. Molecular chemotherapy and Chemotherapy: A new front against late stage hormone refractory prostate cancer. Clinical Cancer Research. 2011; 17(12): 1–13
- Hung TT, Chan J, Russell PJ, Power CA. Zoledronic acid preserves bone structure and increases survival but does not limit tumour incidence in a prostate cancer bone metastasis model. PLoS ONE . 2011, 6(5): e19389, 1-8
- Tang C, Russell PJ, Martiniello-Wilks R, Rasko J, Khatri A. Concise Review: Nanoparticles and cellular carriers - allies in imaging and therapy? Stem cells. 2010; 28(9):1686-702-702
- Khatri A, Husaini Y, Ow K, Chapman J, Russell PJ. Cytosine Deaminase-Uracil Phosphoribosyl Transferase and Interleukin-12 and -18: a multimodal anticancer interface marked by specific modulation in serum cytokines. Clin Cancer Res.2009; 15(7):2323-2234.
- Li Y, Song E, Rizvi SMA, Power CA, Beretov J, Raja C, Cozzi PJ, Morgenstern A, Apostolidis C, Allen BJ, Russell PJ. Inhibition of micrometastatic prostate cancer cell spread in animal models by 213Bi-labeled multiple targeted a radioimmunoconjugates. Clin Cancer Res. 2009; 15:865-875
