= Douglas Albert Pucknell =

Electrical engineer and textbook author (born 1927)

- Born: 1927
- Education: University of Adelaide (PhD)
- Occupations: Electrical engineer, academic, author
- Known for: Basic VLSI Design (with Kamran Eshraghian); Transition equations for sequential circuits
- Scientific career
- Fields: Digital systems, microcomputer-based engineering, VLSI design
- Workplaces: University of Adelaide
- Thesis: An interface for small digital computers: 'universal' hardware concepts in engineering applications (1973)
- Doctoral advisors: David C. Pawsey
- Doctoral students: Neil Weste

Douglas Albert Pucknell (born 1927) is an electrical engineer and author, formerly an associate professor at the University of Adelaide, whose work centred on digital systems, microcomputer-based engineering and VLSI design. With Kamran Eshraghian he wrote the textbook Basic VLSI Design, first published in 1985 and in its third edition by 1994, and in 1981 the two gave the first VLSI course in Australia.

== Early life and education ==
Pucknell served in the Electrical Branch of the Royal Navy and then worked in industry before taking up teaching and research at the University of Adelaide. In 1960, with J. A. Irvine, he described a wide-range, fully automatic digital voltmeter in the Journal of the British Institution of Radio Engineers, and he took part in the published discussion of a paper on electronic digitising techniques in the same issue.

His doctoral thesis in Adelaide's Department of Electrical Engineering, An interface for small digital computers: 'universal' hardware concepts in engineering applications, is dated 1971, and he was awarded the PhD in 1973. His doctoral adviser was David C. Pawsey.

== Career and research ==
Pucknell introduced "transition equations" as an alternative to existing methods of analysing and synthesising clocked sequential switching circuits, first in Electronics Letters in 1970. He extended the approach to the characterisation and synthesis of combinational and sequential circuits in the Proceedings of the Institution of Electrical Engineers in 1973, and in 1981 applied it to the design of registers for successive-approximation analogue-to-digital converters. His other early work used digitally controlled voltage sources as general-purpose interface elements for interface conversion and function generation. In the 1990s, he proposed an event-driven logic (EDL) approach to the representation and design of fast digital systems.

With co-authors he also worked on computer memory and arithmetic. With Bryan Ackland he reported simulation studies of cache storage in a real-time minicomputer environment, finding direct mapping the most effective approach (1975). With R. C. Debnath he developed a general method for detecting multiplicative overflow in residue number systems (1978). With Malcolm L. J. Raymond he extended memory-hierarchy concepts to the microcode store (1981) and described re-orderable content random-access memory (RECRAM) and related content-addressable arrays (1982).

Pucknell was one of the contributors, with Peter Cole, Neil Weste, Andrew Davis and John Bell, to ULOS (1974–1977), a colour raster-scan display system believed to be the world's first colour computer-aided design system for integrated circuit layout. With Ackland, John Rogers, Weste and others, Pucknell is credited with the first microprocessor programming course in Australia, in 1976, and in 1981 he and Eshraghian gave Australia's first VLSI course. With Michael J. Liebelt, Malcolm Raymond and N. Wotton he described, in a 1982 paper in the Institution of Electrical Engineers' journal Software & Microsystems, the supporting facilities needed for microprocessor and microcomputer applications at several levels of sophistication. The authors argued that, because microprocessor teaching is largely hands-on, the equipment needed for teaching and for applications work is much the same, and that inexpensive low-level support could later be extended to higher levels.

=== Teaching and supervision ===
Neil Weste, whose 1977 PhD thesis described an interactive integrated-circuit design system using monochrome and colour graphics, was one of Pucknell's doctoral students.

== Books ==
Basic VLSI Design: Principles and Applications, written with Kamran Eshraghian, was published by Prentice-Hall of Australia in Sydney in 1985, together with a study guide. A second edition, subtitled Systems and Circuits, followed in 1988, and a third edition appeared in Prentice Hall's Silicon Systems Engineering Series in 1994. Prentice Hall of India has also published the book. In the same series, Pucknell wrote Fundamentals of Digital Logic Design: With VLSI Circuit Applications (1990), and with Kamran and Sholeh Eshraghian he co-wrote Essentials of VLSI Circuits and Systems (Prentice-Hall of India, 2005).

- Pucknell, Douglas A.; Eshraghian, Kamran (1985). Basic VLSI Design: Principles and Applications. Sydney: Prentice-Hall of Australia. ISBN 0-13-067851-1.
- Pucknell, Douglas A.; Eshraghian, Kamran (1985). Study Guide to Basic VLSI Design. Sydney: Prentice-Hall of Australia.
- Pucknell, Douglas A.; Eshraghian, Kamran (1988). Basic VLSI Design: Systems and Circuits (2nd ed.). Englewood Cliffs, New Jersey: Prentice-Hall. ISBN 0-13-067877-5.
- Pucknell, Douglas A. (1990). Fundamentals of Digital Logic Design: With VLSI Circuit Applications. Silicon Systems Engineering Series. Prentice Hall. ISBN 0-7248-0432-3.
- Pucknell, Douglas A.; Eshraghian, Kamran (1994). Basic VLSI Design. Silicon Systems Engineering Series (3rd ed.). Sydney: Prentice Hall. ISBN 0-13-079153-9.
- Eshraghian, Kamran; Pucknell, Douglas A.; Eshraghian, Sholeh (2005). Essentials of VLSI Circuits and Systems. New Delhi: Prentice-Hall of India. ISBN 978-81-203-2772-6.

== Selected publications ==
- Irvine, J. A.; Pucknell, D. A. (1960). "A wide-range fully-automatic digital voltmeter". Journal of the British Institution of Radio Engineers. 20 (7): 536–540. doi:10.1049/jbire.1960.0061.
- Pucknell, D. A. (1970). "Interface conversions and function generation using digitally controlled voltage sources". Proceedings of the Institution of Electrical Engineers. 117 (5): 912. doi:10.1049/piee.1970.0180.
- Pucknell, D. A. (1970). "'Transition equations' for the analysis and synthesis of sequential circuits". Electronics Letters. 6 (23): 731–733. doi:10.1049/el:19700507.
- Pucknell, D. A. (1973). "Sequential-circuit characterisation and synthesis using a 'transition-equation' approach". Proceedings of the Institution of Electrical Engineers. 120 (5): 551. doi:10.1049/piee.1973.0116.
- Ackland, B. D.; Pucknell, D. A. (1975). "Studies of cache store behaviour in a real-time minicomputer environment". Electronics Letters. 11 (24): 588–590. doi:10.1049/el:19750450.
- Debnath, R. C.; Pucknell, D. A. (1978). "On multiplicative overflow detection in residue number system". Electronics Letters. 14 (5): 129–130. doi:10.1049/el:19780088.
- Pucknell, D. A. (1981). "TE design processes for successive-approximation A/D converter registers". IEE Proceedings E – Computers and Digital Techniques. 128 (2): 79. doi:10.1049/ip-e.1981.0015.
- Raymond, M. L. J.; Pucknell, D. A. (1981). "Aspects of memory hierarchy concepts extended to microcode-store level". IEE Proceedings E – Computers and Digital Techniques. 128 (6): 255. doi:10.1049/ip-e.1981.0050.
- Pucknell, D. A.; Liebelt, M. J.; Raymond, M. L. J.; Wotton, N. (1982). "Considerations in setting up supporting facilities for microprocessor applications work and teaching". Software & Microsystems. 1 (5): 135–140. doi:10.1049/sm.1982.0037.
- Raymond, M. L. J.; Pucknell, D. A. (1982). Re-orderable content random access memory (RECRAM) and related content addressable arrays. Microelectronics '82. doi:10.3316/INFORMIT.487642898011517.
- Pucknell, D. A. (1993). "Event-driven logic (EDL) approach to digital systems representation and related design processes". IEE Proceedings E – Computers and Digital Techniques. 140 (2): 119. doi:10.1049/ip-e.1993.0018.
