= Dean Cameron (inventor) =

Australian inventor

Dean Cameron is an Australian inventor from Maleny, Australia. He is the inventor of Biolytix and Joinlox. He has received awards for his inventions, including ABC's 2008 national New Inventors award for Joinlox, the 2007 Asian Innovation Award, the People's Choice Award at The Australian and New Zealand Innovation Awards in 2008, and the Clunies Ross Award. He owned Biolytix Water Australia Pty. Ltd. until its liquidation in 2011.

== Biolytix ==
=== How it works ===
Biolytix is a sewage treatment and filtration system that works by using natural aeration. The Biolytix Biopod is where most of the process takes place. The water gets separated for the waste and bacterium or worms decompose it into humus; an organic compound that is made by the organisms that live in soil. The Biopod is a layered filter that filters the waste out of the water. Upon installation tiger worms are introduced to the environment of the Biopod to help break down and separate the solid waste from the water. The worms dig tunnels and further aerate the waste, causing the water to trickle through the tunnels and become filtered naturally. The bottom layer is made to filter out all solids larger than 80 microns, leaving clean water at the bottom. The system uses up to 90% less electricity than other systems and has fewer moving parts to replace.

=== Invention ===
Cameron had been trying to produce methane by extracting acids from human waste. He had made an airtight system because the production of methane is anaerobic, but still, he was not getting results. There was still air in the human waste that was interfering with the production of the methane by keeping the system aerobic.

==== Failure and Liquidation ====
The product had been approved by the Department of Health in Western Australia until it put out an advisory stating that it was no longer an approved product. The system was inconsistent and to be serviced needed to be completely disassembled, or replaced. This was a $10,000 deficit to the homeowners who purchased them. Plumbers that had repaired many of them even discredited the environmental standard that they had been designed to live up to. According to Cameron the failure of the systems and the company were attributed to the heavy rain and flooding in December. Sales dropped drastically, and the company was no longer able to sustain salaries.

== Joinlox ==
Joinlox is a technology designed to make large water tanks easier and cheaper to transport. Cameron wanted a way to transport them in parts and have easy assembly at their destination. It works with interlocking teeth, similar to a zipper and is locked into place using a key piece and a hammer. It converts the flexural load and the shear load into a tensar load. The idea for the design came from the natural design that clams have to hold a load of water.

== Education ==
Cameron went to high school at Riverside High School, in Launceston, Tasmania from 1972-1973. He went on to R.M. Murray High School in Queenstown, Tasmania from 1972-1973. From 1973-1975 he attended Carmel College Bickley in Perth, Western Australia where he graduated from. He moved onto Avondale College of Higher Education where he studied Theology. He then went to the University of Queensland from 1979-1981 to get a bachelor's degree in horticulture. From there, he went to RMIT University to earn his Boilermakers Certificate at the school of Fitting and Machining. He then studied Botany at the University of Melbourne from 1983-1986 and got a bachelor's degree in environmental science from Murdoch University from 1985-1986.

== Professional life ==
Cameron started working as a design consultant for Futuresmith, a nonprofit organization. He designs Lifebubbles; these are eco friendly, zero carbon life support habitats. He owned Biolytix wastewater treatment from 2004-2011 when he had to liquidate due to the failure of the Biolytix waste system.
