= Neil Weste =

Australian electrical engineer and inventor (born 1951)

- Born: Neil H. E. Weste; 1951 (age 74–75)
- Citizenship: Australian
- Education: University of Adelaide (BSc, BE, PhD)
- Occupations: Electrical engineer, inventor, author
- Known for: Principles of CMOS VLSI Design; First IEEE 802.11a chipset (Radiata); MULGA symbolic layout system
- Awards: Clunies Ross Award (2010); Pearcey Hall of Fame (2008); Fellow, Australian Academy of Technological Sciences and Engineering (2006); Fellow of the IEEE (1996)
- Scientific career
- Fields: VLSI and CMOS integrated-circuit design, wireless LANs
- Workplaces: Bell Labs; MCNC; Duke University; University of North Carolina; Symbolics; TLW Inc. Macquarie University; Radiata Communications; Cisco; NHEW R&D; Morse Micro; Atto Devices
- Thesis: Interactive integrated circuit design: an implementation using a monochrome and colour graphics system (1977)
- Doctoral advisors: Douglas Albert Pucknell; Peter Harold Cole
- Doctoral students: Michael Boers

Neil Harry Earle Weste (born 1951) is an Australian electrical engineer and inventor known for his work on CMOS VLSI design and for co-founding Radiata Communications, which built the first chipset for the IEEE 802.11a wireless LAN standard. He co-wrote the textbook Principles of CMOS VLSI Design, first published in 1985 with Kamran Eshraghian and later revised with David Money Harris, which the Australian Academy of Technological Sciences and Engineering describes as having been a leading undergraduate text worldwide for more than twenty years.

After a PhD at the University of Adelaide, Weste spent eighteen years in the United States, at Bell Labs, Duke University and the University of North Carolina, before joining Macquarie University in 1995. Radiata, which he founded with David Skellern in 1997, was bought by Cisco for about US$295 million. He later co-founded the aviation software company OzRunways, joined the Sydney Wi-Fi HaLow chipmaker Morse Micro, and in 2024 co-founded Atto Devices, a chip-design company partnered with Macquarie University's Silicon Platforms Lab.

== Early life and education ==
Weste was born in 1951 in Renmark, in South Australia's Riverland. He studied at the University of Adelaide, where he took the degrees of Bachelor of Science, Bachelor of Engineering in electrical engineering and Doctor of Philosophy (a BSc in physics in 1974, a BE with honours in 1976 and a PhD in 1978); his final-year engineering project won the Electricity Trust of South Australia prize for best project in 1974.

As a student Weste was part of the team, with Peter Cole, Andrew Davis, John Bell and others, that built ULOS (1974–1977), a colour raster-scan display system that is believed to be the world's first colour computer-aided design system for integrated circuit layout. With John Mavor he published work on MOS amplifiers for the peripheral circuits of integrated circuits and charge-coupled devices.

== Career ==
=== Bell Labs ===
Weste joined Bell Labs at Holmdel, New Jersey, as a member of technical staff in 1977, and in 1979 was working on chip design with Bryan Ackland. At the 1978 Design Automation Conference he described a colour graphics system for IC mask design and analysis, for which he received one of the conference's artwork awards. There he developed MULGA, an interactive symbolic layout system that ran under Unix. Symbolic layout abstracts away the detail of hand-drawn integrated-circuit masks while keeping their density, saving design time and reducing errors; MULGA also included tools for extracting transistor netlists from the layout and a fast MOS timing simulator, EMU. His paper "Virtual grid symbolic layout" at the 1981 Design Automation Conference won the conference's best paper award. With Ackland he published the "edge flag" algorithm for filling polygons on raster scan displays, and with Ackland and David Burr he patented signal processors made of arrays of cells that perform dynamic time warping in parallel, for matching speech patterns. In 1983 he presented graphical aspects of symbolic IC design in "VLSI and Computer Graphics", a SIGGRAPH presentation with Fuchs, Clark, Ousterhout and Sproull.

=== North Carolina and return to Bell Labs ===
Weste spent 1981–1982 on a sabbatical year in North Carolina as vice-president of systems and design at the newly established Microelectronics Center of North Carolina and as an associate professor at Duke University and the University of North Carolina at Chapel Hill. He helped set up MCNC's design environment and taught a course in CMOS VLSI design that became the basis of Principles of CMOS VLSI Design. With Jothy Rosenberg, John Poulton and others he described a vertically integrated VLSI design environment at the 1983 Design Automation Conference. He then returned to Bell Labs as head of its Systems Architecture Research department, which worked on multiprocessors and VLSI design, and was involved in restructuring Bell Labs research ahead of the creation of Bellcore at the divestiture of AT&T.

=== Symbolics, Agile Systems and TLW ===
From the mid-1980s until 1989 Weste was director of VLSI systems at Symbolics in Cambridge, Massachusetts, where he led the team that completed the architecture, design and CAD tools for Ivory, a single-chip Lisp microprocessor of about 250,000 transistors; the team's integrated symbolic design system, NS, allowed the chip to be ported through four successively smaller fabrication processes. He was lead author of a paper on Ivory's design and verification strategy at the 1987 IEEE International Conference on Computer Design, and wrote on Lisp chips for Computer Design magazine. In 1987 NASA became Ivory's first customer, for a space-borne processor. With Paul Kollaritsch he described TOPOLOGIZER, an expert system that applied an experienced designer's rules to turn a transistor-level circuit description into a symbolic CMOS cell layout, and his textbook with Kamran Eshraghian, Principles of CMOS VLSI Design: A Systems Perspective, was published by Addison-Wesley in its VLSI Systems Series in 1985.

Weste then became vice-president of engineering at Agile Systems in Cambridge, a company formed to design symbolic multiprocessors. When its funding fell through he sold an IC development programme to Philips Research Laboratories, and the company was re-formed as TLW Inc., a contract VLSI design house in Burlington, Massachusetts, which he co-founded and led as president until 1995. The MIT engineer Christopher Terman was a co-founder of both companies. TLW's customers included AT&T Microelectronics, Analog Devices, North American Philips, IBM and Sun Microsystems, and its designs included a single-chip television ghost canceller, RAMDACs, GSM filter chips, video decompression chips and the Analog Devices AD7008 direct digital synthesis chip. In 1990, while living in North Andover, Massachusetts, Weste was co-inventor with Terman, Judson Leonard and others of a configurable digital signal processor for decoding MAC television signals, assigned to North American Philips. He co-authored conference papers on a CMOS RAMDAC with a built-in signal processor that expanded an 8-bit frame buffer's palette to over 700,000 colours (1990), and on a single-chip video ghost canceller with 180 programmable filter taps (1992).

=== Macquarie University and Radiata ===
Weste returned to Australia in 1995 to join Macquarie University, where he was a professor of microelectronics. The post was mainly in research, supervising postgraduate students and contract engineers on VLSI for wireless communications. With David Skellern, head of Macquarie's electronics department, and researchers at CSIRO, he worked on high-speed wireless LANs using radio-transmitting microchips. In 1997–1998 the group described a working prototype of a 5 GHz wireless LAN aimed at data rates above 25 Mbit/s in the presence of multipath interference, and discussed the VLSI design of orthogonal frequency-division multiplexing (OFDM) systems.

In 1997 Weste and Skellern founded Radiata Communications in Sydney to commercialise the technology; some accounts also name Terence Percival as a co-founder. Weste was a director of the company and, from 1998, its vice-president of engineering, with responsibility for developing the two-chip 802.11a chipset; he also co-designed the radio-frequency chip and analog circuits on the modem chip. The team's single-chip 802.11a physical-layer modem, with integrated analog-to-digital and digital-to-analog converters, was presented at the 2001 International Solid-State Circuits Conference. Radiata, which had backing from Cisco and Broadcom, demonstrated the world's first IEEE 802.11a chipset in September 2000: a baseband processor and a radio chip for the 54 Mbit/s standard in the unlicensed 5 GHz band. On 13 November 2000 Cisco, which already held an 11 per cent stake, agreed to buy the 53-employee company for Cisco stock worth about US$295 million, folding it into a new Wireless Networking Business Unit. Macquarie University and CSIRO, as patent holders, were to receive royalties; some in Australia's venture capital industry criticised the sale as "selling off the Australian farm". The Pearcey Foundation later described the trade sale as a benchmark for Australia's information and communications technology sector.

=== Cisco and NHEW R&D ===
After the acquisition Weste moved to the United States to work for Cisco. As director of engineering in its Wireless Networking Business Unit until 2003 he first saw the Radiata chipset into manufacture and then worked on future products, advising on the second-generation chipset and designing analog parts of its modem chip. Between 2003 and 2009 nine US patents naming him as an inventor were granted to Cisco's Australian wireless subsidiary and to Cisco Technology, covering single-chip CMOS 802.11a transceivers, frequency synthesisers, the tuning of on-chip oscillators, the reduction of oscillator pulling, and diversity transceivers.

In 2003 he founded NHEW R&D Pty Ltd in Sydney, of which he is director. He led GLIMMR (Gigabit Low-cost Integrated Millimeter-wave Radio), a project funded from 2005 by an Australian Research Council Linkage grant for millimetre-wave communication systems for consumer applications, with NHEW R&D as an industry partner alongside Macquarie University and the University of Adelaide; it aimed at a single-chip 60 GHz transceiver with an integrated antenna and produced silicon-germanium test chips. Patents granted to NHEW R&D in 2009 and 2012 describe forming millimetre-wave antennas from vertical bond wires in conventional integrated-circuit packages. Through NHEW R&D he was also a co-founder of and angel investor in Emotiv Systems, a developer of brain-wave interfaces for computer games; in 2007 MIT Technology Review named him, as a former Bell Labs chip engineer, one of the company's heads of research. He was an investor in and board member of G2 Microsystems, a maker of active RFID tags, and an angel investor in and board member of Avega Systems, a developer of Wi-Fi audio systems. He has been an adjunct professor at Macquarie University and the University of Adelaide. He chaired AusIndustry's Commercial Ready IT&T committee and its Industry Research and Development Board, mentored technology start-ups, and supported research through Australian Research Council linkage projects.

In early 2010 Weste, Bas Scheffers and Rowan Willson founded OzRunways, an Adelaide company that released Australia's first home-grown electronic flight bag for the iPad in December 2010. He chaired OzRunways' board from 2011 to 2025 and wrote the core customer-facing interface and tools of its electronic flight bag. By 2024 it had more than 22,000 subscribers, and that February Boeing bought it and merged it into its ForeFlight business.

=== Morse Micro ===
Weste was one of the early recruits to Morse Micro, a Sydney start-up building chips for IEEE 802.11ah (Wi-Fi HaLow), a long-range, low-power form of Wi-Fi for the Internet of things. As a Fellow of the company from 2016 to 2024 he designed the core digital signal processing for its 802.11ah physical layer and worked on its test and production chips, including the MM6108 and MM8108, and on field applications engineering. The Wi-Fi Alliance listed him in 2022 as Morse Micro's vice-president of engineering. That year he reported tests of Wi-Fi HaLow on two farms in southern Australia, where line-of-sight links reached about 2.1 km.

=== Atto Devices and later ventures ===
In 2024 Weste, Jeremy Hallett and Mike Boers co-founded Atto Devices, which designs hardware platforms and custom silicon chips. In November 2024 Macquarie University opened its Silicon Platforms Lab in partnership with the company, which is co-located on campus as the lab's main route to commercialising its research; Weste and David Skellern serve as the lab's mentors and advisers.

From 2025 Weste was chief executive of WuLu Networks, which developed long-range Wi-Fi HaLow products; in April 2026 it was merged into Mulgachips Pty Ltd, trading as Mulga Mesh, of which he is chief executive. Mulga Mesh sells long-range wireless networking for farms, conservation areas and commercial sites. He is also chief executive of Sensary, a University of New South Wales start-up working on reusable sensors.

== Books ==
Principles of CMOS VLSI Design has been a standard text on integrated-circuit design since 1985. The first two editions were written with Kamran Eshraghian; from the third edition, retitled CMOS VLSI Design: A Circuits and Systems Perspective, his co-author has been David Money Harris. The fourth edition was translated into Greek in 2011 and into Japanese, in two volumes, in 2014; the book has also been translated into Chinese.

- Weste, Neil H. E.; Eshraghian, Kamran (1985). Principles of CMOS VLSI Design: A Systems Perspective. VLSI Systems Series. Reading, Massachusetts: Addison-Wesley. ISBN 0-201-08222-5.
- Weste, Neil H. E.; Eshraghian, Kamran (1993). Principles of CMOS VLSI Design: A Systems Perspective (2nd ed.). Addison-Wesley. ISBN 0-201-53376-6.
- Weste, Neil H. E.; Harris, David (2005). CMOS VLSI Design: A Circuits and Systems Perspective (3rd ed.). Boston: Pearson Addison-Wesley. ISBN 0-321-14901-7.
- Weste, Neil H. E.; Harris, David Money (2010). CMOS VLSI Design: A Circuits and Systems Perspective (4th ed.). Boston: Pearson Addison-Wesley. ISBN 978-0-321-54774-3. Reissued by Pearson in 2022 (ISBN 978-0-13-798107-6).

== Patents ==
Weste is named as inventor on at least fifteen granted United States patents, including:

Year granted	US patent	Title	Assignee	Ref.
1983	4,384,273	Time warp signal recognition processor for matching signal patterns (with Bryan Ackland and David Burr)	Bell Telephone Laboratories	
1983	4,412,313	Random access memory system having high-speed serial data paths	Bell Telephone Laboratories	
1985	4,509,187	Time warp signal recognition processor using recirculating and/or reduced array of processor cells	AT&T Bell Laboratories	
1991	5,034,907	Dynamically configurable signal processor and processor arrangement	North American Philips	
2003	6,512,419	Method and apparatus to tune and calibrate an on-chip oscillator in a wireless transceiver chip	Cisco Systems Wireless Networking (Australia)	
2003	6,665,339	Method and apparatus for reducing oscillator pull in a CMOS wireless transceiver integrated circuit	Cisco Systems Wireless Networking (Australia)	
2004	6,686,804	Frequency synthesizer using a VCO having a controllable operating point, and calibration and tuning thereof (with Andrew Adams and Stephen Avery)	Cisco Systems Wireless Networking (Australia)	
2006	7,110,381	Diversity transceiver for a wireless local area network	Cisco Systems Wireless Networking (Australia)	
2007	7,164,651	Wireless computer network including a mobile appliance containing a single chip transceiver (with Andrew Adams, Philip Ryan, John O'Sullivan, David Skellern and Richard Keaney)	Cisco Systems Wireless Networking (Australia)	
2009	7,586,193	Mm-wave antenna using conventional IC packaging	NHEW R&D	
2012	8,087,155	Method of forming an integrated circuit with mm-wave antennas using conventional IC packaging	NHEW R&D	

== Public engagement ==
On 30 September 2020 Weste spoke at an online Pearcey Foundation "conversation", The history and future of Wi-Fi: from Radiata to Morse Micro to Beyond!, moderated by the foundation's chair, Wayne Fitzsimmons; it covered the CSIRO wireless LAN work of the early 1990s, the spin-out of Radiata, its two-chip CMOS 802.11a implementation, and the future of microelectronics and innovation in Australia. In January 2021 he was Wollondilly Shire's Australia Day Ambassador. He has written for the Wi-Fi Alliance's blog about Wi-Fi HaLow.

== Editorial and professional service ==
Weste was an elected member of the Administrative Committee of the IEEE Solid-State Circuits Society from 1998 to 2004, and served on the technical programme committees of the IEEE Custom Integrated Circuits Conference (1993–1999) and the Design Automation Conference (1996–2000). He gave keynote or invited talks at Microelectronics '89 in Brisbane and VLSI '89 in Munich, a plenary talk on CAD at the 1994 IEEE International Conference on Computer Design, and a keynote at ASP-DAC 1997 in Japan.

== Teaching and supervision ==
At Macquarie University Weste was principal supervisor of Michael Boers, whose 2015 doctoral thesis was on 60 GHz silicon transmitters. His other doctoral students have included Jothy Rosenberg at Duke University, Jeffrey Harrison and James Howarth at Macquarie, and Ivan Lu and Pasindu Aluthwala at the University of New South Wales.

== Awards and honours ==
Year	Award or honour	Awarding body	Ref.
1974	Prize for best final-year electrical engineering project	Electricity Trust of South Australia	
1978	Artwork award, for colour graphics displays of IC mask layouts	Design Automation Conference	
1981	Best paper award, for "Virtual grid symbolic layout"	Design Automation Conference	
1996	Fellow of the IEEE	Institute of Electrical and Electronics Engineers	
2004	Inaugural inductee, Innovators Hall of Fame	Macquarie University	
2006	Fellow (FTSE)	Australian Academy of Technological Sciences and Engineering	
2008	Pearcey Hall of Fame	Pearcey Foundation	
2010	Clunies Ross Award (jointly with David Skellern), for founding Radiata Communications	Australian Academy of Technological Sciences and Engineering	
2015	Doctor of Engineering honoris causa	University of Adelaide	
2021	NSW nominee, Senior Australian of the Year	National Australia Day Council	

He has also received a Technical Communication Award from Computer Design magazine.

== Selected publications ==
- Weste, N.; Mavor, J. (1977). "M.O.S.T. amplifiers for performing peripheral integrated-circuit functions". IEE Journal on Electronic Circuits and Systems. 1 (5): 165–172. doi:10.1049/ij-ecs.1977.0025.
- Weste, N. (1978). A color graphics system for IC mask design and analysis. 15th Design Automation Conference. Las Vegas. pp. 199–205. doi:10.1109/DAC.1978.1585170.
- Weste, Neil H. E. (1981). "MULGA – an interactive symbolic layout system for the design of integrated circuits". Bell System Technical Journal. 60 (6): 823–857. doi:10.1002/j.1538-7305.1981.tb03383.x.
- Ackland, Bryan D.; Weste, Neil H. (1981). "The edge flag algorithm – a fill method for raster scan displays". IEEE Transactions on Computers. C-30 (1): 41–48. doi:10.1109/TC.1981.6312155.
- Kollaritsch, Paul W.; Weste, Neil H. E. (1985). "TOPOLOGIZER: an expert system translator of transistor connectivity to symbolic cell layout". IEEE Journal of Solid-State Circuits. 20 (3): 799–804. doi:10.1109/JSSC.1985.1052385.
- Edwards, B.; Corry, A.; Weste, N.; Greenberg, C. (1992). A single chip video ghost canceller. IEEE Custom Integrated Circuits Conference. doi:10.1109/CICC.1992.591849.
- Skellern, David J.; Lee, L. H. C.; McDermott, T.; Weste, Neil H. E.; et al. (1997). "A high-speed wireless LAN". IEEE Micro. 17 (1): 40–47.
- Weste, Neil; Skellern, David J. (1998). "VLSI for OFDM". IEEE Communications Magazine. 36 (10): 127–131.
- Weste, Neil; Skellern, David; Percival, Terence (1998). VLSI for multimedia U-NII WLANs. Asia and South Pacific Design Automation Conference (ASP-DAC '98). Yokohama. pp. 585–587. doi:10.1109/ASPDAC.1998.669564.
- Ryan, Philip; Arivoli, Thangadurai; De Souza, Ludovico; Foyster, Gordon; Keaney, Richard; McDermott, Tom; Moini, Alireza; Al-Sarawi, Said; Parker, Uri; Smith, Geoff; Weste, Neil; Zyner, Greg (2001). A single chip PHY COFDM modem for IEEE 802.11a with integrated ADCs and DACs. IEEE International Solid-State Circuits Conference (ISSCC 2001). pp. 338–339. doi:10.1109/ISSCC.2001.912664.
- Harrison, Jeffrey; Weste, Neil (2003). A 500 MHz CMOS anti-alias filter using feed-forward op-amps with local common-mode feedback. IEEE International Solid-State Circuits Conference (ISSCC 2003).
