= Bogner =

Bogner is a German occupational surname meaning a bowman or a bow-maker. . Notable people with the surname include:

- Josef Bogner (1939–2020), German botanist known by the standard botanical author abbreviation Bogner
- Juliane Bogner-Strauß, Austrian molecular biologist, biochemist and politician
- Kenneth Bogner (born 1987), American politician
- Maria Bogner, German fashion designer
- Norman Bogner (1935–2022), American novelist
- Peter Bogner (art historian) (born 1963), Austrian art historian
- Peter Bogner (businessman) (born 1964), German-American businessman
- Reinhold Bogner, founder of Bogner Amplification
- Robert Eugene Bogner (born 1934), Australian electrical engineer
- Sebastian Bogner (born 1991), German chess grandmaster
- Tobias Bogner (born 1990), German ski jumper
- Willy Bogner Sr. (1909–1977), German Nordic skier
- Willy Bogner Jr. (born 1942), German fashion designer and alpine ski racer

== See also ==
- "Bogner", a 1993 song by musicians Larry Carlton and the late Terry McMillan from the Renegade Gentleman album.
- Bognor (disambiguation)
