= Clunies Ross Award =

Australian award for applied science and technology

- Description: Application of science and technology for the benefit of Australia
- Sponsored by: Australian Academy of Technological Sciences and Engineering
- Country: Australia
- First award: 1991
- Currently held by: Lei Zhang and Andrew Harris (2025)
- Website: www.atse.org.au/programs-and-awards/awards/clunies-ross-awards/

The Clunies Ross Award, known since 2023 as the Clunies Ross Technology Innovation Award, is an annual award of the Australian Academy of Technological Sciences and Engineering (ATSE). It recognises individuals or small teams who have applied science, technology and engineering for the economic, social or environmental benefit of Australia. The award was established in 1991 by the Ian Clunies Ross Memorial Foundation as the Clunies Ross National Science and Technology Award, and has been administered by ATSE since 2002. It is named after Sir Ian Clunies Ross, the first chairman of CSIRO.

== History ==
Sir Ian Clunies Ross (22 February 1899 – 20 June 1959) was a veterinary scientist and parasitologist. He was the foundation chief of the Council for Scientific and Industrial Research's Division of Animal Health, and became chairman of CSIRO in 1949.

The Ian Clunies Ross Memorial Foundation was set up in 1959 to perpetuate his memory and to promote science and technology in Australia's interest. It established the awards in 1991. In November 2002 the Foundation was brought under ATSE, and the award became the ATSE Clunies Ross Award; the Foundation was disbanded in 2004. Until 2015 there was no fixed number of awards, and several were presented each year; 74 people had been recognised by 2003. At that time each recipient received a ten-ounce silver medal bearing the portrait of Clunies Ross on one side and a brolga, his favourite bird, on the reverse.

A Lifetime Achievement Award was first presented by the Foundation in 1999 and was given occasionally until 2015, to people who had made a significant impact in their profession over a sustained period. From 2016 to 2022 the award was presented in three categories: Entrepreneur of the Year, Innovation, and Knowledge Commercialisation. In 2023 the awards were renamed the Clunies Ross Technology Innovation Awards, and a single award has since been presented, jointly in some years. The award is presented at the Academy's annual awards dinner, held in recent years in October.

== Selection ==
Nominees must have made a significant contribution to industry, the community or the environment through science, technology and engineering, providing economic, social or environmental benefit to Australia. Nominations must show evidence of the outcomes and impact of the innovation in Australia, and of the nominee's work in promoting innovation, raising community awareness of technology and mentoring the next generation of innovators. Nominees may be entrepreneurs, researchers or developers working in a publicly funded research organisation, a university or a private company, and the award is open to individuals or teams of up to three people.

== Recipients ==
For 1991–2015 the field of each award is as described by ATSE. From 2016 the award category is given.

Clunies Ross Award recipients
Year	Recipient(s)	Field or category	Ref.
1991	John Gladstones	Plant breeding	
1991	Ernest Dawes	Scientific equipment	
1991	Paul Trainor	Medical equipment	
1991	Ralph Sarich	Automotive engineering	
1991	Donald Metcalf	Medical research	
1991	Graeme Jameson	Mineral processing	
1991	Mike Rickard	Veterinary science	
1992	Robert Becher	Mineral processing	
1992	Ewen Tyler	Diamond exploration	
1992	Graeme Clark	Treatment of deafness	
1992	Michael Penny	Airborne laser mapping	
1992	Susan Serjeantson	Genetics and medical science	
1993	Geoffrey Grigg	Biotechnology	
1993	Robert Henzell	Plant breeding	
1993	Roy Woodall	Mineral exploration	
1993	Tony Priestley	Waste treatment	
1993	Ian Taylor	Reconstructive surgery	
1994	Frank Honey	Remote sensing technology	
1994	Martin Cole	Smoke detection systems	
1994	John Brockwell	Agricultural research	
1994	John Innes	Iron ore processing	
1994	David Solomon	Polymer chemistry	
1994	Martin Green	Photovoltaic research	
1995	Bruce Thomas	Antenna design and construction	
1995	John Floyd	Metallurgy	
1995	Robin Bedding	Nematology	
1995	William Compston	Earth sciences	
1995	Kevin Inkster	Entrepreneurship	
1995	Peter Spradbrow (Note: Spelled "Spadrow" in ATSE's list; the Encyclopedia of Australian Science and Innovation gives Peter Bryan Spradbrow.)	Veterinary science	
1997	John Hopkinson	Plant breeding	
1997	Robert Hobbs	Metallurgy	
1997	Allan Roy	Aluminium smelting	
1997	Denis Hanley	Membrane filtration technology	
1997	Jörg Imberger	Environmental engineering	
1998	Kevin Whithear	Veterinary science	
1998	Ian Holmes	Medical virology	
1998	Ralph Holmes	Bulk sampling techniques	
1998	Ian Croser	Communications technology	
1998	Ruth Bishop	Public health	
1999	Rahmi Akçelik	Traffic software design	
1999	Bruce Walker	Appropriate technology	
1999	Frank Jorgensen	Smelting technology	
1999	Jane Watson	Statistical literacy	
1999	Andrew Martin	Microwave radio communication	
1999	Sam Luxton	Air-conditioning technology	
1999	Gustav Nossal	Lifetime Achievement Award	
2000	Mark O'Brien	Surgery	
2000	Bill Mathew	Metallurgy	
2000	Robert Clifford and Phillip Hercus	Marine engineering	
2000	Wen-Yang Wu	Organic chemistry	
2000	Richard Drew	Entomology	
2001	Grahame Webb	Reptilian biology and conservation	
2001	John Cannon	Mathematics and computer science	
2001	Gordon Kennett	Hydraulic engineering	
2001	Nui Wang	Automotive engineering	
2001	Trevor Bridle	Waste treatment technology	
2001	Barry Marshall	Helicobacter research	
2001	Phillip Law	Lifetime Achievement Award	
2001	Ralph Slatyer	Lifetime Achievement Award	
2002	Edwin van Leeuwen	Airborne gravity mapping	
2002	Ted Maddess	Optical technology	
2002	David Burton	Medical diagnostic equipment	
2002	Sandy Gray	Mineral processing	
2002	Eric Reynolds	Dental health research	
2002	John Irwin	Plant production technology	
2002	Frank Fenner	Lifetime Achievement Award	
2003	Ahmad Shayan	Building and construction	
2003	David Boger	Non-Newtonian fluids	
2003	Ron Grey	Scientific equipment	
2003	Stephen Elliott	Water treatment technology	
2003	David Doddrell	Magnetic resonance technology	
2003	David Blair	Physics and astronomy	
2003	Jennie Brand-Miller	Human nutrition	
2004	Gregory Roger	Medical innovation and engineering	
2004	Ian Grey	Mineral chemistry (Note: Listed by ATSE as "Ministry Chemistry". CSIROpedia describes the award as recognising his work on the weathering and processing of mineral sands.)	
2004	Jeff Rowlands	Mining technology	
2004	John Ballard	Biochemical drug development	
2004	Robert Evans	Forest products research	
2004	Mal Crozier	Defence engineering	
2005	Alan Finkel	Biomedical clamp amplifiers	
2005	Alex Zelinsky	Robotics and computer vision	
2005	Fiona Wood and Marie Stoner	Skin tissue engineering	
2005	Robert Banks	Animal genetic analysis	
2005	Gerald Van Erp	Fibre-reinforced composites	
2005	Joe Baker	Lifetime Achievement Award	
2006	Danny Llewellyn, Gary Fitt and Greg Constable	Biotechnology and entomology	
2006	Dean Cameron	Water treatment	
2006	Gerald Roach	Metallurgy	
2006	Ron Sacks-Davis	Information technology	
2006	John De Laeter	Lifetime Achievement Award	
2007	Peter Farrell	Sleep apnoea	
2007	Martin Harris and Peter Delaney	Confocal microscopy	
2007	Arthur Lowery	Photonics	
2007	Ian Frazer	Cervical cancer research	
2007	Paul Gottlieb	Mineralogical analysis	
2007	Nancy Millis	Lifetime Achievement Award	
2008	David Noon	Slope stability radar	
2008	Colin Sullivan	Sleep apnoea treatment	
2008	Iven Mareels	Water-saving technologies	
2008	Stuart Wenham	Silicon solar cell technology	
2008	Raymond Stalker	Lifetime Achievement Award	
2009	Chris Nichol	Mobile phone technology	
2009	John Hullett, Antonio Cantoni and Zigmantas Budrikis	Internet congestion control	
2009	Alan Langworthy	Remote renewable power	
2009	Hugh Durrant-Whyte	Robotics	
2009	John Hopwood	Lysosomal disease treatment	
2009	John Ralston	Lifetime Achievement Award	
2010	John Parker	Hearing implant technology	
2010	Graham Daniels, John Deane, John O'Sullivan, Diethelm Ostry and Terence Percival	Wireless LAN (Wi-Fi) technology	
2010	David Skellern and Neil H. E. Weste	Microelectronics	
2010	Tim St Pierre	Measurement of liver iron	
2010	Andrew Jessett	Mining technology	
2010	John Boldeman	Lifetime Achievement Award	
2011	John Ness		
2011	Nicholas Gough, Antony Burgess and Ashley Dunn		
2011	John Clout	Processing of low-grade iron ore	
2011	Bruce Candy	Metal detection	
2011	Roy Woodall	Lifetime Achievement Award	
2012	Gideon Chitombo	Rock blasting and caving methods in mining	
2012	Peter Blamey	Cochlear implants and hearing aids	
2012	Stuart Crozier	Magnetic resonance imaging	
2012	William Tyree	Lifetime Achievement Award	
2013	Anthony Radford, James Rothel, Paul Wood and Stephen Jones	Tuberculosis diagnostics	
2013	Ian Croser	Radar and communications	
2013	Simon Poole and Steven Frisken	Optical telecommunications technology	
2014	Ravi Ravitharan, Peter Mutton and Graham Tew	Railway engineering	
2014	Kevin Galvin	Mineral processing	
2014	Ezio Rizzardo, Graeme Moad and San Thang	Polymer chemistry	
2014	Eugene Ivanov and Michael Tobar (Note: Not included in ATSE's list of historical winners, but reported among the 2014 recipients by contemporary sources.)	Low-noise oscillators	
2014	John Nutt	Lifetime Achievement Award	
2015	Leigh Ward		
2015	Zhiguo Yuan		
2015	Catherine Foley and Keith Leslie	Superconducting technologies for mineral exploration	
2015	Jim Patrick	Lifetime Achievement Award	
2016	Elaine Saunders	Entrepreneur of the Year	
2016	Peter Murphy	Innovation	
2016	Maree Smith	Knowledge Commercialisation	
2017	Andrew Wilks	Entrepreneur of the Year	
2017	Mike Xie	Innovation	
2017	Darryn Smart	Knowledge Commercialisation	
2018	Erol Harvey	Entrepreneur of the Year	
2018	Jim Aylward	Innovation	
2018	David Huang (Note: Recognised with collaborators Peter Czabotar, Guillaume Lessene and Andrew Roberts for the development of venetoclax.)	Knowledge Commercialisation	
2019	Jane Oppenheim	Entrepreneur of the Year	
2019	Thorsten Trupke and Robert Bardos	Innovation	
2019	Anthony Weiss	Knowledge Commercialisation	
2020	Mark Sullivan	Entrepreneur of the Year	
2020	Alison Todd and Elisa Mokany	Innovation	
2020	Grant Douglas	Knowledge Commercialisation	
2021	Leanne Kemp	Entrepreneur of the Year	
2021	Alan Wong	Innovation	
2021	Anne Voss, Tim Thomas and Jonathan Baell	Knowledge Commercialisation	
2022	Saeid Nahavandi	Entrepreneur of the Year	
2022	Veena Sahajwalla	Innovation	
2022	Forbes McGain and Jason Monty	Knowledge Commercialisation	
2023	James Tickner	Technology Innovation	
2024	Andrew Blakers	Technology Innovation	
2025	Lei Zhang	Technology Innovation	
2025	Andrew Harris	Technology Innovation	

== See also ==
- List of engineering awards
