= Bognor (disambiguation) =

Bognor may refer to:

== Places ==
- Bognor Regis, a town in Sussex, England simply called Bognor from 680 to 1930
  - Bognor Regis Town F.C., its football club
- Bognor, Ontario, part of Meaford, Ontario, Canada
- Bognor Reef
- RAF Bognor

== Other ==
- Bognor (TV series), a British television series from 1981

== See also ==
- Bogner
