= Attila Brungs =

Australian academic

Attila Brungs AO FTSE FRSN

10th Vice Chancellor and President of the University of New South Wales
- Incumbent
- Assumed office 31 January 2022
- Chancellor: David Gonski
- Preceded by: Ian Jacobs

4th Vice Chancellor and President of the University of Technology Sydney
- In office July 2014 – October 2021
- Chancellor: Vicki Sara; Brian Wilson; Catherine Livingstone
- Preceded by: R. E. Milbourne
- Succeeded by: Andrew Parfitt

Personal details
- Born: Australia
- Education: University of New South Wales (BSc); New College, Oxford (DPhil)
- Scientific career
- Fields: Inorganic chemistry
- Thesis: Transition Metal Carbides as Catalysts for Methane Reforming (1998)
- Doctoral advisor: Malcolm Green

Attila Joseph Brungs is the vice-chancellor and president of the University of New South Wales (UNSW) in Australia. He was appointed to the role in January 2022. Prior to this role, he was the vice-chancellor and president of the University of Technology Sydney (UTS); a role that he held from July 2014 to October 2021.

== Career ==
Brungs has been a researcher in both industry and academia, with interests in the area of heterogeneous catalysis. Brungs was elected a Fellow of the Royal Society of New South Wales in 2014 and was elected Fellow of the Australian Academy of Technology and Engineering in 2018. In 2024, he was awarded the Chaikin Medal from ATSE. His oration was titled Progress for All: Hard knowledge and the quest for public good.

Prior to his appointment as deputy vice-chancellor (research) at UTS in September 2009, Brungs was general manager of Science Investment, Strategy and Performance at CSIRO. His role incorporated the determination of broad research direction and resource allocation, performance monitoring of CSIRO research programs, including its flagship programs, and the development and implementation of organisational strategy.

Before joining CSIRO in 2002, Brungs was a senior manager at McKinsey and Co, managing teams in North America, Asia, New Zealand and Australia.

Brungs has served on boards, committees, working groups and advisory bodies across government, education and industry. These have included serving on the NSW Innovation and Productivity Council; and chairperson, Australian Technology Network.

Brungs was appointed an Officer of the Order of Australia in the 2026 King's Birthday Honours in recognition of "distinguished service to tertiary education leadership, to research and innovation, and to social justice and equity ". Brungs has written and spoken extensively for broad-based productivity improvements so all sectors of Australian society share in benefits from AI economic transformation, instead of being locked out of opportunity through entrenched inequity.

== Education ==
Brungs is a Rhodes Scholar, with a doctorate in inorganic chemistry from Oxford University, and a recipient of the University Medal in Industrial Chemistry from UNSW. He is an alumnus of Saint Ignatius' College, Riverview in Sydney.

Academic offices
Preceded by RE Milbourne	4th Vice-Chancellor of the University of Technology Sydney; 2014–2021	Succeeded by Andrew Parfitt
Preceded by Ian Jacobs	10th Vice-Chancellor and President of the University of New South Wales; 2021–	Incumbent
