= Nicholson–Bailey model =

The Nicholson–Bailey model was developed in the 1930s to describe the population dynamics of a coupled host-parasitoid system.^{a} It is named after Alexander John Nicholson and Victor Albert Bailey. Host-parasite and prey-predator systems can also be represented with the Nicholson-Bailey model. The model is closely related to the Lotka–Volterra model, which describes the dynamics of antagonistic populations (preys and predators) using differential equations.

The model uses (discrete time) difference equations to describe the population growth of host-parasite populations. The model assumes that parasitoids search for hosts at random, and that both parasitoids and hosts are assumed to be distributed in a non-contiguous ("clumped") fashion in the environment. In its original form, the model does not allow for stable coexistence. Subsequent refinements of the model, notably adding density dependence on several terms, allowed this coexistence to happen.

== Equations ==
=== Derivation ===
The model is defined in discrete time. It is usually expressed as

$\begin{array}{rcl} H_{t+1} & = & k H_t e^{-a P_t} \\ P_{t+1} & = & c H_t \left ( 1-e^{-aP_t} \right ) \end{array}$

with H the population size of the host, P the population size of the parasitoid, k the reproductive rate of the host, a the searching efficiency of the parasitoid, and c the average number of viable eggs that a parasitoid lays on a single host.

This model can be explained based on probability. $e^{-a P_t}$ is the probability that the host will survive $P_t$ predators; whereas $1 - e^{-a P_t}$ is that they will not, bearing in mind the parasitoid eventually will hatch into larva and escape.

=== Analysis of the Nicholson–Bailey model ===
When $0 < k < 1$, $(\bar H, \bar P) = (0,0)$ is the unique non-negative fixed point and all non-negative solutions converge to $(0,0)$. When $k = 1$, all non-negative solutions lie on level curves of the function $z = H + P - \text{ln}(P)$ and converge to a fixed point on the $P$-axis. When $k > 1$, this system admits one unstable positive fixed point, at

$\begin{array}{rcl} \bar H & = & \frac{k\, \text{ln}(k)}{(k-1)\, ac} \\ \bar P & = & \frac{\text{ln}(k)}{a} \end{array}.$

It has been proven that all positive solutions whose initial conditions are not equal to $(\bar H, \bar P)$ are unbounded and exhibit oscillations with infinitely increasing amplitude.

=== Variations ===
Density dependence can be added to the model, by assuming that the growth rate of the host decreases at high abundances. The equation for the parasitoid is unchanged, and the equation for the host is modified:

$\begin{array}{rcl} H_{t+1} & = & H_t e^{r(1-H_t/K)}e^{-a P_t} \\ P_{t+1} & = & c H_t \left ( 1-e^{-aP_t} \right ) \end{array}$

The host rate of increase k is replaced by r, which becomes negative when the host population density reaches K.

== See also ==
- Lotka–Volterra inter-specific competition equations
- Population dynamics

== Notes ==
- ^a Parasitoids encompass insects that place their ova inside the eggs or larva of other creatures (generally other insects as well).
