= Victor Albert Bailey =

British-Australian physicist

Victor Bailey
- Born: 18 December 1895; Alexandria, Egypt
- Died: 7 December 1964 (aged 68); Geneva, Switzerland
- Education: Oxford University
- Known for: Ionospheric physics Nicholson–Bailey model
- Awards: Walter Burfitt Prize (1955)
- Scientific career
- Fields: Physicist
- Workplaces: Oxford University; University of Sydney
- Doctoral advisor: John Sealy Edward Townsend
- Notable students: Ronald Ernest Aitchison

Victor Albert Bailey (18 December 1895 – 7 December 1964) was a British-Australian physicist. The eldest of four surviving children of William Henry Bailey, a British Army engineer, and his wife Suzana (née Lazarus), an expatriate Romanian linguist, Bailey is notable for his work in ionospheric physics and population dynamics.

== Biography ==
Bailey read physics at The Queen's College, University of Oxford, from which he graduated with a Bachelor of Arts in 1919. Thereafter, he read for a Doctorate of Philosophy (D.Phil.) at Queen's College, under the supervision of John Sealy Edward Townsend, the Wykeham Professor of Physics and Fellow of New College, Oxford. His D.Phil. thesis was entitled The Diffusion of Ions in Gases, and he graduated in 1923.

Bailey was employed as a demonstrator in the Electrical Laboratory at Oxford and occasional lecturer, at Queen's College, Oxford.

In 1924, he was appointed as associate professor of physics at the University of Sydney. Bailey was subsequently promoted to Professor of Experimental Physics (1936–52) and Research Professor (1953–60).

Bailey married Joyce Hewitt in 1934. Their older son, John Maxwell Bailey, also became a physicist.

== Awards ==
- 1951: T. K. Sidey Medal, awarded by the Royal Society of New Zealand for outstanding scientific research.
- 1955: Fellow of the Australian Academy of Science (FAA)
- 1955: Walter Burfitt Prize and A.D. Olle Award received from Royal Society of New South Wales
