= Morse Micro =

Australian WiFi HaLow microprocessor company

Morse Micro Pty. Ltd.
- Type: Private
- Industry: Wi-Fi
- Founded: 2016; 10 years ago Sydney, Australia
- Founders: Michael de Nil; Andrew Terry
- Headquarters: Sydney, Australia
- Key people: Michael de Nil (CEO); Andrew Terry (CTO); Marin Peplinksi (CPO); Neil Weste (Fellow); David Goodall (VP Standards); Ray Stata (board member); Mike Nicholls (board member)
- Products: Wi-Fi HaLow chips
- Website: www.morsemicro.com

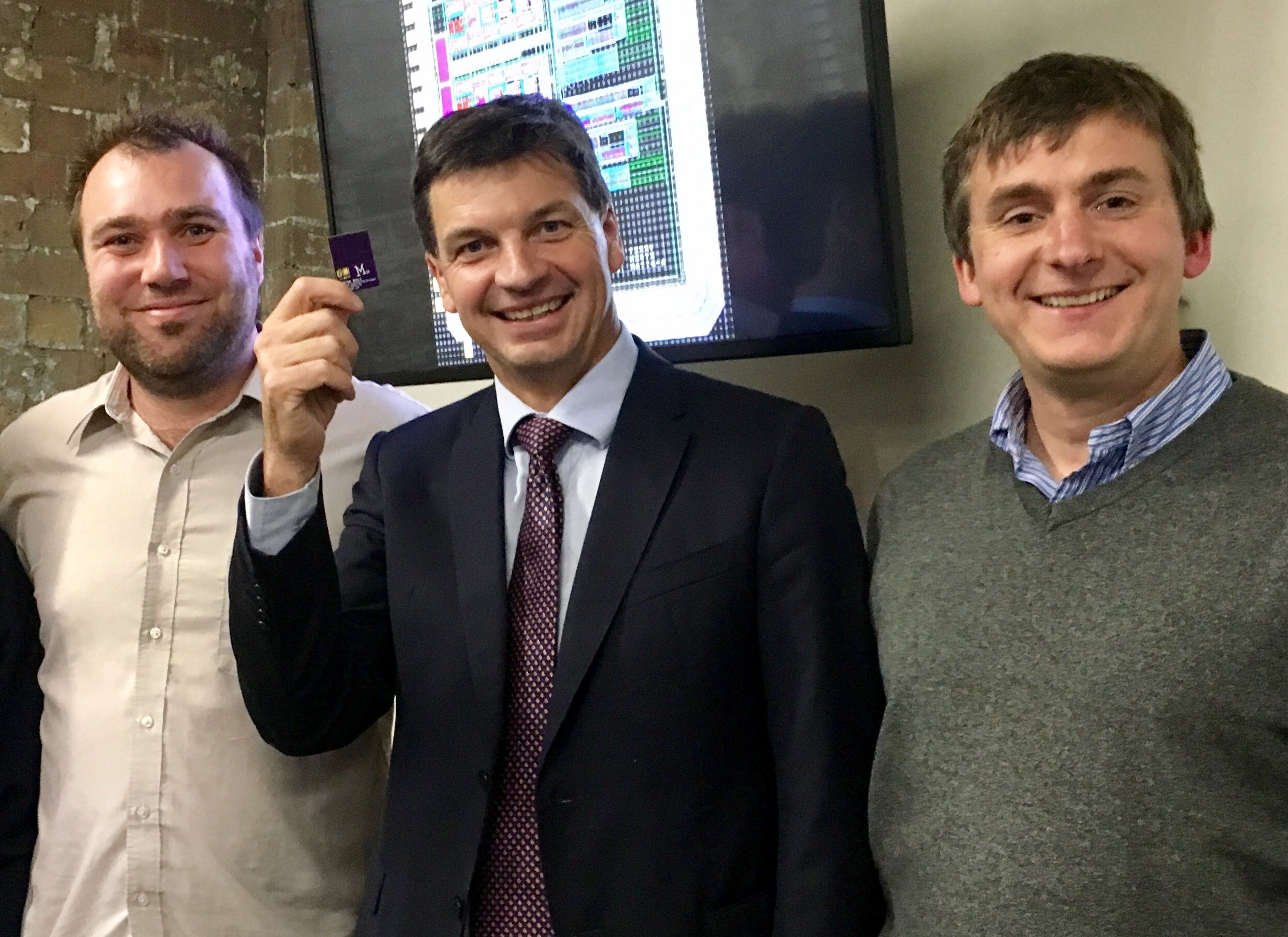
Founder Michael de Nil, Minister Angus Taylor and co-founder Andrew Terry, at Morse Micro offices in Picton, south of Sydney, soon after winning their seed funding grant in 2017. Taylor holds a prototype of their Wi-Fi HaLow chip.

Morse Micro is a Sydney-based developer of Wi-Fi HaLow microprocessors; chips that enable high data rates, with long range and low power consumption. Amongst all Wi-Fi HaLow systems on a chip, Morse Micro processors are reported to be the smallest, fastest, longest-range with lowest-power-use.

The main application of the technology is machine-to-machine communications. With the Internet of things expected to extend to 30 billion devices by 2025, this represents a steeply growing number of users of the technology. The founders plan to be part of "expanding Wi-Fi so it can go into everything, every smoke alarm, every camera."

The firm has its global HQ in Sydney, which is also its main base for R&D, with additional centres in the United States, China, India, the United Kingdom and, from 2024, an operations centre in Taiwan. As of 2022, Morse Micro was producing more semiconductors than any other Australian-based tech company.

== Technology ==
After eight years' development, the company's Wi-Fi HaLow processor was reported to deliver 10 times the range of conventional Wi-Fi technology, and able to function for several years before needing battery change.

=== Data rates and range ===
The microprocessor allows for a range of data rates, depending on the modulation and coding scheme (MCS) used. This can be as low as 150 kilobits per second (kbit/s) using MCS 10 with BPSK modulation, to a top rate of 43.3 megabits per second (Mbit/s) using MCS 9 at 256 quadrature amplitude modulation.

The chip uses low-bandwidth wireless network protocols, operating in the 1 GHz spectrum, while providing a communications range of 1,000 metres. In one field test, researchers found the technology could sustain high speed data transmission between a device placed by the north end of Sydney Harbour Bridge and a device across the harbour at Sydney Opera House. The company claims their chip provides 10 times the range, 100 times the area and 1000 times the volume of data offered by traditional wi-fi.

=== Connectivity and energy ===
To enable networked communications between machines, a single Wi-Fi HaLow Access Point can securely connect up to 8,191 devices. Applications for the WiFi HaLow technology includes the Internet of things, which may include solutions for in the home (such as lighting, monitoring and smart door locks) and in industry (such as vehicle management, high-end security and supply chain asset tracking. Looking at its scalability, one American technical review made this assessment:

That's ample capacity to connect every LED bulb, light switch, smart door lock, motorized window shade, thermostat, smoke detector, solar panel, security camera, or any imaginable smart-home device for the foreseeable future.

Physically, the company's microchip is one-fifth the size of a traditional Wi-Fi processor. It uses very little energy, consuming a fraction of the power consumed by traditional chips, which is achieved by periodically waking and reporting. As such, the chips can operate for several years on a single coin-size battery. In 2020, the first generation of Morse Micro microchips went into production in Taiwan. The company has onshore design and fabrication of composite semiconductors in Australia, which has been assessed as a strategic capability.

As of late 2022, the market for Wi-Fi HaLow products appeared to be expanding, from those developing industrial IoT in the Japanese market which, "deploy thousands of devices in warehouses which use sensors and actuators."

Wi-Fi and Wi-Fi HaLow compared
Function	Wi-Fi 4/5/6/7 (IEEE 802.11n/ac/ax/be)	Wi-Fi HaLow (IEEE 802.11ah)
Operating frequency bands	2.4 GHz, 5 GHz, 6 GHz	Sub-1 GHz (902 to 928 MHz in U.S.)
Channel-width choices	20, 40, 80, 160, 320 MHz	1, 2, 4, 8, (16 optional) MHz
Maximum addressable stations per access point	2,007	8,191
Single-stream MCS data-rate range	6.5 to 150 Mbit/s (802.11n, Wi-Fi 4)	150 kbit/s to 86.7 Mbit/s
Typical range (compared to 802.11n at 20 MHz)	~ 100m	> 1,000m (10x range, 100x area)

== History ==
"Wi-Fi was invented over 20 years ago in Australia and over that time we have seen it go into every laptop, phone and tablet, and all of that came from people in Australia. Today we are opening it up and expanding Wi-Fi so it can go into everything, every smoke alarm, every camera." — Andrew Terry, founder, speaking to The Sydney Morning Herald in 2017

The founding partners of Morse Micro, Andrew Terry and Michael De Nil met while working for Broadcom, the largest supplier of integrated circuits for communications. De Nil said they noticed that chips designed for phones and laptops were being used for machine-to-machine communication and "that wasn't working very well." They decided to create a new kind of microprocessor, specifically for the Internet of things.

Morse Micro Pty Ltd was established as a private company, limited by guarantee, in August 2016. The founders were later joined by several significant engineers, including:

- Professor Neil Weste the founder of Radiata Networks who had created the first 802.11a Wi-Fi chip
- Dr. John O'Sullivan (engineer) radio astronomer who led the team who invented Wi-Fi at CSIRO in the 1980s
- Dr. David Goodall, a design engineer at Radiata, which created the first commercial WiFi chip

By late 2023, the company employed 180 people across Australia, the United States, China, India, UK, Singapore and Taiwan. From this point the focus of market expansion became Japan, through its Japanese investor MegaChips. Security cameras became a key application, which was recognised with the global industry award, the IoT Product of the Year, in 2022 and 2023. The Australian Financial Review reported from 2024 that Morse Micro was ameliorating for geopolitical risk by maintaining two supply chains for chips and components, one from mainland China, the other Taiwan, with assembly and warehousing in Singapore. The Singapore facility began operations in August 2023, and had produced over 2 million chips by November of that year.

== Investors ==
The Australian Government provided the founders with seed funding in 2017 as they believed Morse Micro has the "first WiFi HaLow silicon chip that securely connects smart devices over long distances." It is reported to be the best-funded Wi-Fi HaLow technology companies, with large investors from Japan, the United States and a spread of Australian retirement funds. By 15 February 2023, the company had an estimated value of US$700 million, just over A$1 billion.

=== Series A investment, 2019 ===
In May 2019, Series A funding was provided in by a suite of investors. These included the Clean Energy Innovation Fund and CSIRO Innovation Fund, part of the Australian scientific research agency credited with inventing Wi-Fi in 1997. Investment also came from American entrepreneur Ray Stata of Analog Devices, Blackbird Ventures, Main Sequence Ventures, Right Click Capital, Kim Jackson and her husband Scott Farquhar through Skip Capital, Lucy and Malcolm Turnbull; and Uniseed, the venture fund of UniSuper. This tranche totalled A$42 million.

=== Series B investment 2022 ===
By September 2022 the company had announced its Series B round of A$140 million, later extended to A$170 million, attracting intense investor interest. The investment round was led by Japanese chip design and manufacturing giant MegaChips, with further investment from its incumbent investors, which is known to include several Australian superannuation groups, such as TelstraSuper, HESTA, Hostplus and NGS (managed by Blackbird Ventures) and UniSuper (managed by Uniseed).
