= Donald H. Sinnott =

Australian engineer and academic

Don Sinnott
- Born: Donald Hugh Sinnott
- Education: Syracuse University
- Awards: M. A. Sargent Medal
- Scientific career
- Fields: Radar
- Workplaces: DST
- Doctoral advisor: Roger F. Harrington

Donald Hugh Sinnott is an Australian engineer and academic notable in the area of radar. His expertise is in applied electromagnetics, including radio and radar systems, antennas and radio propagation, signal processing and global navigation satellite systems (GPS and related systems). He played a major role in development of Australia's Jindalee over-the-horizon radar system.

== Early life and education ==
He received his PhD from Syracuse University, in 1972, under Roger F. Harrington.

== Career and research ==
As a researcher in radio and radar technologies, he worked for many years at DST, supporting and advising Australia's Department of Defence. He played a major role in Australia's development of over-the-horizon radar, embodied in Australia's world-leading Jindalee project, before moving to senior defence management positions.

He was Chief of a number of Australia's Defence Science and Technology Group research Divisions in sensing and IT disciplines (1987–2000), the Department of Defence's Canberra-based First Assistant Secretary Science Policy (1995–1997), CEO of the Cooperative Research Centre for Sensor Signal and Information Processing and Company Board Chairman of the CRC's spin-off companies (2000–2003). He is currently a board member for the CRC on Contamination Assessment and Remediation of the Environment (CRC CARE).

He is an adjunct professor with the University of Adelaide, Australia, where he has taught and supervised higher-degree students. He's a fellow of Engineers Australia and IEEE. In 2014 he was awarded the M. A. Sargent Medal, for which the citation refers to his 'eminence and leadership' in his field.

He authored the book Radar Men: A. P. Rowe and John Strath in War and Peace, in 2016.

=== Honours and awards ===
- M. A. Sargent Medal (2014)
