= Ronald Ernest Aitchison =

Australian physicist

Ronald Aitchison
- Born: 29 December 1921; Hurstville, New South Wales, Australia
- Died: 9 March 1996 (aged 74); Sydney, Australia
- Education: University of Sydney
- Known for: Solid-state physics
- Awards: Fulbright scholarship
- Scientific career
- Fields: Physics; Electronic engineering
- Institutions: Amalgamated Wireless; University of Sydney; Bristol University; Stanford University; Macquarie University
- Academic advisors: Victor Albert Bailey
- Doctoral students: Peter Harold Cole
- Other notable students: F. J. Duarte

Ronald Ernest Aitchison (29 December 1921 – 9 March 1996) was an Australian physicist and electronics engineer who contributed to a range of fields and technologies from solid-state devices to satellite imaging. He was born in Hurstville, New South Wales, Australia on 29 December 1921.

== Career ==
From 1942 to 1945 Aitchison worked as an engineer with the Amalgamated Wireless Valve Company on the design and production of klystrons and radar magnetrons, which were new devices important to the war effort. He was also involved in work on semiconductor diodes, which were the forerunners of the revolution in electronics brought about by the advent of solid-state semiconductor components. In 1945 he joined the National Acoustic Laboratories where he worked on the design and construction of hearing aids for children.

Aitchison was appointed as senior lecturer in Communications Engineering at the University of Sydney, which was the start of his 25-year teaching experience at that institution, culminating in his appointment as associate professor. His interest in solid-state physics took him to Bristol University, UK, for a year, and he also spent a year at Stanford University, California, on a Fulbright scholarship, working at the forefront of electronics research. In 1970, he accepted an offer from Macquarie University to become the founding professor of electronics and took up the post in 1971.

== Macquarie University ==
At Macquarie Aitchison was hired as foundation professor of electronics. He taught this subject, with an emphasis on semiconductor physics, to advanced undergraduates and graduate students. In his teachings he emphasized understanding of principles over memorization of facts.

As a researcher he created a state-of-the-art electronics laboratory and led several successful projects of a highly practical nature including pioneering work on the reception of satellite weather pictures that were shown every evening in Sydney's television newscasts. In addition, he served as Head of the School of Mathematics and Physics, and as a member of Macquarie's Academic Senate.

At the School of Mathematics and Physics Aitchison became a colleague and friend of quantum physicist John Clive Ward and he was a supporter, and active participant, of the Macquarie science reform movement.

He retired 4 July 1986.

Professor Frederick Chong (Foundation Professor of Mathematics, Macquarie University, 1966–1980): "No problem was too peculiar for him. We knew that he could call on the most sophisticated of electronic devices, but he might also improvise with matchsticks, chewing gum and string! I can say that Ron Aitchison was one of the most energetic, most knowledgeable, most practical, most intelligent and most interesting persons I have ever known, and even more importantly, he was a real friend with a heart of gold and a purity of spirit unsullied by self-seeking motives."

== Achievements ==
- The scientific calculator with speech output for blind students. Aitchison's passion in his later years at Macquarie University was the development of the Speakwriter, a typewriter which enunciated the sounds of typewriter keys as they were pressed. An article written by Tony Healy in Computing Australia (1/9/86) quotes Tim Connell now working for Quantum Technology: “We saw Professor Aitchison on TV with his (talking) typewriter and realised we could do that.” Aitchison developed the talking typewriter originally to help a blind student complete a standard science course. His ideas can now be seen in many of the products available today made for people with vision impairment.
- The completion of the design, construction and commissioning of an orbiting National Oceanic and Atmospheric Administration (NOAA) satellite for remote sensing.
- The development of solid-state pulse modulators for driving hydrogen thyratrons and for replacing hydrogen thyratrons in pulsed lasers, such as high-power copper vapor lasers.
- Aitchison was a fellow of the Australian Institute of Physics, a fellow of the Institute of Physics (London), and a fellow of the IREE.
- Aitchison had an abiding passion for the rights of the consumer and was an early Council member of the Australian Consumers Association (publishers of Choice magazine) where he served as a Council member for 21 years from February 1961 until 1981, focusing particularly on rigorous testing programmes for consumer products,

== Files on talking typewriters (late 1970s) ==
University Research Bulletin (1982) written by The Australian Vice-Chancellor's Committee, outlines initial research on talking typewriters at Macquarie University, detailing the role of the head of the Talking Typewriter Research team: Professor Ron Aitchison,(Professor of Electronics)

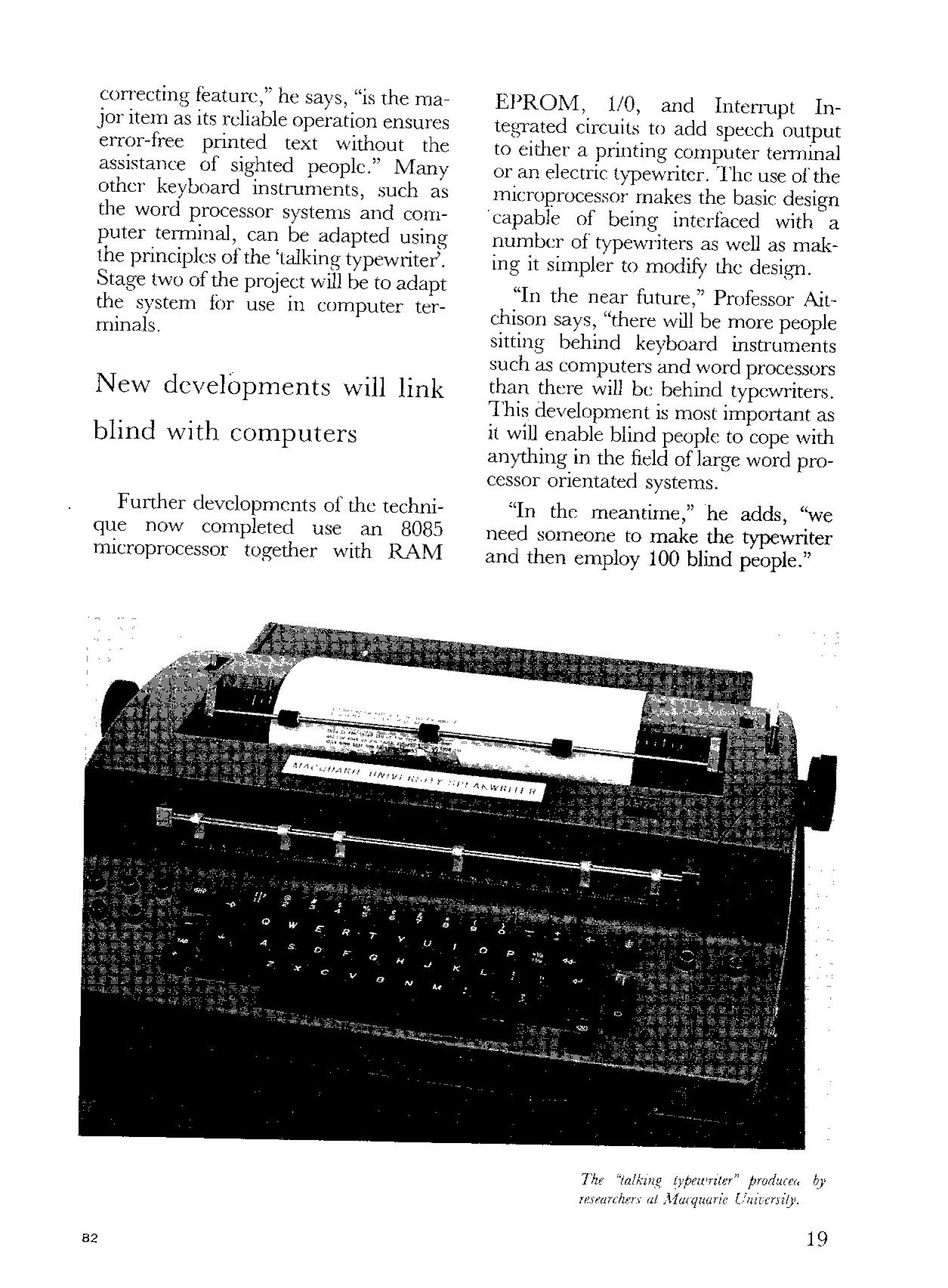
University Research Page 7

== Publications ==
Aitchison's most cited paper, according to the ISI database, is his 1954 paper on transparent semiconducting films – which is still cited to this day. Also his 1964 paper in the American Journal of Physics is notable as it is still cited today and was the first calculation of the resistance between two points on an infinite 2D mesh.

- R.E Aitchison, "The resistance mesh problem," J. Electrical & Electronics Engineering Australia, 2(2), pp. 65–67, 1982.
- T.J. Brown and R.E. Aitchison, "A microprocessor controller for a personal typewriter for visually handicapped users," IEEE Trans. Biomedical Engineering, 29(7), pp. 551–555, 1982.
- R.E. Aitchison "Satellite-receiver ground stations:low cost options,"AMIC Department of Information ISKI Seminar on Satellite Technology: the Communication Equaliser, Solo, Nov 25–30, 1984, Singapore: Asian Mass Communication Research & Information Centre1984
- R.E. Aitchison, "The calendar," Phys. Educ., 17, pp. 186–189, 1982.
- R.E. Aitchison and T.J. Brown, "A talking typewriter for the visually handicapped," J. Electrical & Electronics Engineering Australia, 1(4), pp. 288–292, 1981.
- R.E. Aitchison, "VHF field strengths for line of sight reception," Proc. Inst. Radio & Electronics Engineers Australia, 36 (7), pp. 225–231, 1975.
- R.E. Aitchison and T.J. Brown, "A high impedance amplifier for biological research," Electronic Engineering, 48(575), p. 23, 1976.
- R.E. Aitchison, "Electronic world-wide navigation systems," Monitor, 37(12), pp. 346–353, 1976.
- R.E. Aitchison, ‘‘Resistance between adjacent points of Liebman mesh,’’ American Journal of Physics 32(7), p. 566, 1964.
- R.E. Aitchison, "A high-capacitance parametric diode for use at low frequencies," IEEE Trans. MTT, 10(1), p. 91, 1962.
- R.E. Aitchison, "Suppressed zero d.c. volmeter," Journal of Scientific Instruments, 38, p. 329, 1961.
- R.E. Aitchison, "Transparent semiconducting oxide films," Australian Journal of Applied Science, 5, pp. 10–17, 1954.
- R.E. Aitchison, "Small glass spray gun," Journal of Scientific Instruments, 26, p. 245, 1949.
