= Andrew Parfitt =

Australian university administrator and engineer

Andrew Parfitt FTSE

5th Vice-Chancellor of the University of Technology Sydney
- Incumbent
- Assumed office 15 November 2021
- Chancellor: Michael Rose
- Preceded by: Attila Brungs

Personal details
- Education: University of Adelaide (BE, PhD)
- Scientific career
- Fields: Electrical engineering
- Workplaces: CRC Satellite Systems, CSIRO, Defence Science and Technology Group
- Thesis: Substrate Supported Metal Strip Antennas for Monolithically Fabricated Millimetre Wavelength Arrays (1992)
- Doctoral advisor: Peter H. Cole

Andrew James Parfitt is an Australian academic who is the 5th vice-chancellor and president of the University of Technology Sydney. He was appointed to the role in November 2021. He was previously the deputy vice-chancellor (academic) of the University of Newcastle from 2012 to 2016, and provost of the University of Technology Sydney from 2017 to 2021.

== Early life and education ==
Andrew James Parfitt graduated with a BE (Electrical and Electronic) and PhD (Electrical and Electronic Engineering) from the University of Adelaide, the latter in 1992. His PhD thesis was entitled "Substrate Supported Metal Strip Antennas for Monolithically Fabricated Millimetre Wavelength Arrays", and was overseen by Peter H. Cole. His position at Adelaide (to Senior Lecturer) was facilitated by Cole, and Parfitt never achieved the rank of Associate / Professor.

== Career ==
Parfitt was previously the CEO of CRC Satellite Systems and general manager of CSIRO space programs. In 2004, he was appointed as the director of the Institute for Telecommunications Research at the University of South Australia. He has held adjunct academic positions at the University of Adelaide, University of Sydney, and Macquarie University.

In December 2012, Parfitt was appointed as the deputy vice-chancellor (academic) of the University of Newcastle in Newcastle, New South Wales. He remained in the role until 2016, when he was appointed as the next provost of the University of Technology Sydney. He was the provost and senior vice-president of the University of Technology Sydney from 2017 to 2021.

In November 2021, he was appointed as the fifth vice-chancellor and president of the University of Technology Sydney. Parfitt's management performance, in particular his UTS restructure and staff reduction campaign, was criticised in a January 2026 article in the Australian Financial Review. Consulting firm Ernst Young has warned of risk management issues in the implementation of a large software project that he signed off on, an enterprise resource planning (ERP) system costing $77 million.

Under Parfitt's management at the University of Technology Sydney, $1.5 million was spent on leadership coaching before cutting both jobs and courses.

In late 2025, an overwhelming number of staff (95%) expressed no confidence in Parfitt's leadership in a survey conducted by the National Tertiary Education Union (NTEU).

== Other roles and activities ==
Parfitt was the chair of the Universities Admissions Centre from 2013 to 2019.

== Honours ==
Parfitt was a ministerial appointment to the Australian government's Space Industry Innovation Council from 2010 to 2012. He is a Senior Member of the Institute of Electrical and Electronics Engineers (IEEE) and a Fellow of Engineers Australia (EA). He was elected a Fellow of the Australian Academy of Technology and Engineering in 2021.

Academic offices
Preceded by Attila Brungs	5th Vice-Chancellor of the University of Technology Sydney; 2021–present	Incumbent
