= David James Skellern =

Australian electronic engineer and computer scientist

David J. Skellern
- Born: 1951 85 years old Sydney
- Education: University of Sydney
- Known for: Wireless, WLAN, Communications Technology
- Awards: Norman W. V. Hayes Medal (1980); M. A. Sargent Medal (2010); Officer (AO), Order of Australia (2012)
- Scientific career
- Fields: Electrical Engineering, Computer Science, Radio astronomy
- Workplaces: Macquarie University, University of Sydney

David Skellern is an Australian electronic engineer and computer scientist credited, along with colleagues, for the first chip-set implementation of the IEEE 802.11a wireless networking standard.

He is credited with a number of technology innovations. developed with colleagues which include John O'Sullivan, Terence Percival and Neil Weste, and in particular the first chip-set implementation of the IEEE 802.11a wireless networking standard. This innovation has been described as a revolution in world communications, allowing high speed wireless communications.

Skellern was appointed to the Order of Australia in 2012.

== Education ==
He obtained a B.Sc. University of Sydney (1972) [Pure Mathematics, Computer Science & Physics], a B.E. (Hons), Electrical Engineering, University of Sydney (1974), and a PhD, University of Sydney (1985) for a thesis on A Mapping System for Rotational Synthesis Data.

== Career ==
From 1974 to 1983, he worked in radio astronomy and taught electronics at Sydney University and Macquarie University. From 1983 to 1989 he held research and academic positions at that university's department of Electrical engineering. In 1989, he became Professor and chair of the Department of Electronics at Macquarie University.

In 1997, he co-founded Radiata, a company engaged in the commercial development of WLAN communications. The company demonstrated the world's first chip-set implementation of the 54 Mbit/s IEEE 802.11a High-Speed WLAN standard, based on the research Skellern conducted with Neil Weste in the 1990s at Macquarie University in collaboration with CSIRO. Radiata was sold to Cisco Systems in 2001 for $565 million.

When Radiata was acquired by Cisco in 2001. he became the Technology Director of their Wireless Networking Business Unit, until 2005, when he joined NICTA (National Information and Communications Technology Australia Ltd), where he was first chief executive officer (2005–2010) and finally, in 2011, Chairman.

== Public activities ==
Skellern was involved in debate on sharing of the spectrum which resulted in the allocation of additional 5 GHz spectrum for Wireless Access Systems at the World Radio Conference in 2003 (WRC2003).

== Honors ==
He has held visiting faculty and researcher appointments at Imperial College London, Hewlett-Packard Laboratories, Palo Alto, CA, Digital Equipment Corporation Paris Research Labs, France, and British Telecom Research Labs, Martlesham Heath, UK, Visiting Researcher.

He is a Fellow of the Institute of Electrical and Electronics Engineer for contributions to high speed devices and systems for wireless and wireline communications networks, a fellow of the Australian Academy of Technological Sciences and Engineering, and an honorary fellow of the Engineers Australia (Institute of Engineers Australia).

He received the Clunies Ross Award, Australian Academy of Technological Sciences and Engineering in 2010 the MA Sargent Medal, Engineers Australia, the CSIRO Tony Benson Award for Individual Achievement in ICT and the CSIRO Medal, and the Norman W V Hayes Medal, Institute of Radio and Electronic Engineers, 1980.

In 2012, he received the Order of Australia. In 2012, he received an honorary doctorate from Macquarie University.

Skellern was awarded the 2017 IEEE Masaru Ibuka Consumer Electronics Award (with John O'Sullivan) "for pioneering contributions to high-speed wireless LAN technology."

He won the 2010 M A Sargent Medal.
