= Ian Jacobs (oncologist) =

Vice Chancellor and President of UNSW (born 1957)

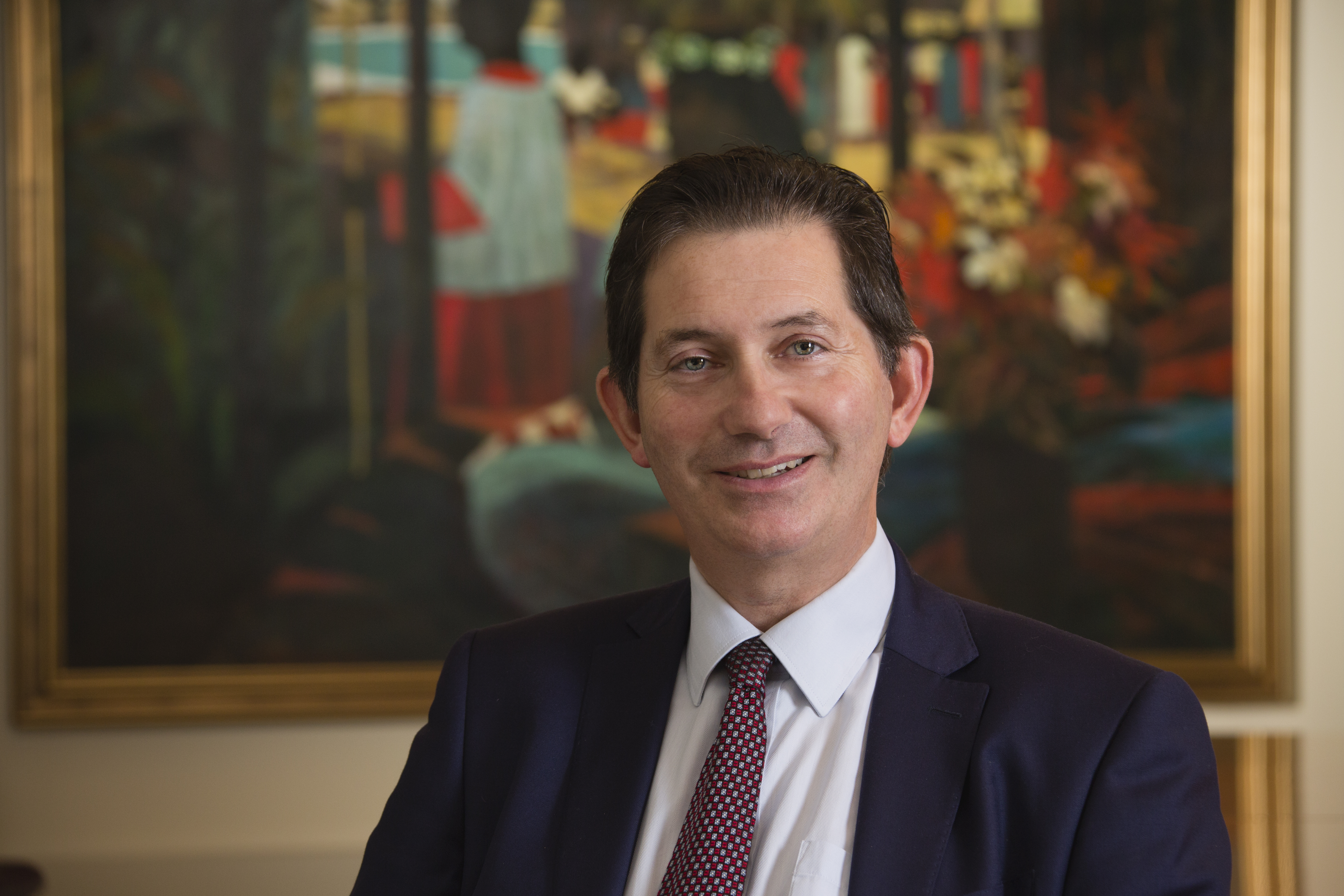
- Jacobs in 2014

9th Vice Chancellor and President of UNSW
- In office February 2015 – January 2022
- Chancellor: David Gonski
- Preceded by: Fred Hilmer
- Succeeded by: Attila Brungs

Personal details
- Born: 6 October 1957 (age 69)
- Education: Trinity College, Cambridge (BA, MA); University College London (MBBS); University of London (MD)
- Occupation: academic medical doctor gynaecological oncologist researcher

Ian Jacobs (born 6 October 1957) is an academic, medical doctor, gynaecological oncologist, charity founder and university leader from the UK, with dual British and Australian citizenship.

He began as the ninth president and vice-chancellor of the University of New South Wales in Australia in February 2015. Jacobs announced his resignation in January 2021, to take effect at the beginning of 2022.

== Early life and education ==
Jacobs was born in the East End of London and raised in Cockfosters in North London.

Jacobs is an alumnus of Trinity College, Cambridge, and the Middlesex Hospital Medical School, which is now part of University College London. He received a bachelor of arts and master of arts in medicine and law from Cambridge in 1980 and 1983, respectively. He qualified as a doctor of medicine (MBBS) from Middlesex Hospital Medical School in 1983. Jacobs was awarded a medical doctorate from the University of London in 1991.

Jacobs was the first in his family to gain a tertiary education, benefitting from the era of publicly funded education in the UK.

== Career ==
After qualifying as a doctor, Jacobs worked as a junior doctor at the Middlesex Hospital and at Mount Vernon Hospital. In 1984, he commenced specialist training in obstetrics and gynaecology at the Royal London Hospital and then Addenbrooke's Hospital, Cambridge, which he completed in 1990.

Also in 1984, Jacobs founded The Eve Appeal (first called the Gynaecology Cancer Research Fund), a charity with the aim of raising funds for research in gynaecologic cancer. In 1985, he began a program of research into ovarian cancer screening. He was subsequently Medical Director of the charity as well as Emeritus Trustee.

From 1990 to 1991, Jacobs received a fellowship from the Medical Research Council to research cancer genetics at Duke University. He became a member of the Royal College of Obstetricians and Gynaecologists in 1991 and received a Cancer Research Campaign (now Cancer Research UK) McElwain fellowship at Cambridge University from 1992 to 1994. He completed his subspecialist training in gynaecologic oncology at St Bartholomew's Hospital and the Royal Marsden Hospital in 1996, and began working as a consultant and senior lecturer at Barts and the London School of Medicine and Dentistry in the same year. Jacobs was promoted to Professor of Gynaecological Cancer at the Queen Mary University of London in 1999 and was Director of the Cancer Institute and Associate Research Dean before joining University College London (UCL) in 2004 as the head of the gynaecologic oncology research department. At UCL, Jacobs established the Elizabeth Garrett Anderson Institute for Women's Health (iFWH), the Ugandan Women's Health Initiative (UWHI), and the UCLH/UCL Biomedical Research Centre. From 2009 to 2011, Jacobs was dean of the Faculty of Biomedical Sciences.

After seven years, he departed from UCL in 2011 to take up the position of vice-president of the University of Manchester and the dean of its Faculty of Medical and Human Sciences. He also led the Manchester Academic Health Science Centre, which partnered the university with six NHS hospitals. While in Manchester, Jacobs founded the Northern Health Science Alliance (NHSA), involving leading universities, Academic Health Science Networks and NHS trusts across the north of England.

=== UNSW Sydney president and vice-chancellor ===
In 2015, Jacobs relocated from the UK to Sydney, Australia, after he was appointed president and vice-chancellor of the University of New South Wales (UNSW Sydney).

In his first year at UNSW Sydney, Jacobs launched the UNSW 2025 Strategy, a 10-year strategic plan to enhance the university's global impact and reputation. The strategy, published in October 2015 after wide-ranging consultation with the UNSW Sydney community, incorporated Jacobs’ belief in universities as the drivers of societal and economic transformation.

He was elected a Fellow of the Australian Academy of Health and Medical Sciences in 2019.

=== Research ===
Jacobs initiated and was chief investigator for the following ovarian cancer research programs, which were funded by a combination of the Medical Research Council (MRC), the National Institute for Health Research (NIHR), Cancer Research UK (CRUK) and The Eve Appeal:

- UKFOCSS (UK Familial Ovarian Cancer Screening Study)
- UKCTOCS (UK Collaborative Trial of Ovarian Cancer Screening)
- PROMISE (Prediction of Risk of Ovarian Malignancy Screening and Early Detection) program
- GCaPPS (Genetic Cancer Prediction through Population Screening)

Since the early 2000s, Jacobs’ research programs have received approximately AUD $100 million in funding and resulted in more than 400 publications with an h-index greater than 85.

In May 2021, the results of the UKCTOCS were published in The Lancet. The research found that although ovarian cancer can be detected early and before women develop symptoms, this does not translate into saving lives. Jacobs wrote an account of his 35-year involvement in the research in The Conversation, expressing his sadness and disappointment that the study did not find the outcome for which the research team had hoped.

Jacobs is founder, non-executive director and consultant to Abcodia, a University College London spin-out company involved in biomarker discovery and development.

== Personal life ==
Jacobs is married to Chris Jacobs, a nurse and genetic counsellor whom he met at Middlesex Hospital. They have three children. His great grandparents were migrants from Poland and Russia. His parents grew up in East London and until retiring ran a retail pharmacy.

Academic offices
Preceded by Fred Hilmer	9th Vice-Chancellor and President of the University of New South Wales; January 2015 – January 2022	Succeeded by Attila Brungs
