= Abcodia =

Cancer research company

- Company type: Private
- Industry: Biotechnology
- Founded: September 2010
- Headquarters: Cambridge, United Kingdom
- Key people: CEO; Julie Barnes, COO; Chris Hodkinson, Director of Science; Wendy Alderton; Director of Business Development; Mike Fisher; Chair; Andy Richards; Non-Exec Director and Principal Investigator for UKCTOCS. Ian Jacobs; Non-Exec Directors; Andrew Elder and Claire Hooper
- Website: www.abcodia.com

Abcodia is a company that focuses on biomarkers for cancer screening. Its aim is to discover biomarkers that can be used for the early detection of cancer.

== Disease focus ==
Abcodia's primary focus is the study of biomarkers for cancer.

=== Cancer screening ===
On 18 September 2013 Abcodia announced that it had entered into an agreement for an exclusive license for the Risk of Ovarian Cancer Algorithm (ROCA), a test studied for screening of ovarian cancer. The use of this test is not recommended by the FDA as there is no evidence it is either safe or effective.

== History ==
Abcodia is a spin-out from University College London and was founded in 2010. UCL granted Abcodia the exclusive commercialisation rights to a serum collection created by clinical scientists at the Institute for Women's Health at UCL. The serum biobank was formed as part of the UK Collaborative Trial of Ovarian Cancer Screening UKCTOCS, which was led by Professor Ian Jacobs and Professor Usha Menon.

== Awards ==
December 2012, Abcodia won four prizes at the UK Startup Awards 2012 annual awards: Angel or VC-backed Business of the Year, Innovative Business of the Year, and Business Woman of the Year for its CEO Dr Julie Barnes. It also won the overall NatWest Startups Business of the Year for its work in cancer screening.
