= Rutherford Ness Robertson =

Australian botanist and biologist (1913–2001)

Sir Rutherford Robertson AC CMG FAA FRS FRSE
- Born: Rutherford Ness Robertson; 29 September 1913; Melbourne, Victoria, Australia
- Died: 6 March 2001 (aged 87); Yass, New South Wales, Australia
- Occupations: Botanist; biologist; researcher
- Spouse: Lady Mary Rogerson (m. 1937)

Academic background
- Education: Carey Baptist Grammar School; St Andrew's College
- Alma mater: University of Sydney; University of Cambridge

Academic work
- Discipline: Botany
- Institutions: CSIRO; University of Sydney; University of Adelaide; Australian National University

Sir Rutherford Ness "Bob" Robertson AC CMG FAA FRS FRSE (29 September 1913 – 6 March 2001) was an Australian botanist and biologist, and winner of the Clarke Medal in 1955.

== Early life and education ==
Robertson was born in Melbourne, Victoria (Australia), the son of Baptist missionary, Rev J. Robertson. In his first years, he suffered from polio.

He was first educated at Carey Baptist Grammar School, where he was a foundation scholar in 1923 and eventually left in 1925 to complete his secondary education in New Zealand after his father’s missionary work moved him to Christchurch.

He was then educated at St. Andrew's College, Christchurch and matriculated in 1930 to when he later obtained a Bachelor of Science (BSc) degree at the University of Sydney in 1934.

In 1939, Robertson completed a Doctorate of Philosophy (PhD) at St John's College, Cambridge in England. Later in 1939, Robertson became Assistant Lecturer, and later Lecturer in Botany at the University of Sydney. From 1952 to 1955 he was Senior Principal Research Officer at the CSIRO Division of Food Preservation and Transport.

== Career ==
While lecturing at the University of Sydney, he closely collaborated with CSIR (the precursor to the CSIRO) in the 1950s. Later on, Robertson would join the executive team at the CSIRO in 1958, where he would also become the visiting professor at the University of California in Los Angeles in the 1960s. In addition, Robertson would become a Professor of Botany at the University of Adelaide after leaving New South Wales (to work in South Australia) in 1962 and further to this, he became the Director of Biological Sciences at the Australian National University and the Australian Academy of Science throughout the 1970s and early 1980s.

He retired after further research at the University of Sydney in 1986.

== Personal life ==
In 1937, he married Mary Helen Bruce Robertson (née Rogerson). Together, they had a son, Robert.

In March 2001, Robertson died in Yass, New South Wales at the age of 87.

== Publications ==
- Science: Its Scope and Limits (1971)

== Honours and awards ==
- 1954 – Elected Fellow of the Australian Academy of Science (FAA)
- 1955 – Awarded Clarke Medal by the Royal Society of New South Wales
- 1961 – Elected Fellow of the Royal Society (FRS)
- 1962 – Elected a Foreign Associate of the United States National Academy of Sciences
- 1968 – Created a Companion of the Order of St Michael and St George (CMG)
- 1970 – Awarded Mueller Medal by the Australian and New Zealand Association for the Advancement of Science
- 1971 – Elected to the American Philosophical Society
- 1972 – Knighted by Queen Elizabeth II
- 1973 – Elected to the American Academy of Arts and Sciences
- 1975 – Awarded Macfarlane Burnet Medal and Lecture by the Australian Academy of Science
- 1980 – Awarded Companion of the Order of Australia (AC)
- 1983 – Elected an Honorary Fellow of the Royal Society of Edinburgh (FRSE)

Awards
Preceded by Edward de Courcy Clarke	Clarke Medal; 1955	Succeeded by Oscar Werner Tiegs
