= Edward de Courcy Clarke =

New Zealand geologist active in Australia

Edward de Courcy Clarke (10 November 1880 – 30 November 1956) was a New Zealand teacher, researcher, and field geologist, first in his birth country and then in Australia. He was the winner of the Clarke Medal in 1954.

== Biography ==
Clarke was born in Waimate North, New Zealand, and studied at the University of Auckland, graduating in 1901.

After teaching and geological work in New Zealand, Clarke joined the Geological Survey of Western Australia, serving 1912–20. Clarke was then appointed Lecturer-in-charge of the Department of Geology in the University of Western Australia, and retired as Professor in 1948.

Clarke died in Kalgoorlie on 30 November 1956, and his ashes were scattered at Karrakatta Cemetery.

The Edward de Courcy Clarke Earth Science Museum was named in his honour in 1989.

Awards
| Preceded by Alexander John Nicholson | Clarke Medal; 1954 | Succeeded by Rutherford Ness Robertson |
