= Fred Hilmer =

Australian academic and business figure (born 1945)

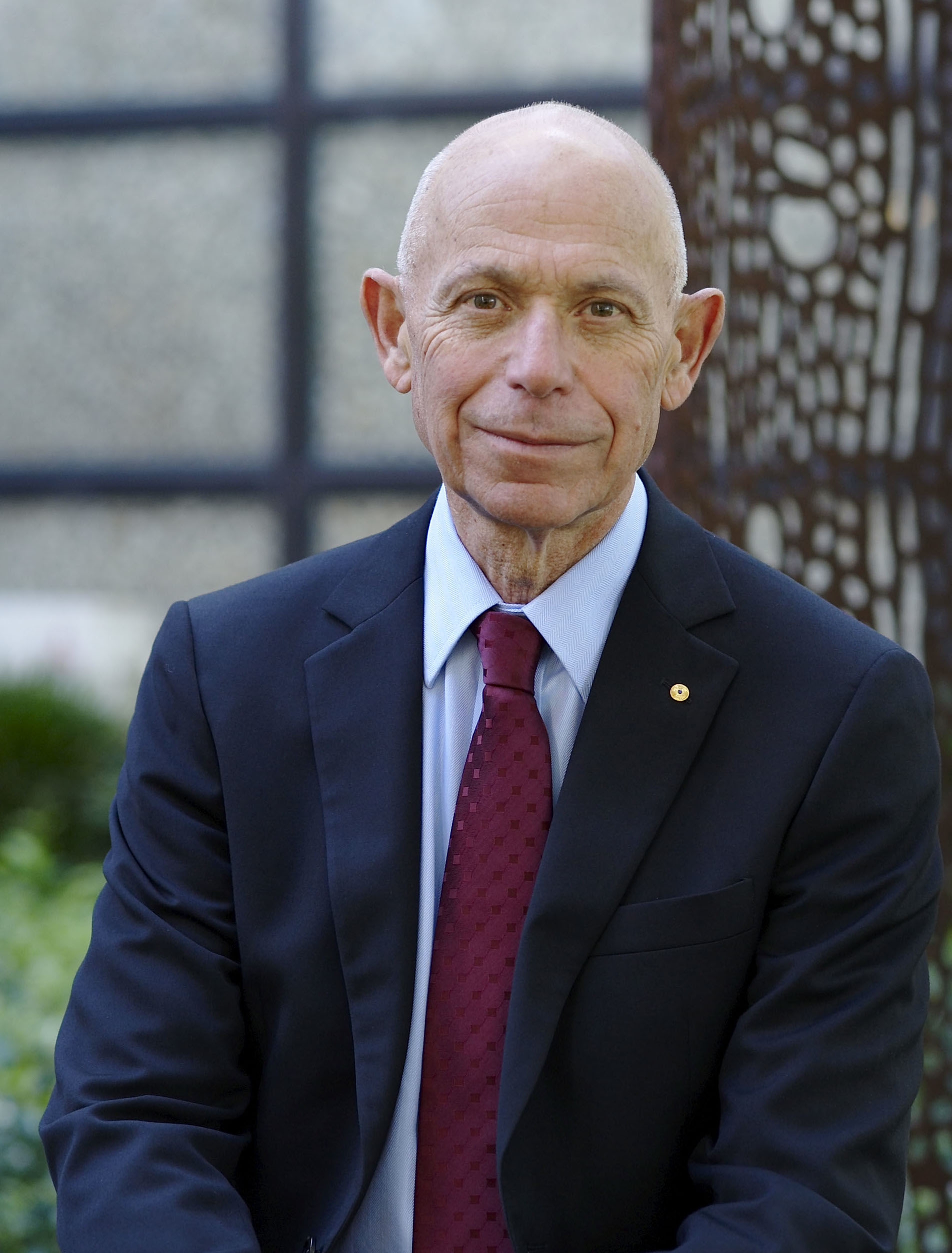
Professor Hilmer

Frederick George Hilmer AO (born 2 February 1945) is an Australian academic and business figure. He was the president and eighth vice-chancellor of the University of New South Wales, an appointment he held from June 2006 till January 2015. He has also served as a director and deputy-chairman of the Westfield Group between 1991 and 2013.

== Career ==
Hilmer was the chief executive officer of John Fairfax Holdings Limited from 1998 to 2005. Before joining Fairfax he was Dean and director of the Australian Graduate School of Management (AGSM) at the University of New South Wales from 1989 until 1998. He holds a Bachelor of Laws degree from the University of Sydney, where he graduated in 1966, a Master of Laws from the University of Pennsylvania, and a Master of Business Administration from the Wharton School of the University of Pennsylvania where he was appointed a Joseph Wharton Fellow.

He was a member of the Commonwealth Higher Education Council and chairman of the Business Council of Australia's Employee Relations Study Group. In 1992 and 1993 he chaired the National Competition Policy Review Committee, which led to the introduction of National Competition Policy in 1995.

Prior to joining the AGSM, Professor Hilmer was with McKinsey & Company for 19 years, spending the last 9 year managing the Australian practice. Professor Hilmer has also held a number of other senior business positions including chairman of Pacific Power, deputy chairman of Foster's Group Limited and a director of Coca-Cola Amatil, TNT and Macquarie Bank.

As CEO of Fairfax, Hilmer invested heavily in a new printing facility for The Age at Tullamarine. This reduced staff numbers from 280 to 160, prompting conflict with the Australian Manufacturing Worker's Union. Strikes led to The Age losing an edition for the first time in its history, and Hilmer delayed the opening of the new facility for three months to force the union to concede to the demand of management to have sole discretion over which staff were transferred to the new facility.

At the conclusion of the dispute, Hilmer issued each member of the management group who presided over the building of the Tullamarine plant with a golf ball inscribed with the names of unionists who he considered had given them trouble. He later wrote that the balls were still turning up years later on golf courses in Sydney and Melbourne.

He was vice-chancellor of the University of New South Wales from June 2006 till January 2015.

Hilmer was appointed chair of the Group of Eight (Go8), the coalition of Australia's leading research universities, in December 2011, and chair of Universitas 21 (U21), the global network of research-intensive universities, in May 2013.

== Publications ==
Fred Hilmer has written extensively on strategy, organisation and economic reform and is the author of a number of books, including:

- When The Luck Runs Out,
- New Games/New Rules,
- Strictly Boardroom (co-author),
- Working Relations and Management Redeemed, and
- The Fairfax Experience—What The Management Texts Didn't Teach Me.

== Honours ==
Hilmer was appointed an Officer of the Order of Australia in 1998 for his service to management education, competition policy, and workplace.

Academic offices
Preceded by Mark Wainwright	Vice Chancellor of UNSW; 2006 – January 2015	Succeeded by Ian Jacobs
