= M. A. Sargent Medal =

Australian award for electrical engineering

- Description: Longstanding eminence in the science or practice of electrical engineering
- Sponsored by: Engineers Australia
- Country: Australia
- Presented by: Electrical College, Engineers Australia
- Rewards: Engraved medal and framed certificate
- First award: 1989
- Currently held by: Gurinder Saluja (2026)
- Website: www.engineersaustralia.org.au/about-us/excellence-awards-program/achievement-awards

The M. A. Sargent Medal is an award presented by Engineers Australia to an electrical engineer who has made a highly significant contribution to the science or practice of electrical engineering. First awarded in 1989, it is the highest award of the Electrical College of Engineers Australia, and has been conferred jointly by the Electrical College and the Information, Telecommunications and Electronics Engineering College. The medal is named in honour of Michael Anthony (Mike) Sargent, a past president of the Institution of Engineers, Australia.

== History ==
Michael Anthony Sargent AM (23 July 1943 – 27 August 2022) studied electrical engineering at the University of Queensland, graduating with a Bachelor of Engineering in 1964 and a PhD in 1967. After engineering appointments in Queensland and North America, he joined the South East Queensland Electricity Board in 1978 and became its chief engineer in 1984. Within the Institution of Engineers, Australia, he was deputy chairman of the Electrical College Board in 1988, deputy president in 1989 and president in 1990. He received the Peter Nicol Russell Memorial Medal in 1992, was appointed a Member of the Order of Australia in 1993 for service to engineering, and became an Honorary Fellow of the Institution in 1995.

The inaugural medal, for 1989, was awarded to Stuart Lister, assistant general manager (generation) of the Queensland Electricity Commission. Since 2009 each medal has been designated by the year in which it is presented.

== Selection ==
The medal recognises an electrical engineer who meets one or more of the following:

- a significant contribution, through technical innovation, to the science or practice of electrical engineering;
- longstanding eminence in electrical engineering;
- exceptional and sustained management or leadership in electrical engineering; or
- a notable combination of these.

International peer recognition of a nominee's contributions is considered favourably. As of 2018, nominees had to be members of Engineers Australia and Australian citizens or permanent residents, and self-nominations were not accepted. The recipient receives an engraved medal and a framed certificate at an Engineers Australia event.

== Recipients ==
Unless otherwise noted, recipients and affiliations are as listed by Engineers Australia.

M. A. Sargent Medal recipients
Year	Recipient	Affiliation	Ref.
1989	Stuart G. Lister	Queensland Electricity Commission (Note: Engineers Australia's list gives the State Electricity Commission of Queensland; the contemporary report of the award gives the Queensland Electricity Commission.)	
1990	Graham Goodwin	University of Newcastle	
1991	John Ness	MITEC Ltd	
1992	W. Derek Humpage	University of Western Australia	
1993	W. John Edwards	Industrial Automation Services Pty Ltd	
1994	Martin Green	University of New South Wales	
1995	Rodney Tucker	University of Melbourne	
1996	Else Shepherd	Powerlink Queensland	
1997	John L. Hullett	Curtin University	
1998	John Richard (Rick) Gumley	Erico Lightning Technologies	
1999	Michael Miller	University of South Australia	
2000	Mark G. Sceats	Australian Photonics Cooperative Research Centre (Note: Sceats was chief executive of the Australian Photonics Cooperative Research Centre at the time of the award. Engineers Australia's list gives the University of Sydney.)	
2001	Not awarded	—	
2002	Brian D. O. Anderson	Australian National University	
2002	Yianni Attikiouzel	University of Western Australia (Note: Attikiouzel was a professor at the University of Western Australia from 1976 to 2002, when he became executive dean at Murdoch University.)	
2003	Henry d'Assumpcao	Defence Science and Technology Organisation	
2004	Richard Middleton	University of Newcastle	
2005	Noel Godfrey	Hatch Associates	
2006	Barry Inglis	CSIRO	
2007	Vic Gosbell	University of Wollongong	
2008	Keith Hilless	ZeroGen Pty Ltd	
2009	None (Note: No medal is designated 2009. From that year, medals have been designated by the year of presentation.)	—	
2010	David Skellern	Macquarie University	
2011	Paul Wilson	Queensland University of Technology	
2012	Trevor S. Bird	CSIRO	
2013	John O'Sullivan	CSIRO	
2014	Don Sinnott	Defence Science and Technology Organisation	
2015	David Sweeting	University of Wollongong	
2015	Alex Zelinsky	Defence Science and Technology Organisation	
2016	Alan Finkel	Office of the Chief Scientist	
2017	Hugh Durrant-Whyte	University of Sydney	
2018	Xinghuo Yu	RMIT University	
2019	Derek Abbott	University of Adelaide	
2020	Ian Hiskens	University of Michigan	
2021	Ian Webster	Ampcontrol	
2021	Qing-Long Han	Swinburne University of Technology	
2022	Tapan Saha	University of Queensland	
2022	Peng Shi	University of Adelaide	
2022	Lachlan Blackhall	Australian National University (Note: Presented at the national Engineers Australia Excellence Awards ceremony in Sydney in October 2022.)	
2024	Mahdi Jalili	RMIT University	
2025	Peter Stepien	ResTech	
2026	Gurinder Saluja	Transgrid	

== See also ==
- List of engineering awards
