= Alexander John Nicholson =

Irish Australian entomologist

Alexander John Nicholson (25 March 1895 – 28 October 1969) was an Irish Australian entomologist who specialized in insect population dynamics. He was Chief of the CSIR / CSIRO Division of Economic Entomology for 24 years and is credited with initiating the professional era in Australian entomology. He was a Foundation Fellow of the Australian Academy of Science.

Nicholson was born in Ireland. He studied at the University of Birmingham and served in the British military in World War I. He came to Australia in 1921.

Experiments He performed his experiments of population dynamics on the Sheep blowfly. The interesting thing about sheep blowfly females is that they must receive a meal before laying eggs near the tail or by exposed wounds. Next, the maggots hatch from the eggs, feeding on flesh of the sheep which makes them grow bigger. The sheep possibly die when the maggots penetrate the skin and feed on their internal organs. Due to the need of a meal for blowfly females to lay eggs, density dependence effects on their populations was studied by Nicholson.

Findings and Conclusions In Nicholson's first experiment he gave an abundance of food to the adult blowflies so females could lay eggs , therefore leading to a massive amount of eggs laid. Then he made sure maggots only had 50 grams of food per day. So after the eggs hatched almost all of the maggots died prior to adulthood. This led to a decline in adult populations and then the population reached such low numbers that the eggs actually produced had ample food to reach adulthood. Hence, the adult population rose again, creating a constant cycle . In the second experiment he limited the amount of food for both maggots and adults. This resulted in a population increase until it hit the carrying capacity . This experiment exhibited the effects of density dependence on population.

He is notable for the Nicholson–Bailey model.

Awards
Preceded by Joseph Garnett Wood	Clarke Medal; 1953	Succeeded by Edward de Courcy Clarke
