= Robert Eugene Bogner =

Australian electrical engineer (born 1934)

- Born: 26 August 1934 (age 92); Melbourne, Victoria, Australia
- Education: University of Adelaide (ME); Imperial College London (PhD, DIC)
- Occupations: Electrical engineer, academic
- Known for: Frequency-sampling filters and Hilbert transformers Introduction to Digital Filtering (1975); General chair of ICASSP 1994
- Awards: Fellow, Institution of Electrical Engineers; Fellow, Institution of Engineers Australia; Senior Member, IEEE; Life Member, Indian Science Congress Association
- Scientific career
- Fields: Electrical engineering, signal processing
- Workplaces: University of Adelaide / Adelaide University; Imperial College London; University of Queensland; Postmaster-General's Department Research Laboratories
- Thesis: Processing of the phase of angle-modulated signals (1973)
- Doctoral advisors: Colin Cherry
- Website: Adelaide University profile

Robert Eugene Bogner (born 26 August 1934) is an Australian electrical engineer and emeritus professor at the University of Adelaide, where he was Professor of Electrical Engineering from 1973 to 2001. His work has spanned communication engineering, digital signal processing, speech communication, electroacoustics, pattern recognition, human factors and microwave modelling, and later radar and sensor signal processing. With A. G. Constantinides he edited the textbook Introduction to Digital Filtering (Wiley, 1975).

At Adelaide he was head of the Department of Electrical Engineering from 1973 to 1979 and dean of the Faculty of Engineering in 1976–77 and 1981–82. He was founder member and first co-ordinator of the Adelaide Consortium for Telecommunication Studies, a founder member of the Cooperative Research Centre for Sensor Signal and Information Processing (CSSIP), and general chair of the 1994 IEEE International Conference on Acoustics, Speech and Signal Processing (ICASSP), held in Adelaide.

== Early life and education ==
Bogner was born in Melbourne on 26 August 1934. He graduated in electrical engineering from the University of Adelaide in 1956 and then joined the Postmaster-General's Research Laboratories as a research engineer, completing a Master of Engineering degree at Adelaide in 1959 for work on speech signal processing.

He later completed a PhD at Imperial College London (then part of the University of London) while a lecturer there, graduating in 1973 with a thesis on processing the phase of angle-modulated signals. His doctoral adviser was Colin Cherry, and part of the research was carried out at Bell Telephone Laboratories in New Jersey. He also holds the Diploma of Imperial College (DIC).

== Career ==
=== Early career ===
After his period at the Postmaster-General's Research Laboratories, Bogner joined the University of Queensland in 1961 as a lecturer in electrical engineering, where he developed the university's courses in electronics and telecommunication engineering.

=== Imperial College London (1967–1973) ===
From 1967 to 1973 Bogner was a lecturer in electrical engineering at the Imperial College of Science and Technology. In 1969 he published a paper in the Bell System Technical Journal showing that a conventional frequency sampling digital filter can be modified, by replacing its resonators with simple complex-number resonators, to produce the Hilbert transform of its output alongside the ordinary filtered output, and relating this structure to filtering by the discrete Fourier transform. The paper reported that a Fortran IV routine based on the method had been used to filter and Hilbert-transform speech signals, and acknowledged discussions with C. H. Coker, Lawrence Rabiner and Ronald W. Schafer.

=== University of Adelaide (1973–2001) ===
In 1973 Bogner was appointed Professor of Electrical Engineering at the University of Adelaide, following the retirement at the end of 1972 of Eric Osborne Willoughby, who had held the chair since the department was founded in 1946. He was head of department from 1973 to 1979, and dean of the Faculty of Engineering in 1976 and 1977 and again in 1981 and 1982.

Between 1974 and 1979 Bogner and John Rogers, with David Fensom, Neil Smith and others, designed and built the General Arithmetic Processor (GASP), described in a history of the school as the first floating-point Harvard signal processor in Australia; it was used for the acoustical analysis of speech. In 1982 he received a cheque for $27,000 from Esso on behalf of the department. In July 1982 the university council approved the department's proposal to rename itself the Department of Electrical and Electronic Engineering, although Bogner's position kept the title of Chair of Electrical Engineering.

Bogner was a founder member and first co-ordinator of the Adelaide Consortium for Telecommunication Studies in 1987, and in 1992 a founder member of the Cooperative Research Centre for Sensor Signal and Information Processing, a government-funded centre established in April 1992 for research in signal and information processing, radar, target tracking and recognition, and data fusion. His department was a partner in the centre alongside the Defence Science and Technology Organisation, four other universities and several companies.

He retired in 2001 and was named Emeritus Professor. He remains listed as an emeritus professor in the School of Electrical and Mechanical Engineering of Adelaide University, the institution formed in 2026 by the merger of the University of Adelaide and the University of South Australia.

== Research ==
=== Digital filtering and phase processing ===
Bogner's doctoral research at Imperial College dealt with signal processing of phase-modulated (angle-modulated) signals. His 1969 Bell System Technical Journal paper on frequency sampling filters, Hilbert transformers and resonators came out of this period. In 1975 he and A. G. Constantinides edited Introduction to Digital Filtering, a 198-page volume published by Wiley-Interscience.

=== Speech and acoustics ===
Speech signal processing was the subject of Bogner's master's research at the Postmaster-General's Research Laboratories, and remained a theme of his work at Adelaide. He and John Rogers were among the contributors to the 1972 Conference on Speech Communication and Processing, and the GASP processor they built in the 1970s was used to analyse speech acoustics. With Tzuyin Li he presented a pattern-search method for predicting speech at ICASSP 1989, and in 1998 he, Bradley Ferguson and Steve Wawryk proposed a "bottle" model of head-related transfer functions.

=== Vision chips, neural networks and pattern recognition ===
In the 1990s Bogner co-authored the department's work on VLSI motion-detection chips modelled on the early visual processing of insects. A 1994 paper described a smart visual micro-sensor that reported the direction of motion, bearing and speed of objects, intended for autonomous robot navigation and for collision-avoidance uses such as smart vehicle bumpers. A 1997 paper in the IEEE Journal of Solid-State Circuits, with Alireza Moini, Abdesselam Bouzerdoum, Kamran Eshraghian, Derek Abbott and others, described a mixed analogue–digital chip with two one-dimensional arrays of 64 processing cells, each containing a photodetector and early-vision circuitry, fabricated in a 1.2 µm CMOS process. He later applied support vector machines to image interpretation and classification.

=== Blind signal separation ===
With Kenneth Pope, Bogner published a two-part study of blind signal separation in Digital Signal Processing in 1996, treating linear instantaneous mixtures in the first part and linear convolutive mixtures in the second. In 1997 he co-authored, with Andrzej Cichocki, Leszek Moszczyński and Pope, a paper on modified Hérault–Jutten algorithms for blind source separation.

=== Radar and sensor signal processing ===
Bogner's later research focused on sensor signal processing, particularly radar track association, data fusion and visual sensing. He supervised Michael Southcott's 1998 PhD thesis on radar track association. With Zhishun She and Douglas Gray he developed four approaches to autofocus for inverse synthetic-aperture radar (ISAR) imaging based on beamforming and subspace methods; by estimating a complex exponential of the phase rather than the phase itself, the methods avoided phase unwrapping, and the authors derived the corresponding Cramér–Rao bounds.

=== Energy conversion ===
Bogner has had a continuing interest in energy conversion, pursued through the design of unusual electrical machines.

== Professional service ==
Bogner was general chair of ICASSP-94, the IEEE International Conference on Acoustics, Speech and Signal Processing, held at the Adelaide Convention Centre from 19 to 22 April 1994 under the sponsorship of the IEEE Signal Processing Society; its proceedings were published in six volumes. He served as a director of the IEEE Signal Processing Society and chaired the society's Standing Sub-committee on Education.

His interest in engineering education is reflected in a 1996 paper with Mary Ayre and John Monro on signal processing education in Australia. Using two case studies, a flexible continuing-education programme for practising graduates and a reform of the curriculum for para-professional and technician engineers, it examined how growing industrial demand for digital signal processing skills could be met despite Australia's large area, small population and divided federal and state responsibilities.

== Honours and memberships ==
Honour or membership	Awarding body	Ref.
Fellow (FIEE)	Institution of Electrical Engineers (UK)	
Fellow (FIEAust)	Institution of Engineers Australia	
Senior Member (SMIEEE)	Institute of Electrical and Electronics Engineers	
Life Member	Indian Science Congress Association	
Emeritus Professor (2001)	University of Adelaide	

== Books ==
- Bogner, R. E.; Constantinides, A. G., eds. (1975). Introduction to Digital Filtering. London; New York: Wiley. ISBN 0-471-08590-1. OCLC 914772. A Wiley-Interscience volume of xii + 198 pages.

== Selected publications ==
- Bogner, R. E. (March 1969). "Frequency sampling filters – Hilbert transformers and resonators". Bell System Technical Journal. 48 (3): 501–510.
- Pope, Kenneth J.; Bogner, Robert E. (1996). "Blind signal separation I: linear, instantaneous combinations". Digital Signal Processing. 6 (1): 5–16. doi:10.1006/dspr.1996.0002.
- Pope, Kenneth J.; Bogner, Robert E. (1996). "Blind signal separation II: linear, convolutive combinations". Digital Signal Processing. 6 (1): 17–28. doi:10.1006/dspr.1996.0003.
- Bogner, R. E.; Ayre, Mary; Monro, John (1996). "Signal processing education in Australia – some innovations". Digital Signal Processing. 6 (3): 129–137. doi:10.1006/dspr.1996.0013.
- Moini, Alireza; Bouzerdoum, Abdesselam; Eshraghian, Kamran; Yakovleff, Andre; Nguyen, Xuan Thong; Blanksby, Andrew; Beare, Richard; Abbott, Derek; Bogner, Robert E. (1997). "An insect vision-based motion detection chip". IEEE Journal of Solid-State Circuits. 32 (2): 279–284. doi:10.1109/4.551924.
- Cichocki, Andrzej; Bogner, Robert E.; Moszczyński, Leszek; Pope, Kenneth (1997). "Modified Herault–Jutten algorithms for blind separation of sources". Digital Signal Processing. 7 (2): 80–93. doi:10.1006/dspr.1997.0281.
- Ferguson, Bradley; Bogner, Robert E.; Wawryk, Steve (1998). A bottle model for head-related transfer functions. IEEE International Conference on Acoustics, Speech and Signal Processing (ICASSP 1998). pp. 3533–3536. doi:10.1109/ICASSP.1998.679632.
- She, Zhishun; Gray, Douglas A.; Bogner, Robert E. (2001). "Autofocus for inverse synthetic aperture radar (ISAR) imaging". Signal Processing. 81 (2): 275–291. doi:10.1016/S0165-1684(00)00207-3.
