= John O'Sullivan (engineer) =

Australian engineer

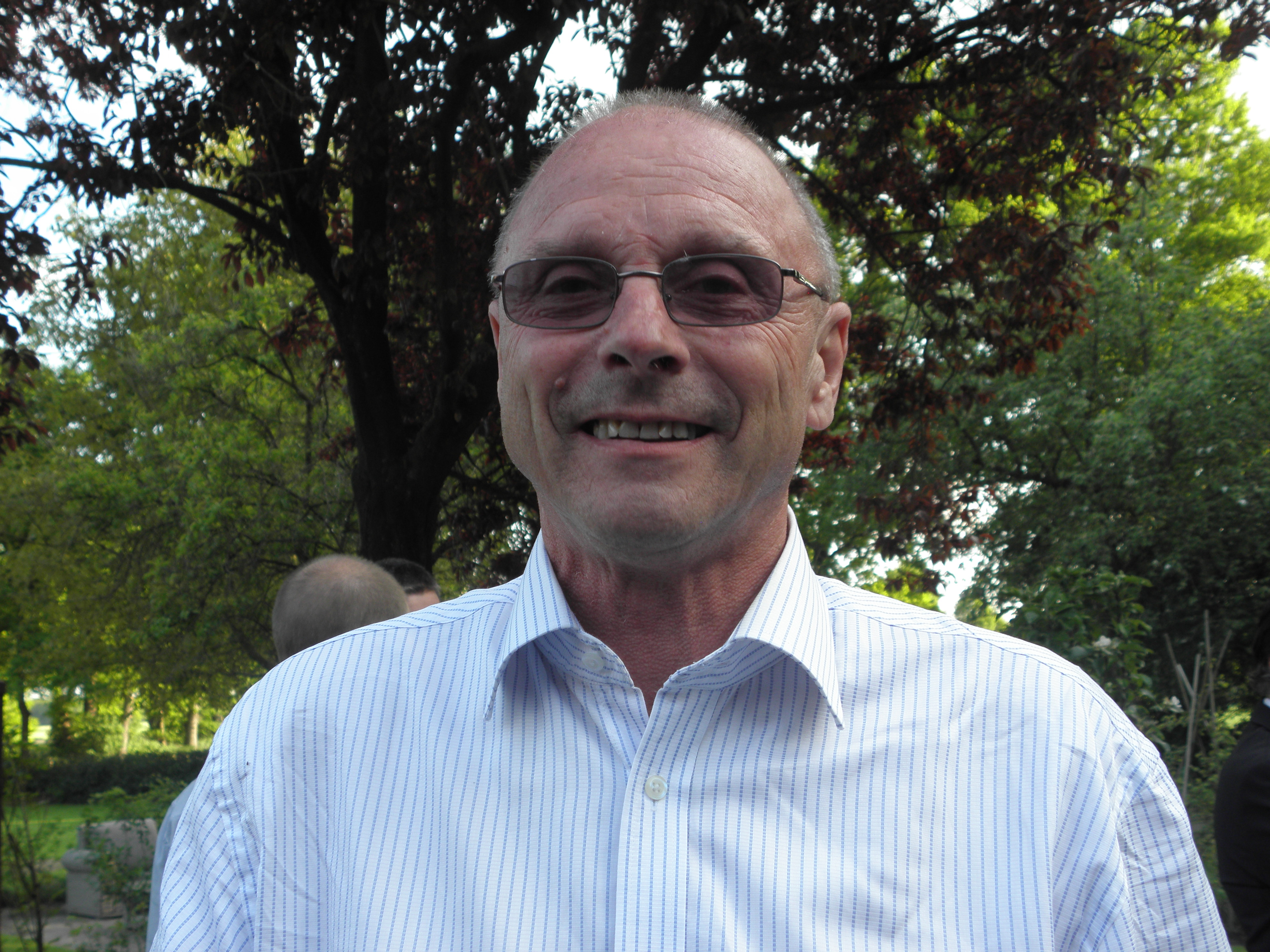
- O'Sullivan in 2013
- Education: University of Sydney
- Engineering career
- Employer: CSIRO
- Awards: Prime Minister's Prize for Science; M. A. Sargent Medal

John O'Sullivan is an Australian engineer.

== Fourier transforms and WiFi ==
John O'Sullivan, while working at the Dwingeloo Radio Observatory in the Netherlands, co-authored a paper in the Journal of the Optical Society of America titled "Image sharpness, Fourier optics, and redundant-spacing interferometry" with J. P. Hamaker, and J. E. Noordam. In this paper, they presented a technique for sharpening and improving picture clarity in radio astronomy images.

In the early 1990s, O'Sullivan led a team at the CSIRO which patented, in 1996, the use of a related technique for reducing multipath interference of radio signals transmitted for computer networking. This technology is a part of all recent WiFi implementations. As of April 2012, the CSIRO has earned over $430 million in royalties and settlements arising from the use of this patent as part of the 802.11 standards with as much as a billion dollars expected after further lawsuits against other parties.

O'Sullivan joined Morse Micro in 2019. The Sydney-based company is developing a Wi-Fi microprocessor, now known as Wi-Fi HaLow.

== Qualification ==
- 1974 Doctor of Philosophy (Electrical Engineering), Sydney University
- 1969 Bachelor of Engineering, H1, University Medal, Sydney University
- 1969 Sydney University Sports Blue (Hockey)
- 1967 Bachelor of Science, Sydney University

== Career ==
- 2019 THE AWARD OF {IRTE} International Recognition of Technological Excellence "for pioneering on the forefront of our modern technological reliant world"
- 2017 The IEEE Masaru Ibuka Consumer Electronics Award (with David Skellern) "for pioneering contributions to high-speed wireless LAN technology."
- 2013 M A Sargent Medal
- 2012 The European Inventor Award 2012 awarded by European Patent Office for having "made the wireless LAN as fast and powerful as the cabled solutions of the time, and is the basis for the wireless networking technology (Wi-Fi) now used in billions of devices worldwide."
- 2012 Fellow of Australian Academy of Technological Sciences and Engineering
- 2010 Fellow of Australian Academy of Science
- 2009 Prime Minister's Prizes for Science
- 2009 CSIRO Chairman's Medal
- 2005–present Systems Engineer, CSIRO Australia Telescope National Facility
- 2004–2006 Lead Signal Processing Architect, G2 Microsystems
- 2001–2004 Director IC Systems Engineering, Cisco Systems
- 2000 CSIRO Medal for development and application of fast Fourier transform technology
- 1999–2001 Vice President Systems Engineering, Radiata Communications
- 1995–2000 Director Technology, News Ltd
- 1989–1995 Deputy Chief of Division, CSIRO Radiophysics
- 1983–1989 Head of Signal Processing Group, CSIRO Radiophysics
- 1974–1983 Head of Receiver Group, Netherlands Foundation for Radio Astronomy (now ASTRON)

== Research highlights ==
- Achieved an eight-fold increase of the bandwidth processing capacity of the Westerbork Radio Telescope as project leader for the digital continuum backend receiver
- Participated in a series of innovative experiments to detect exploding black holes and other short time astronomical events
- Developed an intellectual underpinning for adaptive optics in light telescopes and redundant baseline interferometer in radio telescopes
- With Austek Microsystems created a fast Fourier transform computer chip. This VLSI chip consisted of 160,000 transistors and performed real time transforms at rates up to 2.5 Msamples/s
- Influential role in the system design for the Australia Telescope
- Led a CSIRO team comprising Graham Daniels, John Deane, Diethelm Ostry, Terry Percival who together invented a patented technology that uses fast Fourier transform and other techniques to enable fast, robust wireless networking in the home and office
- Led the system design for the world's first 802.11a (WiFi) chipset developed by Radiata Networks
- Over 40 scientific and technical papers at numerous industry conferences
- Granted 12 patents in the area of special purpose FFT processors, Wireless LANs and antennas
- Member of the Institute of Electrical and Electronics Engineers and Institute of Engineers Australia
- Member of international review committee for information and communications technologies in CSIRO
- Member of Australian Square Kilometre Array Consultative Committee
- Chair of the Mathematics, Information and Communication Sciences Expert Advisory Committee, Convenor ICT Appraisal committee, 2004 CRC selection round
- Optical Society of America
- Board Director AAPT, Taggle Systems
