= Bognor Reef =

Coordinates: 50.775°N 0.706°W

- Site of Special Scientific Interest
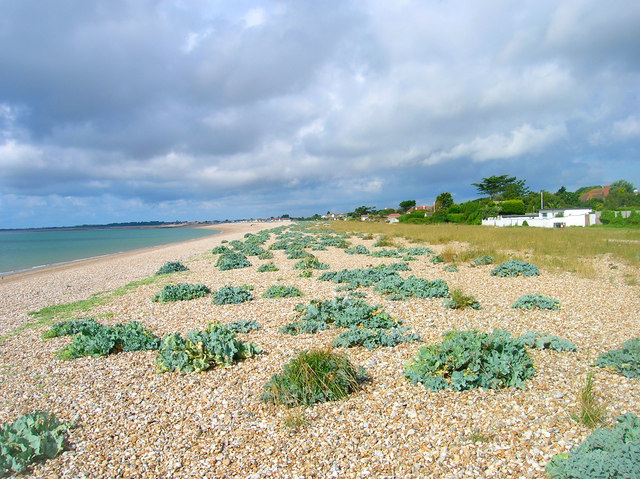
- Location of Bognor Reef.
- Area of search: West Sussex
- Grid reference: SZ 913 981
- Interest: Biological; Geological
- Area: 39.7 hectares (98 acres)
- Notification date: 1988
- Location map: Magic Map

Bognor Reef is a 39.7-hectare (98-acre) biological and geological Site of Special Scientific Interest which stretches along the foreshore of Bognor Regis in West Sussex. It is a Geological Conservation Review site.

This is an area of beach, sand dunes, grassland, scrub and marsh. Flora include the nationally endangered childing pink. It is one of the few areas which has the full sequence of layers in the London Clay, dating to the Early Eocene. It is particularly valuable for plant fossils. It is described by Natural England as the most important site in the world for pyritised fossil insects, especially beetles.
