= Kamran Eshraghian =

Australian electrical engineer (born 1945)

- Born: 13 June 1945 (age 81); Iran
- Citizenship: Australian
- Education: University of Adelaide
- Known for: CMOS VLSI design
- Children: 6
- Scientific career
- Fields: Electronics engineer
- Workplaces: University of California, Merced; Edith Cowan University; University of Adelaide; Philips Research; Chungbuk National University
- Doctoral advisor: Peter Harold Cole
- Other academic advisors: Robert Eugene Bogner
- Doctoral students: Derek Abbott

Kamran Eshraghian (born 13 June 1945) is an Iranian-Australian electronics engineer notable for working on VLSI in Australia. He has worked on CMOS VLSI design.

== Personal life ==
Kamran Eshraghian was born in Tehran on 13 June 1945, in a Baha'i family. On his father side, he is related to the Afnan families through his grandmother. In 1957, his parents decided to leave Iran for Indonesia and Singapore as Baha'i pioneers. On 5 May 1959, he left Singapore to do his schooling in Adelaide, South Australia arriving in Perth on 6 May 1959 and Adelaide the next day 7 May 1959. He was married on 13 May 1967 to Deidre Lynett Eyers, who died due to prolonged illness on 2 January 1989.

== Education ==
Eshraghian attended Adelaide High School followed by Gawler High School for years 9 and 10. Afterwards, he went to Port Pirie High School in 1962 for his Matriculation year which permitted entry to University and was compulsory for entrance to University. In Port Pirie High School, he was elected as the President of the Science Club.

In 1969, he obtained his bachelor's degree in electrical engineering from University of Adelaide. In 1977, Eshraghian completed his M.Eng.Sci, at the university, under Robert Eugene Bogner, with a thesis entitled Vehicle Traffic Monitoring. In 1981, he completed his PhD, under Peter Harold Cole, with a thesis entitled Electromagnetic Traffic Sensing and Surveillance. In 2004, Eshraghian was awarded Doctor of Engineering e.h. (May 2004) by the University of Ulm, Germany for integration of microelectronics with photonics. He was the fourth person that received the award given by the University of Ulm and the very first to a non-German academic.

== Career ==
In 1979, he joined the Department of Electrical & Electronic Engineering at the University of Adelaide after spending some 10 years with Philips Research both in Europe and Australia.

He has been a professor at Edith Cowan University in Perth, Western Australia.

From 2009, Eshraghian worked as the Distinguished Professor, Coordinator of Research program World Class University (WCU) Program at Chungbuk National University, Korea. South Korea's Science Foundation invited scholars, including 9 Nobel Prize laureates, 12 members of the U.S. National Academy of Sciences or equivalent ranking to teach and lead advanced research at respective domestic campuses as part of government's initiative to advance nation's higher education. Eshraghian task was to introduce a new program and formulate and implement the new concept of System-on-System integration utilizing the newly nano- engineered memristor as the core of program.

== Publications of journals and books ==
Eshraghian was the co-author of 6 influential books in his field such as Basic VLSI and Principles of CMOS VLSI Design: A Systems Perspective. He is the author and/or co-author of more than 200 articles in scientific journals, proceedings of international conferences and symposia.

== Achievements and awards ==
Eshraghian is the recipient of a number of awards and grants such as the architect and recipient of grant from Government of Western Australia in 2003 for establishment of Centre of Excellence for MicroPhotonics Systems. In 2001, he also received the Vice Chancellor's Entrepreneurial award for his entrepreneurial activities.
