= Peter Harold Cole =

Australian electronic engineer (1936–2020)

Peter H. Cole
- Born: 20 December 1936; Mayfield, New South Wales
- Died: 22 May 2020 (aged 83); Adelaide, South Australia, Australia
- Citizenship: Australian
- Education: University of Sydney
- Known for: RFIDs
- Awards: Fulbright scholarship
- Scientific career
- Fields: Electronic engineer
- Workplaces: University of Adelaide; University of Sydney
- Doctoral advisor: Ronald Ernest Aitchison
- Doctoral students: Andrew Parfitt; Kamran Eshraghian

Peter Harold Cole (20 December 1936 – 22 May 2020) was an Australian electronic engineer, notable for pioneering research in the area of radio-frequency identification (RFID) technology, having held over 30 patents.

== Education ==
Peter Cole obtained his BSc (1957), BE (1959) and PhD (1964) degrees at the University of Sydney, and then was a postdoc for three years at the Massachusetts Institute of Technology under a Fulbright scholarship. He obtained his PhD, under Ronald Ernest Aitchison, at the University of Sydney in 1964 with a thesis entitled Energy Exchange and Loss Properties of Ferrites for Parametric Amplifiers. For his BE he won the university medal.

== Career ==
His work was in the areas of radio frequency identification (RFID), electromagnetic engineering, microcircuit design, and signal processing. He taught at the University of Adelaide and the University of Sydney, and was a professor of Radio Frequency Identification Systems in the School of Electrical and Electronic Engineering at The University of Adelaide until his death. He was a founder of the company Integrated Silicon Design Pty. Ltd., a South Australian Company specialising in RFID systems. From 1984 to 1999 he was the Chairman of Directors of Integrated Silicon Design Pty. Ltd. In 2002, he was invited to join the Auto-ID Center established by MIT, and then Director of the Auto-ID Laboratory at Adelaide, one of six Auto-ID research laboratories throughout the world supported by EPCglobal.

== Books ==
- Peter H. Cole and Damith C. Ranasinghe, Networked RFID Systems and Lightweight Cryptography: Raising Barriers to Product Counterfeiting, Springer, 2007, ISBN 3-540-71640-8.
