= Resources & Energy Sector Infrastructure Council =

The Resources and Energy Sector Infrastructure Council (RESIC) was created by the State Government of South Australia in 2007 to support the development of future infrastructure projects. It was a small group of senior executives selected to represent the industry and public sector's leaders. The council facilitates close working relationships between private and public sectors on infrastructure planning and development matters and aims to foster cooperation between companies to maximize the value of proposed infrastructure and minimize unnecessary duplication.

RESIC initiated a Resource and Energy Infrastructure Demand Study in 2011, which led to the development of a Regional Mining and Infrastructure Plan, prepared by Deloitte. The plan recommended the establishment of a Resource Infrastructure Taskforce (RIT).

In 2015, RESIC merged with the Resources Industry Development Board (RIDB), forming the Minerals and Energy Advisory Council.

== 2014 members ==
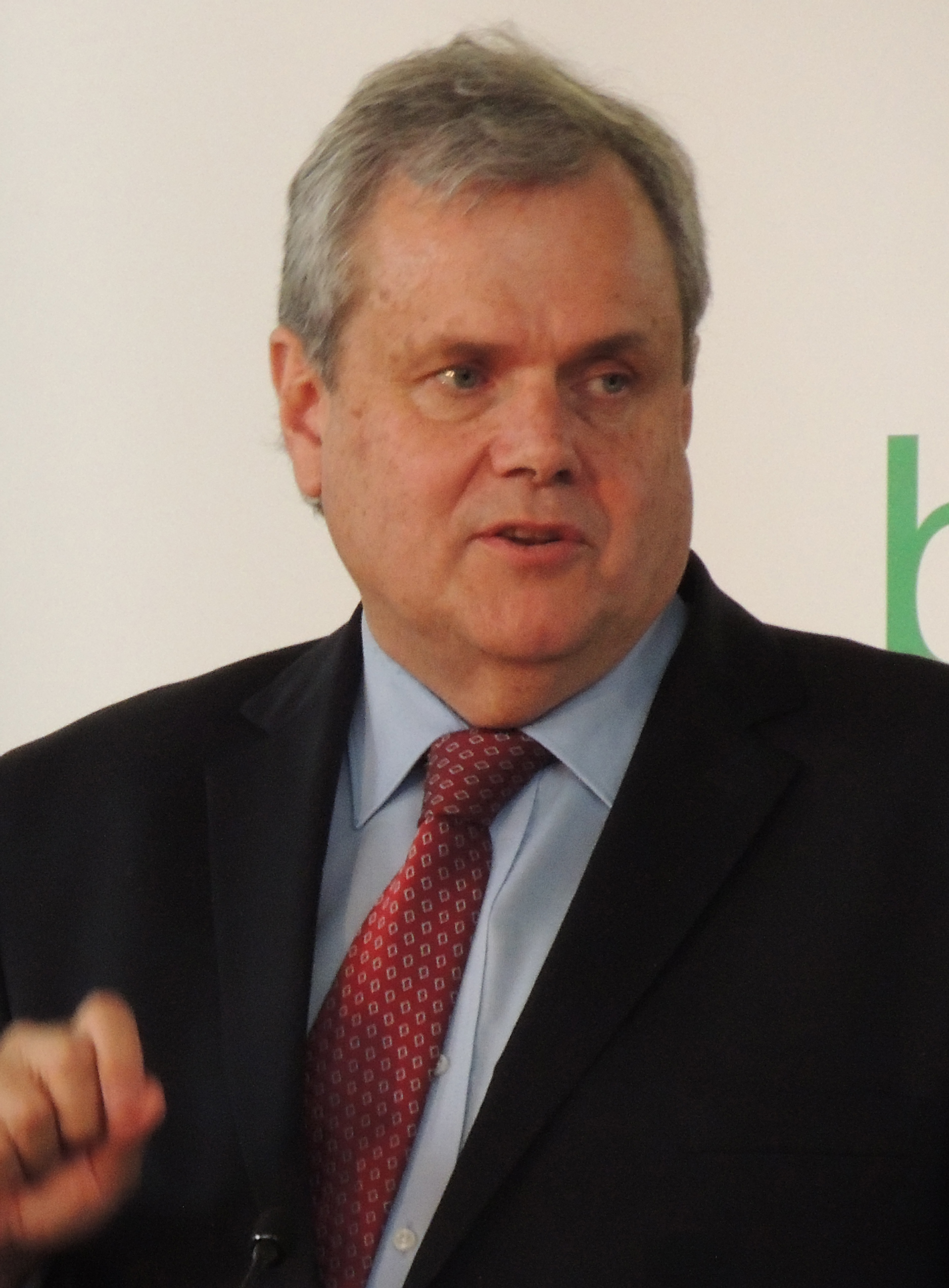
Paul Heithersay (2015)

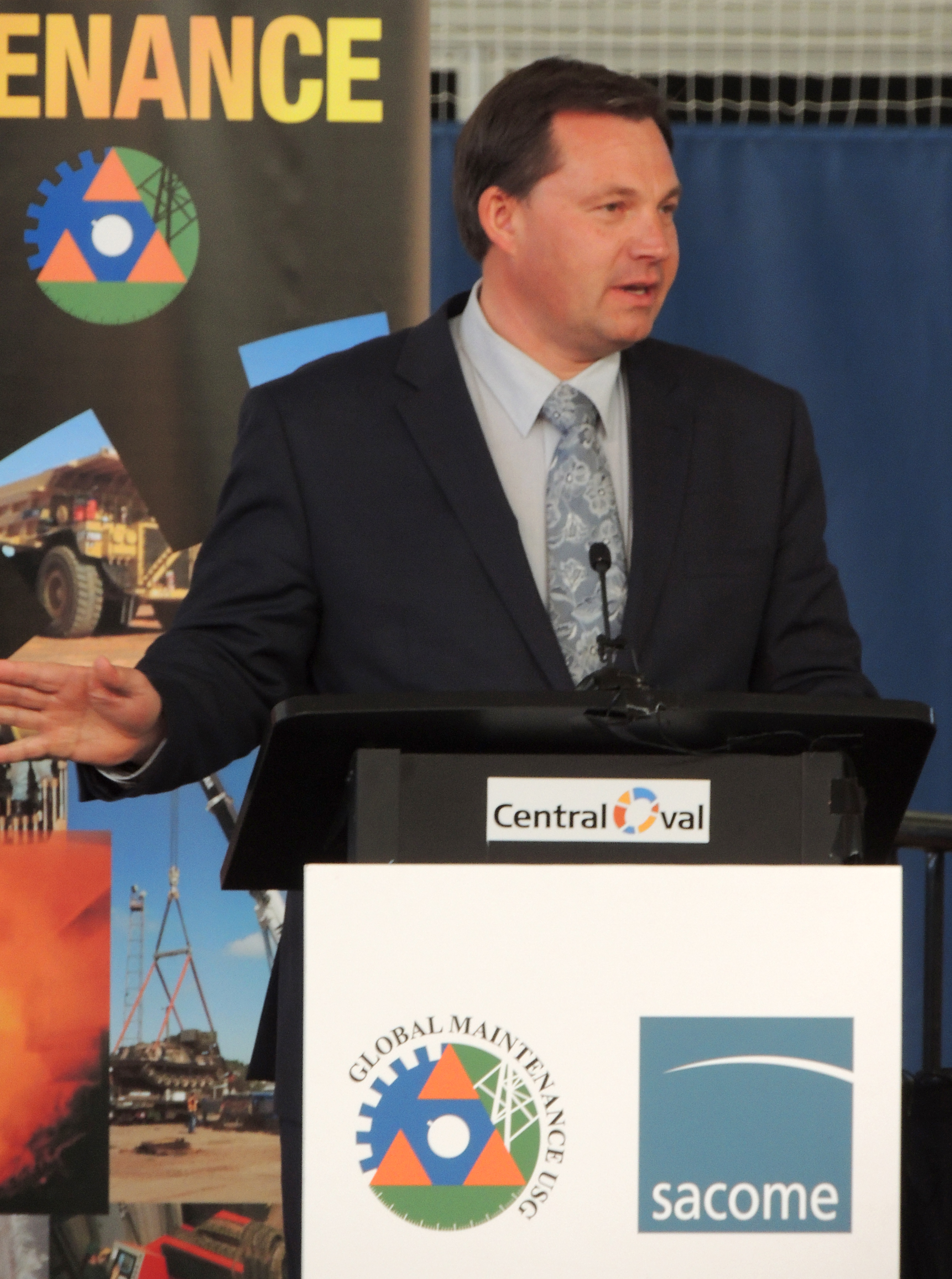
Jason Kuchel (2015)

Membership as of October 2014:

- Tino Guglielmo, Stuart Petroleum
- Bruce Carter, Ferrier Hodgson
- John Roberts, South Australian Chamber of Mines & Energy
- Jason Kuchel, South Australian Chamber of Mines & Energy
- David Cruickshanks-Boyd, Parsons Brinckerhoff
- Paul Heithersay, PIRSA
- Darryl Cuzzubbo, BHP Billiton

== Former members ==
Past members of RESIC include the following:

- Paul J Dowd, Phoenix Copper
- Hans Umlauff, Iluka Resources
- Jim White, OneSteel & Centrex Metals
- Jim Hallion, Department of Transport, Energy & Infrastructure
- Brian Cunningham, Department of Trade & Economic Development
- Rod Hook, Department of Transport, Energy & Infrastructure
- Dean Dalla Valle, BHP Billiton
- Lewis Owens, Country Arts Trust & SA Water
- Merrill Gray, Syngas Limited
- Lance Worrall, Department Trade and Economic Development
- Trish White, Worley Parsons
- Mick Wilkes, Oz Minerals
- Reg Nelson, Beach Energy
- Raymond Garrand, Government of South Australia
