= Minerals and Energy Advisory Council =

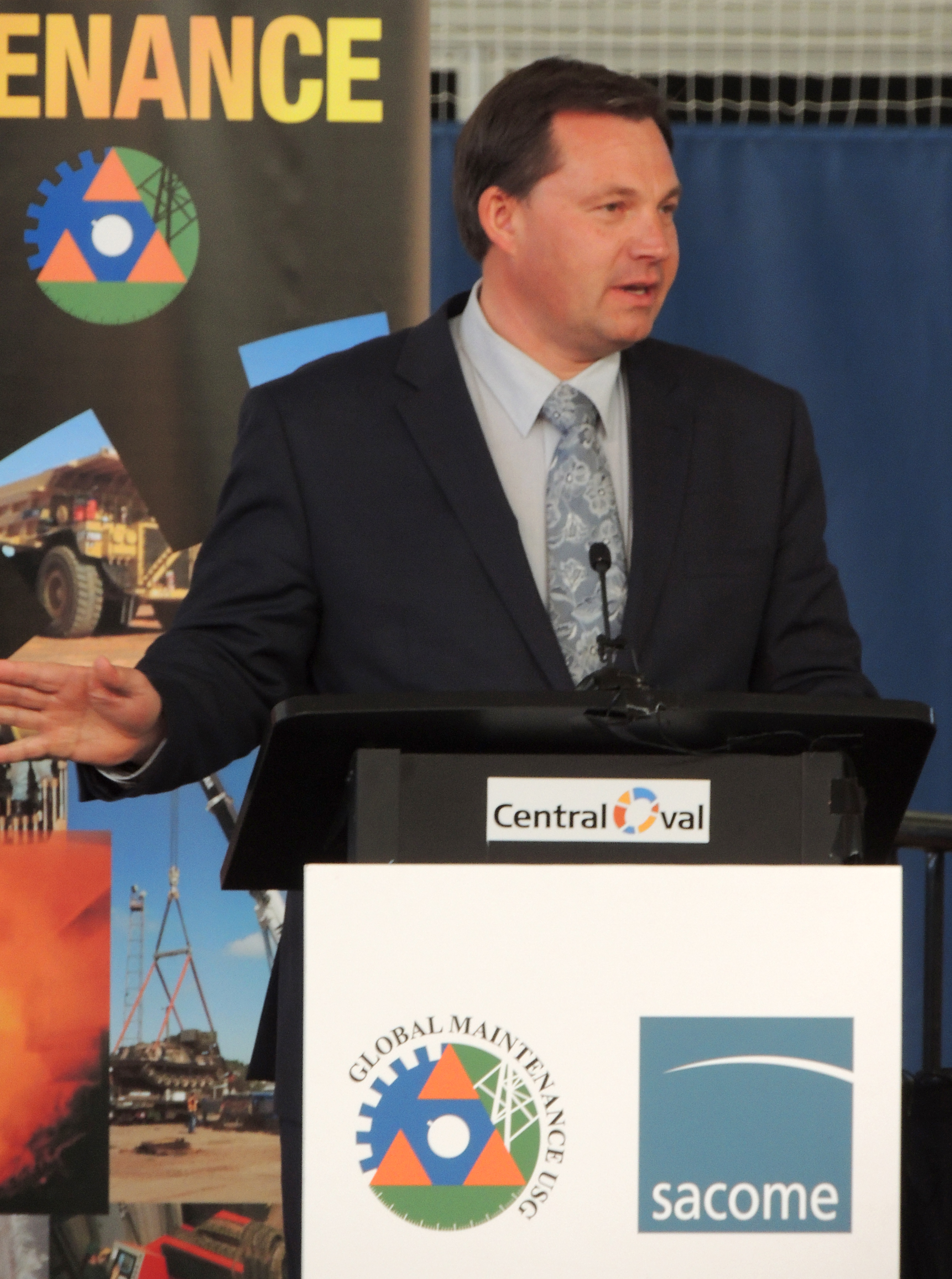
Jason Kuchel

The Minerals and Energy Advisory Council is an entity which represents the interests of resources and energy companies to the Government of South Australia. It was formed in 2015 in a merger of the Resources Industry Development Board and the Resources & Energy Sector Infrastructure Council. It is in a partnership with the Resources Infrastructure & Investment Task Force. In 2016, the MEAC discussed the future use of small modular nuclear reactors in South Australia and the need to legalise their deployment. The MEAC also prepared a report on the findings of the Nuclear Fuel Cycle Royal Commission to present to Minister Tom Koutantonis.

== Membership ==
As of May 2016 its members are:

Name	Affiliations
Keith Yates (Chair)	Adelaide Resources, South Australian Minerals & Petroleum Expert Group
Pauline Carr (Deputy Chair)	Newmont, University of South Australia
Derek Carter	Minotaur Exploration, Mithril Resources, Toro Energy, Petratherm
Ian Gould	Rio Tinto, CSIRO, South Australian Minerals & Petroleum Expert Group, Economic Development Board
Tino Guglielmo	Ambassador Oil & Gas
Alice McCleary	UraniumSA, Archer Exploration
George McKenzie	Finlaysons
John Roberts	South Australian Chamber of Mines & Energy, Mithril Resources, Rum Jungle Resources
Paul Holloway	Government of South Australia
John Anderson	Investigator Resources
Andrew Cole	Oz Minerals, Rio Tinto
Jason Kuchel	South Australian Chamber of Mines & Energy
Andrea Marsland-Smith	Heathgate Resources, International Atomic Energy Agency, Minerals Council of Australia Uranium Forum
Stedman Ellis	Australian Energy Producers, BHP
David Cruickshanks-Boyd	Engineers Australia, Parsons Brinkerhoff
Jacqui McGill	BHP
Kathryn Presser	Beach Energy
Matthew Reed	Arrium
Brett Woods	Santos, Australian Energy Producers
