= Finlaysons =

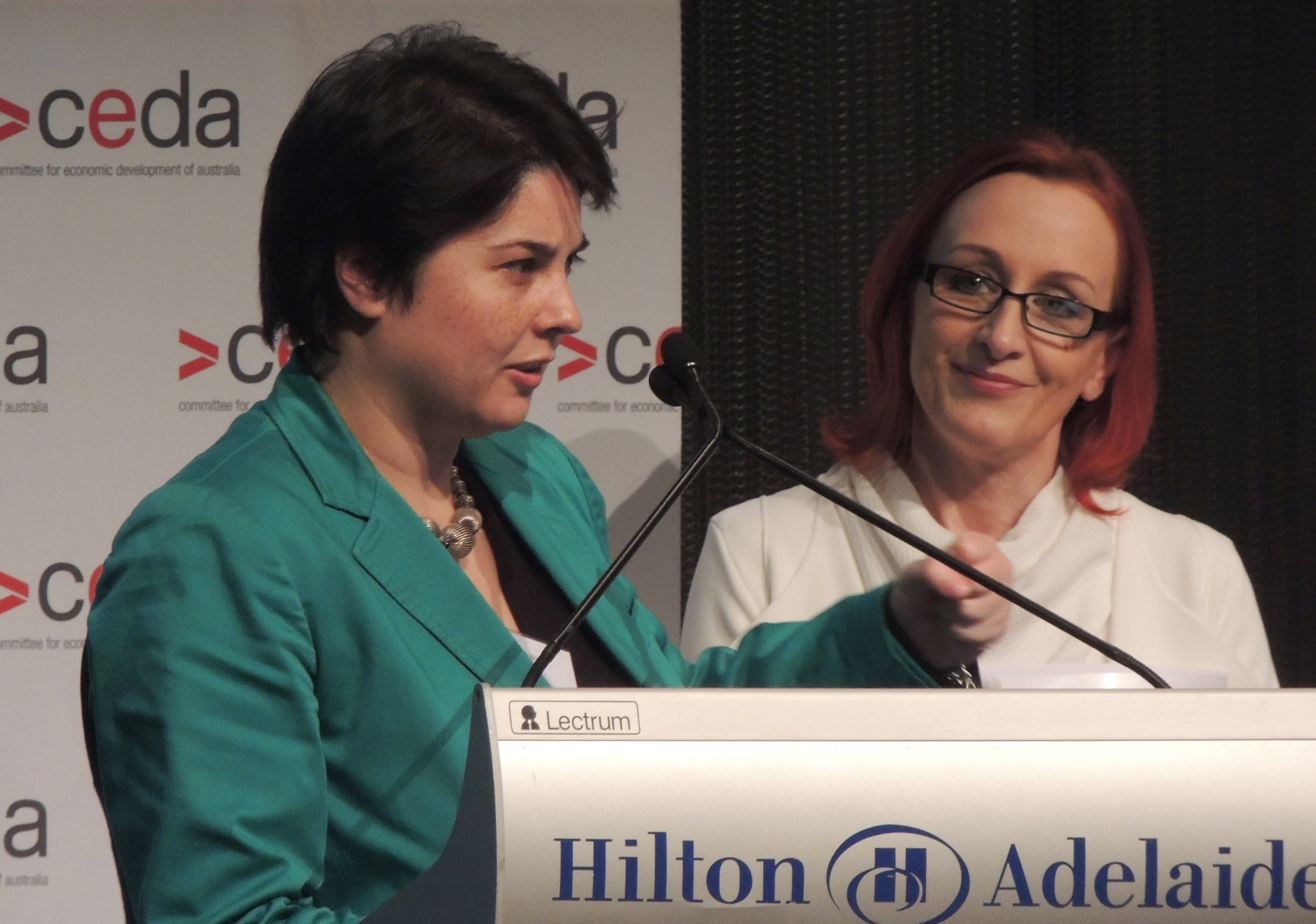
Kyra Reznikov speaks at CEDA event in Adelaide (2016)

Finlaysons is an Australian commercial law firm with offices in Adelaide and Darwin.

== History ==
The firm began in 1851, under the name Ayers & Ayers. The name Finlayson has been part of the firm since 1918. It became Finlayson & Co in 1959, and was simplified to Finlaysons in 1981. In October 2013, the firm had around 155 employees, including 25 partners, 17 senior associates and four special counsel.

== Affiliations ==
The firm is both a corporate member and event sponsor of the Committee for Economic Development of Australia, the Australian Institute of Company Directors and Family Business Australia. The firm is also a sponsor of the Australasian Land and Groundwater Association and Special Counsel Kyra Reznikov sits on its Adelaide branch committee. As of 2016, Finlaysons is a gold sponsor of the South Australian Chamber of Mines and Energy (SACOME).

== Memberships ==
Reznikov is also a member of the South Australian Chamber of Mines and Energy's Women in Resources South Australia committee, and Finlaysons Partner George McKenzie is also a Councillor of SACOME. He is also a member of the Minerals and Energy Advisory Council which advises the Government of South Australia directly. He was also a member of its predecessor, the Resources Industry Development Board prior to 2015. McKenzie is also a member of the Australian Geothermal Energy Association's Regulatory Sub-committee. Finlaysons has also been a sponsor of the Paydirt Uranium Conference.

== See also ==
- Herbert Geer
- Mills Oakley
