= Resources Industry Development Board =

The Resources Industry Development Board (RIDB) was formed in 2000 to enhance the growth of the state of South Australia's mineral and petroleum resources sector and its contribution to the state's economy. It was formed in response to recommendations of the Resources Task Force made the previous year. The RIDB provided advice to the Minister for Mineral Resources and Energy and the state government. There was a high degree of inter-activity with the Primary Industries and Regions SA (PIRSA) Division of Minerals and Energy which also provided the Board's secretariat.

In 2015, the RIDB merged with the Resources & Energy Sector Infrastructure Council (RESIC), forming the Minerals & Energy Advisory Council.

== Objectives ==
As of 2014, the board's key objectives were:

1. Making land more accessible
2. Stimulating vibrant exploration activity
3. Expediting sustainable development, production and processing

== Achievements ==
During its first five years, the RIDB successfully engaged the Economic Development Board to raise the profile of the resources sector. In 2004, this resulted in the sector being recognised as one of the four key potential growth areas in the state's Second Economic Summit. The resources sector was not mentioned at the First Economic Summit. The RIDB also met with the Minister for Environment and Conservation, Hon John Hill to highlight key issues for the resources industry. These included increasing access to parks and reserves and the management of zones within reserves.

The RIDB developed a strategy for the targeted promotion of the sector to opinion leaders and corporate decision makers. The project aimed to identify and engage people who influence community opinion to alter the community's perception of the resources industry. The targets of the strategy included church leaders, sporting identities, councils, business leaders, service and community organisations, politicians, bureaucrats, media personalities, unions and conservation groups.

== Membership ==
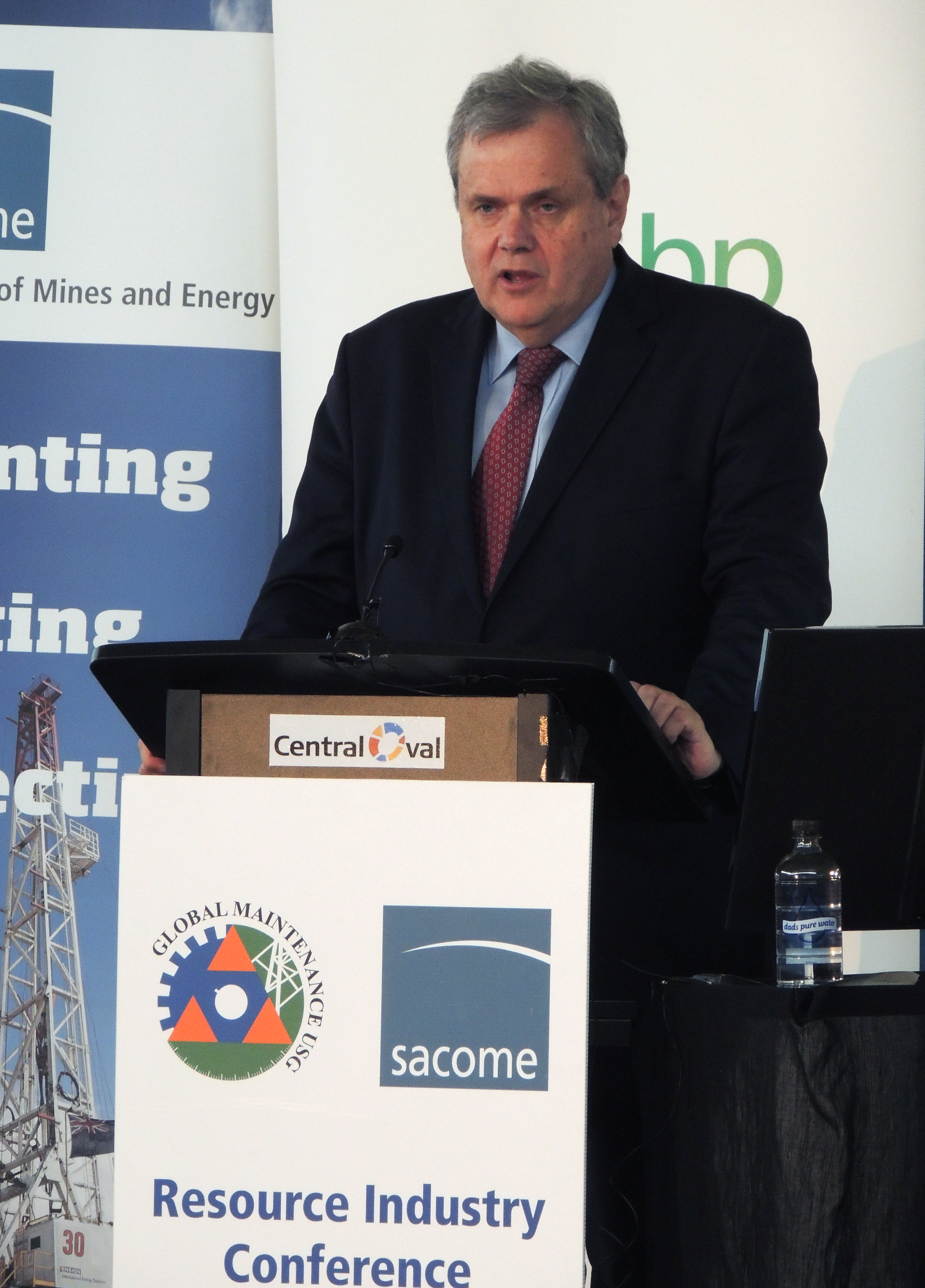
Paul Heithersay (2015)

In 2014, members of the Board (and their relevant industry affiliations) included:

- Keith Yates - Adelaide Resources
- Dr Paul Heithersay
- Dr Ian Gould - Rio Tinto & University of South Australia
- Roger Goldsworthy
- George McKenzie - Finlaysons
- Tino Guglielmo - Ambassador Oil & Gas, ex Stuart Petroleum
- John Roberts - South Australian Chamber of Mines & Energy
- Derek Carter - Petratherm, Mithril Resources, Blackthorne Resources
- Pauline Carr - Grange Resources
- Richard Yeeles - BHP & Toro Energy
- Alice McCleary - Archer Exploration & Uranium SA
- Hon Paul Holloway

== Former members ==
Former members of the RIDB include:

- Dave Cockshell - PIRSA Petroleum
- Parry Agius - Indigenous consultant
- Dr Jan Carey - Marine Biologist
- Barry Goldstein (ex officio)
- Annette Hurley - Labor Party
- Peter Klaosen - Santos
- Ted Tyne (ex officio)
- Tahlia Wanganeen
- Jim White - Onesteel & Centrex Metals
