= Kyra Reznikov =

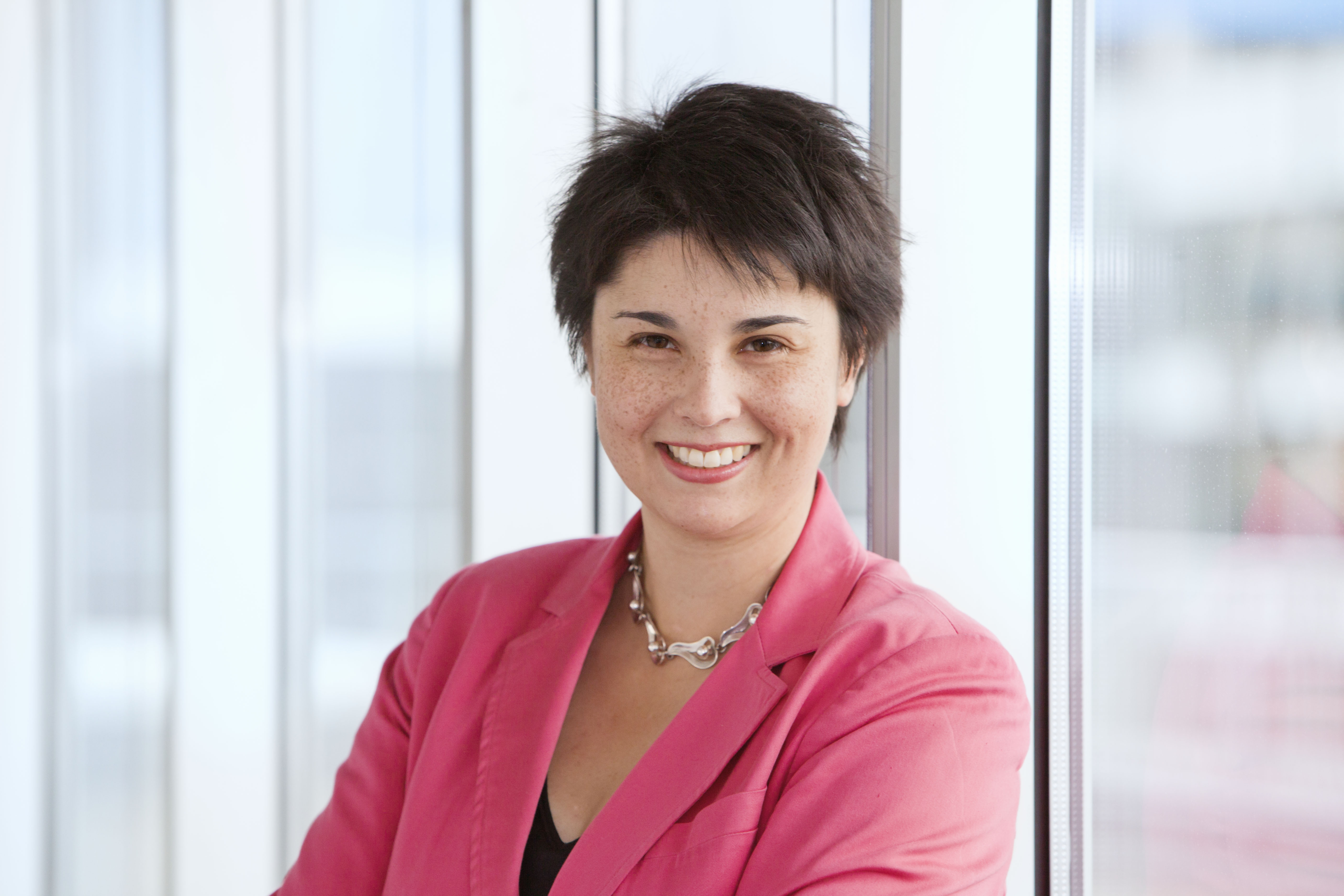
Kyra Reznikov (2016)

Kyra Reznikov (born 1979) is a South Australian commercial lawyer and Special Counsel at legal firm Finlaysons.

== Career ==
As a child, Reznikov attended Annesley College where she demonstrated an early aptitude for science. She won the Mark Oliphant Science Award in 1995. After graduating from high school, she attended the University of Adelaide, where she obtained degrees in law and chemical engineering with first class honors. She went on to practise law at Finlaysons.

In 2010, Reznikov was recognised by Doyle’s Guide to the Australian Legal Profession as one of the Top 20 "rising stars of Planning and Environmental Law" in Australia. The same year, she was working as a Senior Associate for the firm. Her paper "Fracture Stimulation – legal risks and liabilities" was published in the Proceedings of the 2010 Australian Geothermal Energy Conference. By 2013, Reznikov had accrued ten years experience as a legal professional and was managing environmental law at Finlaysons.

She has worked with oil and gas company Santos Ltd, ExxonMobil (the former Port Stanvac refinery), the Boyne Island aluminium smelter in Queensland and the Bell Bay aluminium smelter in Tasmania. Reznikov is a regular presenter at resources and energy sector conferences. In 2014, she was first recognised by Best Lawyers Australia for Planning and Environmental Law. As of 2016, Reznikov's work for the resources sector focuses on "planning approvals and tenement applications, environmental impact assessment, compliance, water access, tenure and management of carbon costs."

In April 2016, Reznikov joined a delegation organised by the Committee for Adelaide which visited a number of nuclear waste storage facilities in Europe. Since her return in May, she has spoken on the topic at a number of private events, including the AusIMM Uranium Conference and smaller events hosted by the South Australian Chamber of Mines and Energy and the Law Society of South Australia. Her AusIMM conference presentation was entitled "Opportunities and Challenges for Nuclear Fuel Cycle Participation – Learnings from Finland, France and the UK".

Reznikov is also a member of the South Australian Chamber of Mines and Energy's Women in Resources South Australia committee.

In 2014-15, Reznikov was a rostered lawyer with the Environmental Defenders Office South Australia.
