= Olympic Dam mine =

Poly-metallic underground mine in South Australia

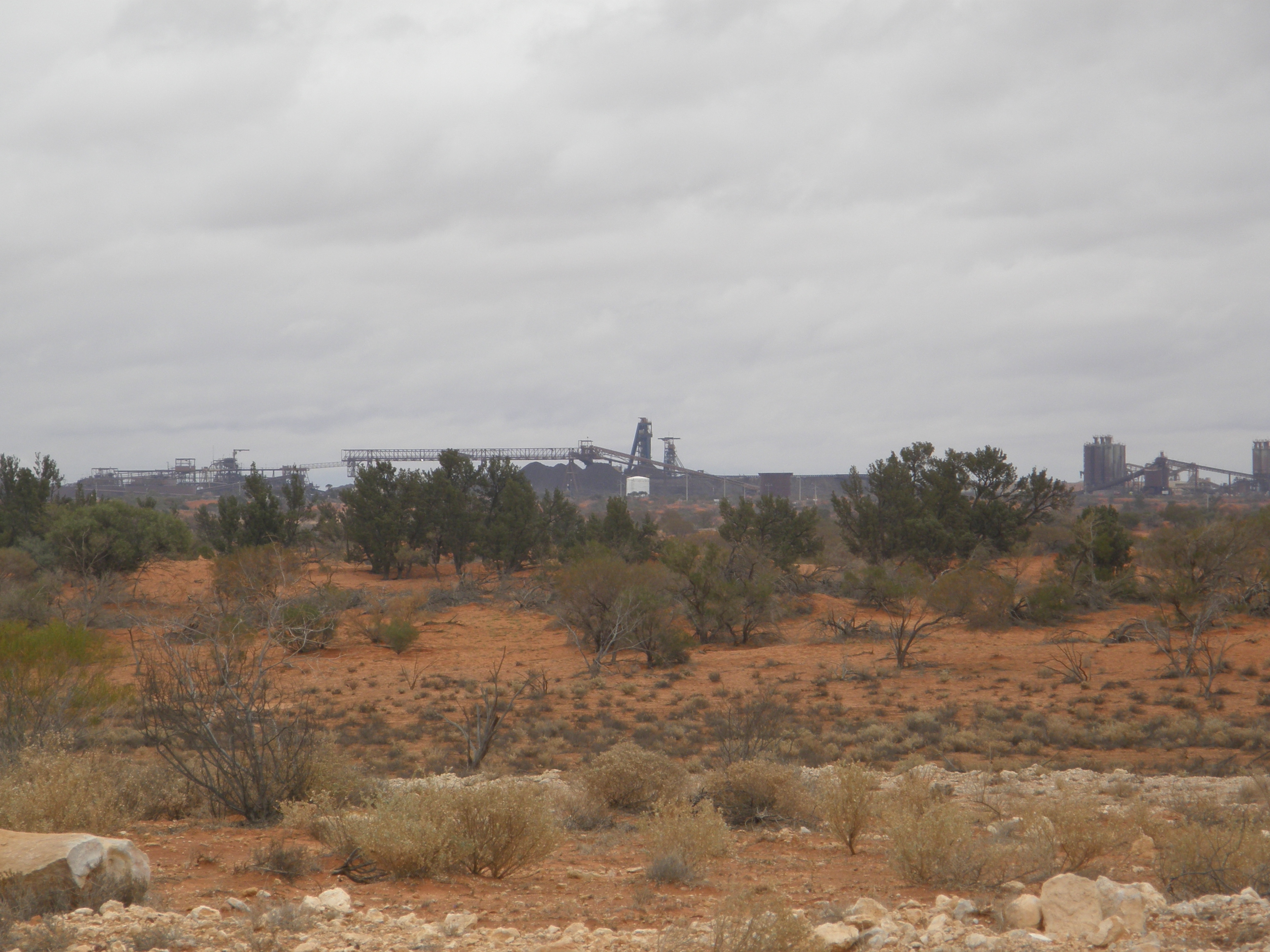
- Clarke and Robinson shafts (centre)

- Location in Australia
- Location: Olympic Dam, South Australia, Australia; 30°26′24″S 136°52′23″E
- Products: copper uranium oxide gold silver
- Type: Underground
- Discovered: 1975
- Opened: 1988
- Company: BHP
- Acquired: 2005

The Olympic Dam mine is a large poly-metallic underground mine located in South Australia, 550 km (340 mi) NNW of Adelaide. It is the fourth largest copper deposit and the largest known single deposit of uranium in the world. Copper is the largest contributor to total revenue, accounting for approximately 70% of the mine's revenue, with the remaining 25% from uranium, and around 5% from silver and gold. BHP has owned and operated the mine since 2005. The mine was previously owned by Western Mining Corporation. Since the 1970s environmentalists, traditional owners and others have campaigned against the mine, largely on the basis of its contribution to the nuclear cycle and its use of underground water.

Since it opened in 1988, an extensive underground mine, an integrated metallurgical processing plant and expansive open-air tailings storage facilities have been constructed. The adjacent Olympic Dam mining centre and the nearby township of Roxby Downs service the mine and accommodate its workforce. Daily flights to and from Adelaide are provided via the Olympic Dam Airport.

BHP planned to expand the mine by establishing a new open cut pit and building extensive supporting infrastructure. In 2012 the expansion was postponed indefinitely pending investigation of a "new and cheaper design".

== Scale of production ==
As of 2013, Olympic Dam is the second largest uranium-producing mine in the world, having produced 4,100 tonnes (4,000 long tons; 4,500 short tons) of uranium metal in the financial year ending June 2013. The only larger producer is the McArthur River uranium mine in Canada. Given the energy density of uranium, this quantity is equal to a heating value of 820 TWh (equivalent to 705.5 megatonnes of TNT (2,952 PJ)) at a CANDU-typical burnup of 200 MWh_{thermal}/kg. Other reactor types which require uranium enrichment will recover slightly different amounts of heat from this amount of uranium. For comparison to get the same amount of heat energy by burning coal (energy density ranging from 24 to 35 MJ/kg) one would need between 84.34 megatonnes (83,010,000 long tons; 92,970,000 short tons) and 123 megatonnes (121,000,000 long tons; 136,000,000 short tons) of coal depending on grade. The largest coal mine in the world, North Antelope Rochelle Mine in Wyoming, produced 85.3 megatonnes (84,000,000 long tons; 94,000,000 short tons) of coal in 2019 at a grade of 3,800 kilojoules per kilogram (1,600 BTU/lb) equivalent to roughly 3.24×10^{11} megajoules (9.0×10^{10} kWh) of heat energy.

== History ==
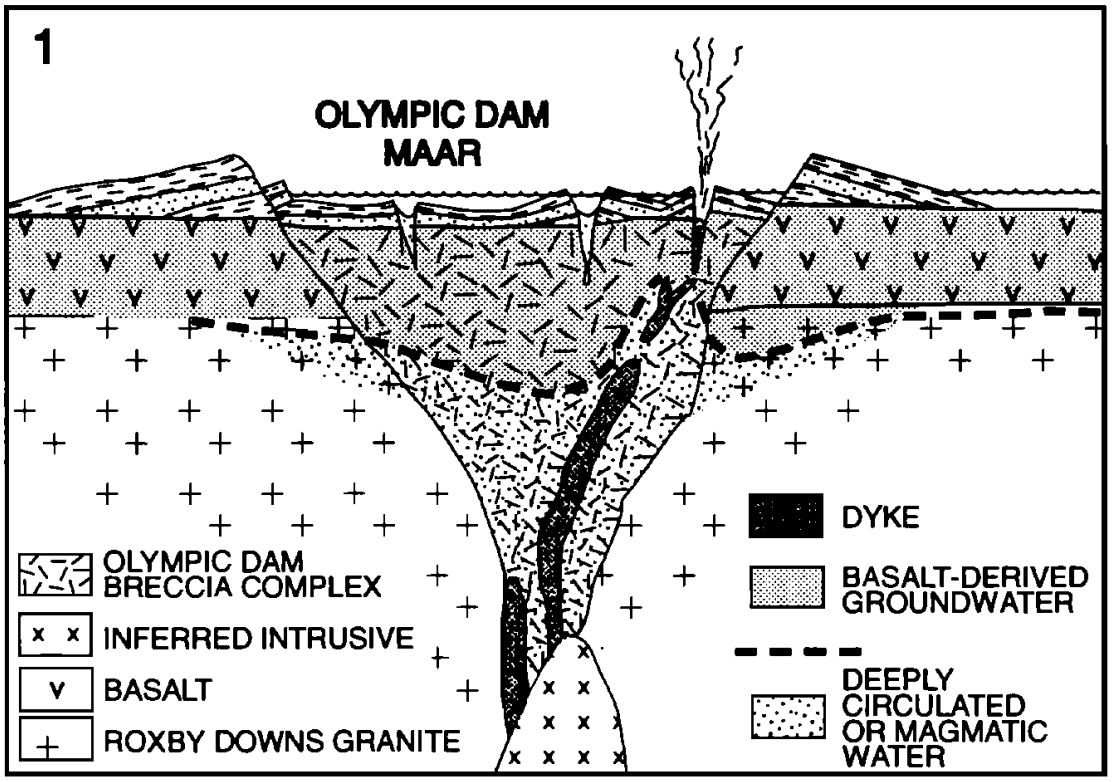
Olympic Dam phreatic stage diagram of the volcanogenic uranium deposit.

In 1979 a joint venture partnership was established between Western Mining Corporation and BP Minerals with the intention of establishing the mine. Three years later, the Roxby Downs (Indenture Ratification) Act 1982 was signed, creating a legal framework for the development to proceed. The first shaft was constructed that year, and named the Whenan Shaft after Ted Whenan, one of the exploration drillers who discovered the ore body. The new municipality of Roxby Downs was also established in 1982, as an intended service centre and community hub for the mine workers and their families. In 1983 and 1984 anti-uranium protests involving hundreds of people were held at the mine site and a vigil maintained. In 1983, the mine's first Environmental Impact Statement was approved, authorising copper production of up to 150,000 tonnes per annum. Over a decade would pass before this production target was achieved.

In 1987, a decline entrance to the mine was created, and the Olympic Dam Special Mining Lease was connected to the South Australian electricity grid. The mine was officially opened the following year, and the first shipments of copper cathodes and uranium oxide were made. Roxby Downs township was officially opened, and the town's newspaper, the Roxby Downs Sun commenced publication. In 1989, the Olympic Dam refinery produced its first gold and silver bars.

In 1993, Western Mining Corporation bought BP's 49% shareholding and assumed total control of the project. Several stages of expansion occurred around this time and production increased. In 1986, the mine's target production had been set at 45,000 tonnes of copper per annum. In 1992, output reached 66,000 tonnes, then 84,000 in 1995.

The mine's first major expansion was announced in 1996 with the objective of producing 200,000 tonnes per annum once complete. A second Environmental Impact Statement was approved, allowing the mine to expand production up to 350,000 tonnes of copper per annum.

In 1998 the mine poured its 500th bar of gold. Two years later the mine produced 200,000 tonnes of copper in a year for the first time. Optimisation efforts increased output to 235,000 tonnes per annum in 2002.

BHP made a successful bid for Western Mining Corporation in March 2005 and the offer was accepted by the Australian Competition & Consumer Commission in April. BHP Billiton was not the only resources company to express interest in the project. Xstrata had made prior takeover bids in late 2004, and French state-run nuclear industrial company Areva had entered into what were rumoured to be partnership discussions with WMC Resources in February.

After the acquisition, BHP began to plan what would become a proposed $30 billion expansion project, involving the excavation of a new open cut mine within the existing Special Mining Lease. The expansion plan was expected to be a boon to the South Australian economy- forecast to generate an estimated 23,000 direct and indirect jobs. Major new infrastructure would need to be constructed to facilitate the expansion, including a new airport at Olympic Dam, a rail link, a seawater desalination plant at Point Lowly, a barge-landing facility near Port Augusta and a worker village near Andamooka.

The company's access to the Government of South Australia was enhanced by the formation of the Olympic Dam Task Force in 2006, which has since served as a single entry-point for the company's interactions with the state. BHP also began to develop relationships with scientific and academic institutions with the objective of facilitating relevant technical, environmental and policy research.

== Research sponsorship and partnerships ==
Academic research related to the Olympic Dam mine and funded by BHP Billiton has been undertaken by at least four major South Australian institutions since the take-over. Works have included producing a projection of future skill requirements for Olympic Dam by Flinders University, research into novel "liquid mining" techniques conducted by a team at the South Australian Museum, numerous studies at the Environment Institute and Institute for Mineral and Energy Resources (IMER) at the University of Adelaide and numerous more at the Ian Wark Research Institute at the University of South Australia.

In 2008, the Ian Wark Research Institute entered a research partnership with BHP. The company committed to provide $500,000 per annum for five consecutive years for research programs. The institute's annual report that year referred to BHP Billiton as having had a representative on their advisory board for "many years". In 2012, the Institute for Mineral and Energy Resources at the University of Adelaide was awarded over $2.5 million as part of the Australian Research Council's Industrial Transformation Program. Funds were to be spent over six years during the establishment of a research hub for advancing copper-uranium production. BHP Billiton partnered with IMER on the project and is providing $2.5 million in cash plus additional in-kind contributions.

BHP executives have also held numerous board memberships within academic institutions since the Olympic Dam take-over. Andrew Shook, general manager of BHP Billiton's Uranium Customer Sector Group, held a position on the advisory board of the Ian Wark Research Institute from 2009 to 2011, and Robert Sumner held a position as an adjunct senior research fellow there for the same period. John England, the vice president of technology, Uranium Customer Sector Group at BHP Billiton, was appointed to the advisory board of IMER from its establishment in 2009 until 2014. President of Uranium Dean Dalla Valle also held a position on the IMER advisory board in 2009 to 2010 and another on the board of the South Australian Museum from 2011 to 2012. Vice President Sustainability at BHP Billiton, Carl Binning, has held a position on the Board of the Environment Institute since at least 2011. He ceased working for BHP Billiton in 2012 but continues to hold his board position.

== Industry associations ==
BHP Olympic Dam is a member of the World Nuclear Association, whose mission is "to promote a wider understanding of nuclear energy among key international influencers by producing authoritative information, developing common industry positions, and contributing to the energy debate." BHP Billiton is also a full member of the Minerals Council of Australia's Uranium Forum, where the interests of the Olympic Dam project are represented.

== Sponsorships ==
BHP sponsors a variety of events and organisations. Some are directly linked to the company's uranium portfolio, which is exclusively represented by the Olympic Dam mine. In 2016, BHP Billiton was the major sponsor of the Australian Radiation Protection Society's (ARPS) 2016 Conference, held in Adelaide. Tours of the Olympic Dam mine have also been offered to delegates of uranium and mining industry conferences held in South Australia.

== Proposed expansion ==
At the time of the BHP takeover, WMC Resources was investigating ways to expand the mine, including considering constructing a prospective seawater desalination plant at Port Bonython (Point Lowly).

In 2008, BHP completed a pre-feasibility study into the expansion of the mine's operations, with the first step of expansion scheduled for completion by late 2013. In December 2008, South Australia's Premier Mike Rann revealed advice from BHP that the project would proceed as an open-cut operation.

While being welcomed at the time by state and federal governments as a major boost to the economy, the proposed expansion of mining operations also attracted considerable criticism. In 2007, BHP Billiton attracted public attention for delaying the release of its environmental impact statement for the Olympic Dam expansion, and for the company's response to inconsistencies in the scope and configuration of the proposed expansion.

In May 2009, the company released an extensive environmental impact statement for public comment. It revealed the detailed plans for the proposed construction and its future operation. Among the project's new infrastructure requirements were: a desalination plant at Point Lowly (Port Bonython), a rail link to Pimba, a worker accommodation village between Olympic Dam and Andamooka and a barge landing facility near Port Augusta.

In May 2011, the company released a Supplementary Environmental Impact Statement in response to the 4,197 submissions received during a 14-week public comment period.

On 10 October 2011, state and federal government approvals for the mine expansion were granted.The approvals to develop the mine into an open pit configuration and build a seawater desalination plant lapsed, and the mine continued to operate normally.

As of 2026, BHP intends to source its water from the proposed Northern Water Project which could produce water from upper Spencer Gulf by seawater desalination in 2032 if approvals are granted and the project advances.

== Seawater desalination at Point Lowly ==
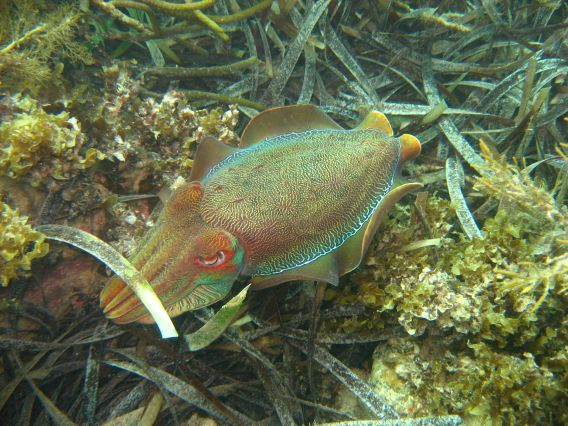
The Point Lowly cuttlefish aggregation may be impacted by Olympic Dam desalination plant brine.

Seawater desalination had been considered by Western Mining Corporation as early as 1997, but at that time it was considered to be neither economically nor environmentally viable. By 2005, Western Mining Corporation had revisited the possibility of seawater desalination from upper Spencer Gulf. A pre-feasibility study was underway at the time of the BHP Billiton takeover, and was completed by the project's new owners.

In order to meet the project's increasing demand for water, the BHP Billiton expansion plan proposed to construct a large-scale reverse osmosis seawater desalination plant at Point Lowly in upper Spencer Gulf. The water would then be pumped over 300 km north to the Olympic Dam mine site and Roxby Downs township. The proposed plant's location remains controversial due to the proximity of the proposed brine discharge to critical breeding habitat for the Giant Australian Cuttlefish, which are sensitive to increases in ocean salinity.

In August 2009, a South Australian parliamentary committee recommended that BHP Billiton investigate alternative locations for the proposed plant after concluding that brine could harm the marine ecology of upper Spencer Gulf.

In 2010 and 2011, three petitions (signed by a total of 910 South Australians) were tabled in the Parliament of South Australia calling for the relocation of the proposed desalination plant, so that it would discharge brine into an oceanic environment rather than into Spencer Gulf.

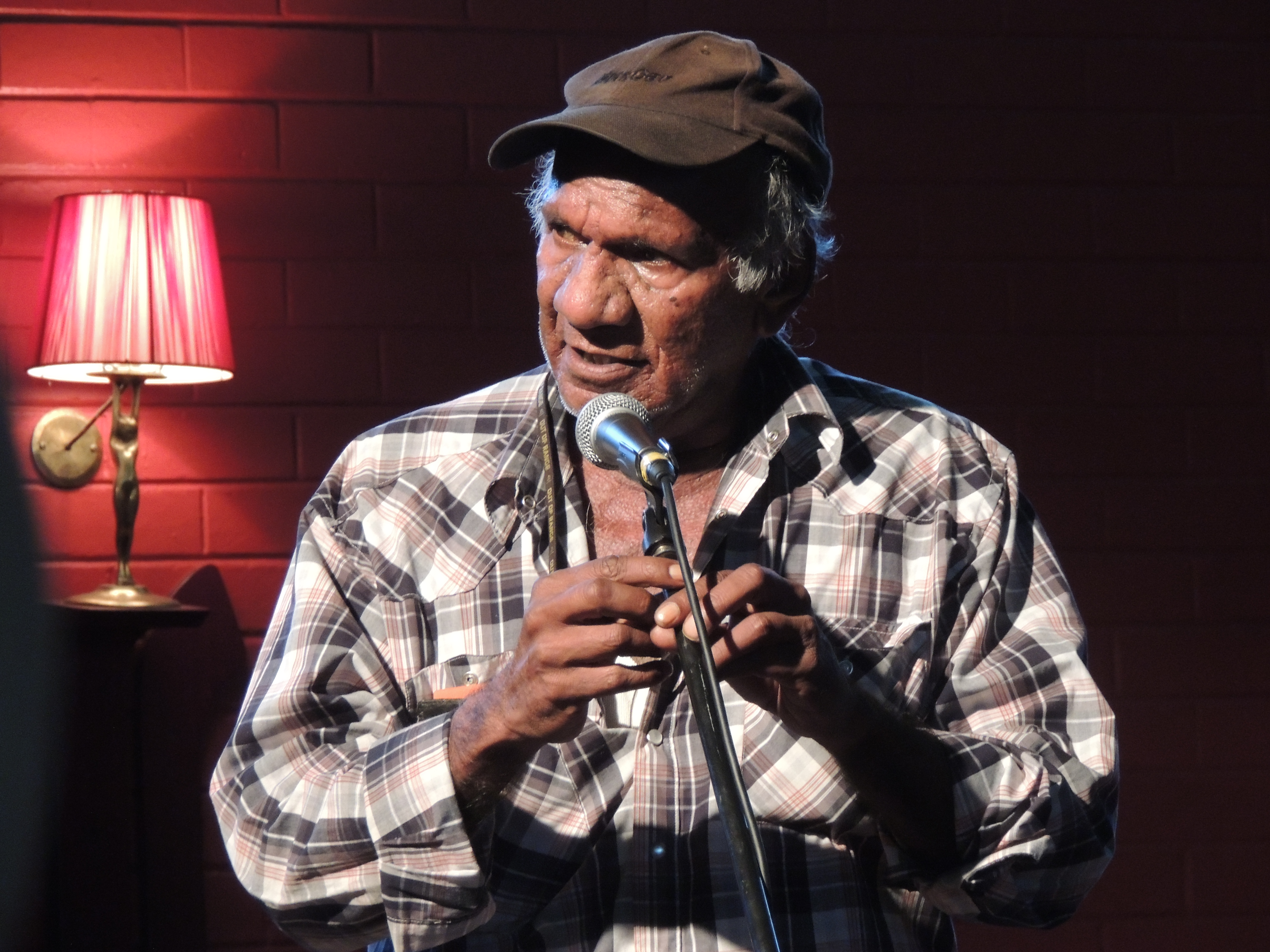
Kevin Buzzacott

In February 2012, Arabana elder Kevin Buzzacott legally challenged the Commonwealth Environment Minister Tony Burke's environmental approval of the Olympic Dam mine expansion. Buzzacott was represented by the Environmental Defenders' Office and appeared in the Federal Court in Adelaide on 3 and 4 April 2012. His case was dismissed on 20 April 2012. An appeal of the judge's decision in 2013 was also unsuccessful.

In July 2012, more than 400 people joined the "Lizard's Revenge" protest at the Olympic Dam site. The anti-nuclear activists, including Buzzacott, protested against the mine expansion and the uranium industry. They say the company and the government have put short-term economic gain ahead of environmental and health concerns. Organiser Nectaria Calan said police harassed protesters, demanding identification and controlling access to and from their campsite.

The original development of the mine also attracted public opposition from Australia's anti-nuclear movement. Hundreds of arrests occurred at and around the mine site during a variety of actions and demonstrations in 1983 and 1984. The protesters alleged that they had been provoked by police and that they had been unfairly represented as the antagonists in various media reports.

In August 2012, BHP Billiton announced that the expansion was being postponed indefinitely pending investigation of a "new and cheaper design". The South Australian Mineral Resources and Energy Minister, Tom Koutsantonis in response to this announcement stated "they will be developed (and) it will bring a great deal of prosperity." However the Premier, Jay Weatherill, warned BHP "given that this is the second time they have disappointed South Australians, there can be no doubt that this community permission will come at a (greater) cost" next time. Eight months later, the service town of Roxby Downs was reportedly "in a slump".

In December 2013, the federal government expressed its support for the revival of the Olympic Dam expansion project. The announcements were made in the wake of news that Holden would be ceasing its car production operations in South Australia in 2017. Members of South Australia's business community believe that the state's future prosperity should not be dependent on the Olympic Dam expansion proceeding and have expressed the need for Government to support a diversified economy.

In September 2014, environmental approval was received for heap-leaching trials to commence at the mine in an effort to reduce processing costs.

In 2015, the Olympic Dam mine's workforce began a staged contraction in company-wide efforts to reduce operating costs. A review of the workforce was announced in January. Since the review commenced, 50 contractor positions were shed in March and 140 jobs were lost in June. A spokesperson from BHP Billiton told Australian Mining:

"All areas of our business, including labour productivity, are being examined. A review is currently progressing in our operational areas and we expect there will be further workforce reductions".

== Operations ==
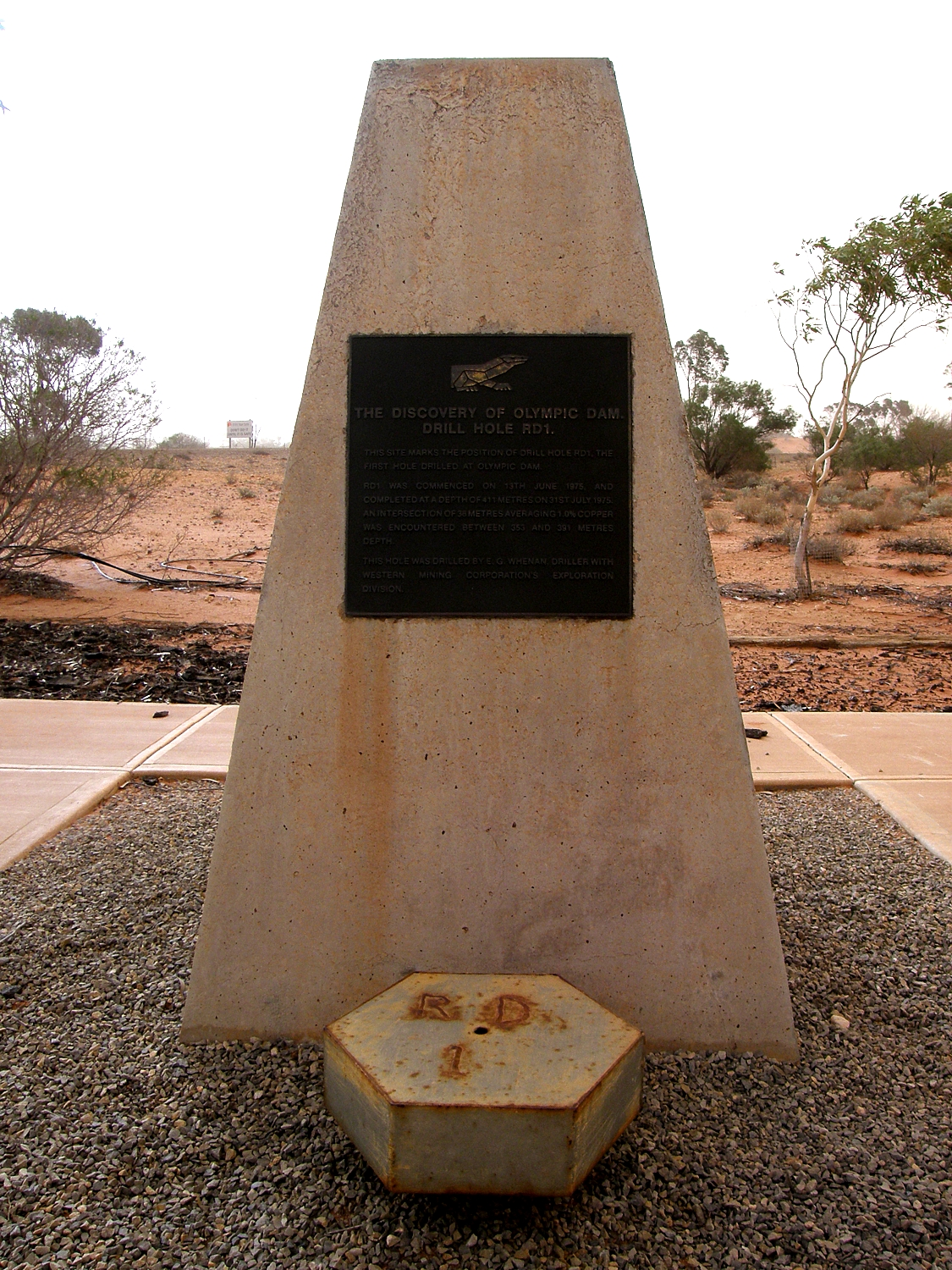
Monument at the discovery hole of Olympic Dam, RD1

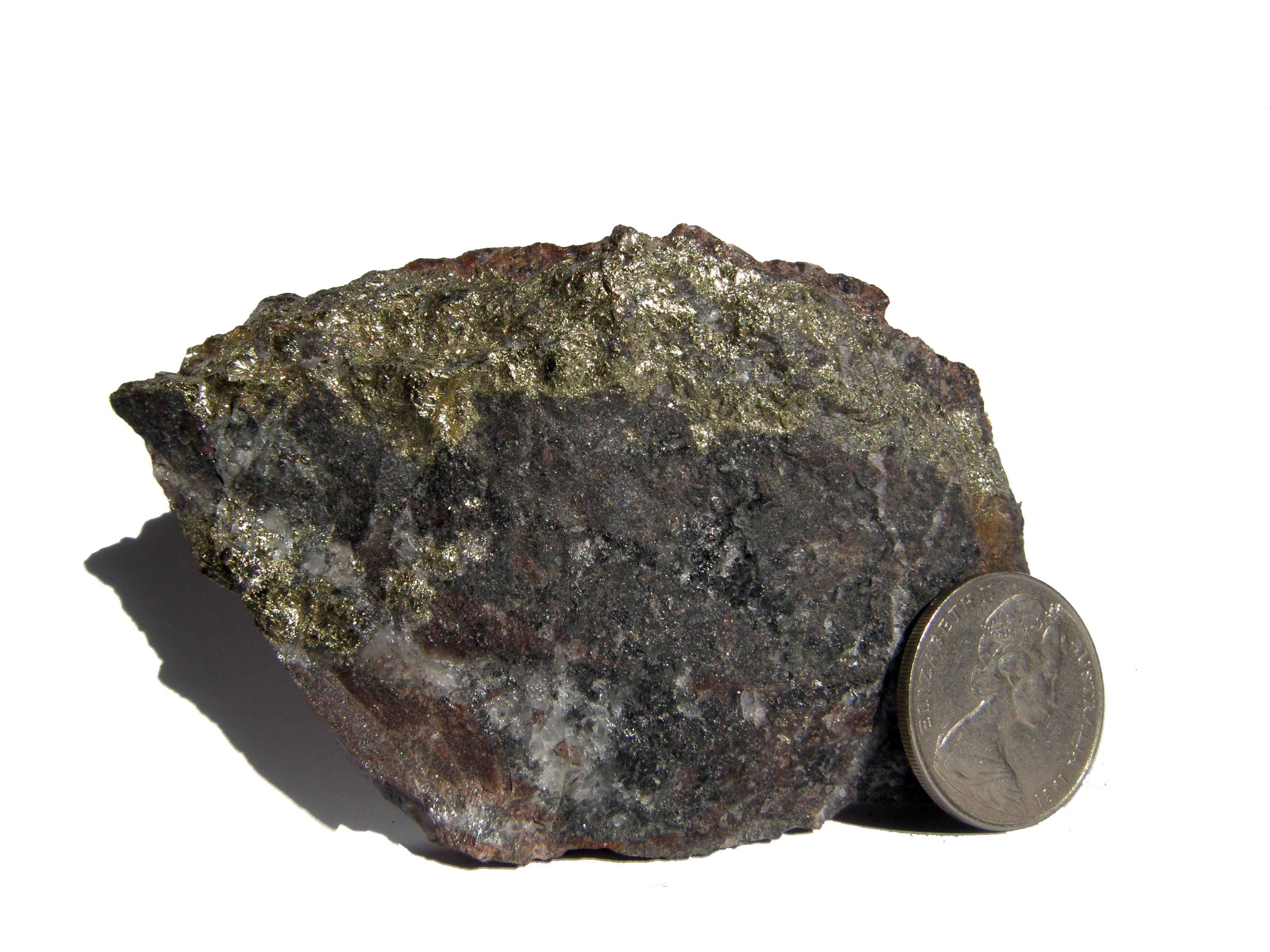
Chalcopyrite-rich ore specimen from Olympic Dam

=== Underground mine ===
The Olympic Dam mine works an extremely large iron oxide copper gold deposit with estimated reserves of 2.95 billion tonnes of ore grading 1.2% copper, 0.04% uranium, .5 g/t of gold and 6 g/t of silver.

The deposit was originally discovered by Western Mining Corporation in 1975 near Roxby Downs Sheep Station and production officially commenced in 1988. It now belongs to BHP, which acquired WMC Resources in 2005. The mine currently operates by an underground mining method called sublevel open stoping, using modern and highly productive mining equipment. The March 2005 mine production rate is an annualised 9.1 million tonnes making it one of Australia's larger mines. 2005 metal production is thought to be in excess of 220,000 tonnes of copper, 4500 tonnes of uranium oxide, plus gold and silver. The copper and uranium oxide are exported through Port Adelaide. Most of the mine workers live in the nearby towns of Roxby Downs and Andamooka. Regular flights between Adelaide and the Olympic Dam Airport serve the mine project.

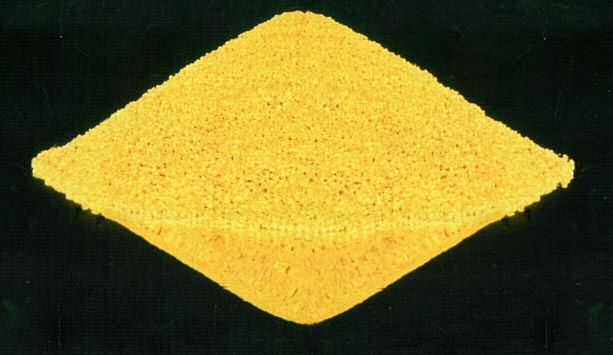
Yellowcake

=== Uranium production ===
The production of uranium at Olympic dam accounts for approximately 25% of the mine's revenue. Since 2013, Olympic Dam has been Australia's largest producer of uranium oxide or 'yellowcake'.

Annual U_{3}O_{8} production at Olympic Dam
| Year | Tonnes U_{3}O_{8} |
|---|---|
| 2006-07 | 3,474 |
| 2007-08 | 4,115 |
| 2008-09 | 3,974 |
| 2009-10 | 2,258 |
| 2010-11 | 4,012 |
| 2011-12 | 3,853 |
| 2012-13 | 4,064 |
| 2013-14 | 3,988 |
| 2014-15 | 3,144 |
| 2015-16 | 4,363 |
| 2016-17 | 3,661 |

=== Electricity supply ===
The Olympic Dam mine is South Australia's single largest consumer of electricity, and is connected (at 275kV) at end of the grid via Port Augusta, with a reserve 132kV line via Pimba. In 2009, BHP Billiton defined its typical annual electricity consumption as 870,000 MWh (or 125 MW). In 2009 and 2015, BHP requested a more reliable grid connection. The 2016 storm and heatwaves destroyed power lines, disrupted production and caused financial losses, and the state started initiatives to increase grid reliability. The mine has ordered 210 MW wind power from the 412 MW Goyder South Wind Farm, and 110 MW solar power. In February 2024, construction started for the Blyth battery at 238.5 MW / 477 MWh to balance power for the mine. In October 2024, tornadoes associated with another thunderstorm event destroyed both of the power lines to the mine, shutting down the mine for days.

=== Water supply ===
The Olympic Dam mine uses 35 megalitres of Great Artesian Basin water each day, making it the largest industrial user of underground water in the southern hemisphere. Water is pumped along an underground pipeline from two bore fields which are located 110 km and 200 km to the north of the mine. The salty bore water requires desalination before it is used. Contaminated water from mining operations is passed through a series of sealed ponds where it evaporates. 3 megalitres of the 35 megalitres extracted daily is supplied to the township of Roxby Downs. Water usage has increased significantly since the 1990s. In 1995, the Olympic Dam project, including the Roxby Downs township, consumed an average of 14.3 megalitres of water daily.

The high use of artesian water as a result of mine operations threatens areas of high ecological significance. In particular, the pumping of water from the bore fields has been linked to observations of reductions in flow or drying out in nearby mound springs. As mound springs are the only permanent source of water in the arid interior of South Australia a delicate yet intricate ecological balance has been established with prolonged isolation causing the existence of many rare and endemic species.

=== Air pollution ===
Airborne pollution emissions from the Olympic Dam processing facility are reported annually to the National Pollution Inventory. Emissions exceeding 500 tonnes per annum as of 2013 are (from largest to smallest): particulate matter (10 um), oxides of nitrogen, sulfur dioxide and carbon monoxide.

=== Public sector support ===
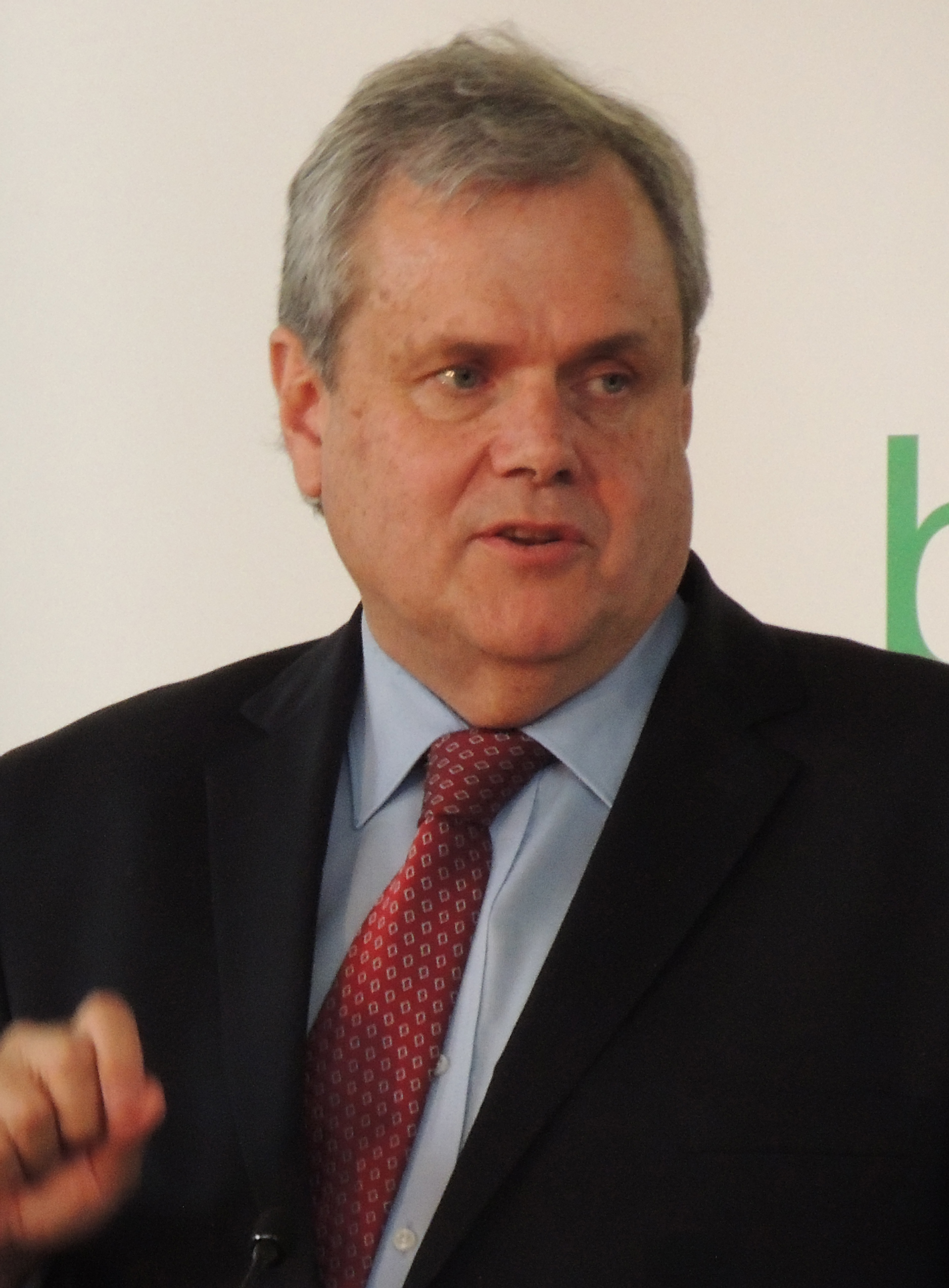
Paul Heithersay, Olympic Dam Task Force CE

In 2006, the Government of South Australia established the Olympic Dam Task Force to assist BHP Billiton with their mine expansion plans. Paul Heithersay is the task force's Chief Executive and as of 2015 also serves as Deputy Chief Executive for the Department of State Development. Current and former senior public servants who have also worked on the Olympic Dam project as employees of BHP Billiton or Western Mining Corporation include Richard Yeeles and Kym Winter-Dewhirst.

== See also ==
- Ian Duncan
- Arvi Parbo
- Hugh Morgan
- List of Australian inquiries into uranium mining
- Uranium mining in Australia
- Uranium ore deposits
