= Rob Thomas (scientist) =

Environmental scientist

Rob Thomas is a prominent senior South Australian environmental scientist. He is currently on contract as Chief Scientific Advisor for the Resources Infrastructure and Investment Task Force of Department of Energy and Mining. Thomas previously held positions of Chief of Aquatic Sciences and Sustainable Systems at the South Australian Research & Development Institute (SARDI), Chief Executive of the Department for Water Resources and Executive Director of the Environment Protection Authority. He became an Associate Professor with the School of Earth and Environmental Sciences at the University of Adelaide in December 2008. Until 2016, Thomas was also a non-executive director of Blue Sky Water Partners. His professional experience has included roles as an environmental consultant, environmental regulator, natural resources manager and research manager.

== Resources Infrastructure & Investment Task Force (RIITF) ==
Thomas was appointed Chief Scientific Advisor for the Olympic Dam Task Force now RIITF in April 2011. This role has seen him advise the Government of South Australia on environmental strategy for complex mining and mineral processing projects including the proposed Olympic Dam mine expansion, the Nyrstar Port Pirie Smelter Transformation, the Whyalla Steelworks, and the Dry Creek Salt Field transformation project.

== Biofuels ==
Rob Thomas has been an active promoter of research and development in biofuels, namely biodiesel and bioethanol.

== Education ==
Thomas holds a master's degree from Brunel University in London and two bachelor's degrees from the University of Adelaide.

== Early career ==
Thomas was the Manager of Marine and Environmental Studies at Kinhill Engineers for ten years prior to his entry into the public service.
