= Resources Infrastructure & Investment Task Force =

South Australian government agency

The Resources Infrastructure & Investment Task Force, formerly the Olympic Dam Task Force, was formed by the Government of South Australia to assist with the facilitation of the expansion of BHP Billiton's Olympic Dam copper, gold and uranium mine near Roxby Downs in the state's Far North region. By 2016, its scope had broadened to include facilitating and supporting several other major resources projects in the state.

== History ==
The Government of South Australia first expressed its intent to form a task force to assist the expansion of the Olympic Dam mine in 2002. This followed an announcement in October that year by then owner of the project, Western Mining Corporation, of its intention to expand the mine. The company was considering the possibility of converting the mine from an underground mine to an open cut operation.

A Cross-Government Taskforce, led by the Department of Trade & Economic Development (now the Department of State Development) was established by Premier Mike Rann that year to progress assessment processes and address related environmental and infrastructure issues. This task force was also involved in supporting matters of local industry participation, workforce planning, native title and Aboriginal heritage, and the review of the existing Roxby Downs (Indenture Ratification) Act 1982. The Cross-Government Tskforce acted as the precursor to the Olympic Dam Task Force.

In 2006, BHP Billiton acquired Western Mining Corporation and its assets and the Olympic Dam Task Force was formed.

=== Establishment ===
The Olympic Dam Task Force was initially allocated $1.5 million over three financial years to support its operations which included maximising the flow-on benefits of the proposed $5 billion plus mining expansion. At the time of its foundation, the Olympic Dam expansion was believed to have the potential to generate around 23 000 direct and indirect jobs. The task force was allocated an additional $1.7 million funding for the financial years 2008-2009 and 2009-2010 to pay for recruitment of additional staff, provision of external advice, and other costs. Annual expenditure exceeded $2 million for the first time in 2012, the same year BHP Billiton publicly announced that it would not to proceed with the expansion as originally planned. South Australian Cabinet documents reveal that the government had been advised by BHP Billiton that the expansion would not proceed as planned several years earlier.

=== Broadening scope (2012-2016) ===
Since BHP Billiton's decision in 2012 to defer the open-cut expansion of the Olympic Dam mine, the Olympic Dam Task Force has expanded its scope to help facilitate additional major projects. These have included the transformation of Nyrstar's poly-metallic smelter at Port Pirie, the expansion of Arrium's iron ore export facilities in Whyalla and the early development of the prospective Braemar region's future export corridor to the Spencer Gulf. The Olympic Dam Task Force is also involved in the facilitation of the Spencer Gulf Ecosystem and Development Initiative, which is led by the University of Adelaide.

This was acknowledged with a name change to the Resources Infrastructure & Investment Task Force in 2016.

== Objectives ==
The Task Force's four initial objectives were to:

1. Drive government facilitation of the project, to ensure timely delivery
2. Facilitate the development of key infrastructure including a major desalination plant
3. Work to try to maximise the regional and state benefits to be derived from the project, particularly in terms of skills development, local content, regional development, infrastructure and indigenous economic development; and
4. Resolve and progress policy, regulatory and legislative issues.

In 2008, its two key roles were:

1. To negotiate indenture arrangements between the State Government and BHP Billiton; and
2. To facilitate the government’s role in the Olympic Dam development

As of 2014, it continued to work to:

1. Facilitate the proposed expansion of the Olympic Dam mine; and
2. Provide BHP Billiton with a single entry point to government.

By 2016, its objectives had broadened to include delivering "innovative and transformative solutions to complex resource and investment projects for the benefit of all South Australians" while "collaborating with stakeholders across government and industry to fund, design, and deliver specialised resource projects" that are:

1. Significant in terms of size and complexity
2. Sensitive (politically, socially and environmentally)
3. Time bound, and for which there is little guidance within the public domain.

== Budget ==
The Olympic Dam Task Force continues to be funded by the Government of South Australia, allocated by the Department of State Development (formerly the Department of Treasury & Finance). Funding is disclosed in annual State Budget papers.

Financial Year	Budget allocation	Actual expenditure	FTE staff
2006-2007	$500,000		0.6
2007-2008	$500,000		
2008-2009	$700,000		
2009-2010	$1,046,000		6
2010-2011	$1,068,000	$1,447,000	7.3
2011-2012	$1,091,000	$2,048,000	8.6
2012-2013	$1,777,000	$2,253,000	7.6
2013-2014	$1,843,000	$2,712,000	7.7
2014-2015	$1,970,000	$2,633,000	6
2015-2016	$7,127,000	$9,714,000	16.4
2016-2017	$6,679,000		13.4

== Membership ==
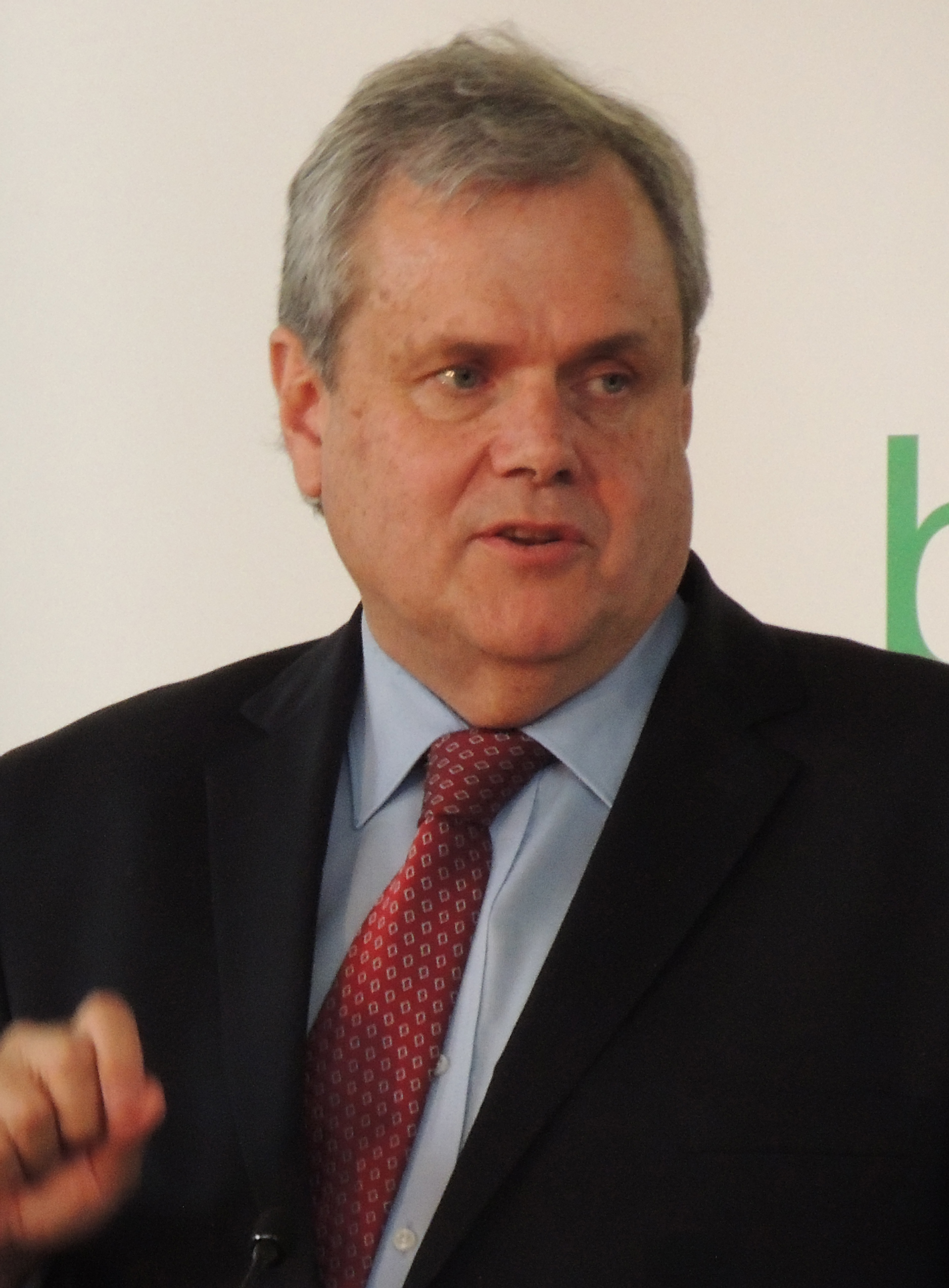
Paul Heithersay (2015)

As of 2014, members of the Olympic Dam Task Force included (but were not limited to):

- Paul Heithersay - Chief Executive
- Rob Thomas - Chief Scientist
- Lachlan Kinnear - Project Manager (appointed in 2008)

=== Former Members ===
Peter Dolan from South Australia's Environment Protection Authority was a member in 2011, though the status of his membership since is unknown. Known former members include Paul Case, whose retirement in 2010 drew media attention to his former position as one of the state's highest paid public servants. As Chief Executive of the Olympic Dam Task Force, Case received $330,000-340,000 annually. Shadow Minister for Trade, Martin Hamilton-Smith called for the Labor government to be less generous when appointing his replacement, drawing attention to Case's salary being greater than that of the Chief Executive of the Department of Trade and Economic Development, Lance Worrall ($302,000 per annum).

== Steering Committee ==
The Olympic Dam Task Force Steering Committee is chaired by prominent South Australian businessman, Bruce Carter. It is composed of senior government and BHP Billiton representatives. Bruce Carter has also worked as a consultant for PIRSA and the Department of Trade & Economic Development providing commercial services related to the Olympic Dam expansion. In October 2011, Carter told a special parliamentary committee that BHP Billiton had lobbied hard to obtain a reduced royalty rate of 3.5 percent, fixed for 45 years with the revision of the Roxby Downs (Indenture Ratification) Act 1982. The standard royalty rate for South Australian mines is 5 percent.
