= Department of the Premier and Cabinet (South Australia) =

Department overview
- Jurisdiction: South Australia
- Headquarters: State Administration Centre, 200 Victoria Square, Adelaide
- Employees: 503
- Annual budget: $425.7 million
- Ministers responsible: Peter Malinauskas, Premier of South Australia; Zoe Bettison, Minister for Multicultural Affairs; Andrea Michaels, Minister for Arts
- Department executive: Rick Persse AM, Chief Executive
- Website: Department for the Premier and Cabinet

The Department of the Premier and Cabinet (DPC) is a department of the Government of South Australia. It is the main agency supporting the Premier and Cabinet by developing policy and delivering their programs, and also carries the arts portfolio.

== Purpose and role ==
As of 2019, DPC's purpose and role included the following:

- Delivering specialist policy advice to the Premier
- Helping Cabinet to function effectively as a decision-making body
- Overseeing Commonwealth-state and international diplomatic relations
- Providing a single agency focus in delivering core functions for:
  - Aboriginal community support and advice, including reconciliation and employment opportunities
  - multicultural affairs
  - leading, developing, funding and coordinating the arts, cultural and creative sector, including the care of the state's collections, buildings and other assets within this sector
- Leading whole-of-government reforms and initiatives based on the Premier's vision for South Australia
- Leading policy reform and delivering effective platforms for a strategic approach to communications, community engagement, cyber security, and digital technology and infrastructure.

=== Arts and culture ===
In 2018, after Steven Marshall's appointment as Premier after the March election, DPC took over most of the responsibilities previously under Arts South Australia, with others going to the Department for Innovation and Skills or Department for Education. (Note: See Arts South Australia article for list of other arts organisations and funding taken over by other departments.)

The statutory authorities taken over directly were:

- Adelaide Festival Corporation
- Adelaide Festival Centre Trust
- Art Gallery of South Australia
- Carrick Hill
- Country Arts SA
- History Trust of South Australia
- South Australian Film Corporation
- South Australian Museum
- State Library of South Australia
- State Opera of South Australia
- State Theatre Company of South Australia
- DPC also provides funding to:
  - Australian Dance Theatre
  - Adelaide Fringe
  - Adelaide Symphony Orchestra
  - Tandanya National Aboriginal Cultural Institute
- DPC manages and funds the following awards:
  - The Ruby Awards
  - Made in Adelaide Awards (for Adelaide Fringe artists)

The biennial Adelaide Festival Awards for Literature are managed by the State Library of South Australia (which is under the DPC).

In September 2019, the "Arts and Culture Plan, South Australia 2019–2024" was created by the department. However the plan did not signal any new government support, even after the government's A$31.9 million cuts to arts funding when Arts South Australia was absorbed into DPC in 2018. Specific proposals within the plan included an "Adelaide in 100 Objects" walking tour, a new shared ticketing system for small to medium arts bodies, a five-year-plan to revitalise regional art centres, creation of an arts-focussed high school, and a new venue for the Adelaide Symphony Orchestra. In 2019–20, spending on arts and culture was reduced by 6%, and then by another 3% in 2020–21, leading to a lobbying campaign by the arts sector.

In September 2023, arts minister in the Malinauskas government, Andrea Michaels, announced that multi-year funded arts organisations would be given a one-off bonus payment, to help compensate for rising costs as well as the impact of the COVID-19 pandemic in South Australia. From 1 October, the arts would be once again brought together under a "united arts portfolio", overseen by Michaels and DPC deputy chief executive Alison Lloydd-Wright. The directors of Arts South Australia and creative industries, Jennifer Layther and Becc Bates respectively, will report to Lloydd-Wright. A new cultural policy would be developed in collaboration with the arts, cultural and creative sector, which would align with the National Cultural Policy Revive, and would be released by mid-2024.

== Publications and online resources ==
The department's activities are summarised in its Annual Reports. Other publications include range of policies, guidelines, reports and other documentation.

=== Lobbyist register ===
The department maintains a register of all third-party political lobbyists who are currently lobbying in South Australia. The register includes the trading names of lobbying entities, names of persons engaged in lobbying and current lists of the clients they commercially represent.

== Recent CEOs ==
- Damien Walker: April 2022 - December 2024
- Kym Winter-Dewhirst: January 2015 – January 2017
- Don Russell: February 2017 – March 2018
- Jim McDowell: September 2018 – 2020
- Nick Reade: February 2021 – April 2022
- Damien Walker: April 2022 – present

== See also ==
- Cabinet of South Australia
