= Ian Duncan (businessman) =

Australian businessman

Dr Ian Duncan is a businessman active in the Australian resources sector. He is a past president of operations at the Olympic Dam mine in South Australia under Western Mining Corporation. He was Chairman of the London-based Uranium Institute (now the World Nuclear Association) in 1995-1996. From the 1990s to the present, Duncan has advocated for nuclear industrial development in Australia, specifically the development of facilities to store and dispose of nuclear waste and the legalization and development of nuclear power plants for the generation of electricity. He is a Fellow of the Australian Academy of Technology, Science and Engineering (ATSE), the Australasian Institute of Mining and Metallurgy (AusIMM), and Engineers Australia.

== Career ==
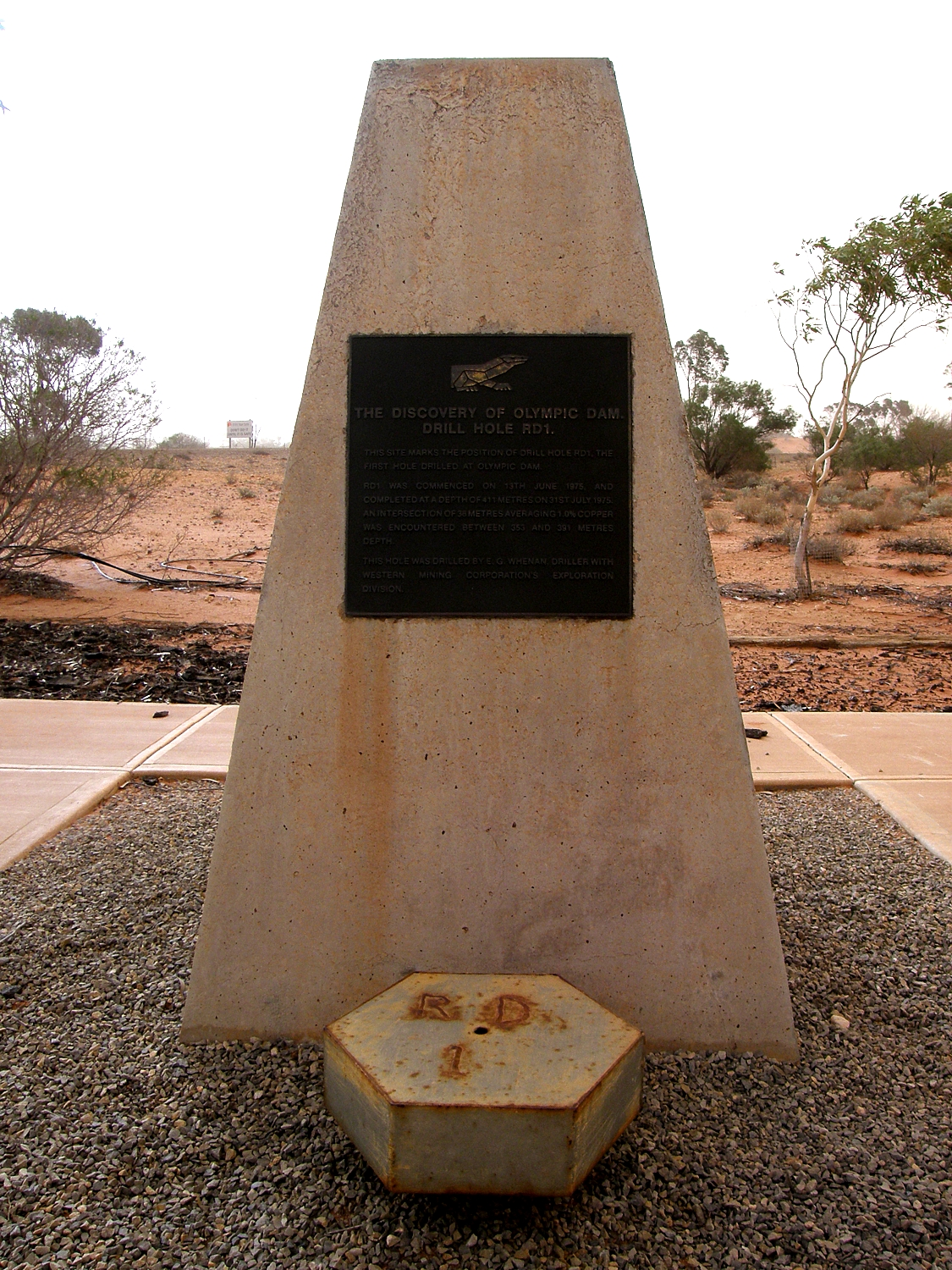
Monument marking the first hole drilled into the Olympic Dam IOCGU deposit (commenced 13 June 1975).

Duncan joined Western Mining Corporation (WMC Resources) in 1971 and remained with the company for 27 years. He commenced as operations manager of the company's exploration division, and rose to General Manager of the Olympic Dam mine.

== Nuclear power ==
During the 2000s and 2010s, Duncan advocated for the development of nuclear power in Australia.

In 2005, Duncan described the status of breeder reactors as seeing "little advancement". He told the ABC that "There is abundant uranium to meet all future requirements for light water reactors that are planned around the world." That year he also became a non-executive director of Perth-based company, Energy Ventures Ltd. As of 2017, the company owns various uranium and energy exploration and development projects in Australia and internationally. The most advanced of these is the Aurora Uranium project in Oregon, USA.

In 2006, Duncan described opponents of nuclear power as often using the subject of nuclear waste as a "tool". He argued that "due to global progress and example, the disposal of nuclear waste need not be a showstopper for nuclear power in Australia."

In 2009, Duncan told The Age that he thought it was "time to seriously think about nuclear power as part of the baseload electricity generation. It's time that we moved along from the caveman attitude of just picking up and burning things. We should move to a higher order of source of energy." He also referred to nuclear power as clean electricity with virtually no greenhouse gas emissions. He estimated that Australia's first nuclear power station could cost $6–8 billion and take ten years to design, build and commission.

In April 2010, Duncan spoke at an event in Western Australia hosted by CEDA entitled "Assessing the Prospects of Nuclear Power in Australia". Michael Angwin of the Australian Uranium Association and Daniela Stehlik of the National Academies Forum also spoke at the event.

In September 2010, Duncan told an Australian Institute of Energy Syposium held by the Perth Branch that he predicted that Australia's first nuclear reactors would be light-water reactors with a 600–1200 MWe capacity each, built in pairs, with sea water cooled condensers. They would be fueled with enriched uranium and spent nuclear fuel would ultimately be disposed of into ancient and stable underground rock storage facilities.

=== After Fukushima ===
Following the 2011 Fukushima nuclear disaster, Duncan remained optimistic about the prospect of nuclear power in Australia.

In 2013, he wrote that "if the economics for electricity generation is impacted by a carbon tax or a compulsory carbon capture and sequestration, then nuclear generation will be economically competitive."

At a conference entitled "Nuclear Power for Australia?" held by ATSE in July of that year, he argued that if Australia were to aspire to produce electricity with nuclear power plants, a new Commonwealth agency 'inspectorate' with regulatory control over the choice of technology, siting, construction and operation should be established by 2016. He proposed the working title Nuclear Installations Regulator for Australia (NIRA) and presented a detailed timeline of potential milestones to achieve between 2013 and criticality for the first reactor in 2030. His presentation flagged "Restart nuclear debate" as a first step, during the period 2014-2017.

In 2015, a Nuclear Fuel Cycle Royal Commission commenced in South Australia tasked with investigating the opportunities and risks associated with South Australia's future role in the nuclear fuel cycle. Duncan's submission to the Royal Commission identified areas of the state's coastline he believed were potentially suitable for the siting of nuclear power plants.

== Nuclear waste ==
Duncan was a Member of the SYNROC Steering Committee (whose work was based on research and development undertaken by ANSTO and the ANU).

In 2002, after his retirement, Duncan completed a doctorate at Oxford University considering the "interface between society and the disposal of radioactive waste". His publication was entitled "Radioactive Waste: Risk, Reward, Space and Time Dynamics" and he followed it with opinion pieces and media commentary on the subject during the early 2000s. In 2003 he anticipated that "by far the biggest advancement will come from a better understanding of the public psyche by industry and not by a better understanding of the industry by the public."

In 2003, he made the claim that "the Premier that supports the siting of a national repository will probably be remembered as the statesman who cleaned up Australia!"

In the mid-2000s Duncan was actively consulting in the area, and was consulted during the Uranium Mining, Processing and Nuclear Energy Review (UMPNER) in 2006.

In 2006, Duncan maintained the view that Australia had an obligation to appropriately manage its own, domestically produced nuclear waste. In an article published in Focus, the magazine of ATSE, he wrote:

"There is no justification for the importation of other countries’ radioactive waste, nor for participation in any so called ‘international attempts’ at nuclear waste disposal. Our moral obligation is to properly dispose of our own waste and that is achievable."

In 2015 Duncan was appointed to the Independent Advisory Panel of the National Radioactive Waste Management Project for the Australian Government.

In September 2016, Duncan gave a presentation on the work of the Royal Commission and the National Radioactive Waste Management Project to members of the Minerals, Processing and Extractive Metallurgy Division of the Institute of Materials, Minerals and Mining. During his talk he mentioned that 40 years had transpired since the Flower's Report was published in the UK, which prompted environmental consideration of the fate of nuclear wastes and their future management.
