= Legend in Mining award =

Australian mining industry award

The Legend in Mining award is presented annually to individuals who have made notable contributions to the resources sector in Australia.

The award recipients are determined by the editors of Resource Stocks magazine, a London-based industry publication.

== Recipients ==
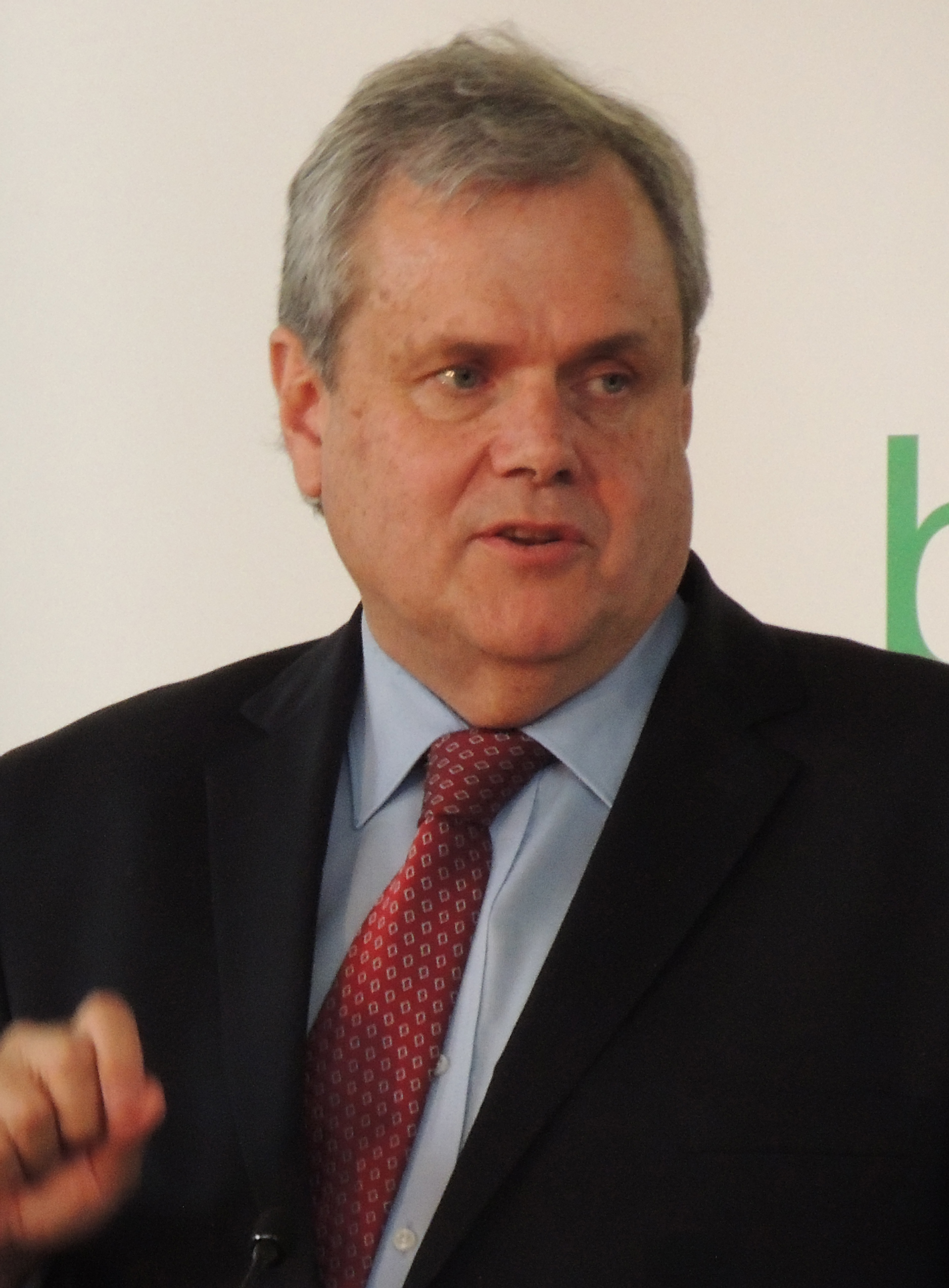
Paul Heithersay (2015)

Past recipients of the award include:

- Nev Power, CEO of Fortescue (2017)
- Mark Bennett, Sirius (2014)
- Paul Heithersay, Government of South Australia (2013)
- David Moore, Mincor Resources (2012)
- Paul Holloway, Government of South Australia (2008)
- Ian Burston (2008)
- Gavin Thomas (2005)
- Robert Champion de Crespigny
- Ian Plimer
- John Collier
- Ron Manners
- Trevor Sykes
- Roy Woodall
- Owen Hegarty
- Andrew Forrest, Fortescue
