= Northern Water Project =

Infrastructure project in South Australia

The Northern Water Project is an AUD $5 billion water supply infrastructure project located in South Australia. It incorporates an industrial-scale seawater desalination plant to extract water from Spencer Gulf and associated pipelines and pump stations. It is intended to supply water to remote mining projects, including the Olympic Dam mine and other future commercial users. The plant is proposed to be constructed at Mullaquana Station, which is located 20 kilometres south of the town of Whyalla.

== History ==
In the mid-2000s, mining company BHP Billiton proposed to develop a seawater desalination for their exclusive use in the Upper Spencer Gulf, at Point Lowly. The plant was intended to supply water for industrial use to the Olympic Dam mine. While presented as a major economic activity, the project also attracted strong criticism from local community members, recreational and commercial fishing and seafood sectors and environmental groups, due to the potential for discharged brine to adversely impact the marine ecology of Spencer Gulf. Concerned parties included local residents, environmentalists, prawn fishers, and fish farmers. A key concern raised was the potential for desalination brine to impact the giant Australian cuttlefish breeding aggregation that occurs between Point Lowly and Whyalla. In 2009, an Environment Resources and Development Committee formed by the South Australian parliament was warned of the potential for the brine discharge to harm Spencer Gulf's marine ecology, and recommended that the company investigate sites outside of Spencer Gulf. The company made limited investigations of non-Spencer Gulf sites in their Supplementary Environmental Impact Statement before ruling them out and proceeding with their original plan. The project received all necessary development approvals to proceed at Point Lowly in 2011, but the company decided not to construct the project for financial reasons.

The Northern Water Project attempts to address the same water security problem that the Olympic Dam mine faced in the 2000s. The mine currently meets its water requirements exclusively by extracting water from two borefields in the Great Artesian Basin. Concerns about the future viability of those water sources exist, as ongoing pressure drops would result in loss of cultural heritage and ecological communities including those in the Wabma Kadarbu mound spring complex.

In mid 2025, project partners Fortescue and Origin Energy withdrew from the project. Minister Koutantonis claimed that their withdrawal would have minimal impact on the project's feasibility.

== Overview ==
Led by the Government of South Australia, the Northern Water Project will produce 51 gigalitres of water for industrial use annually (140 megalitres per day). Water would be extracted from Spencer Gulf and desalinated at a coastal desalination plant, with waste with elevated salinity and mineral content returned to Spencer Gulf. The desalinated water would be pumped through 400 kilometres of associated pipelines to users in the far north of South Australia, supporting the existing Olympic Dam mine and enabling future projects in the region.

An alternative site at Cape Hardy was recommended by Infrastructure SA, but was passed over in the final decision-making. The Cape Hardy site could co-locate the plant with a future iron ore export port, proposed to be developed by an emerging mining company, Iron Road.

== Status ==
As of July 2026, the project is working with Barngarla and Kokatha traditional owners to understand cultural heritage of impacted lands and waters while negotiating Land Use Agreements and engaging in wider community consultation. An Environmental Impact Statement is in preparation, including hydrodynamic modelling studies of Upper Spencer Gulf circulation and other marine environmental studies. Two consortiums have been shortlisted to deliver the project, and commercial arrangements for project delivery and water purchase agreements are under development.

The consortia are WaterConnector (comprising Acciona Construction Australia Pty Ltd and Acciona Agua Australia Pty Ltd) and Watermark consortia (comprising Clough Project Australia Pty Ltd (Webuild Group), Fisia Italimpianti SpA (Webuild Group), CPB Contractors Pty Ltd and Sacyr Water Pty Ltd.).

The project will require development approval from South Australian and Commonwealth governments under development and environmental legislation.

A Northern Water Project EIS survey is accepting submissions until 9 August 2026 from any interested parties.
