= Kym Winter-Dewhirst =

South Australian public servant

Kym Winter-Dewhirst was a senior South Australian public servant, former mining industry professional and political lobbyist. He was appointed to the role of Chief Executive Department of the Premier & Cabinet in the Government of South Australia in January 2015, where he became the highest paid public sector employee in South Australia's history. He was previously employed as Vice-President of Coal at BHP Billiton, and had worked extensively on the Olympic Dam mine expansion project as an employee of Western Mining Corporation prior to 2005 and BHP Billiton thereafter.

== Early career ==
Winter-Dewhirst studied politics at Flinders University and journalism at the University of South Australia. Also a musician and songwriter, his band, Kym Winter-Dewhirst and the Love Muscles, released an album called Dirty World in 1994. He established the firm Winter-Dewhirst & Associates in 1996 and worked as a political lobbyist until 2002. Between 2002 and 2004, he was the Chief of Staff to the Government of South Australia's Environment Minister, John Hill.

== Career ==
=== Olympic Dam mine ===
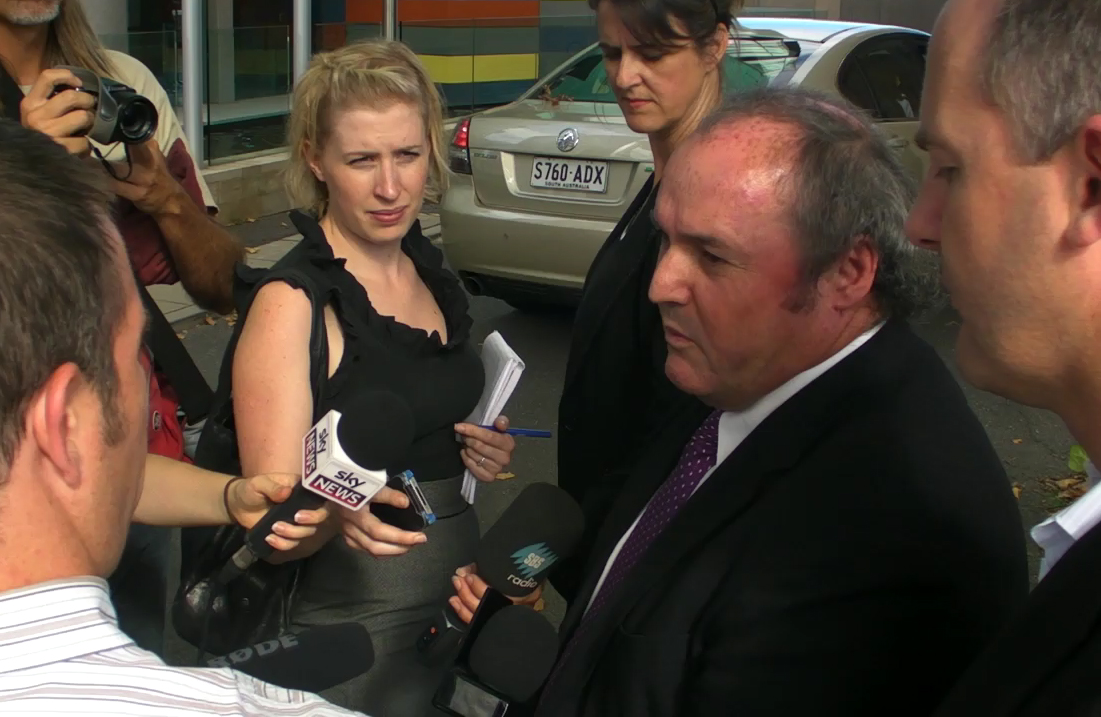
Kym Winter-Dewhirst speaks for BHP Billiton following the Olympic Dam approval court challenge 2012

Kym Winter-Dewhirst has had a long professional association with the Olympic Dam copper, gold and uranium mine near Roxby Downs in South Australia. Prior to BHP Billiton's acquisition of Western Mining Corporation and its assets in 2005 (which included the Olympic Dam mine), Winter-Dewhirst worked for WMC as manager of government relations. Under BHP Billiton's ownership, his senior executive positions related to the mine have included Vice-President External Affairs – Uranium Customer Sector Group and Vice-President Government and Community Relations Olympic Dam. He has worked as part of the company's environmental regulatory approvals team with a focus on the Olympic Dam environmental impact study (EIS) and the revision of the Roxby Downs (Indenture Ratification) Act 1982.

In 2012, following the dismissal of Arabunna elder Kevin Buzzacott's legal challenge of the Olympic Dam mine expansion's environmental approval, Winter-Dewhirst told the ABC that the company had always been confident and welcomed the result. Despite economic circumstances placing the expansion project on hold, Winter-Dewhirst believes it is not a matter of "if" but "when" it will proceed.

In his role as Vice-President External Affairs he briefed the Minister of BHP Billiton's intention to undertake heap leaching mineral processing trials at Olympic Dam. Federal environmental approval was granted for trials to proceed on 29 August 2014. On 5 September it was announced that Kym Winter-Dewhirst would be appointed to Chief executive of the Department of Premier and Cabinet and that he would assume the role in early 2015.

=== Department of the Premier and Cabinet, Chief executive ===
In January 2015 Winter-Dewhirst was responsible for the sacking of 11 executives within the Department of Premier and Cabinet. Critics felt the process was unnecessarily brutal, with at least one marched from the building "like a criminal about to confront the gallows". Winter-Dewhirst told staff that a new Executive Committee (ExCo) would meet in February "with a focus on business planning, delivery measurement and reporting, as well as embedding our values." The message was delivered via email. Premier Jay Weatherill referred to Winter-Dewhirst's restructuring as helping to create an "engine room of policy" stating that "it was his decision, not my decision, but I fully support it."

Winter-Dewhirst's annual salary of $550,000 has attracted criticism by political commentators. His predecessor Jim Hallion received $425,000.

In 2016 Winter-Dewhirst told in Daily "I always felt that in this job time is my enemy… And so I decided I would make some significant changes and I would start at the top, and I would create opportunities for others to step up and seize a new agenda." He also stated that he views the department as a "business", the focus of which is now "delivery and implementation".

He stepped down in early 2017 to care for his ill wife, with Don Russell taking his place.

=== Other appointments ===
Prior to his appointment as BHP Billiton's Vice-President Coal, Winter-Dewhirst held a number of senior positions within the company, including Vice-President Group Public Affairs and Principal Adviser Government and Community Relations – Base Metals Australia. Winter-Dewhirst was also the Minerals Council of Australia's appointed representative on the Lake Eyre Basin Agreement's Community Advisory Committee. He has also held a position on the board of the Adelaide Botanic Gardens.

== Personal life ==
Kym Winter-Dewhirst was born in Adelaide. He was married in the Adelaide Botanic Gardens in 1983. He lived in Brisbane while acting as BHP Billiton's Vice-President of Coal.

In early 2017 he stepped down from his role as CEO of DPC, in order to care for his ill wife.
