= Bruce Carter (businessman) =

Australian businessman

Bruce James Carter AO (born 1958) is an Australian businessman and former member of the Executive Committee of Cabinet for the Government of South Australia. He is Fellow of the Institute of Chartered Accountants, a founding partner of the South Australian office of Ferrier Hodgson, and is considered to be one of the state's most influential people.

== Career ==
Carter obtained a degree in economics and a Master of Business Administration.

He is a former partner at Ernst & Young and has worked in corporate restructuring and insolvency for over 30 years. Carter has assisted many companies including Elders, Harris Scarfe and Balfours and has provided professional advice to the Government of South Australia. He also provided services to the Australian Government during its GST review. He was one of three members of its review panel, the others being politicians Nick Greiner and John Brumby.

He joined Workcover as Chair in 2003, and five years later told a Parliamentary inquiry into the organisation that within the "first month of being there I realised this was an organisation out of control and that there was a lack of virtually anything you would expect to find in a statutory organisation." By 2011, Carter had developed a reputation as the State Government's "Mr Fix-it".

Carter has served as a member of the Executive Committee of Cabinet for the Government of South Australia.

Carter was appointed Chair of the Economic Development Board of South Australia in 2008.

In 2008-2009, Carter was Chair of the Economic Development Board and the SA Motor Sport Board. Senator Nick Xenophon drew attention to potential conflicts of interest emerging from Carter's mix of public and private sector interests in October 2010, following his appointment to SkyCity Entertainment Group's board. Carter resigned from his position at the Economic Development Board in November 2010. Carter retired from SkyCity's Deputy Chair position in March 2021.

He was appointed chair of shipbuilder ASC Pty Ltd in 2010 and as of December 2026 retired from the position after 16 years.

Carter was appointed Chairman of the Premier's Climate Change Council and Chairman of the board of RenewablesSA in 2011, retiring in 2018

In 2013, Carter was listed as a potential alternative trustee during a legal dispute over the management of a trust fund established by mining magnate Lang Hancock and managed by his daughter Gina Rinehart. Carter withdrew his nomination after the sudden death of his wife.

Carter is a former Deputy Chair of Wilderness School and St Peter's College. He was the National President of the Heart Foundation for 4 years and was on the National board from 2000 to 2011 and the South Australian board from 1992 to 2011.

At 2020, Carter was Chair of the Olympic Dam Task Force Steering Committee, which became the Resource and Infrastructure Task Force dealing with Olympic Dam (to 2014) Nyrstar in Port Pirie and GFG re the Whyalla Steelworks.

He was chairman of Genesee & Wyoming Australia. He was the Chair of Territory Insurance Office until 2015., He is a former director of the Bank of Queensland and a director of several unlisted companies, including the construction company, Badge, The Cohen Group of Companies, AIG Australia and a former chair of Sage Automation

Carter was on the board of Connecticut based Genesee & Wyoming Inc from 2018 until it was taken over by Brookfield Infrastructure Partners in 2020. Following the takeover Genesee & Wyoming Australia was sold to Macquarie Infrastructure and Carter was appointed chairman of One Rail Australia. In July 2022 Aurizon purchased ORA and Carter retired from the board.

Carter was appointed to the board of Crown Resorts initially in April 2021 until regulatory approval confirming his appointment in August 2021. In June 2022 Blackstone purchased Crown and Carter retired from the board.

Carter was chair of Aventus since listing in 2015, a large format retail centre REIT, 30% owned by Brett Blundy. In May 2022 Aventus was taken over by HomeCo Capital at $2.2B and the assets merged into the HomeCo Daily Needs REIT of which Carter became a director for transition.

In November 2022, Carter became a director of Lovisa Holdings, an ASX 200 global jewellery retailer 40% owned by Brett Blundy.

Carter became a Trustee of the Adelaide Festival Theatre Trust, appointed by the State government, in January 2022. He was formerly a trustee in the 1990s.

Carter was appointed an Officer of the Order of Australia in the 2024 Australia Day Honours for "distinguished service to business, to charitable organisations, and to the community".

== Personal life ==
Carter is an old scholar of Pembroke School, Adelaide and graduated in 1975. He has 4 adult children Carter's wife died in 2013. Carter remarried in November 2022.
