= Terry Burgess (businessman) =

Terry Burgess is a resources sector businessman and industry representative based in South Australia, best known for his roles as former CEO of the Australian Securities Exchange-listed copper mining company Oz Minerals (2009-2014) and former president of the South Australian Chamber of Mines & Energy (SACOME).

== Industry advocacy ==
In 2015, the year after Burgess left the company, Oz Minerals received the Excellence in Leadership, Women in Resources and Excellence in Supporting Communities awards, presented by SACOME. At the time he urged the industry to be "proactive and set the agenda for debates rather than have others impose their own agendas onto the sector."

In 2017 he advocated for utility-scale battery storage to support continuity of electricity supply for mining projects. As of 2020 he sits on the Tonsley Innovation District Steering Committee and is Co-Chair of the Hydrogen Economy Steering Committee for the Government of South Australia.
