= Herbert Geer =

Herbert Geer was an Australian commercial law firm with offices located in Melbourne, Sydney and Brisbane.

== History ==
The law firm of Herbert Geer was founded on 26 January 1939 when Keith Geer commenced his sole practice in Bank Place, off Collins Street, Melbourne. After the disruption of the Second World War, Keith Geer resumed his practice and was joined in 1946 by Geoffrey Herbert, who continued to operate from his office in Black Rock.

The firm was known as Herbert & Geer and was largely a conveyancing practice. In 1950 the partnership expanded further with the addition of Eric Rundle and in 1960 it assumed the name, Herbert Geer & Rundle. In 1962 the Melbourne office relocated to 113 William Street, taking with it a total of ten partners and staff and three residents in the office at Black Rock. At about this time the firm purchased an office in Niddrie at the request of the Bank of New South Wales, for professional expansion in this area. This office was sold in 1988. Between 1962 and 1970, three small practices were absorbed into Herbert Geer & Rundle; Farmer & Ramsay, Williams & Matthews and the office of Cyril Brooks.

The firm achieved publicity in the early 1970s by handling the defendant's litigation for all workers' compensation claims arising from the Westgate bridge collapse.

Further office relocations occurred with moves to Owen Dixon Chambers and BHP House before arriving at the State Bank Building in 1983. At that time the firm comprised 35 persons and was well known for its strong commercial practice focusing on tax. The prominent partners were then Leon Gorr, David Geer and Tom May.

In July 1985, the firm took the pivotal step of acquiring an insurance litigation practice of 11 persons led by Richard Mole. By 1989 Herbert Geer & Rundle had one of the largest insurance practices in Victoria. The firm had 12 partners and 110 staff.

In April 1999, Richard Mole opened a Sydney office for the firm and expanded to Brisbane in early 2001.

In 2008, the firm rebranded from Herbert Geer & Rundle as Herbert Geer and sought mergers.

The firm joined with Brisbane firm Nicol Robinson Halletts Lawyers, as well as the boutique construction firm RDK in Sydney.

From November 2008, Herbert Geer successfully acted for iiNet, an Internet Service Provider (ISP) in its defence of a landmark Federal Court claim and subsequent appeals to the Full Federal Court and Hight Court. The litigation was commenced by a group of major film and television studios alleging that iiNet had authorised copyright infringements by its subscribers.

The case known on Twitter as #iitrial was also the first in Australia to be live-tweeted from trial to the High Court. The high profile nature of the case was evident when the news of the High Court's judgment in favour of iiNet trended in Australia and world-wide.

In 2014, Herbert Geer merged with Thomsons Lawyers to form Thomson Geer.
