= Paul Heithersay =

Paul Heithersay PSM FTSE
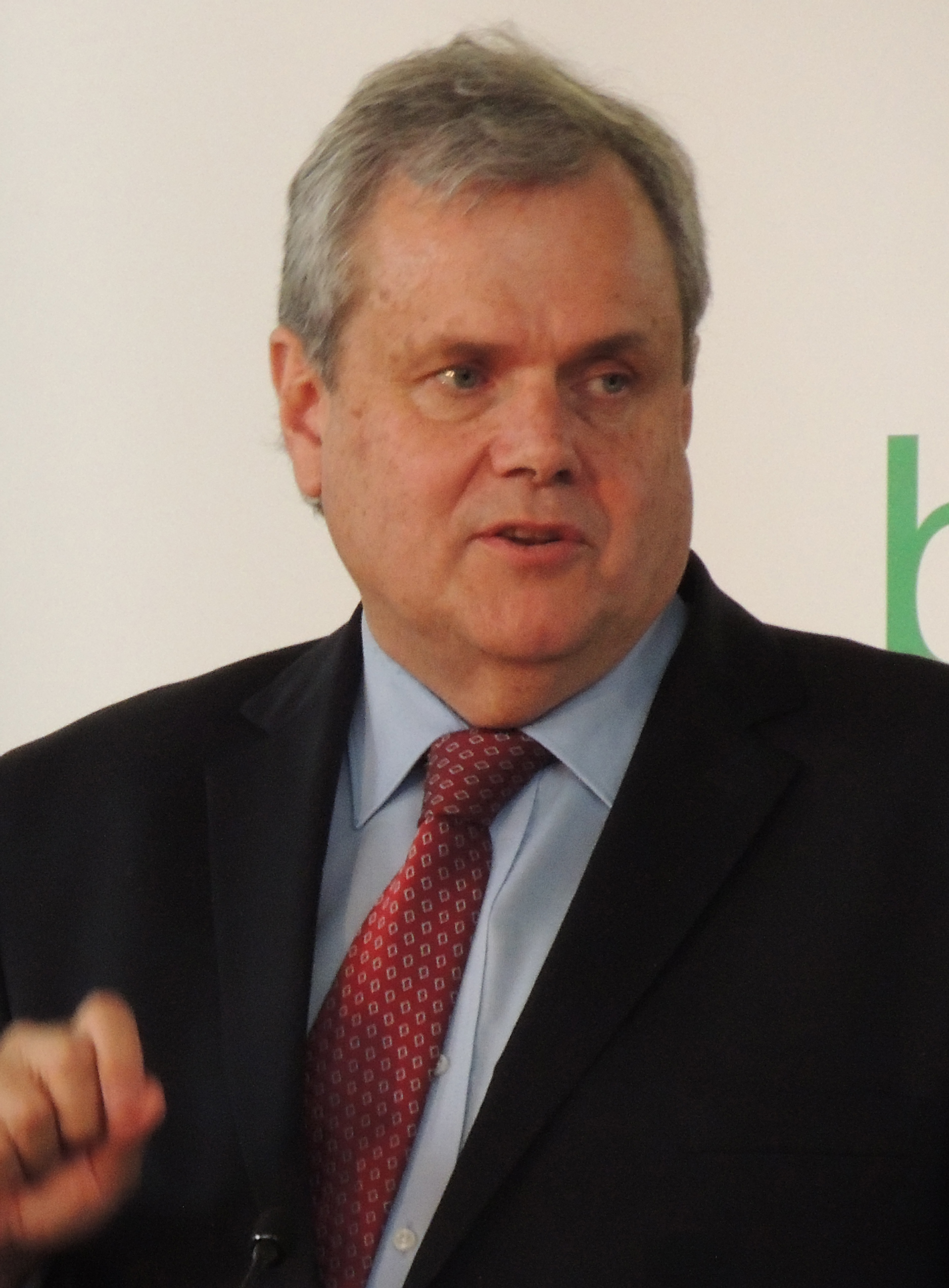
- Occupation: Public servant
- Employer: Government of South Australia
- Title: Chief executive of the Department for Energy and Mining
- Awards: Public Service Medal (2012)

Paul Sinclair Heithersay is a public servant employed by the Government of South Australia. He is the chief executive of the Department for Energy and Mining. He was appointed to this role by the then recently elected Liberal government in June 2018.

Prior to that he had been deputy chief executive of the Department of State Development (previously known as DMITRE) since July 2014. He was the chief executive of the Resources Infrastructure & Investment Task Force, to which he was appointed in December 2010. He is responsible for overseeing and coordinating the State Government's interaction with BHP, which owns the Olympic Dam copper, gold and uranium mine. Heithersay joined the public service in 2002 after 20 years of working for the mining companies North Limited and Geopeko. His first role for the government was as executive director of the Geological Survey of South Australia within Department of Primary Industries and Regions South Australia (PIRSA).

== Honours ==
Heithersay received a Public Service Medal for his work in the South Australian mineral resource sector in the 2012 Queen's Birthday Honours. He was elected a fellow of the Australian Academy of Technological Sciences (ATSE) in November that year.

In October 2013 Heithersay received the annual ResourceStocks magazine Legend in Mining award for his role in increasing investment in South Australian energy and mineral resources. This award acknowledged his role in the development of the PACE 2020 program (Program for Accelerated Exploration) and the establishment of DMITRE as a single access point for investors in the resources sector.

In 2014 the Society of Economic Geologists appointed Heithersay as its international exchange lecturer.

== Board memberships ==
- Institute for Mineral & Energy Resources (IMER) Advisory Board – University of Adelaide
- Resources Industry Development Board (RIDB) – Department of State Development, South Australia
- Resources & Energy Skills Alliance (RESA) Board
