= Institute for Mineral & Energy Resources =

Institute for Mineral and Energy Resources
- Abbreviation: IMER
- Successor: Institute for Sustainability, Energy and Resources
- Formation: 19 December 2008
- Type: Research institute
- Location: Adelaide, South Australia, Australia
- Parent organisation: University of Adelaide

The Institute for Mineral & Energy Resources (IMER) is the point of contact at the University of Adelaide for strategic research interests related to mineral and energy resources. It was founded in 2009 and launched h Australian Minister for Mineral Resource Development, Paul Holloway on 5 October 2010. The institute attracted over $18.5 million in research funding and corporate sponsorship in its first year. The IMER facilitates collaborative research between the higher education sector and industry and can take the shape of project collaboration to meet a company's specific needs, consultancy utilising academic researchers and PhD students, organisational collaboration to leverage government funding and long-term partnerships offering mutual benefits.

== Major projects ==
In 2012, the institute was awarded over 1.5million as part of the Australian Research Council's Industrial Transformation Program. Funds will be spent over six years during the establishment of a research hub for advancing copper-uranium production. BHP Billiton partnered with IMER on the project and is providing $2.5 million in cash plus additional in-kind contributions.

== Cooperative Research Centres ==
The University of Adelaide also houses three Cooperative Research Centres (CRCs) which interact with IMER, its staff and its research projects. The CRC for Greenhouse Gas Technologies focuses on carbon capture and storage technology and the Energy Pipelines CRC focuses technology and processes for the maintenance and extension of existing natural gas pipelines and future pipeline needs. The Deep Exploration Technologies CRC focuses on developing cheaper, safer and more effective methods for drilling, analysis and targeting of deep mineral deposits. The latter CRC has been funded in excess of AUD$145 million through a combination of Federal government grants and corporate sponsorship, making it the "world’s best-supported independent research initiative in mineral exploration."

== Objectives ==
As of 2014 the objectives of IMER are to:

- Advance science and technology to enhance prospecting, discovery and extraction of mineral and energy resources, including petroleum and geothermal resources
- Advance science and technology to lower costs and enhance cleaner energy generation, storage, transmission and utilisation of energy
- Increase energy efficiency and reduce the impact of industrial processes, especially in mining and mineral processing
- Maximise social and economic benefits of mineral and energy resource developments
- Advance the prevention, assessment and remediation of environmental impacts of mineral and energy resource developments

== Advisory board ==
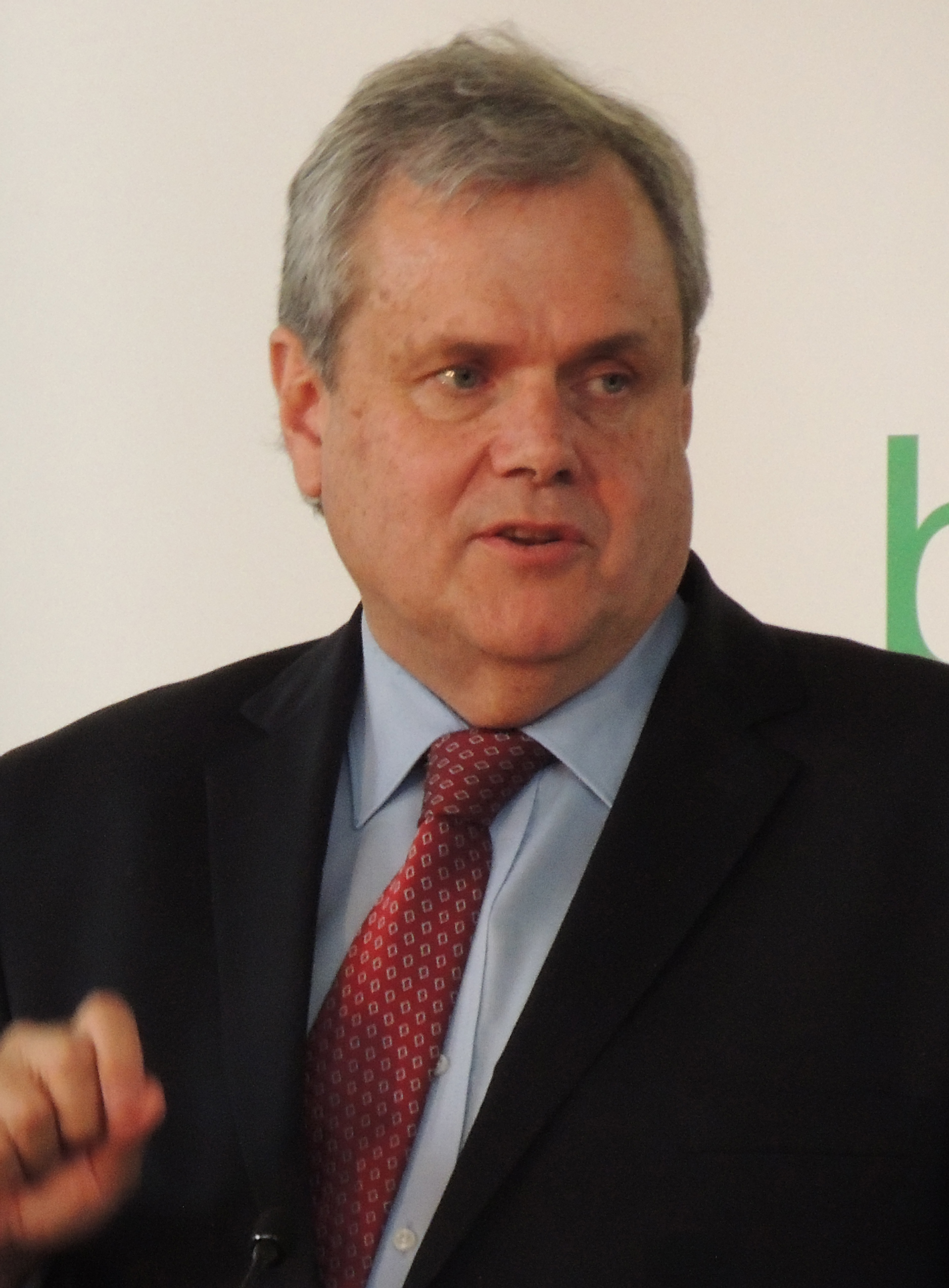
Paul Heithersay (2015)

The IMER Advisory Board contains members from the university, State government and private sectors. As of December 2021, board members are:

- John Anderson, Austrike Resources
- Joe Cucuzza, industryC21
- Andrew Freeman, Santos
- Paul Heithersay, Department for Energy & Mining, Adelaide
- Katie Hulmes, Oz Minerals
- Damien Leclercq, University of Adelaide
- Peter Williams, Curtin University

== Sponsors ==
Notable companies and organisations which have financially supported IMER research projects include (but are not limited to):

- Barrick Gold
- Beach Energy
- Chevron
- CSIRO
- Defence Science & Technology Group
- Esso Australia
- ExxonMobil Australia
- Halliburton
- Iluka Resources
- Imperial Oil
- Iron Road
- Newmont
- Oz Minerals
- Rio Tinto
- Santos
- Shell Development Australia
- Woodside Energy
- Xstrata Coal
