= Mills Oakley =

- Headquarters: Melbourne, Australia
- No. of attorneys: 600+ lawyers
- No. of employees: 1100+ employees
- Major practice areas: Real Estate, M&A, Corporate, and Finance, Private Advisory, Insurance, Not-for-profit, Technology and Intellectual Property, Construction
- Key people: John Nerurker, CEO
- Date founded: 1864
- Company type: Partnership
- Website: http://www.millsoakley.com.au

Mills Oakley is an Australian commercial law firm with offices in Melbourne, Sydney, Brisbane, Canberra, Perth, Adelaide and Darwin.

The firm is currently ranked as a Top 10 Australian legal partnership by size, currently ranked 5th by partner count, and was named Law Firm of the Year at the Australasian Law Awards in 2017. The firm also won the ALPMA Thought Leadership Award in 2017, and has been noted for its growing representation in leading legal directories.

== About Mills Oakley ==
Mills Oakley is resourced by 170 partners, and employs more than 300 lawyers.

Its clients include ASX top 200 listed companies, mid-sized corporates, the public sector and not-for-profit organisations. The firm has experienced 13 consecutive years of double digit revenue and profit growth since 2004.

== Mills Oakley Accelerator ==
In 2016, Mills Oakley launched the first Australian legal services accelerator.

== Everyday Justice ==
In 2021, Mills Oakley announced the launch of Everyday Justice, a pro bono firm with practices in public welfare, human rights, reconciliation, and the environment.

Everyday Justice operates from every Mills Oakley office.
