= Senex Energy =

Australian energy company

- Type: Public
- Industry: Energy
- Founded: 15 August 1984
- Headquarters: Level 30, 180 Ann Street, Brisbane, Queensland, Australia,
- Key people: Mr Ian Davies, CEO
- Products: gas and petroleum exploration;
- Number of employees: ~200 (2023)
- Website: www.senexenergy.com.au

Senex Energy Pty Ltd (Senex) is an Australian energy company that was listed on the Australian Securities Exchange (ASX) in 1984 until 2022. The business is now privately owned by POSCO International and Hancock Prospecting. The name refers to the Latin word Senex.

== Operations ==
Senex's operations are based in the Surat Basin with producing assets near the townships of Roma and Wandoan in Queensland.

Senex formerly owned producing oil assets in Australia's Cooper Basin.

== History ==
Senex was listed on the ASX in August 1984 as Victoria Petroleum N.L. At that time, the company was based in Perth and headed by Founding Managing Director John Kopcheff, who retired from the Board in September 2010.

In June 2010, the company announced the appointment of Ian Davies as Managing Director and advised that the business would relocate its head office to Brisbane. Later in the year, the business announced "aggressive development programs" for its oil and gas acreage in the Cooper and Surat Basins, further leadership appointments and obtained shareholder approval to amend the company's status and constitution.

On 14 February 2011, the company officially changed its name to Senex Energy Limited and adopted the ASX ticker code "SXY". One week later, the company announced a merger with fellow Cooper Basin oil producer Stuart Petroleum.

Senex was admitted to the ASX/S&P 200 index in April 2012. In March 2013, the ASX amended the company's classification to a Mining Producing Entity, for reporting purposes.

Senex operated more than 10 oil fields in the South Australian Cooper Basin, including Growler oil field, which was connected via pipeline to the Moomba oil processing facility in December 2012.

In February 2015, Senex Energy discovered an oil pay zone at its Martlet North-1 exploration well on the western flank of the South Australian Cooper Basin.

In 2020 Senex sold its Cooper Basin Oil assets to Beach Energy ending its operations in the Basin to concentrate on its Surat Basin gas assets in Queensland.

On 13 December 2021, Senex agreed to be acquired by South Korean steel maker POSCO International for A$610 million.

In August 2022 Snex announced a $1 billion expansion to its Surat Basin gas operations with plans to increase production to 60 petajoules (PJ) per year from the end of 2025. The expansion was subsequently put on hold after the federal government announced its plans to cap energy prices for 12 months.
