= Dean Dalla Valle =

Dean Dalla Valle was born in Wollongong, New South Wales. Dalla Valle began his mining career at BHP in underground coal mining in the Illawarra region of New South Wales as a 17 year old electrical apprentice. After twenty years in coal he moved to the Pilbara region of Western Australia where he was Vice President - Port for West Australian Iron Ore (WAIO). Other positions Dalla Valle held at BHP include; president of Cannington silver mine in Queensland, president of Olympic Dam South Australia, president of the Uranium division based in Adelaide and president of the global Coal Division, based in Brisbane . His final role was Chief Commercial Officer, which included accountability for the Jansen potash project in Canada and the response to the Samarco disaster in Brazil. He finished his 40 year career with BHP in 2017. In recognition of his service with BHP the production shaft at the Jansen project was named after him.

After departing BHP Dalla Valle was CEO of Pacific National, a private Australian rail freight business from July 2017 to June 2021.

Dalla Valle served as the chair of the Wollongong 2022 Board that organised the September 2022 UCI Cycling Event

In February 2023, Dalla Valle was appointed the inaugural Chair of Hysata, an Australian electrolyser manufacturing company developing a 95% (41.5 kWh/kg) efficient electrolyser system targeting to deliver cost-competitive green hydrogen.

In June 2023 he joined the Board of Directors as Independent Non-Executive Director at Rio Tinto, drawing on his mining and renewable energy experience.
