= South Australian Chamber of Mines and Energy =

South Australian Chamber of Mines & Energy
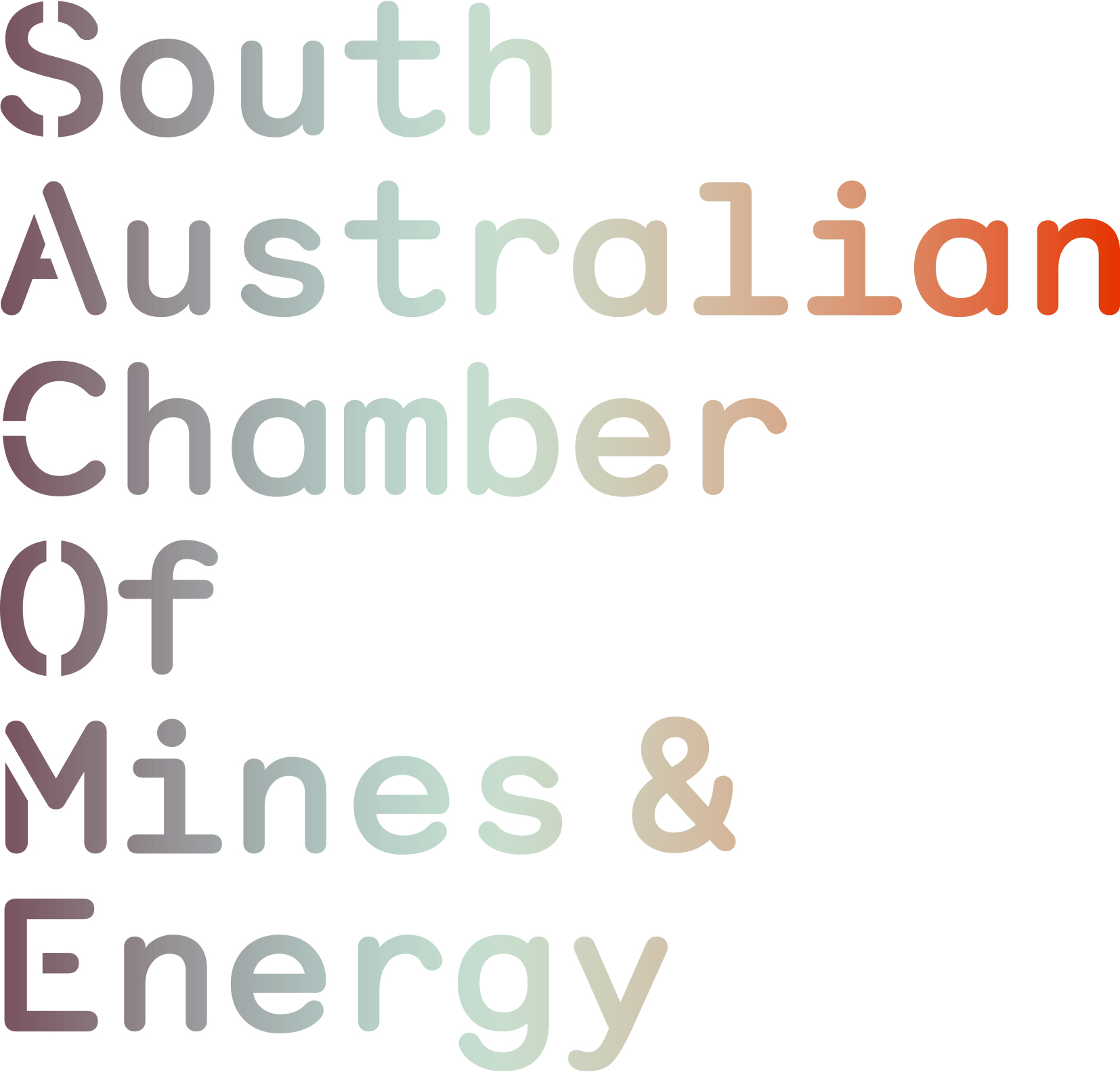
- Abbreviation: SACOME
- Type: NGO
- Legal status: Nonprofit organization
- President: Carl Kavina
- CEO: Catherine Mooney
- Website: www.sacome.org.au

The South Australian Chamber of Mines and Energy (SACOME) is a not-for-profit, non-government organisation founded in 1979. It represents over 100 companies involved in mining, petroleum, energy and associated services in South Australia.

== Role and activities ==
SACOME’s core function is to represent and advocate for the interests of the resources and energy sector in South Australia, with a focus on economic growth, investment, and industry sustainability.

Its activities include:

- Policy development and submissions to government
- Industry coordination through committees covering mining, exploration, and energy
- Stakeholder engagement with government, regulators and the community
- Publication of policy documents and strategic plans
- Support for workforce development and education initiatives

The organisation also promotes collaboration between industry and government to address regulatory challenges and enable project development across both traditional and emerging sectors.

== Policy and advocacy ==
SACOME develops policy positions on issues affecting the resources sector, including energy systems, infrastructure, and regulatory reform.

Recent priorities include:

- Energy reliability and affordability
- Development of critical minerals and metals supply chains
- Investment in infrastructure corridors
- Support for major projects such as the Northern Water Project
- Development of low‑carbon industries, including hydrogen and green iron and steel
- Workforce and skills development

SACOME also advocates for regulatory frameworks that support investment certainty and project development, emphasising the economic contribution of the resources sector.

=== Joint electricity purchasing group ===
SACOME established an electricity buying group of 27 South Australian businesses in 2017 to secure reliable electricity supply arrangements for its members at competitive prices. On 8 June 2018, an eight-year supply contract was signed with renewable energy retailer SIMEC ZEN Energy.

== Dirt TV awards ==
In 2014, SACOME launched Dirt TV, a competition to encourage school students in years 7 to 12 to produce short videos creatively promoting the resources sector. The inaugural award was won by high school students James Haskard and Daniel Blake of Concordia College. 14 entries were received and resource company sponsors provided a total prize pool of $10,000. The competition ran from 2014 to 2016.

== Council ==
SACOME is governed by a Council comprising representatives from member organisations, which sets the strategic direction of the association.

As of 2026:

- President: Carl Kavina
- Chief Executive Officer: Catherine Mooney (appointed December 2025)

The organisation operates from Adelaide with a small executive team supporting its advocacy and member services.

=== Past councils ===
2014:

- John Roberts – Mithril Resources (President)
- Terry Burgess – OZ Minerals (Vice President)
- Alice McCleary- Archer Exploration (Vice President)
- Simon Parsons – IMX Resources
- George McKenzie – Finlaysons
- Guy Roberts – Penrice Soda Products
- Mike Flynn – Santos
- David Cruickshanks-Boyd – Parsons Brinkerhoff
- Terry Kallis – Petratherm
- John McRae – Senex Energy
- Darryl Cuzzubbo – BHP
- Joe Ranford – Terramin
- Andrew Stocks – Iron Road Limited
- Yvonne Green – Iluka Resources

2015:

- John Roberts – Mithril Resources (President)
- Mike Flynn – Santos (Vice President)
- Yvonne Green – Iluka Resources (Vice President)
- George McKenzie – Finlaysons
- Darryl Cuzzubbo – BHP Billiton
- Terry Kallis – Kallis & Co
- Phil Cole – Senex Energy
- Joe Ranford – Terramin
- Andrew Stocks – Iron Road Limited
- Alison Snel – Flinders Port Holdings
- Greg Hall – Hillgrove Resources
- Patrick Mutz – Murray Zircon
- Jonathon Glew – Gypsum Resources
- Andrew Cole – OZ Minerals

2018:

- Greg Hall – Rex Minerals (President)
- Jacqui McGill – BHP (Vice President)
- Rob Malinauskas – Beach Energy (Vice President)
- Andrew Cannon – Adelaide Brighton Cement
- Andrew Dyda – Finlaysons
- Stewart Lammin – Flinders Port Holdings
- Mark Dayman – FYFE
- Steven McClare – Hillgrove Resources
- Hamish Little – Iluka Resources
- Andrew Cole – OZ Minerals
- Nicole Galloway Warland – PepinNini Lithium
- Matt Sherwell – Santos
- Wendy Roxbee – Senex Energy
- Vicki Brown

2020:

- Greg Hall (Rex Minerals) – President
- Matt Sherwell (Santos)
- Gabrielle Iwanow (OZ Minerals)
- Varis Lidums (Minotaur Exploration)
- Sarah Clarke (Piper Alderman)
- Nicholas Mumford (Mumford Commercial Consulting)
- Laura Tyler (BHP)
- Mark Dayman (FYFE)
- Wendy Roxbee (Senex Energy)
- Hamish Little (Iluka Resources)
- Rebecca Knol (CEO, SACOME)
