= Anti-nuclear movement in Australia =

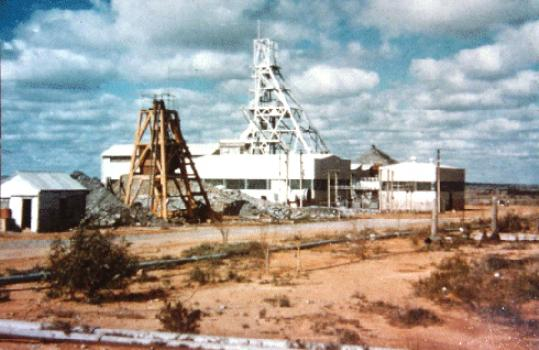
Radium Hill, a former minesite in South Australia which operated from 1906 until 1961. It was Australia's first uranium mine, years before the country's next major mines at Rum Jungle in the Northern Territory (opened in 1950), and the Mary Kathleen mine in Queensland (1958).

Nuclear weapons testing, uranium mining and export, and nuclear power have often been the subject of public debate in Australia, and the anti-nuclear movement in Australia has a long history. Its origins date back to the 1972–1973 debate over French nuclear testing in the Pacific and the 1976–1977 debate about uranium mining in Australia.

Several groups specifically concerned with nuclear issues were established in the mid-1970s, including the Movement Against Uranium Mining and Campaign Against Nuclear Energy (CANE), cooperating with other environmental groups such as Friends of the Earth and the Australian Conservation Foundation. The movement suffered a setback in 1983 when the newly elected Labor Government failed to implement its stated policy of stopping uranium mining. But by the late 1980s, the price of uranium had fallen, the costs of nuclear power had risen, and the anti-nuclear movement seemed to have won its case; CANE was disbanded in 1988.

As of 2015, Australia has no nuclear power stations and five uranium mines, four of which are located in South Australia. Olympic Dam (Roxby Downs) is a large underground mine, Beverley, Four Mile and Honeymoon are in-situ leach mines and Ranger is an open pit mine in the Northern Territory. As of 2021 only two mines are operating (Olympic Dam and Four Mile) following the closure of Beverley and Ranger and the placement of Honeymoon into care-and-maintenance. Uranium mined in Australia is mainly for export. Australia has no nuclear weapons or nuclear-powered vessels.

== History ==
=== 1950s and 1960s ===
Map showing nuclear test sites in Australia

In 1952 the Australian Government established the Rum Jungle Uranium Mine 85 kilometres (53 mi) south of Darwin. Local Aboriginal communities were not consulted to the extent of a formal treaty or agreement about mining and the mine site became an emblem for environmental disaster, with a small area of disturbance easily repaired and remedied.

Also in 1952, the Liberal Government passed legislation, the Defence (Special Undertakings) Act 1952, which allowed the British Government access to remote parts of Australia to undertake atmospheric nuclear weapons tests. The general public were largely unaware of the risks from the testing program, stemming from official secrecy about the testing program and the remote locations of the test sites. But as the "Ban the Bomb" movement gathered momentum in Western societies throughout the 1950s, so too did opposition to the British tests in Australia. An opinion poll taken in 1957 showed 49 per cent of the Australian public were opposed to the tests and only 39 per cent in favour.

In 1963, Australia was one of the first signatories to a Partial Nuclear Test Ban Treaty. In 1964, very small Peace Marches which featured "Ban the bomb" placards, were held in several Australian capital cities.

In 1969, a 500 MW nuclear power plant was proposed for the Jervis Bay Territory, 200 kilometres (120 mi) south of Sydney. A local opposition campaign began, and the South Coast Trades and Labour Council (covering workers in the region) announced that it would refuse to build the reactor. Some environmental studies and site works were completed, and two rounds of tenders were called and evaluated, but in 1971 the Australian government decided not to proceed with the project, citing economic reasons.

=== 1970s ===
The Ranger uranium deposits were first discovered by a joint venture between Peko-Wallsend and Electrolytic Zinc Corporation, by airborne survey radiometric signals in October 1969. Remoteness and difficult terrain set the pace of ground investigation, but by about 1972 there was confidence that the Northern Territory of Australia hosted the largest and richest uranium deposits then known to the world.

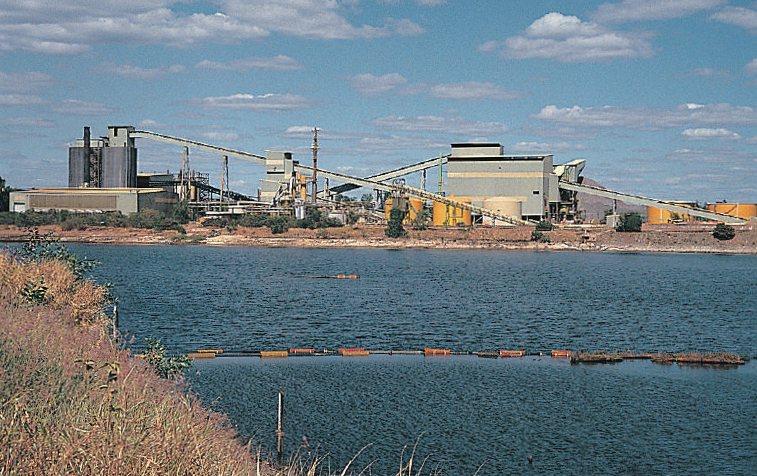
Ranger Uranium Mine in Kakadu National Park

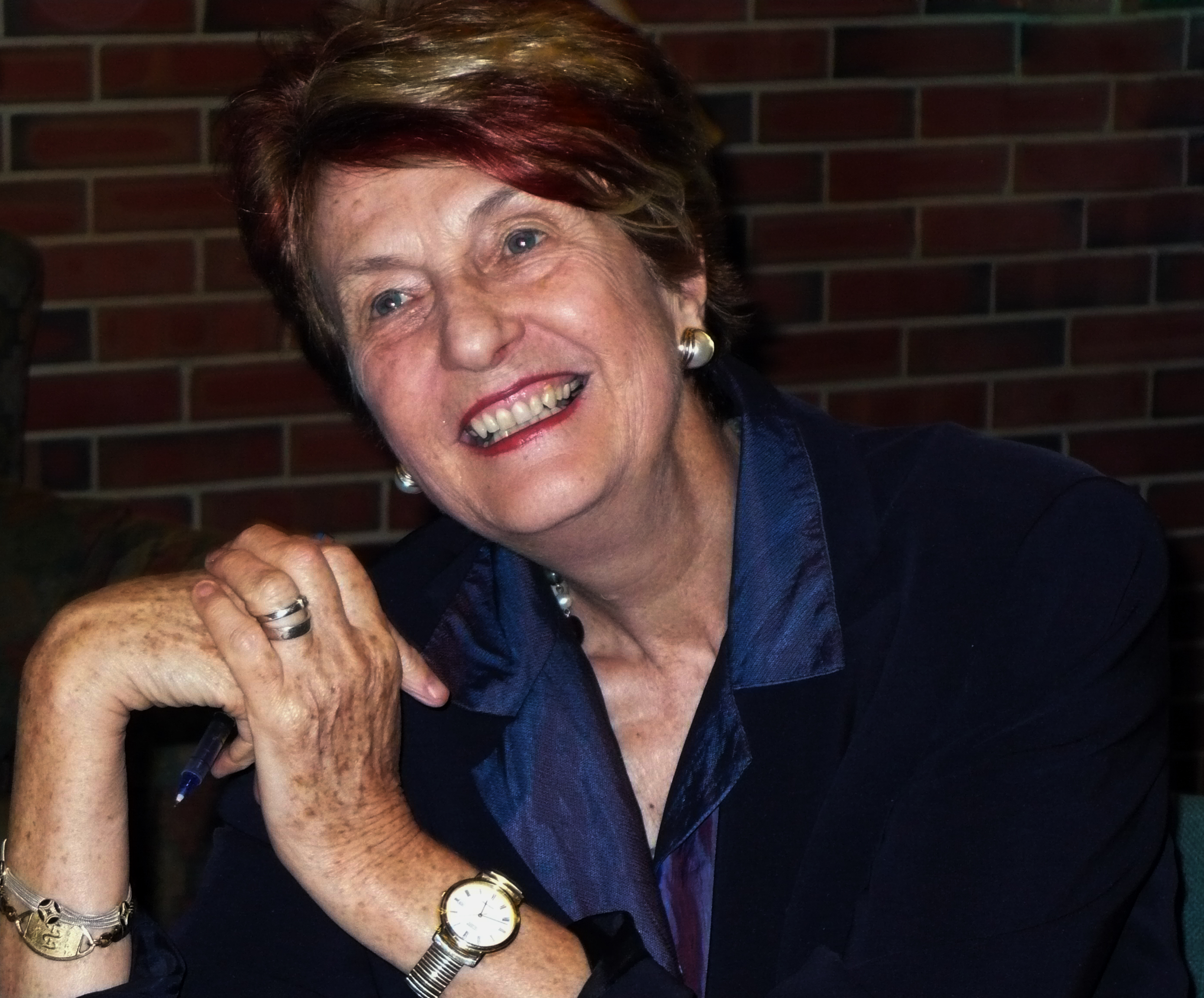
Anti-nuclear campaigner Dr Helen Caldicott

The 1972–73 debate over French nuclear testing in the Pacific mobilised several groups, including some trade unions. In 1972 the International Court of Justice in a case launched by Australia and New Zealand, and advocated by Dr Helen Caldicott, ordered that the French cease atmospheric nuclear testing at Mururoa atoll. In 1973 Australia's concerns saw it as a champion and an early adopter of the Treaty on the Non-Proliferation of Nuclear Weapons, and around this time, the Government ratified the Seabed Arms Control Treaty. Shortly after this, the Government negotiated with the International Atomic Energy Agency to put in safeguards to ensure Australia could mine and export nuclear material but not breach the intent of the Nuclear Non-Proliferation Treaty.

In 1974 and 1975 concern came to focus on uranium mining in Australia and several Friends of the Earth groups were formed. The Australian Conservation Foundation also began voicing concern about uranium mining and supporting the activities of the grass-roots organisations. Concern about the environmental effects of uranium mining was a significant factor and poor management of waste at an early uranium mine, Rum Jungle, led it to become a significant pollution problem in the 1970s. The Australian anti-nuclear movement also acquired initial impetus from notable individuals who publicly voiced nuclear concerns, such as nuclear scientists Richard Temple and Rob Robotham, and poets Dorothy Green and Judith Wright.

In 1975, Moss Cass, Minister for the Environment and Conservation, led parliamentarians and ALP branch members in expressing concerns about the effects of uranium mining. A key concern was the adverse effect that uranium mining would have on the northern Aboriginal people. Cass said: "nuclear energy creates the most dangerous, insidious and persistent waste products, ever experienced on the planet".

The years 1976 and 1977 saw uranium mining become a major political issue, with the Ranger Inquiry (Fox) report opening up a public debate about uranium mining. Several groups specifically concerned with nuclear issues were established, including the Movement Against Uranium Mining (founded in 1976) and Campaign Against Nuclear Energy (formed in South Australia in 1976), cooperating with other environmental groups such as Friends of the Earth (which came to Australia in 1975) and the Australian Conservation Foundation (formed in 1975).

In November and December 1976, 7,000 people marched through the streets of Australian cities, protesting against uranium mining. The Uranium Moratorium group was formed and it called for a five-year moratorium on uranium mining. In April 1977 the first national demonstration co-ordinated by the Uranium Moratorium brought around 15,000 demonstrators into the streets of Melbourne, 5,000 in Sydney, and smaller numbers elsewhere. A National signature campaign attracted over 250,000 signatures calling for a five-year moratorium. In August, another demonstration brought 50,000 people out nationally and the opposition to uranium mining looked like a potential political force. During 1977 environmentalists also disrupted the loading of yellowcake for export at Sydney's Glebe Island container terminal.

In 1977, the National Conference of the Australian Labor Party (ALP) passed a motion in favour of an indefinite moratorium on uranium mining, and the anti-nuclear movement acted to support the Labor Party and help it regain office. However, a setback for the movement occurred in 1982 when another ALP conference overturned its anti-uranium policy in favour of a "one mine policy". After the ALP won power in 1983, its 1984 National Conference voted in favour of a "Three mine policy". This referred to the then three existing uranium mines in Australia, Nabarlek, Ranger and Roxby Downs/Olympic Dam, and articulated ALP support for pre-existing mines and contracts, but opposition to any new mining.

In 1977–78, the Government of Western Australia, under the leadership of Charles Court, announced plans for a nuclear power reactor near Perth. 1977 was seen as the year of mass mobilization in Western Australia, with 300 at the first anti-nuclear demonstration to 9,000 at the third protest in the inner city of Perth. Despite public protest, the Government of Western Australia selected a first site for a nuclear reactor in 1979 at Wilbinga, 70 kilometres (43 mi) north of Perth. Court predicted that at least another 20 nuclear power plants would be needed by the end of the century to meet rapidly growing power demand, but all of this never eventuated.

From the late 1970s, a number of agreements were signed enabling the potential peaceful export (and import) of nuclear material:

- In July 1978 with Finland
- August 1978 with the United States of America
- August 1978 with the Philippines
- May 1979 with South Korea
- July 1979, with the United Kingdom
- October 1980, with France for ultimate use by Japan
- March 1981, with Canada

These International agreements created a market for Australia to mine and export uranium.

=== 1980s and 1990s ===
Between 1979 and 1984, the majority of what is now Kakadu National Park was created, surrounding but not including the Ranger uranium mine. Tension between mining and conservation values led to long running controversy around mining in the Park region.

The two themes for the 1980 Hiroshima Day march and rally in Sydney, sponsored by the Movement Against Uranium Mining (MAUM), were: "Keep uranium in the ground" and "No to nuclear war." Later that year, the Sydney city council officially proclaimed Sydney nuclear-free, in an action similar to that taken by many other local councils throughout Australia.

In the 1980s, academic critics (such as Jim Falk) discussed the "deadly connection" between uranium mining, nuclear reactors and nuclear weapons, linking Australia's nuclear policy to nuclear proliferation and the "plutonium economy". Construction and mining at Roxby Dows was blockaded in separate protests during 1983 and 1984 and an anti-nuclear vigil held in between them.

In the 1980s, Australia experienced a significant growth of nuclear disarmament activism:

On Palm Sunday 1982, an estimated 100,000 Australians participated in anti-nuclear rallies in the nation's biggest cities. Growing year by year, the rallies drew 350,000 participants in 1985. The movement focused on halting Australia's uranium mining and exports, abolishing nuclear weapons, removing foreign military bases from Australia's soil, and creating a nuclear-free Pacific. Public opinion surveys found that about half of Australians opposed uranium mining and export, as well as the visits of U.S. nuclear warships, that 72 percent thought the use of nuclear weapons could never be justified, and that 80 percent favoured building a nuclear-free world.

The Nuclear Disarmament Party won a Senate seat in 1984, but soon faded from the political scene. The years of the Hawke-Keating ALP governments (1983–1996) were characterised by an "uneasy standoff in the uranium debate". The ALP acknowledged community feeling against uranium mining but was reluctant to move against the industry.

The 1986 Palm Sunday anti-nuclear rallies drew 250,000 people. In Melbourne, the seamen's union boycotted the arrival of foreign nuclear warships.

Australia's only nuclear energy education facility, the former School of Nuclear Engineering at the University of New South Wales, closed in 1986.

By the late 1980s, the price of uranium had fallen, and the costs of nuclear power had risen, and the anti-nuclear movement seemed to have won its case. The Campaign Against Nuclear Energy disbanded itself in 1988, two years after the Chernobyl Disaster.

The government policy preventing new uranium mines continued into the 1990s, despite occasional reviews and debate. Following protest marches in Sydney, Melbourne and Brisbane during 1998, a proposed mine at Jabiluka was blocked.

Also in 1998, there was a proposal from an international consortium, Pangea Resources, to establish a nuclear waste dump in Western Australia. The plan, to store 20 per cent of the world's spent nuclear fuel and weapons material, was "publicly condemned and abandoned".

=== 2000s ===
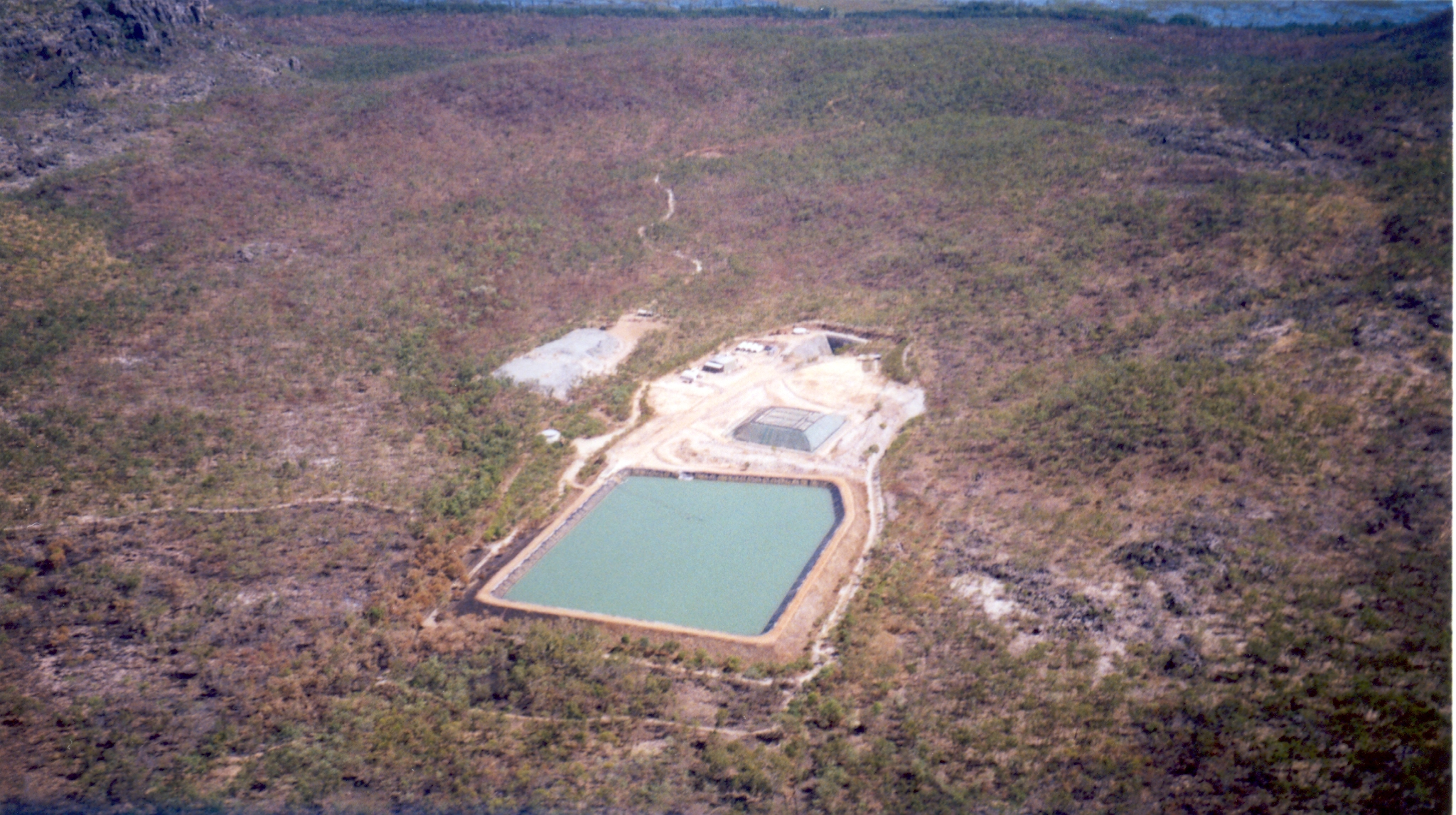
Aerial view of the Ranger 3 site located within Kakadu National Park.

In 2000, the Ranger Uranium Mine in the Northern Territory and the Roxby Downs/Olympic Dam mine in South Australia continued to operate, but Nabarlek Uranium Mine had closed. A third uranium mine, Beverley Uranium Mine in SA, was also operating. Several advanced projects, such as Honeymoon in SA, Jabiluka in the Northern Territory and Yeelirrie in WA were on hold because of political and indigenous opposition.

In May 2000 there was an anti-nuclear demonstration at the Beverley Uranium Mine, which involved about 100 protesters. Ten of the protesters were mistreated by police and were later awarded more than A$700,000 in damages from the South Australian government.

Following the McClelland Royal Commission, a large clean-up was completed in outback South Australia in 2000, after nuclear testing at Maralinga during the 1950s contaminated the region. The cleanup lasted three years, and cost over $100 million, but there was controversy over the methods used and success of the operation.

On 17 December 2001, 46 Greenpeace activists occupied the Lucas Heights facility to protest the construction of a second research reactor. Protestors gained access to the grounds, the HIFAR reactor, the high-level radioactive waste store and the radio tower. Their protest highlighted the security and environmental risks of the production of nuclear materials and the shipment of radioactive waste from the facility.

As uranium prices began rising from about 2003, proponents of nuclear power advocated it as a solution to global warming and the Australian government began taking an interest. However, in June 2005, the Senate passed a motion opposing nuclear power for Australia. Then, in November 2006, the House of Representatives Standing Committee on Industry and Resources released a pro-nuclear report into Australia's uranium. In late 2006 and early 2007, then Prime Minister John Howard made widely reported statements in favour of nuclear power, on environmental grounds.

Faced with these proposals to examine nuclear power as a possible response to climate change, anti-nuclear campaigners and scientists in Australia emphasised claims that nuclear power could not significantly substitute for other power sources, and that uranium mining itself could become a significant source of greenhouse gas emissions. Anti-nuclear campaigns were given added impetus by public concern about the sites for possible reactors: fears exploited by anti-nuclear power political parties in the lead-up to a national election in 2007.

The Rudd Labor government elected in 2007 opposed nuclear power for Australia. The anti-nuclear movement continues to be active in Australia, opposing expansion of existing uranium mines, lobbying against the development of nuclear power in Australia, and criticising proposals for nuclear waste disposal sites, the main candidate being Muckaty station in the Northern Territory. Following campaigning and litigation, that project was cancelled as well as other planned waste dumps near Woomera and at Wallerberdina and Kimba in South Australia.

By April 2009, construction had begun on South Australia's third uranium mine—the Honeymoon Uranium Mine. In October 2009, the Australian government was continuing to plan for a nuclear waste dump in the Northern Territory. However, there was opposition from indigenous people, the NT government, and wider NT community. In November 2009, about 100 anti-nuclear protesters assembled outside the Alice Springs parliamentary sittings, urging the Northern Territory Government not to approve a nearby uranium mine site.

=== 2010s ===
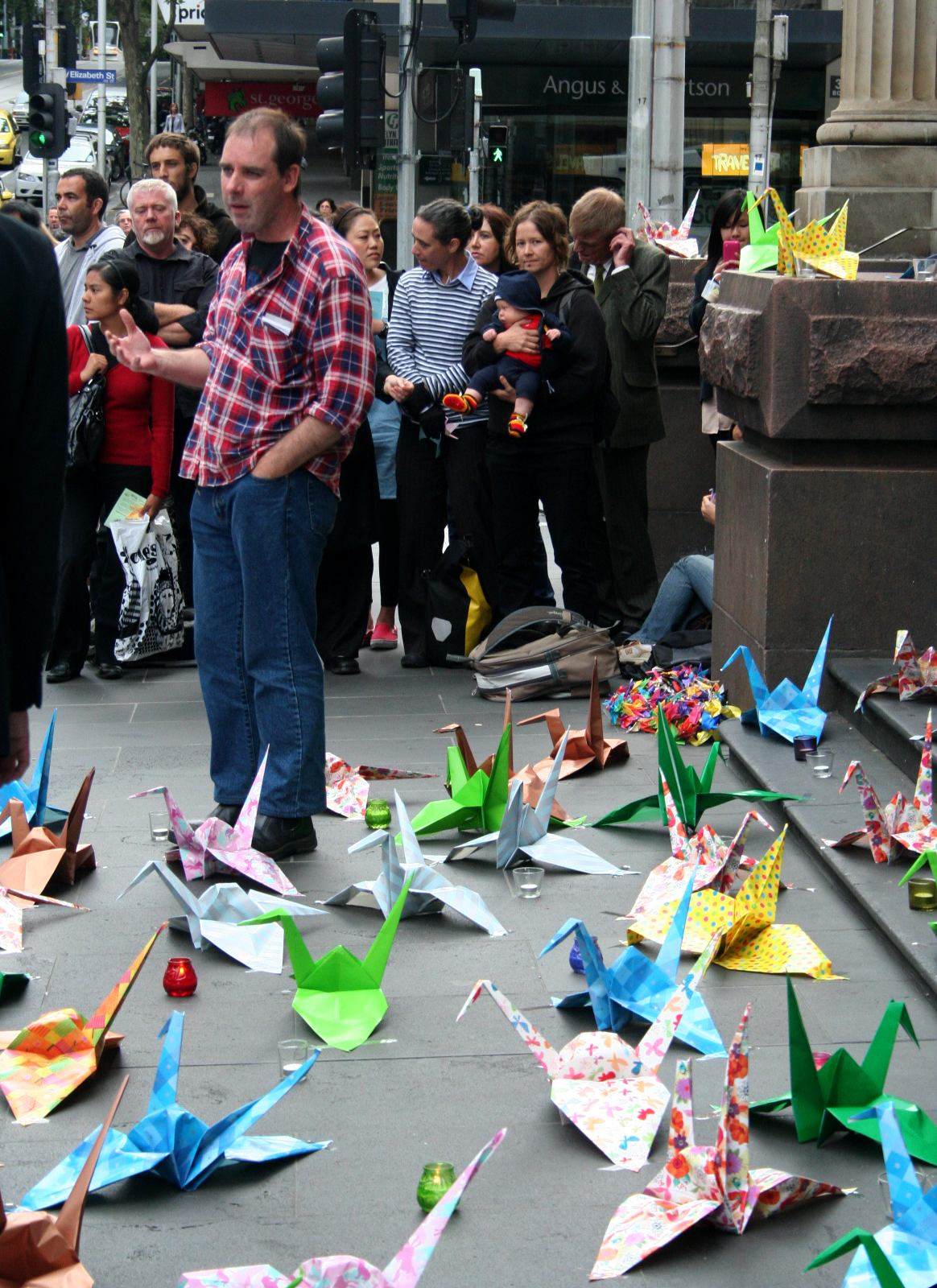
Australian anti-nuclear campaigner Jim Green at Melbourne's GPO in March 2011

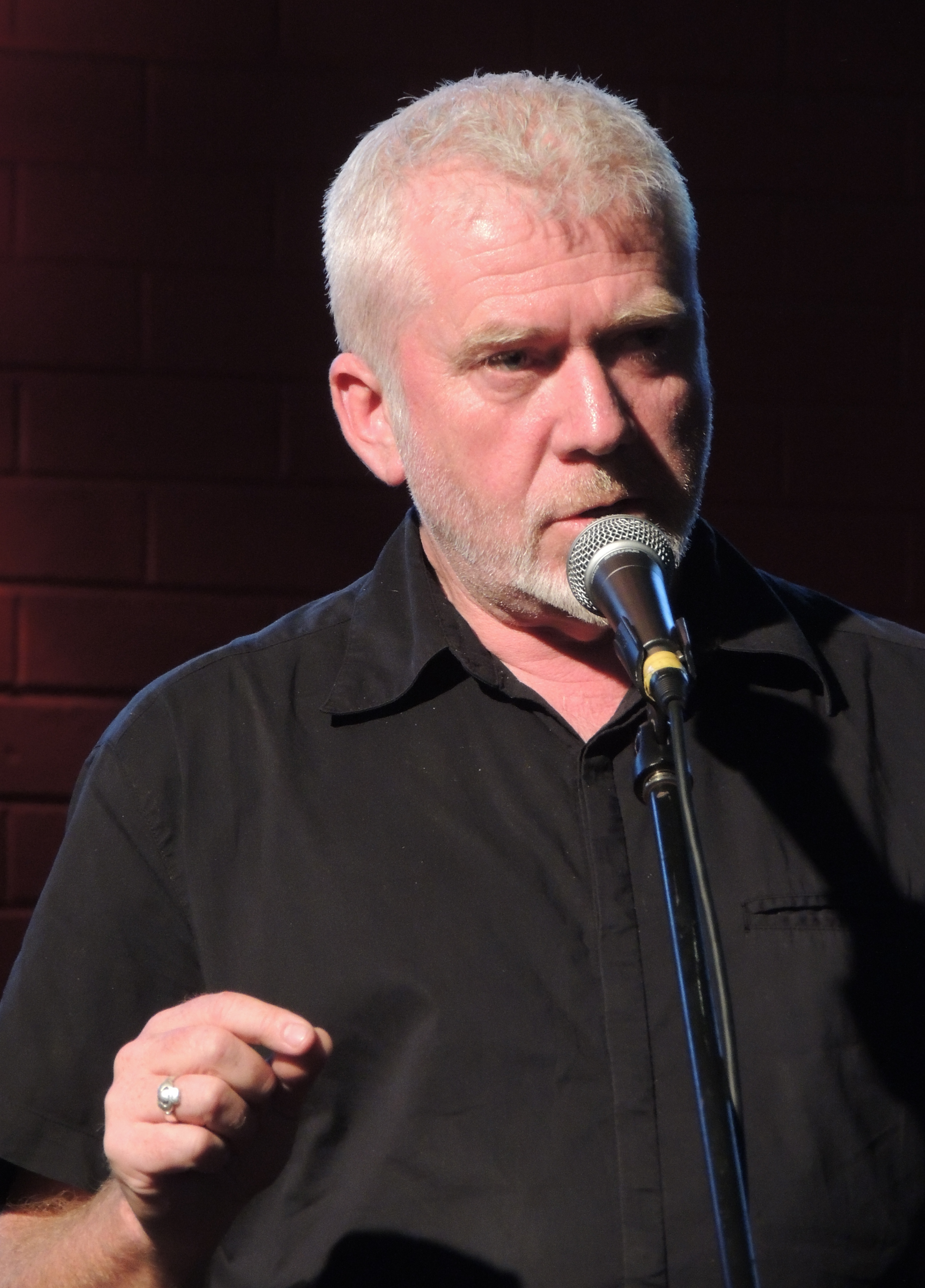
Australian Conservation Foundation anti-nuclear campaigner, Dave Sweeney (2014)

As of 2016, Australia has no nuclear power stations and the former Gillard Labor government was opposed to nuclear power for Australia. Australia has three operating uranium mines at Olympic Dam (Roxby) and Beverley – both in South Australia's north – and at Ranger in the Northern Territory. Australia has no nuclear weapons. Australia operates a research reactor which produces medical radioisotopes at OPAL.

As of early April 2010, more than 200 environmentalists and indigenous people gathered in Tennant Creek to oppose a radioactive waste dump being built on Muckaty Station in the Northern Territory.

Western Australia has a significant share of the Australia's uranium reserves, but between 2002 and 2008, a statewide ban on uranium mining was in force. The ban was lifted when the Liberal Party was voted into power in the state and, as of 2010, many companies are exploring for uranium in Western Australia. One of the industry's major players, the mining company BHP, planned to develop the Yeelirrie uranium project in a 17 billion dollar project. Two other projects in Western Australia are further advanced then BHP's Yeelirrie, these being the Lake Way uranium project, which is pursued by Toro Energy, and the Lake Maitland uranium project, pursued by Mega Uranium. But it is unlikely that any new projects will enter active development until the market improves. As of 2013 uranium prices are very low.

As of late 2010, there are calls for Australians to debate whether the nation should adopt nuclear power as part of its energy mix. Nuclear power is seen to be "a divisive issue that can arouse deep passions among those for and against".

Following the March 2011 Fukushima nuclear emergency in Japan, where three nuclear reactors were damaged by explosions, Ian Lowe sees the nuclear power option as being risky and unworkable for Australia. Lowe says nuclear power is too expensive, with insurmountable problems associated with waste disposal and weapons proliferation. It is also not a fast enough response to address climate change. Lowe advocates renewable energy which is "quicker, less expensive and less dangerous than nuclear".

Nuclear reactors are banned in Queensland and Tasmania. Uranium mining was previously prohibited in New South Wales under the Uranium Prohibition Act of 1986, however in 2012 Premier Barry O'Farrell amended the legislation to allow prospecting and mining of uranium in New South Wales.

In December 2011, the sale of uranium to India was a contentious issue. MPs clashed over the issue and protesters were marched from Sydney's convention centre before Prime Minister Julia Gillard's motion to remove a party ban on uranium sales to India was narrowly supported 206 votes to 185. Long-time anti-nuclear campaigner Peter Garrett MP spoke against the motion.

In March 2012, hundreds of anti-nuclear demonstrators converged on the Australian headquarters of global mining giants BHP Billiton and Rio Tinto. The 500-strong march through southern Melbourne called for an end to uranium mining in Australia, and included speeches and performances by representatives of the expatriate Japanese community as well as Australia's Indigenous communities, who are concerned about the effects of uranium mining near tribal lands. There were also events in Sydney.

A site within Muckaty Station was considered for Australia's low-level and intermediate-level radioactive waste storage and disposal facility. However, the plan was withdrawn following a High Court hearing, and one of the seven clans of traditional owners of Muckaty Station, the Ngapa clan, served papers on the Northern Land Council over the way the process was handled.

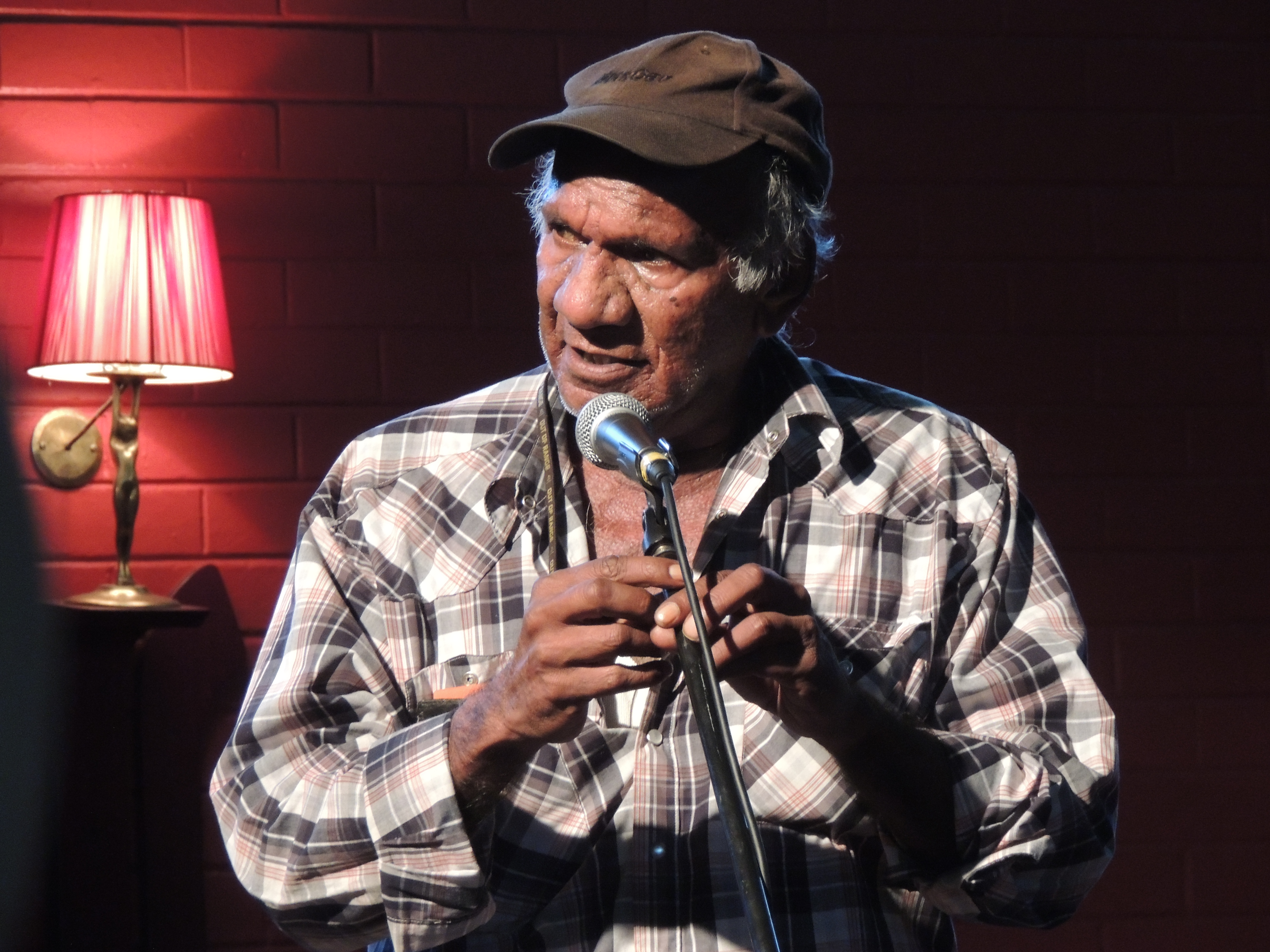
Uncle Kevin Buzzacott (2014)

More than 400 people joined a "Lizard's Revenge march" to the Olympic Dam site in July 2012. The anti-nuclear activists, including Elder Kevin Buzzacott, protested against the mine expansion and the uranium industry. They say the company and the government have put short-term economic gain ahead of environmental and health concerns. Organiser Nectaria Calan said police harassed protesters, demanding identification and controlling access to and from their campsite. In August 2012, BHP Billiton announced that the expansion was being postponed indefinitely pending investigation of a "new and cheaper design".

Historically, many prospective Australian uranium mines have been constrained by active antinuclear opposition, but state governments have now approved mine development in Western Australia and Queensland. But it is unlikely that any new projects will enter active development until the market improves. As of 2013 uranium prices are very low. Cameco placed the Kintyre project on hold until market prices improve and Paladin has stated that its project proposals (Bigrlyi, Angela/Pamela, Manyingee, Oobagooma, and Valhalla/Skal) need higher uranium market prices before they can proceed. Toro wants to take the Wiluna proposal to the development phase, but has not been successful in attracting equity investors. When market prices go up again, so that mine development is justified, most projects would need at least five years to proceed to production.

In 2013, Prime Minister Tony Abbott supported nuclear power, saying: "nuclear power is the only proven way of generating the base load power Australia needed without producing carbon pollution". Abbott's Coalition's Resources and Energy policy says "the Coalition will formalise the agreement to sell uranium to India". In 2016 under Malcolm Turnbull, both Australian political parties opened the door for uranium exports to India, with trade potentially starting in 2017.

In 2015, South Australian Premier Jay Weatherill announced that a Royal Commission would be held to investigate the state's role in the nuclear fuel cycle. South Australia is currently home to four of Australia's five uranium mines, and the possibility of the state developing nuclear power generation, enrichment and waste storage facilities have previously proven to be contentious issues. The Royal Commission comes at a time of economic contraction for South Australia, which is suffering from job losses in mining and manufacturing sectors. Immediately following the announcement of the Royal Commission, emeritus Prof. Ian Lowe suggested that the current inquiry risks retreading old ground already covered by several previous public inquiries and proposals for nuclear industrialisation. Lowe referred to the 2006 UMPNER review's finding that substantial government subsidies would be required to support nuclear industrial development in Australia, and the 1976–78 Ranger Uranium Environmental Inquiry (Fox Report), which drew attention to the problems of nuclear weapons proliferation and nuclear waste. On 17 April 2015, Lowe was selected as one of five members of the Nuclear Fuel Cycle Royal Commission Expert Advisory Committee.

=== 2020s ===
In 2024, Peter Dutton said he intends, if elected, to build seven government-owned nuclear power plants in five states to be operational by 2035–2037. The sites for these nuclear power plants are all former coal-fired power stations:

- Tarong Power Station in Tarong, Queensland
- Callide Power Station at Mount Murchison, Queensland
- Liddell Power Station near Muswellbrook, New South Wales
- Mount Piper Power Station near Portland, New South Wales
- Northern Power Station at Port Paterson, South Australia
- Loy Yang Power Station in Traralgon, Victoria
- Muja Power Station near Collie, Western Australia

== Issues ==
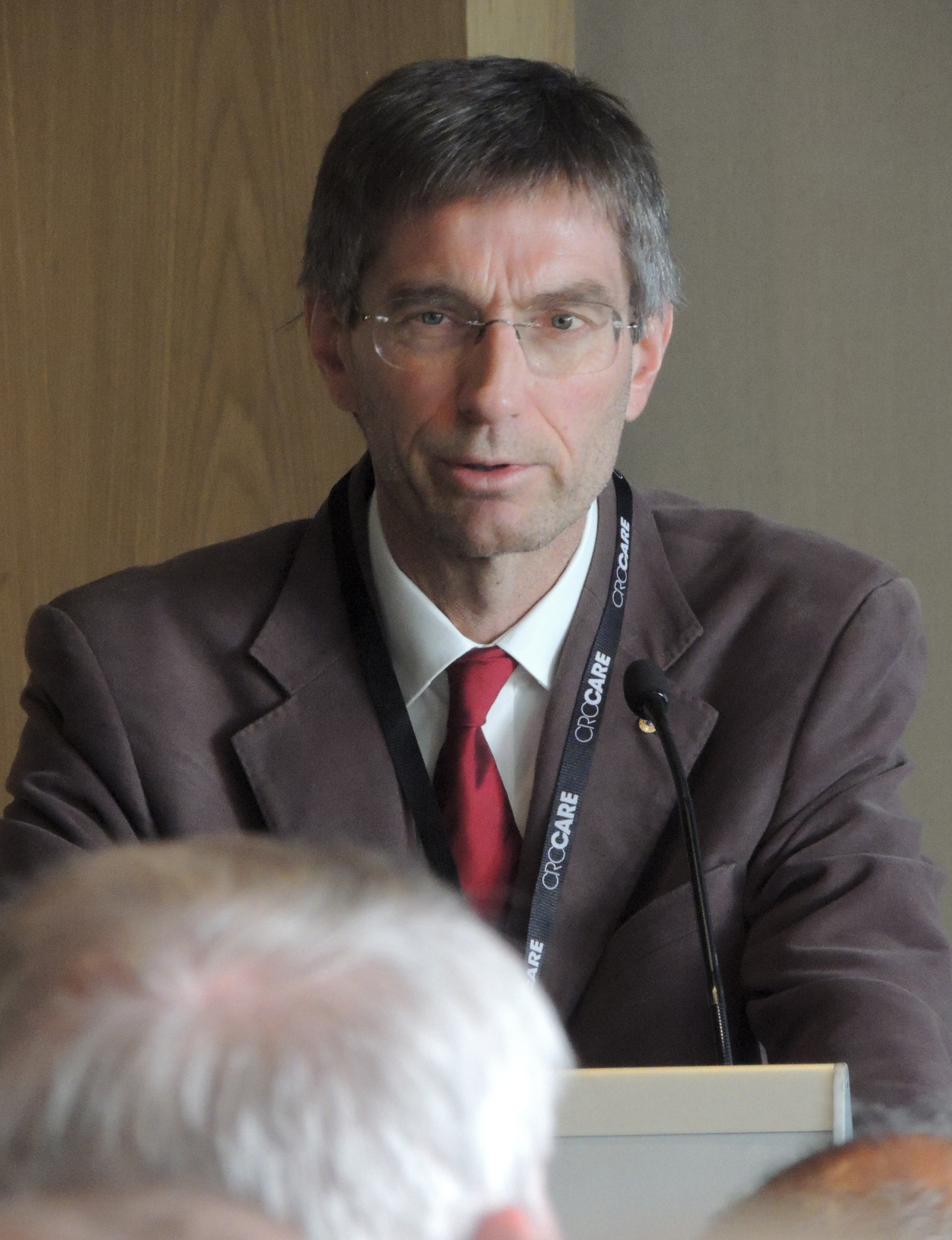
Tilman Ruff AM is an Australian medical doctor who has focused on "the global health imperative to eradicate nuclear weapons".

The case against nuclear power and uranium mining in Australia has been concerned with the environmental, political, economic, social and cultural impacts of nuclear energy; with the shortcomings of nuclear power as an energy source; and with presenting a sustainable energy strategy. The most prominent adverse impact of nuclear power is seen to be its potential contribution towards proliferation of nuclear weapons. For example, the 1976 Ranger Inquiry report stated that "The nuclear power industry is unintentionally contributing to an increased risk of nuclear war. This is the most serious hazard associated with the industry".

The health risks associated with nuclear materials have also featured prominently in Australian anti-nuclear campaigns. This has been the case worldwide because of accidents like the Chernobyl disaster, but Australian concerns have also involved specific local factors such as controversy over the health effects of nuclear testing in Australia and the South Pacific, and the emergence of prominent anti-nuclear campaigners Helen Caldicott and Tilman Ruff, who are medical practitioners.

The economics of nuclear power has been a factor in anti-nuclear campaigns, with critics arguing that such power is uneconomical in Australia, particularly given the country's abundance of coal resources.

According to the anti-nuclear movement, most of the problems with nuclear power today are much the same as in the 1970s. Nuclear reactor accidents still occur and there is no convincing solution to the problem of long-lived radioactive waste. Nuclear weapons proliferation continues to occur, notably in Pakistan and North Korea, building on facilities and expertise from civilian nuclear operations. The alternatives to nuclear power, efficient energy use and renewable energy (especially wind power), have been further developed and commercialised.

== Public opinion ==
A 2009 poll conducted by the Uranium Information Centre found that Australians in the 40 to 55 years age group are the "most trenchantly opposed to nuclear power". This generation was raised during the Cold War, experienced the anti-nuclear movement of the 1970s, witnessed the 1979 partial meltdown of the Three Mile Island reactor in the US, and the 1986 Chernobyl disaster. It was the generation which was also subject to cultural influences including feature films such as the "nuclear industry conspiracies" The China Syndrome and Silkwood and the apocalyptic Dr Strangelove. Younger people are "less resistant" to the idea of nuclear power in Australia. Analysis of opinion polls from 2012 shows a "significant decrease in favourable views of nuclear power" following the Fukushima Daiichi nuclear disaster.

Indigenous land owners have consistently opposed uranium mining and have spoken out about the adverse impact it has on their communities. The British nuclear tests at Maralinga were found to have left significant radiation hazards in land given back to the Maralinga Tjarutja people, and the issue continues to cause indigenous opposition.

== Active groups ==
- Anti-Nuclear Alliance of Western Australia
- Australian Conservation Foundation
- Australian Greens
- Australian Nuclear Free Alliance
- Conservation Council of South Australia
- Cycle Against the Nuclear Cycle
- EnergyScience
- Everybody for a Nuclear Free Future
- Friends of the Earth Australia
- Greenpeace Australia Pacific
- Kupa Piti Kungka Tjuta
- Medical Association for Prevention of War
- Mineral Policy Institute
- Nuclear Operations Watch Port Adelaide (NOWPA)
- Peace Organisation of Australia
- The Australia Institute
- The Sustainable Energy and Anti-Uranium Service Inc.
- The Wilderness Society
- Women Against Nuclear Energy

== Individuals ==
There are several prominent Australians who have publicly expressed anti-nuclear views:

- Dorothy Auchterlonie
- David Bradbury (film maker)
- Bob Brown
- Eileen Kampakuta Brown
- Kevin Buzzacott
- Helen Caldicott
- Joseph Camilleri
- Moss Cass
- Ian Cohen
- Michael Denborough
- Mark Diesendorf
- Jim Falk
- Malcolm Fraser
- Peter Garrett
- Jim Green (activist)
- Margaret Holmes
- Avon Hudson
- Jacqui Katona
- Sandra Kanck
- Ian Lowe
- Scott Ludlam
- Yvonne Margarula
- Dee Margetts
- Jillian Marsh
- Kerry Nettle
- David Noonan (environmentalist)
- John Quiggin
- Mia Pepper
- Tilman Ruff
- Nancy Shelley
- Dave Sweeney
- Jo Vallentine
- Giz Watson
- Peter Watts
- Patrick White
- Stuart White
- Bill Williams
- Eileen Wani Wingfield

== See also ==
- Anti-nuclear protests
- Arkaroola, South Australia
- Australian Renewable Energy Agency
- Australian Uranium Association
- Fallout and Follow Me (1977 play)
- Gavin Mudd
- History of the anti-nuclear movement
- International Commission on Nuclear Non-proliferation and Disarmament
- List of anti-nuclear groups
- List of Australian inquiries into uranium mining
- List of environmental accidents in the fossil fuel industry in Australia
- Lists of nuclear disasters and radioactive incidents
- Nuclear industry in South Australia
- Renewable energy commercialization
- Renewable energy in Australia
- Say Yes demonstrations

== Bibliography ==
- Cooke, Stephanie (2009). In Mortal Hands: A Cautionary History of the Nuclear Age, Black Inc.
- Diesendorf, Mark (2009). Climate Action: A Campaign Manual for Greenhouse Solutions, University of New South Wales Press.
- Diesendorf, Mark (2007). Greenhouse Solutions with Sustainable Energy, University of New South Wales Press.
- Elliott, David (2007). Nuclear or Not? Does Nuclear Power Have a Place in a Sustainable Energy Future?, Palgrave.
- Falk, Jim (1982). Global Fission: The Battle Over Nuclear Power, Oxford University Press.
- Giugni, Marco (2004). Social Protest and Policy Change: Ecology, Antinuclear, and Peace Movements in Comparative Perspective, Rowman and Littlefield.
- Lovins, Amory B. (1977). Soft Energy Paths: Towards a Durable Peace, Friends of the Earth International, ISBN 0-06-090653-7
- Lovins, Amory B. and Price, John H. (1975). Non-Nuclear Futures: The Case for an Ethical Energy Strategy, Ballinger Publishing Company, 1975, ISBN 0-88410-602-0
- Lowe, Ian (2007). Reaction Time: Climate Change and the Nuclear Option, Quarterly Essay.
- Parkinson, Alan (2007). Maralinga: Australia’s Nuclear Waste Cover-up, ABC Books.
- Pernick, Ron and Wilder, Clint (2012). Clean Tech Nation: How the U.S. Can Lead in the New Global Economy, HarperCollins.
- Schneider, Mycle and Antony Froggatt, (2012). The World Nuclear Industry Status Report.
- Smith, Jennifer (Editor), (2002). The Antinuclear Movement, Cengage Gale.
- Walker, J. Samuel (2004). Three Mile Island: A Nuclear Crisis in Historical Perspective, University of California Press.
