= Avon Hudson =

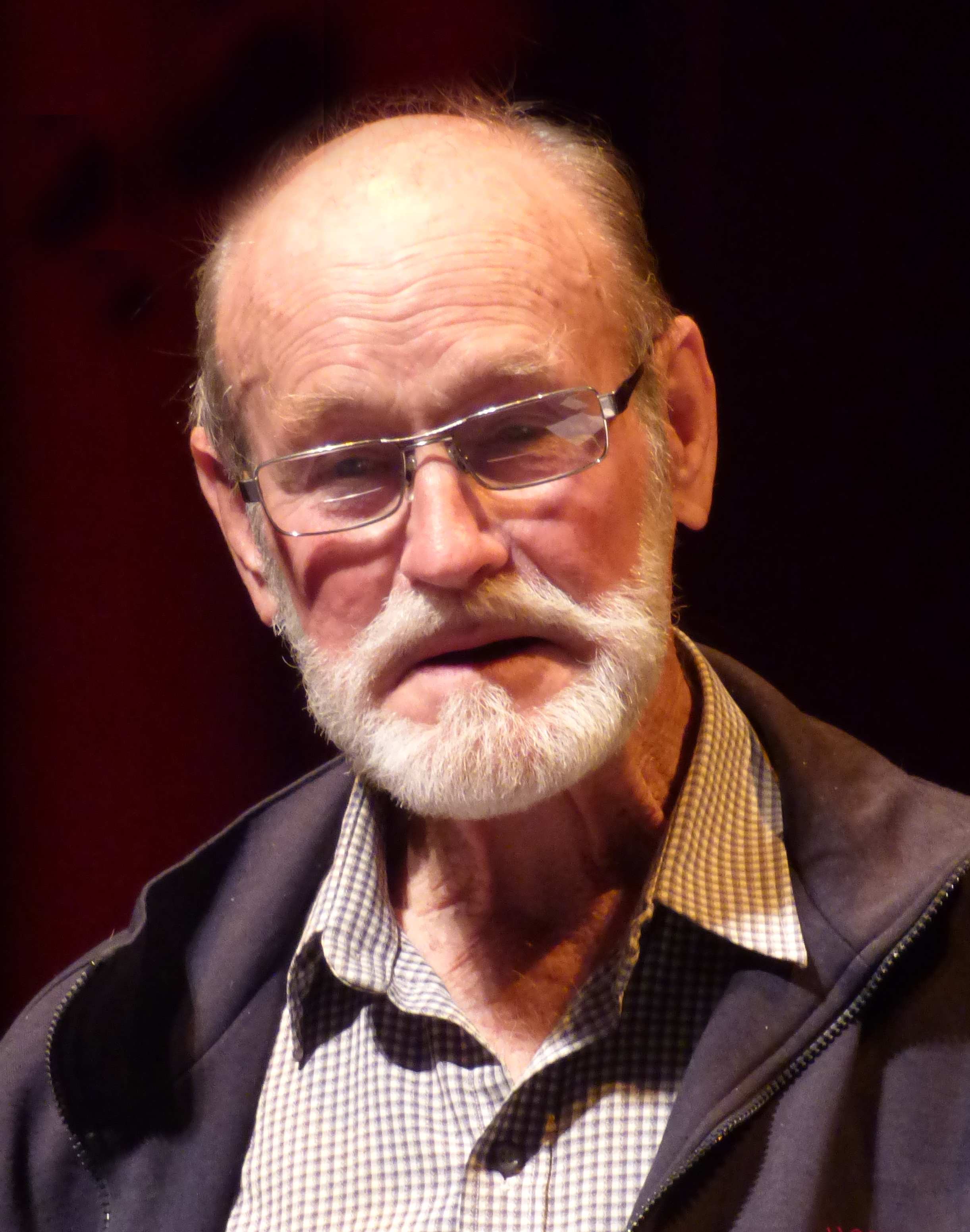
Avon Hudson (2016)

Avon Hudson (born 1937) is a South Australian RAAF ex-serviceman, nuclear weapons testing whistle-blower and co-author of the 2005 book Beyond Belief which he wrote with academic and historian, Roger Cross. He has appeared in several documentary films about nuclear weapons testing in Australia.

== Career ==
Hudson was educated at Whitwarta in South Australia. He joined the Australian Air Force in February 1956 and served until February 1962 as a mechanic, machinery operator and driver. After six years with the RAAF, Hudson left the armed services and worked on the Snowy Mountains Project as a mechanic before working on the civil space program in Australia.

He worked at the Weapons Research Establishment at Salisbury, South Australia as a driver and operator, then at the Woomera Rocket Range from April 1962 until March 1964 as a driver and operator. His next job was at the Tidbinbilla Deep Space Tracking Station DSIF Deep Space Instrumentation Facility where he worked as a crane operator and maintenance technician from April 1964 to 1970. He continued to work in the space industry at Orroral Valley Tracking Station (1965–1970), Honeysuckle Creek Tracking Station (1966) and Island Lagoon Tracking Station (1964–1970).

He worked on the Bougainville Island copper project from 1970 to 1971 and Sensus Building Canberra in crane maintenance from 1971 to December 1975. In 1975, he became a self-employed wood turner and antique dealer and restorer, eventually retiring in 2004.

Avon Hudson also served as an elected member of the Wakefield Regional Council for many years. During his time as a councillor, Hudson formally established the region, which includes his hometown of Balaklava, as a "nuclear free zone"; consistent with his work as an anti-nuclear activist and educator.

== Anti-nuclear activist ==
While a member of the Royal Australian Air Force, Hudson was assigned to work at the Maralinga testing range during the period of minor trials which included the explosive scattering of plutonium. At risk of incarceration for exposing Commonwealth secrets, Hudson later disclosed undertakings of the British nuclear weapons testing period in South Australia (1956–1963) making multiple appearances in mainstream media from the 1970s through 2010s. His disclosures delayed the return of the testing range to their traditional custodians, the Anangu people due to the inadequacy of clean-up measures, persistent contamination and associated health risks of ionizing radiation. He gave testimony to the Royal Commission into British nuclear testing in Australia in 1984 and 1985 and has continued to work as a spokesperson for nuclear veterans in South Australia since that time. Avon is an anti-nuclear activist and educator committed to explaining radiological hazards in accessible English – knowledge he has acquired over many decades of private study.

== Portrait of a Whistleblower exhibition 2015 ==
Avon Hudson's life was the subject of a public exhibition in February 2015, as part of the Adelaide Fringe Festival in Balaklava, South Australia. The exhibition Portrait of a Whistle-blower presented artifacts and images which trace his journey from childhood through his RAAF service and his subsequent life as a nuclear whistle-blower. The exhibition was curated by photo-media artist Jessie Boylan, who also contributed images to the exhibition including reproductions of artifacts and portraiture of Hudson. The artifacts on display included photographs from Hudson's own collection, a piece of vitrified earth from Maralinga, a red umbrella Hudson once used to evade an undercover government agent who was following him, and two cathode-ray tube televisions displaying TV news broadcasts and documentary film footage.

The exhibition was launched as part of an expanded event called 10 Minutes to Midnight, presented by Alphaville and Nuclear Futures. The event combined history, art and discussion and was supported by the Australia Council for the Arts and Arts SA. It featured three stages, including a projected video installation which created an impression of the nuclear test program and its effects and an open discussion with Boylan and Hudson. The event attracted a public audience which included nuclear veterans and their relatives who were able to share their experiences and ask questions. Additional contributing artists included Teresa Crea, Linda Dement, John Romeril, Nic Mollison and Luke Harrald.

== Documentary films ==
In 2020, Hudson was the lead subject in a short documentary film called Accounts of a Nuclear Whistleblower. He also appeared in Maralinga Pieces (2012), Maralinga Atomic Bomb Test Survivors (2007), Silent Storm (2003) and earlier titles.

== Political views ==
Hudson is a left wing social democrat and Labor supporter.

== See also ==
- Anti-nuclear movement in Australia
- Gavin Mudd
- Jim Falk
- Mark Diesendorf
- Dave Sweeney
- Alan Parkinson (engineer)
- Hedley Marston
- British nuclear tests at Maralinga
