= Jim Green (activist) =

Australian environmentalist

- Green in 2026
- Education: University of Wollongong
- Occupations: Environmental campaigner; writer; media commentator
- Organisation: Friends of the Earth Australia
- Known for: Anti-nuclear activism

Jim Green is an anti-nuclear campaigner with Friends of the Earth Australia, and a regular media commentator on nuclear issues.

== Early life and education ==
Jim Green has an honours degree in public health from the University of Wollongong and was awarded a PhD in science and technology studies for his analysis of the Lucas Heights research reactor debates, titled "Reactors, Radioisotopes & the HIFAR Controversy".

== Issues ==
Green campaigns against the use of nuclear technology in Australia, and as of June 2026 is national nuclear campaigner for Friends of the Earth Australia. Green, along with nuclear radiologist Peter Karamoskos, say there is growing scientific confidence in the linear no-threshold model for ionising radiation.

Green has been a regular media commentator on nuclear issues, and wrote numerous articles for Green Left between 2005 and 2009.

== See also ==
- Anti-nuclear movement in Australia
- Gavin Mudd
- Jim Falk
- Mark Diesendorf
- David Noonan (environmentalist)
- Dave Sweeney
