= Dave Sweeney =

Australian anti-nuclear campaigner

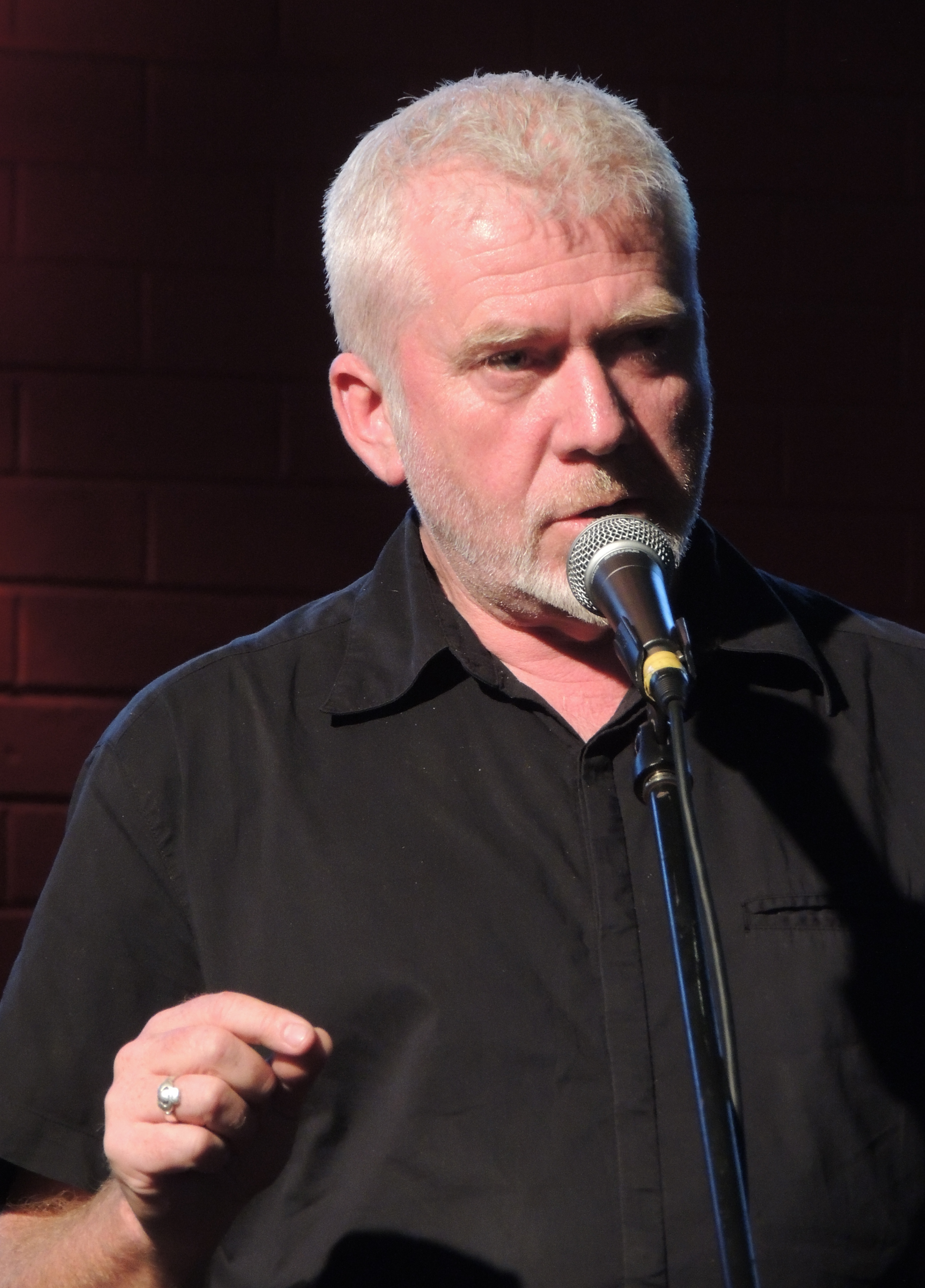
Dave Sweeney (2014)

David Sweeney is a prominent Australian anti-nuclear campaigner. He works for the Australian Conservation Foundation and acts an opinion writer and spokesperson on topics including uranium mining, nuclear waste, nuclear energy, nuclear weapons proliferation, nuclear accidents and related indigenous rights issues. Sweeney has made appearances in or contributed to several documentary films which include discussion of nuclear issues. He has been described by Matthew Stevens of the Australian Financial Review as "one of the nation's hardest working anti-nuke campaigners."

Dave was one of the founders of the International Campaign to Abolish Nuclear Weapons (ICAN), which won the Nobel Peace Prize in 2017.

== See also ==
- Anti-nuclear movement in Australia
- Gavin Mudd
- Jim Falk
- Mark Diesendorf
- Jim Green (activist)
- David Noonan (environmentalist)
