= Peter Rawlinson Award =

- Description: Outstanding voluntary contribution to the Australian environment
- Country: Australia
- Presented by: Australian Conservation Foundation (ACF)
- Rewards: $3,000 and a plaque

The Peter Rawlinson Award is an annual Australian environment award by the Australian Conservation Foundation consisting of $3000 and a plaque made to individuals who have made an outstanding voluntary contribution to the Australian environment. It commemorates Dr Peter Rawlinson's contribution as an environmental campaigner and researcher. Rawlinson was an ACF Treasurer and Vice President and a biologist and conservationist who died while doing field work in Indonesia in 1991.

== Prize winners ==
=== 2023 award ===
Won by the Barngarla Determination Aboriginal Corporation (BDAC), for their campaign against the construction of a radioactive waste facility near Kimba.

=== 2020 award ===
Won by Shirley Wonyabong, Elizabeth Wonyabong and Vicki Abdullah, Tjiwarl women who campaigned against the construction of a uranium mine in Yeelirrie.

=== 2015 award ===
Won by Jack Wongili Green, for his activism against McArthur River zinc mine.

=== 2013 award ===
Won by Glen Beutel, for his advocacy to prevent the development of coal mine in Acland, Queensland as the last landowner left in the ghost town.

=== 2011 award ===
Won by two organizations, Fraser Island Defenders Organization and Bundy on Tap. The first for its efforts in protecting Fraser Island over four decades including preventing logging and having it added to the World Heritage Site inventory. Bundy on Tap was awarded for its work on the ban of sale of plastic water bottles in Bundanoon, New South Wales.

=== 2010 award ===
Won by the organization, Rising Tide for bringing public attention to the climate crisis after high-profile actions through activism.

=== 2008 award ===
Won by Stephen Leonard, an environmental lawyer whose work focuses on litigating climate justice and environmental law reform.

=== 2007 award ===
Won by Aboriginal activist and elder of the Arabunna nation, Kevin Buzzacott for two decades of work highlighting the impacts of uranium mining and promoting a nuclear free Australia.

=== 2006 award ===
Won by Clive Crouch, a grassroots environmentalist from Nhill in Victoria, for his work promoting biodiversity in Victoria's Wimmera region over the last 30 years.

=== 2005 award ===
Won by Louise Morris, who has spent a decade campaigning tirelessly against uranium mining and for forest protection in the South West of Western Australia to 2001, then in Tasmania. She is one of the Gunns 20 activists being sued by wood chipping and timber company Gunns Limited.

=== 2003 award ===
Won by Nina Brown, known locally in Coober Pedy as Greenie Mula, an Irati Wanti campaign co-ordinator for the Kupa Piti Kungka Tjuta and giving them media and communications assistance to help defeat a nuclear waste dump proposal in South Australia.

=== 2001 award ===
Won by Dailan Pugh and John Corkill for their contribution to the North East Forest Alliance of New South Wales.

== See also ==
- List of environmental awards
