= Conservation Council of South Australia =

Australian environmental organisation

- Abbreviation: CCSA
- Type: Non-governmental organization (NGO)
- Purpose: Environmental protection, conservation advocacy, sustainability, climate change action
- Headquarters: Adelaide Stock Exchange, Adelaide, South Australia
- Location: South Australia
- Region served: Australia
- President: David Bacon
- Chief Executive: Kirsty Bevan
- Website: www.conservationsa.org.au/

The Conservation Council of South Australia, also known as Conservation SA and Conservation Council SA, is an environmental organisation serving as a peak body, representing over 50 member groups, representing over 90,000 individual members, in the state of South Australia.

== Description ==
The Council is an independent, non-profit and strictly non-party political organisation, established to "give a voice to the growing environmental challenges that face us and the emerging solutions showing the way to the future". It informs the public and government on key environmental issues and participates in government and community processes that seek to restore and protect the natural environment. The Council liaises with industry, government departments, unions, community organisations and all political parties. By nominating individuals to sit on government committees such as the EPA Board, the Pastoral Board, and the Lake Eyre Basin Community Advisory Committee, the Council provides the community with opportunities for direct input into government decision-making.

As of 2021, there were 50 member groups. Combined, these groups represent over 90,000 South Australians with the common goals being the conservation and protection of the environment and a sustainable future.

== Awards ==
Since 1998, the SA Environment Awards have been presented annually on World Environment Day on 5 June by Conservation Council SA. As of 2024, the awards are presented in partnership with Green Adelaide, Department for Environment and Water, and University of Adelaide Environment Institute). The awards include the Jill Hudson Award for Environmental Protection; Green Adelaide's Pelzer Prize; Leif Justham Young Achievers Award; Innovation Award; Working Together Award; and the Conservation Science Prize. Since 2017, outstanding "activists, community organisers, and conservationists" have been inducted into the SA Environment Hall of Fame.

=== Jill Hudson Award ===
The Conservation Council of South Australia presents the Jill Hudson Award for Environmental Protection annually.

Past recipients have included Jillian Marsh (1998) David Noonan, Joel Catchlove & Sophie Green, Richard Owen, the Kupa Piti Kunga Tjuta Aboriginal Corporation, Kevin Buzzacott, Anne Daw (2013) and Mark Parnell (2004).

== The Joinery ==
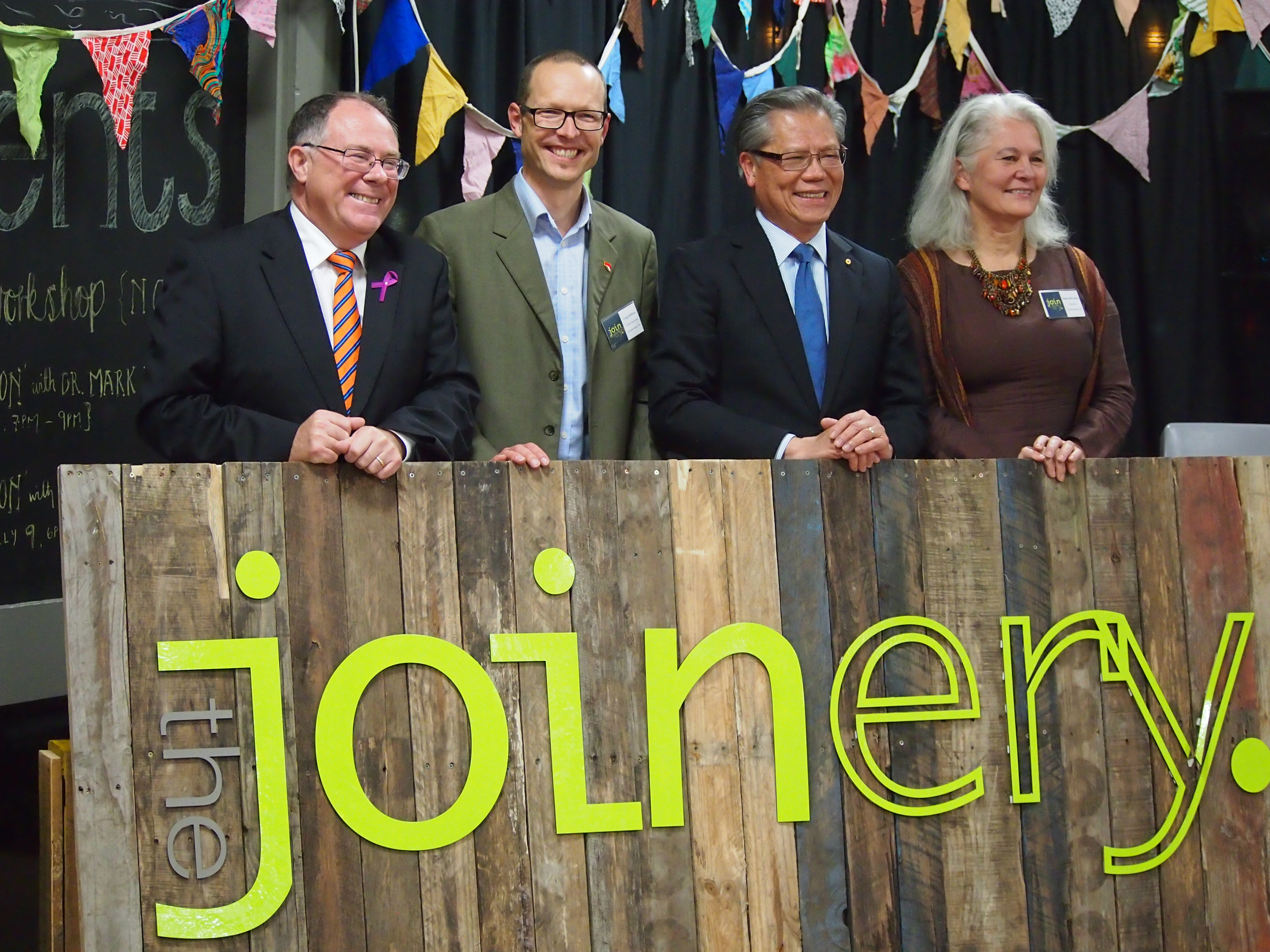
Opening The Joinery 4 June 2015. (l-r) SA Environment Minister the Hon. Ian Hunter MLC; CCSA CEO Craig Wilkinson; Governor of SA, the Hon. Hieu Van Le, AO: CCSA President Nadia McLaren.

In early 2015 Conservation SA moved its headquarters to the disused former interstate bus terminal building in Franklin Street, owned by the Adelaide City Council, creating a community environment space called The Joinery. The building houses offices sublet to other environmental and sustainability related organisations, groups and businesses, and a former carpark area has been converted to a community garden shared with the community housing group Common Ground.

== Member groups ==
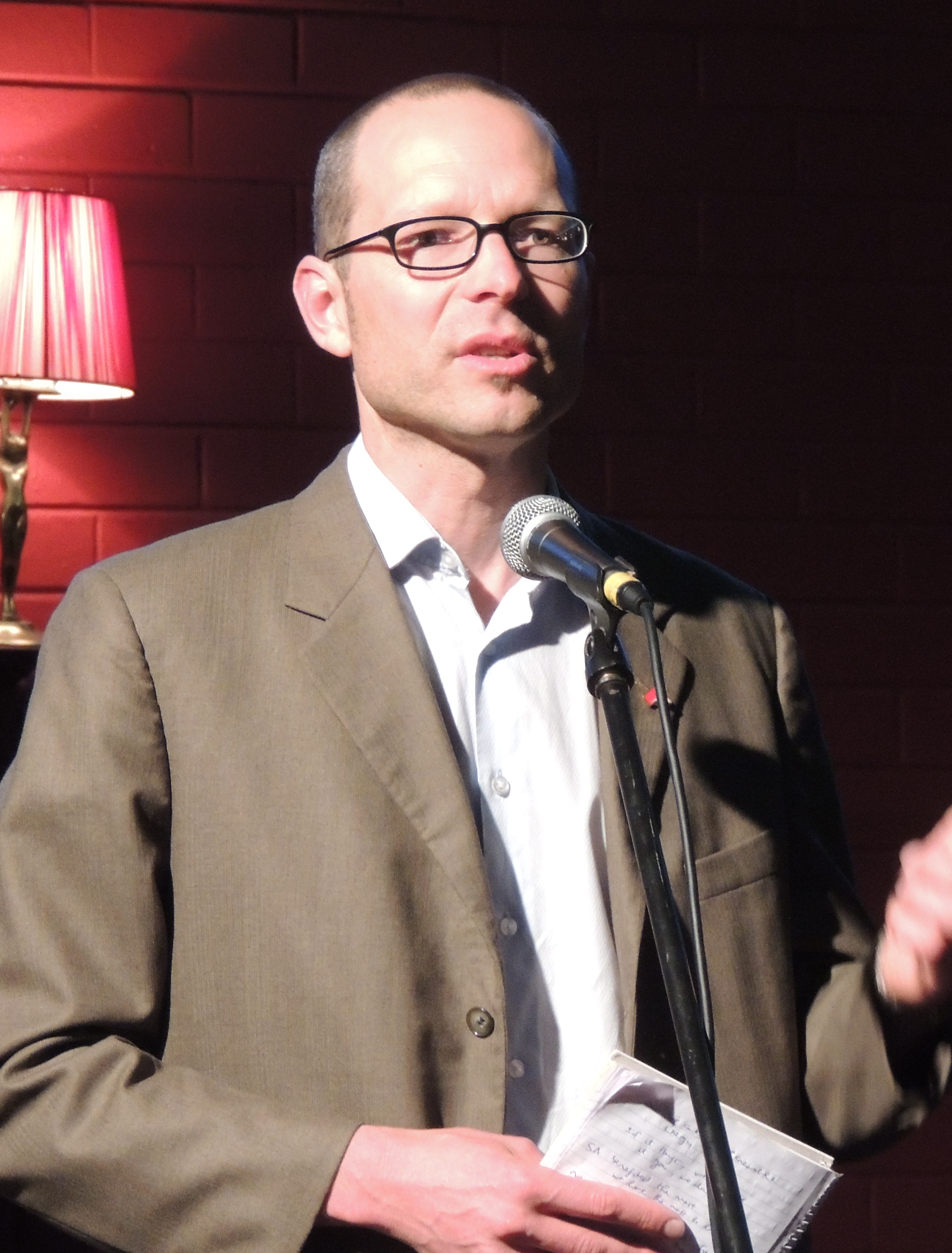
Craig Wilkins, Chief Executive CCSA (2014)

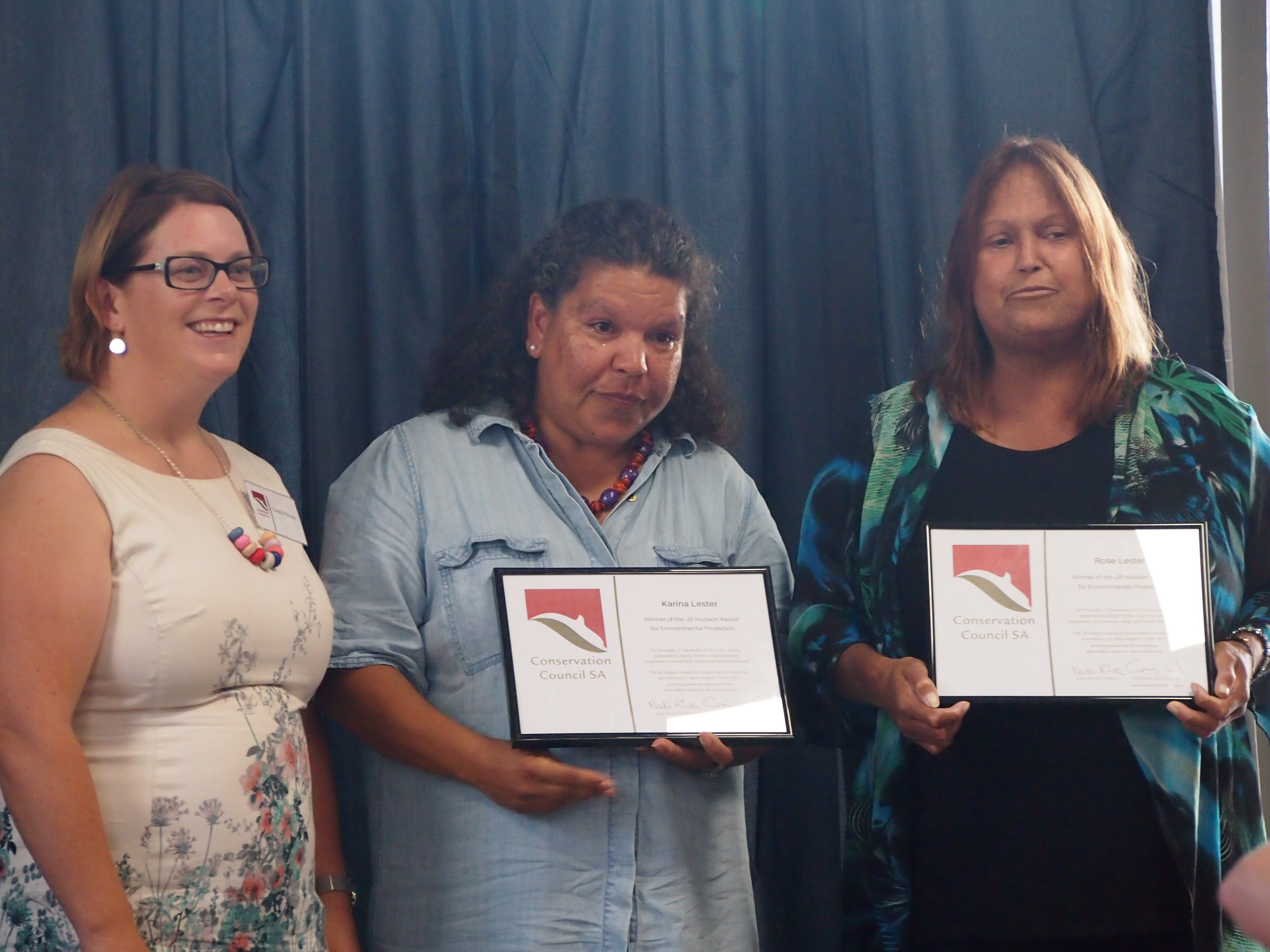
DEWNR CEO Sandy Pitcher presenting the CCSA's 2015 Jill Hudson Award to sisters Karina and Rose Lester for their work in advocating on behalf of aboriginal communities in relation to the SA Royal Commission into the Nuclear Fuel Cycle, 17 December 2015.

As of 2021, there are over 50 member groups represented on the Council:

- Aldgate Valley Landcare Group Inc
- Aldinga Bay Coastcare Inc
- Anti Nuclear Coalition
- Australian Association for Environmental Education SA
- Australian Conservation Foundation
- Australian Electric Vehicle Association
- Australian Institute of Landscape Architects (SA Group)
- Australian Nuclear Free Alliance
- Australian Plants Society (SA Region) Inc
- Australian Youth Climate Coalition SA
- Bike Adelaide
- Birds SA
- Brownhill Creek Association Inc
- CEDAMIA (Climate Emergency Declaration and Mobilisation in Action)
- Cheltenham Park Residents Association Inc
- Citizens Own Renewable Energy Network Australia
- Clean Bight Alliance Australia
- Community Alliance SA Inc
- Eco-Action KI
- Economic Reform Australia Inc
- Extinction Rebellion SA
- Field Naturalists Society of SA
- Fishers for Conservation
- Fossil Free SA
- Friends of Gulf St Vincent
- Friends of Parks
- Friends of the Earth Adelaide Inc
- Friends of Willunga Basin
- Gawler Environment & Heritage Association Inc
- Greening Australia (SA)
- Landcare Association of SA Inc
- Landscape Partnerships Inc
- Limestone Coast Protection Alliance
- National Trust of South Australia
- Nature Conservation Society of SA
- North East Hills Environmental Conservation Association
- Nuclear Operations Watch Port Adelaide
- Orienteering SA Inc
- Outdoors SA
- People for Public Transport
- Permaculture Association of SA Inc
- Port Adelaide Residents Environment Protection Group
- Rise Up Singing
- River, Lakes & Coorong Action Group Inc
- SA Genetic Food Information Network Inc
- SA Herpetology Group Inc
- Scientific Expedition Group Inc
- St Agnes Bushwalking & Natural History Club Inc
- Sustainable Communities SA Inc
- Sustainable Population Australia SA Branch
- Tennyson Dunes Group
- Toyota Landcruiser Club of Australia (SA)
- The Wilderness Society (South Australia) Inc
- Trees For Life
- Vegetarian & Vegan Society (VegSA) Inc
- Walking SA
- West Mallee Protection Group
- Western Adelaide Coastal Residents’ Association
- Wombats SA
- Zoos SA

== See also ==
- Conservation Council of Western Australia
- Environment Victoria
- Queensland Conservation Council
