= David Noonan (environmentalist) =

Australian environmentalist

- Noonan in 2026
- Occupation: Environmental campaigner
- Employer: Australian Conservation Foundation (1996–2011)
- Known for: Anti-nuclear activism

David Noonan is an Australian environmentalist and member of the anti-nuclear movement in Australia. Noonan is a former anti-nuclear campaigner for the Australian Conservation Foundation, and has been a prominent spokesperson during campaigns against the expansion of uranium mining in Australia and against the establishment of nuclear waste storage facilities. He has a science degree and a Masters in Environmental Studies.

== Advocacy ==
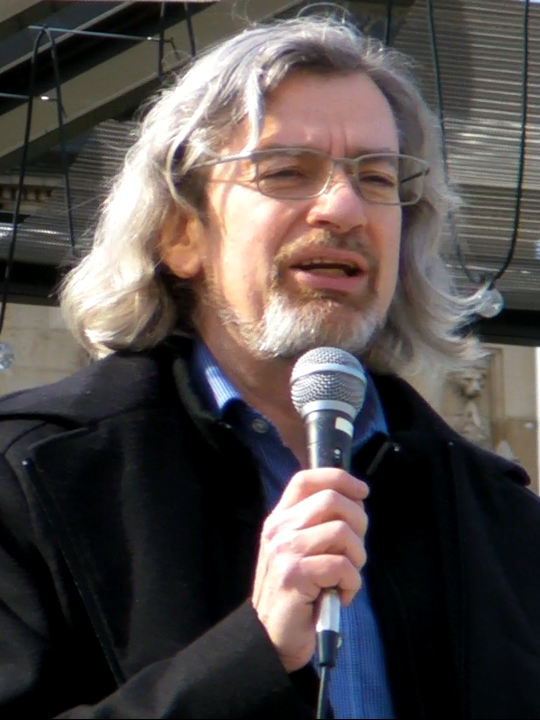
David Noonan speaks in Adelaide, 2014

Noonan has been a regular media spokesperson and opinion-writer representing the case against the establishment of nuclear power in Australia and Australia's participation in the global nuclear industrial fuel cycle. Noonan has also advocated for investment in renewable energy and energy efficiency as alternatives to nuclear energy.

In the 1990s, Noonan spoke against the development of Jabiluka and Beverley uranium mines. With respect to the Beverley mine's in-situ leaching process, he drew attention to the absence of any requirement for the mine's operators to re-mediate impacted groundwater.

Noonan has provided evidence to Parliamentary inquiries into nuclear issues at state and federal levels. In 2002 he provided evidence to a Parliamentary standing committee on nuclear safeguards. The following year, he provided witness testimony to a parliamentary inquiry into nuclear waste transport and disposal in New South Wales.

Following the South Australian government's successful appeal against a decision by the Howard government to establish a nuclear waste dump in South Australia, Noonan told the media:

"The court has shown here today that the federal government exceeded their powers in trying to override the will of the South Australian community and the will of the SA parliament... They have failed in the land acquisition for this nuclear waste dump and they will not get away with imposing a nuclear waste future against SA's interests."

Noonan went on to win the Conservation Council of South Australia's Jill Hudson Award for Environmental Protection to acknowledge his campaigning work opposing the waste dump development.

In 2005 he referred to former Australian Prime Minister Bob Hawke's advocacy to end the Labor Party's three mine policy on uranium mining and to establish a nuclear waste repository in Australia as "undemocratic and dangerous." In the same year, he argued that to replace coal with nuclear power generation in the name of fighting climate change, was simply replacing a hazardous process (burning coal) with a hazardous technology (nuclear power).

Noonan has advocated against the export of Australian uranium to Russia and China as he considers both nations to be in non-compliance with their Nuclear Non-Proliferation Treaty obligations.

In the wake of the Fukushima nuclear disaster, Noonan drew attention to export sales of Australian uranium to Japan made by BHP and Rio Tinto, and warned Australia to "steer clear of the risks of nuclear energy."

Noonan's advocacy efforts attracted criticism from pro-nuclear environmentalist Ben Heard, who described him as having an "ultra-combatative demeanor" and "rusted on politics" in 2011.

He has spoken out against various aspects of the Olympic Dam copper and uranium mine and its planned open cut expansion, including the management of its radioactive mine tailings and its water and energy requirements. He is opposed to the establishment of a new seawater desalination plant at Point Lowly, where the brine discharge could threaten the breeding grounds of the giant Australian cuttlefish.

Noonan has also spoken publicly on nuclear issues in academic debates, at public forums, conferences, demonstrations and community events.

== See also ==
- Dave Sweeney
- Jim Green (activist)
- Avon Hudson
- Mark Diesendorf

== Links ==
- Transcript: Eric Miller interviews David Noonan from ACF Adelaide about the Laffery report on the Beverley uranium pilot plant.
