= Jack Green (artist) =

Garrwa artist and environment activist

Jack Green (born 1953) is an Garrwa artist and environment activist from the Northern Territory of Australia. He uses his art to campaign for land rights and the protection of his traditional Country and region, particularly against the adverse impacts of mining.

Green is a Mambaliya man. His father was Garrwa and his mother was Marra. Born under a coolabah tree on Soudan Station in 1953 on the Barkly Tablelands, he has lived in Borroloola since the 1970s.

He has worked as the Mabunji Indigenous Corporation and Northern Land Council.

Green ran for Northern Territory Parliament in the Barkly electorate in 2016 as an independent, receiving 11.4% of the vote.

Green paints at Waralungku Arts and is particularly focused on depicting the impacts of Glencore's McArthur river mine, one of the world's biggest open cut lead, zinc, and silver mines, on the Garrwa, Gudanji and Marra owners. In 2023, he joined other Traditional Owners and local environment groups to lodge a legal challenge over the reduction of the mine's rehabilitation bond.

He had his first solo exhibition in 2013 and work is now held in private and public collections. He recently contributed to Lead in my grandmother’s body that examined the history of colonial violence around Borroloola.

In 2020, Green submitted a series of paintings to the parliamentary inquiry into the destruction of Juukan Gorge, which is estimated to be at least 46,000-years old. They were exhibited at the Museum of Australian Democracy at Old Parliament House.

== Awards ==
Green received the national Peter Rawlinson Award for outstanding achievement in caring for the environment in 2015.

He was a finalist for the National Aboriginal & Torres Strait Islander Art Award in 2016 and 2022.

He also received a lifetime achievement award at the 2020 TNRM Conference.
