= Nulyarimma v Thompson =

1999 decision of the Federal Court of Australia

- Court: Federal Court of Australia
- Full case name: Wadjularbinna Nulyarimma & Ors v Phillip Thompson; Buzzacott & Ors v Minister for the Environment
- Decided: 2 September 1999
- Citation: (1999) 96 FCR 153; (1999) 165 ALR 621; [1999] FCA 1192

Case history
- Prior actions: Buzzacott v Hill [1999] FCA 639 and Re Thompson; ex parte Nulyarimma (1999) 136 ACTR 9
- Subsequent action: none

Court membership
- Judges sitting: Wilcox, Whitlam and Merkel JJ

Case opinions
- (2:1) genocide is not incorporated into the Australian common law (per Wilcox and Whitlam JJ)

Nulyarimma v Thompson was an Australian court case decided by the Federal Court of Australia. Two separate cases, Nulyarimma v Thompson and Buzzacott v Minister for the Environment were heard in conjunction. In both cases, members of the Aboriginal community alleged that certain members of the Australian Parliament and government ministers had committed genocide. The case was decided in favour of the Government.

== Background to the case ==
=== Nulyarimma v Thompson ===
In 1997, the Howard government proposed a “ten point plan” to reform the operation of native title in Australia. The plan eventually became the Native Title Amendment 1998. The appellants claimed that the consequences of the “ten point plan” amounted to genocide as it severely restricted and disadvantaged Indigenous Australians' land ownership, livelihood and mental health.

=== Buzzacott v Minister for the Environment ===
In April 1999, the Minister for Foreign Affairs, Alexander Downer, and the Minister for the Environment, Robert Hill, formally refused to pursue the World Heritage listing of Lake Eyre, instead allowing a mining company, BHP Billiton to commence mining operations. The appellant, Kevin Buzzacott, claimed that Downer's failure to pursue World Heritage listing amounted to genocide against his people.

== Arguments ==
Julian Burnside QC and five Senathiraja argued for the appellants that genocide is a part of customary international law, and that even without legislation criminalising genocide within Australia, Australian courts can try individuals accused of genocide. The “ten point plan” constituted genocide because it was a deliberate attempt to destroy the Aboriginal race. The appellants, particularly Ms Nulyarimma, gave evidence to the Court of attempted genocide. Further, Burnside argued that the respondent's failure to pursue the World Heritage listing of Lake Eyre amounted to genocide as BHP Billiton's mining operations threatened the flora, fauna and livelihood of his people by allegedly draining the lake.

H Burmester QC, M Perry and R Bayliss argued on behalf of the respondents that customary international law did not form a part of Australian domestic law and therefore no Australian court has jurisdiction to try individuals for genocide.

== Judgment ==
Whitlam and Wilcox JJ ruled that customary international law did not form a part of Australian law and therefore genocide was not a crime under Australian law in the absence of legislation declaring genocide a crime. Merkel J dissented, finding that customary international law was incorporated into Australian law because of its status as jus cogens, but ultimately found that, because the respondents had no intent to commit genocide, the appellants' claim failed.

== Aftermath ==
In response to Nulyarimma v Thompson, Parliament moved to criminalise genocide by legislation. The Anti-Genocide Bill was a private members bill introduced by the Australian Democrats. In his second reading speech, Senator Brian Greig drew to the attention of parliament the gaps in Australia's criminal law and the need to pass legislation to implement the United Nations Convention on the Prevention and Punishment of the Crime of Genocide which Australia ratified in 1949.

The bill was referred by the Senate to the Senate Legal and Constitutional Reference Committee on 14 October 1999. It was eventually scrapped in favour of the International Criminal Court Bill which adopted the United Nations Rome Statute of the International Criminal Court. In 2002, the International Criminal Court Act 2002 was passed, declaring genocide a crime.
