= Eileen Wani Wingfield =

Australian activist

- Organization: Kupa Piti Kungka Tjuta
- Awards: Goldman Environmental Prize (2003)

Eileen Wani Wingfield is an Aboriginal elder from Australia. She was jointly awarded the Goldman Environmental Prize in 2003 with Eileen Kampakuta Brown, for efforts to stop the plans for nuclear waste dump in Australia's wild desert land, and for protection of their land and culture.

Wingfield (with other elder women) formed the Kupa Piti Kungka Tjuta, Coober Pedy Women's Council, in 1995.

== Early life ==
As a young woman Eileen Wani Wingfield mustered cattle and sheep with her father and sister. During this time she had to hide from the authorities, who were removing biracial children from their families and sending them to institutions to be trained for a life of servitude. She married and had her own children, but they were found and taken by the authorities.

== Protest against nuclear tests ==
In the 1950s and 1960s, a dozen full-scale nuclear tests were conducted in the southern Australian deserts by the British military. The Aboriginal inhabitants were told nothing of these tests in the aftermath of which many old people died prematurely, many people went blind, suffered radiation sickness or developed cancer. It was not until decades later that the true cause of the illnesses was understood.

In the early 1990s the Australian government suggested building a radioactive waste dump near Woomera in South Australia, to store waste from the Lucas Heights nuclear reactor in Sydney and from nuclear facilities around the world. Aboriginal communities feared further poisoning of their land, water and health. When she moved to Cooper Pedy, Eileen Wani Wingfield joined Eileen Kampakuta Brown in the Kupa Piti Kungka Tjuta or the Cooper Pedy Women's Council, with five other senior women. Eileen Wani Wingfield was honored along with Eileen Kampakuta Brown for her efforts in April, 2003.

== Mission ==
They travel round Australia speaking against the project and working at keeping their culture alive. The group's declaration of opposition makes the following comments: 'It's from our grandmothers and our grandfathers that we've learned about the land. This learning isn't written on paper as the whitefellas knowledge is. We carry it in our heads and we're talking from our hearts, for the land.'

In 2000 she and Eileen Kampakuta Brown published Down the Hole, a children's book based on their own childhood experiences of hiding from the authorities.
