= Nancy Shelley =

Nancy Jean Shelley (1926–2010) OAM was a Quaker peace activist who represented the Australian peace movement at the United Nations in 1982. She was a prominent speaker at many Australian and international conferences in the 1980s and 1990s. Shelley received a Medal of the Order of Australia (OAM) in 1989 for her work. She died on 28 September 2010.

== See also ==
- List of peace activists
