= Anne Daw =

Anne Daw is a South Australian environmental activist who advocates for the protection of water resources and prime agricultural land from mining and petroleum activities.

== Activism ==
Daw advocates for the protection of water resources and prime agricultural land from mining and petroleum activities, including exploration and production.

== Roles and activities ==
Daw has been a member of the Government of South Australia's Roundtable for Oil and Gas, previously known as the Round Table for the Roadmap for Unconventional Gas Projects in South Australia, since 2012. In 2012, when she became a member of the Round Table for the Roadmap for Unconventional Gas Projects in South Australia, she learnt of the gas plans across the state and in the South East of South Australia.

She has also held a seat at a Round Table for Health and Energy Policy in Canberra in 2013.

She was invited to be a speaker at the Murray Darling Association National Conference in Goolwa, SA in 2013.

== Recognition ==
Daw was a recipient of the Conservation Council of South Australia's Jill Hudson Award for Environmental Protection in 2013.
