= Campaign Against Nuclear Energy =

The Campaign Against Nuclear Energy (CANE) was established in Perth, Western Australia on 14 February 1976 by Friends of the Earth (FOE). It included Peter Brotherton, John Carlin, Mike Lawson and Barrie Machin. CANE was a non-profit grass roots organisation whose aim was to stop the establishment of a nuclear power plant in Western Australia (WA) and to halt uranium mining. The organisation operated out of the Environment Centre in Wellington Street, Perth. The Whitlam Federal government in 1974 had dedicated about A$7,000 per state to set up Regional Environment Centres. Perth's Environment Centre housed other groups including the Australian Conservation Foundation the Conservation Council of Western Australia, Friends of the Earth, and the Campaign to Save Native Forests. A CANE group was also established in Adelaide, South Australia.

== Aims ==
CANE's statement of objectives stated:

It opposed the development of Nuclear Power Stations.

It supported the Nuclear Non-Proliferation Treaty (NPT or NNPT) and opposed the proliferation and acquisition of Weapons of Mass destruction and linked WMD with nuclear power stations.

It opposed foreign policies based on nuclear deterrence. It supported attempts to establish regional nuclear-free zones. It was opposed to the use of Australian ports by nuclear-powered or nuclear-armed vessels.

CANE was opposed to the mining and export of Australian uranium for other than biomedical purposes. It asked for the cessation of all uranium mining and development operations. It urged the adoption of long-range alternative energy policies designed to meet the legitimate needs of future generations.

It emphasised that it was a coalition of groups and individuals working for the ideal of a more ethical and equitable energy future.

== Campaign activities ==
1976 was CANE's initial year of protest. There were demonstrations at the Perth Airport and Rockingham against US nuclear armed carriers headed by Barrie Machin, a lecturer at the University of Western Australia (UWA). CANE, under Machin's leadership, was very active in its criticism of the Fox Report 1977. It was also the first anti-nuclear organisation to draw attention to Aboriginal Land Rights and uranium mining. Gloria Brennan, who was the first aboriginal student at the Department of Social Anthropology at UWA, was invited to join CANE and lobby and inform aboriginal communities in WA. She did this very successfully. Gloria later died of cancer, probably brought about from the fall-out from the Maralinga tests.

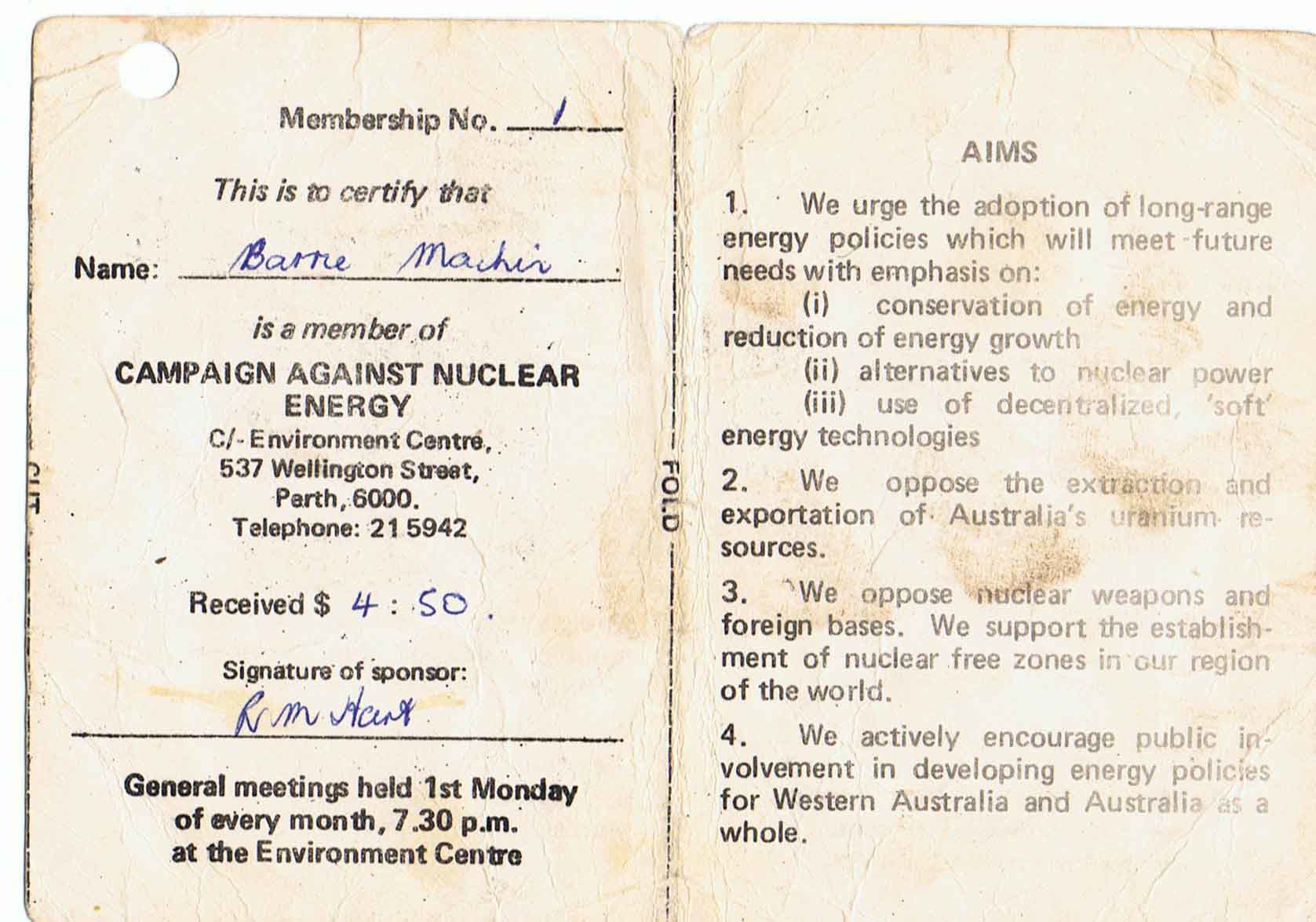
Original membership CANE

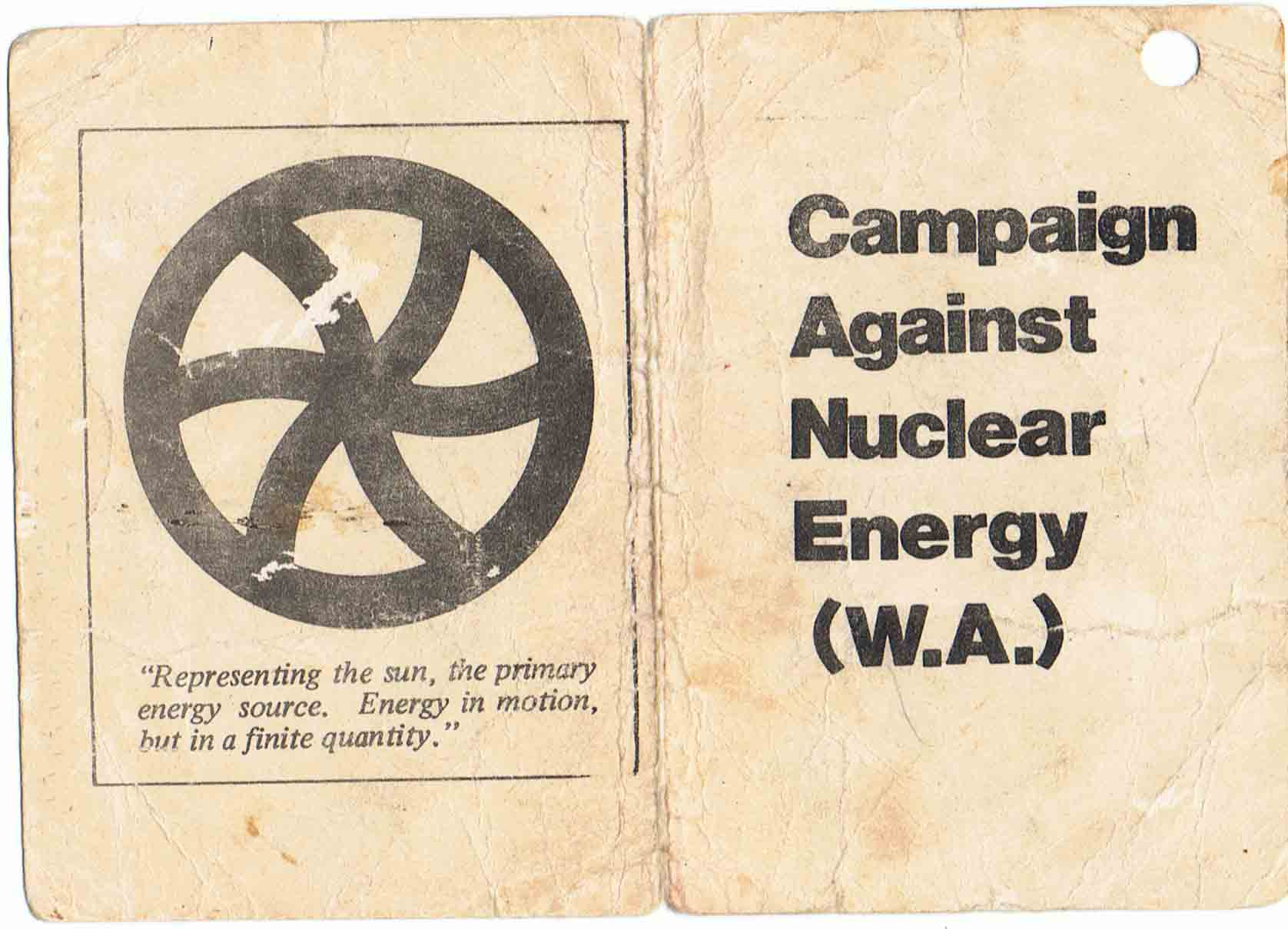
Original membership CANE

CANE decided to hold major demonstrations in 1977. It set no goals about numbers since this obviously could not be predicted. Newspapers varied in their estimates of the crowds. At the first rally in April, supporters marched from the Esplanade to the Parliament House and the attendance was estimated at 600. The second rally, on Hiroshima Day, attracted 3000 people and in November, 10,000 people marched, larger than the anti-Vietnam rallies in Perth a few years earlier.

Barrie Machin, as coordinator, first drew attention to the dangers of nuclear power stations as target for terrorists, and the dangers of a link with the foreign policies of the US in a pamphlet titled: Accomplices to Armageddon. In 1977, Barrie Machin represented CANE on the WA steering committee for the Australian Democrats, which was stimulated by Don Chipp largely in response to the issue of uranium mining. Also on the committee was Jack Evans who later became a Senator for the Democrats.

I have been grossly disappointed with the attitude of the government on uranium mining. ... The last straw on this issue was the action of the Deputy Prime Minister (Mr.Anthony) in launching a pro-uranium book simultaneously with a statement by the Ambassador of Japan advocating the mining of Australian uranium. The breach of our promise to continue the Australian Assistance Plan; wage indexation; the value of the currency; the Social Welfare Commission; increased research on solar energy are matters which have disturbed me greatly.

In 1978, with considerable help from Gloria Brennan, Barrie Machin and other CANE members successfully lobbied the Labour Party's National conference. Their success was helped when Bob Hawke's son was manhandled by the police in Melbourne protesting against yellowcake. This was reported in all national newspapers at the time.

The Premier Sir Charles Court proposed on 15 June 1979 that Breton Bay, 90 km north of Perth, and Wilbinga, 70 km north of Perth as possible sites for a nuclear power station. On 4 July 1979 a Public Meeting was conducted jointly by CANE and FOE at the Perth Town Hall in response to the announcement. Three speakers (Peter Brotherton of FOE; Peter G. Cook of CANE and Peter F. Cook of the WA Trade and Labour Council) addressed the audience.

The Government responded by attacking CANE. The West Australian newspaper on 25 August 1979 reported: "The Premier, Sir Charles Court, last night warned of a subtle new propaganda offensive against democracy. He said that the susceptibility of democratic governments to electoral pressure was being exploited as never before… Locally, mysteriously financed pressure groups were trying to force governments into irrational decisions through high powered arousal of emotions based on false evidence. Sir Charles said: 'When you consider that governments make thousands of decisions a year on the basis of close-contact experience of what they are doing backed by outside top-level advice on critical matters, it is clearly against the public interest to exchange this process for one of street-march campaigns and loaded opinion polls.'"

Senator Ruth Coleman (Australian Labor Party) established another anti-nuclear group Women Against Uranium Mining and started collecting anti-nuclear information about nuclear accidents from every media source. She presented this list of accidents for public distribution, with relevant sources, to raise awareness among West Australians.

'Desperate Measures' was a group of street theatre activist actors based in Fremantle who wrote their own material. They provided social commentary at numerous anti-nuclear events that brought home the messages better than a speech. They presented a show for the finale of CANE's Wilbinga bike ride again the proposed nuclear power station and it including burying a papier mache nuclear reactor on the site.

Fundraising events included the CANE 'Concert-in-the-Sun' on 19 December 1981. The concert was organised by Peter Kaldor and featured local rock acts Dave Warner, Matt Taylor-Phil Manning Band (see Matt Taylor, Phil Taylor), the Essentials and the Eurogliders. The audience of around 3,500 people raised $8,000, enough to fund a substantial number of CANE activities throughout the following year.

CANE was a member of the Coalition for a Nuclear Free Australia (CNFA), a coalition from across Australia of 79 organisations, unions, anti-nuclear groups, environment centres and Friends of the Earth.

== End of campaigning ==
The West Australian reported on 7 April 1983 that the new Australian Labor Party State Government abandoned plans for a nuclear power station. The cabinet decided to stop all State Energy Commission inquires that could lead to a nuclear power station. Brian Burke said that the cabinet had reaffirmed that in no circumstances would a nuclear power station be built in WA.

== See also ==
- Anti-nuclear movement
- Anti-nuclear movement in Australia
- Australian Greens
- Uranium mining controversy in Kakadu National Park
