= Friends of the Earth Australia =

Australian climate change organisation

- Founded: 1974
- Purpose: Human rights and Environment
- Region served: Australia
- Volunteers: 4,000 (approximate)
- Website: foe.org.au

Friends of the Earth (FoE) Australia is a federation of independent local groups working for a socially equitable and environmentally sustainable future. It believes that pursuing environmental protection is inseparable from broader social concerns, and as a result uses an environmental justice perspective in its campaigning. It was founded in 1974 and is the Australian member of Friends of the Earth International.

== Campaign issues ==
Friends of the Earth considers environmental issues in their social, political and human rights contexts. Their campaigns stretch beyond the traditional arena of the conservation movement and seek to address the economic, social justice and development aspects of sustainability.

The current national campaigns and projects of FoEA are:

=== Climate justice ===
A climate justice perspective addresses global warming by looking at who is harmed by climatic change, and how, and who is responsible for the emissions that caused the warming. In practical terms this means FoEA campaigns for Australia to reduce its carbon emissions to a 'globally equitable' level whilst also agreeing to accept a quota of 'climate refugees'. In 2009 it launched the Coalition for Climate Displacement and also broadened its campaign work into state based activity against the expansion of coal mining and export.

The current main focus of its climate campaign is to oppose an expansion of Australia's reliance on coal and to promote a shift to low carbon sources of energy production.

=== Anti-nuclear ===
Since its inception, FoEA has campaigned against all aspects of the nuclear fuel cycle. The ACE Anti-Nuclear Collective is the longest continuous running campaign at FoEA, and has worked for over forty years researching, educating and actively campaigning on nuclear issues. At present this includes campaigning against the radioactive waste dump proposed for the South Australia and closure of all existing uranium mines, including the Olympic Dam mine at Roxby Downs in South Australia. The co-coordinator of its national nuclear campaign is Jim Green.

=== Nanotechnology ===
FoEA is calling for a moratorium on the research, development and production of synthetic nanoproducts while regulations are developed to protect the health and safety of workers, the public and the environment from the impacts of nanotechnology.

=== Chemicals ===
FoEA campaigns on a range of industrial chemicals issues, particularly the use of Bisphenol A in consumer products and use of pesticides in drinking water catchments.

=== Sustainable food ===
The FoEA Sustainable Food and Agriculture Project addresses issues of social justice and environmental sustainability in contemporary food and farming systems.

=== Indigenous land and rights ===
Many local FoE groups work in partnership with Indigenous communities. FoE acts as the secretariat for the Australian Nuclear Free Alliance (ANFA).

In addition to more conventional campaigning, a number of FoE groups operate businesses and other ventures that act as practical examples of sustainable business. In 1999 FoE Brisbane initiated the Reverse Garbage re-use centre, which finds community uses for industrial discards which would otherwise go to landfill. The Bicycle Revolution (which finds and fixes up old pushbikes) also operates from FoE Brisbane. FoE in Melbourne has been running a large food co-operative and a bookshop for over two decades and, more recently an organic café.

== Funding ==
The local groups generate their own funds. National campaigns and projects rely on individual donations, foundations, merchandise, and bequests. FoE Australia currently receives no government or corporate funding.

== Politics and criticisms ==
FoE Australia sits at the left end of the political spectrum. While it is a 'peak' green group, it is one of the smaller such groups. It tends to operate from a grassroots political structure, which means it places less emphasis on lobbying of, or engagement with, either the federal Australian government or large corporations than most other national green groups. It uses research, lobbying, media work, political advocacy and peaceful direct action to achieve its aims.

It is known for developing lasting connections with a range of indigenous communities and organisations over areas of shared interest.

It has been criticised for carrying out non-violent direct action by a range of conservative commentators (for instance, Andrew Bolt, columnist with the Herald Sun newspaper in Melbourne). Andrew Bolt has also accused them of being 'alarmist' on the question of climate change.

Some groups and people concerned about the impacts of population growth have been critical of FoE's focus on consumption and equity in regards to resource distribution and called on the organisation to campaign more directly for a reduction in human population.
