= Kevin Buzzacott =

Aboriginal Australian rights campaigner and elder

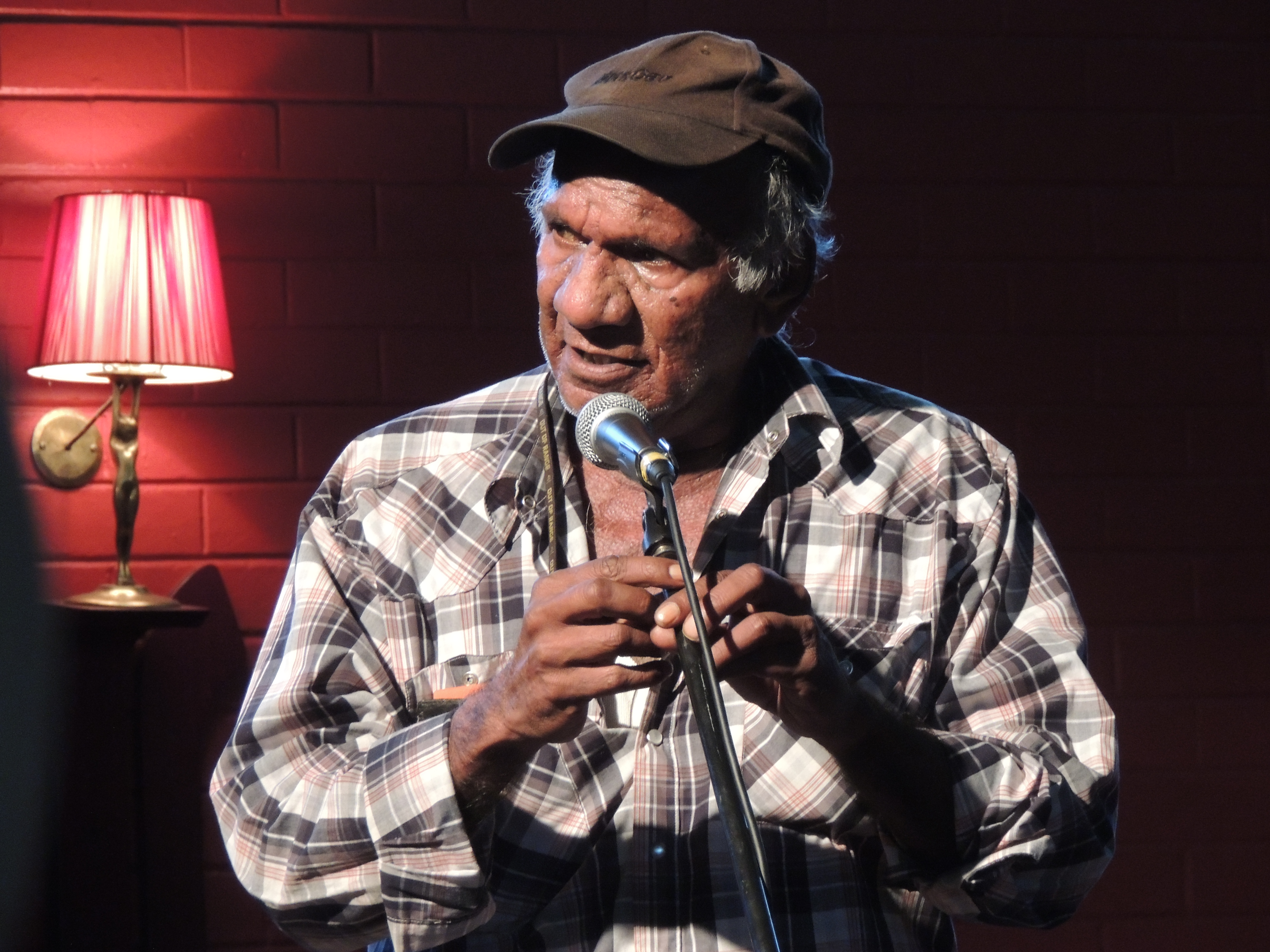
- Kevin Buzzacott in Adelaide in 2014
- Born: 1946; Finniss Springs
- Died: 29 November 2023 (aged 76–77)
- Other name: "Uncle Kev"
- Occupation: Aboriginal rights campaigner

Kevin Buzzacott (1946 – 29 November 2023), often referred to as Uncle Kev, was an Aboriginal Australian rights campaigner and elder of the Arabunna nation in northern South Australia. He campaigned widely for cultural recognition, justice, and land rights for Aboriginal people. He initiated and led numerous campaigns, including against uranium mining at Olympic Dam mine on Kokatha land and the exploitation of the water from the Great Artesian Basin. He also published a collections of poetry, which included the content of his keynote address at a 1998 conference.

== Early life and education ==
Kevin Buzzacott was born in 1946 at Finniss Springs, South Australia, on Arabunna country, and he was an Arabunna man.

He attended school at Marree. After school, he worked on the railways and cattle stations. Over the years, he and his family resided in several places, including Alice Springs, Tarcoola, and Gawler (north of Adelaide).

== Career ==
Buzzacott began his activism in 1982, on issues such as drug and alcohol abuse, Aboriginal education, Indigenous land rights and Aboriginal heritage and sacred sites.

In 1984 Buzzacott moved to Port Augusta, where he was employed as an alcohol and drug worker.

After moving to Alice Springs in the Northern Territory, in 1985, he was involved in a successful campaign to stop a dam being built on the Todd River. He also helped establish the Arrernte Council there, and served as a regional councillor for the Aboriginal and Torres Strait Islander Commission (ATSIC).

He returned to South Australia in the mid-1990s and started campaigning to protect his country.

In 1997 he attended the inaugural meeting of the Alliance Against Uranium (later the Australian Nuclear Free Alliance) and served as president for many years.

In November 1998 he gave a keynote address at the "Global Survival and Indigenous Rights" conference in Melbourne.

He has given support to the Aboriginal Tent Embassy in Canberra, where he lit the Fire for Justice on National Sorry Day, 26 May 1998.

A major campaign was trying to prevent damage to a major Australian water source, the Great Artesian Basin, when mining companies WMC Resources and later BHP were taking huge amounts for the Olympic Dam mine at Roxby Downs. In March 1999 he set up a protest camp at Stuart's Creek, on Arabunna land, and thousands of people visited and became informed about what the issues were, before WMC and local police finally evicted the protesters in December 1999. Buzzacott instigated a court action against Hugh Morgan, head of WMC, on a charge of genocide.

In April 1999, the Minister for Foreign Affairs, Alexander Downer, and the Minister for the Environment, Robert Hill, formally refused to pursue the World Heritage listing of Lake Eyre, instead allowing a mining company, BHP Billiton to commence mining operations. In the court case in which Buzzacott was the appellant, he claimed that Downer's failure to pursue World Heritage listing amounted to genocide against his people. Nulyarimma v Thompson was heard in the Federal Court of Australia and was decided in favour of the Government. He set up a protest outside Government House in Adelaide, dubbing it "Genocide Corner", until he was moved along by police after 21 days.

Buzzacott initiated a peace walk from Lake Eyre to the 2000 Olympic Games in Sydney, visiting prisons along the way. On their way through Canberra, they were met by a couple of politicians, and presented the Governor-General with a document of peace and justice. In Sydney, they joined the Aboriginal Tent Embassy mob in a protest.

In 2002 Buzzacott reclaimed his tribe's emu and kangaroo totems used in the Australian coat of arms from outside Parliament House, Canberra. He was charged three years later by Australian Federal Police at the Aboriginal Tent Embassy for theft of the coat of arms; he then charged the Australian government with theft. The case went to the High Court, which found they were unable determine any matter of Aboriginal sovereignty in Australia, as Australian courts are agents of the Crown and therefore "in direct conflict with the notion of Aboriginal sovereignty".

In 2004, he participated in the Peace Pilgrimage from the Olympic Dam uranium mine to Hiroshima, Japan.

Buzzacott was a supporter of West Papuan independence. In January 2006, Buzzacott gave a talk at RMIT in Melbourne where he argued that the Howard government should accept 43 West Papuan asylum seekers who had landed on Australian shores as refugees, using a canoe to paddle to Mapoon in Far North Queensland. They were granted permanent residence.

He was also involved in Camp Sovereignty at the 2006 Commonwealth Games in Melbourne.

In Melbourne on 21 April 2007 a group of non-Indigenous and Indigenous supporters raised money in support of his efforts to raise awareness about uranium mining issues.

In February 2012, Buzzacott legally challenged the Commonwealth Environment Minister Tony Burke's environmental approval of the Olympic Dam mine expansion. Environmental approval had been granted by state and federal governments in October 2011. Buzzacott was represented by the Environmental Defenders Office and appeared in the Federal Court in Adelaide on 3 and 4 April 2012. His challenge was unsuccessful and was dismissed on 20 April. An appeal of the judge's decision in 2013 was also unsuccessful.

On 6 June 2020, he gave an 8-minute address to a large crowd in Adelaide at a Black Lives Matter protest, as part of the George Floyd protests in Australia.

== Awards and recognition ==
In 2001 Buzzacott was awarded the prestigious Nuclear-Free Future Award, in Ireland, which provided him with an opportunity to travel to Europe and speak to supporters of Indigenous land rights.

In 2006, Buzzacott was awarded the Jill Hudson Award by Conservation SA.

The Australian Conservation Foundation awarded Buzzacott the 2007 Peter Rawlinson Award for two decades of work highlighting the impacts of uranium mining and promoting a nuclear free Australia. ACF executive director Don Henry describing him in the award citation as

A passionate and effective advocate for sustainable water management and for responsibility, respect and recognition of the rights, aspirations and traditional knowledge of Australia's Indigenous peoples. Kevin is a cultural practitioner, an activist, an advocate and an educator. He has travelled tirelessly, talking to groups large and small about the impacts of uranium mining and the threats posed by the nuclear industry. Kevin has had a profound impact on the lives of many people – especially young people – with his many tours and "on-country" events. For many young activists "Uncle Kev" is truly an unsung hero and, against the current pro-nuclear tide, his is a very important struggle and story.

In 2021 Buzzacott was inducted into the Hall of Fame by SA Environment Awards (presented by Conservation Council SA in partnership with Green Adelaide, Department for Environment and Water, and University of Adelaide Environment Institute). He was praised for his wide campaigning for cultural recognition, justice, and land rights for Aboriginal people, raising awareness on uranium mining and nuclear issues, advocating for sustainable water management, and for his impact on others' lives, particularly those of young people.

== In film ==
Buzzacott featured in several documentary films, including First Fleet Back: Uncle Kevin vs the Queen (2005), and shorts by filmmakers including Jessi Boylan and Pip Starr.

In 2003 the Special Broadcasting Service and the Australian Film Commission Indigenous Unit produced a documentary called We of Little Voice in the "Australia By Numbers" series, which featured Buzzacott on a journey through northern South Australia to hear the stories of Aboriginal elders who had experienced the effects of the nuclear industry, from uranium mining to nuclear testing.

== Publications ==
In 1999 Buzzacott published a collection of poetry, which included the text of his keynote address at the "Global Survival and Indigenous Rights" conference in Melbourne in November 1998.

== Personal life and death ==
Buzzacott's partner was Margret Gilchrist.

He died on 29 November 2023.
