= Eileen Kampakuta Brown =

Australian aboriginal elder and activist

Eileen Kampakuta Brown AM
- Born: 1 January 1938 (age 88)
- Organization: Kupa Piti Kungka Tjuta
- Awards: Goldman Environmental Prize (2003)

Eileen Kampakuta Brown AM (born 1 January 1938) is an Aboriginal elder from Australia. She was awarded the Goldman Environmental Prize in 2003 together with Eileen Wani Wingfield, for their efforts to stop governmental plans for a nuclear waste dump in South Australia's desert land, and for protection of their land and culture.

Brown, Wingfield and other elder women formed the Cooper Pedy Women's Council (Kupa Piti Kungka Tjuta) in 1995.

As a child Brown often had to hide from government officials, who had a policy of removing biracial children from their families and sending them to institutions. In 2000 she and Eileen Wani Wingfield published 'Down the Hole, a children's book based on their experiences of hiding from the authorities.

Brown was appointed a Member of the Order of Australia in the 2003 Australia Day Honours for "service to the community through the preservation, revival and teaching of traditional Anangu Aboriginal culture and as an advocate for indigenous communities in Central Australia".
