= Nuclear weapons tests in Australia =

List of atomic weapons testing conducted in Australia

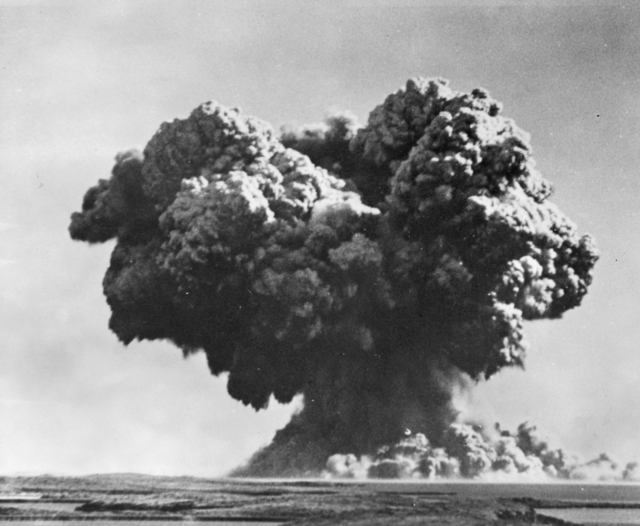
The detonation of Operation Hurricane at the Montebello Islands on 3 October 1952, the first British nuclear weapon test conducted in Australia.

Between 1952 and 1963, the British Government, with the agreement and support of the Australian Government, carried out nuclear weapons tests in Australia as part of its early nuclear weapons programme. The tests included 12 major nuclear weapon detonations conducted between 1952 and 1957 at the Montebello Islands off the coast of Western Australia, and at Emu Field and Maralinga in South Australia. Hundreds of smaller trials, predominately conducted at Maralinga between 1953 and 1963, were also carried out to support British nuclear weapons development.

== Sites ==
The British conducted testing in the Pacific Ocean at Malden Island and Kiritimati known at the time as Christmas Island (not to be confused with Christmas Island in the Indian Ocean) between 1957 and 1958. These were airbursts mostly occurring over water or suspended a few hundred metres above the ground by balloon.

In Australia there were three sites. Testing was carried out between 1952 and 1957 and was mostly done at the surface. A few hundred smaller scale tests were conducted at both Emu Field and Maralinga between 1953 and 1963.

=== Montebello Islands ===
Two separate atomic test projects occurred at the islands, the first being Operation Hurricane and the second being Operation Mosaic. Following the second Mosaic explosion, the radioactive cloud that was supposed to be taken away from the site, was sent back by wind that was not anticipated by the British scientists.

Major tests at Montebello Islands
Name	Date	Yield	Type
Operation Hurricane/Mosaic
Hurricane	3 October 1952 11:15	25 kt	In the hull of HMS Plym
Mosaic One	16 May 1956 11:15	15 kt	Tower
Mosaic Two	19 June 1956 10:14	60 kt	Tower

=== Emu Field ===
The atomic tests at Emu Field in 1953 were known as Operation Totem. The test site of Emu Field was abandoned just hours after the second and final test, Totem 2.

Major tests at Emu Field
Name	Date	Yield	Type
Operation Totem
Totem One	15 Oct 1953 07:00	10 kt	Tower
Totem Two	27 Oct 1953 07:00	8 kt	Tower

=== Maralinga ===
A testing site at Maralinga was established in 1955, close to a siding along the Trans-Australian Railway. Because supplies could be brought to the site via rail, it was preferred over Emu Field. A total of seven major tests were conducted at Maralinga. Both the Federal government and Australian newspapers at the time were seemingly supportive of the tests. In 1952, the Liberal Government passed legislation, the Defence (Special Undertakings) Act 1952, which allowed the British Government access to remote parts of Australia to undertake atmospheric nuclear weapons tests. The general public were largely unaware of the risks from the testing program, stemming from official secrecy about the testing program and the remote locations of the test sites.

Before the tests could begin the Maralinga Tjarutja, the traditional Aboriginal owners of the land, were forcibly removed.

An air base at Woomera, 570 km away, which had been used for rocket testing, was initially used as a base from which planes were flown for testing of the bomb clouds.

Major tests at Maralinga
Name	Date	Yield	Type
Operation Buffalo
One tree	27 Sep 1956 17:00	12.9 kt	Tower
Marcoo	04 Oct 1956 16:30	1.4 kt	Ground-level
Kite	11 Oct 1956 14:27	2.9 kt	Airdrop
Breakaway	22 Oct 1956 00:05	10.8 kt	Tower
Operation Antler
Tadje	14 Sep 1957 14:35	0.93 kt	Tower
Biak	25 Sep 1957 10:00	5.67 kt	Tower
Taranaki	09 Oct 1957 16:15	26.6 kt	Balloon

According to Liz Tynan from James Cook University, the Maralinga tests were a striking example of extreme secrecy, but by the late 1970s there was a marked change in how the Australian media covered the British nuclear tests. Avon Hudson, an atomic veteran who participated as an Australian serviceman during the later stage Minor Trials became a prominent whistleblower. Some resourceful investigative journalists emerged and political scrutiny became more intense. In June 1993, New Scientist journalist Ian Anderson wrote an article entitled "Britain's dirty deeds at Maralinga" and several related articles.

== Minor Trials ==
Over a decade, 1953 to 1963, a series of "Minor Trials" occurred testing components of the Atomic and Hydrogen Bombs using in some instances radioactive and toxic materials, such as Plutonium, Beryllium, and Uranium. Most of the minor trials involved conventional explosions to map out the radioactive dispersion and contamination of military assets, building structures and early crash test dummies. The Minor Trial of Vixen A dispersing Plutonium over a wide area by conventional explosive was considered to have had the longest half-life of any test or trial conducted in Australia.

Minor trials name, location and radioactive material
Year	Location	Trial	Material	Quantity (kg)
1953	Emu Field	Kitten	Beryllium	0.036
1955	Naya 3	Tims	Uranium	13.8
1955	Naya	Kittens	Uranium	5
1955–1957	Naya	Kittens	Beryllium	0.75
1955–1957	Kittens area	Kittens	Uranium	120
1956–1960	Kuli TM4	Tims	Uranium	6605
1956–1958	Naya 1	Rats	Uranium	151
1957	Naya	Tims	Beryllium	1.6
1957	Naya 3	Kittens	Uranium	23.4
1957	Wewak	Vixen A	Uranium	67.8
1957	Dobo	Rats	Uranium	28
1957	Taranaki	Vixen B	Uranium	25
1959	Wewak VK33	Vixen A	Plutonium	0.008
1959	Wewak VK29	Vixen A	Beryllium	0.14
1959	Wewak VK28	Vixen A	Beryllium	0.25
1959	Wewak VK27	Vixen A	Beryllium	0.27
1959	Wewak VK30	Vixen A	Beryllium	0.1
1959–1960	Kuli TM11	Tims	Beryllium	26.2
1959–1960	Kuli TM11	Tims	Uranium	67
1960	Naya TM100	Tims	Plutonium	0.6
1960–1962	Naya 2	Kittens	Uranium	32
1960–1961	Kuli TM16	Tims	Beryllium	39
1961	Kuli TM50	Tims	Uranium	90
1961	Naya TM101	Tims	Plutonium	0.6
1961	Wewak VK60A	Vixen A	Plutonium	0.294
1961	Wewak VK60C	Vixen A	Plutonium	0.277
1961	Wewak 60A	Vixen A	Beryllium	1.72
1961	Wewak 60B	Vixen A	Beryllium	1.72
1961–1963	Taranaki	Vixen B	Beryllium	17.6

== Opposition ==
Opposition to the tests grew throughout the 1950s. A poll in 1957 found that almost half the Australian population was against them.

== Health effects ==
The British Nuclear Test Veterans Association (BNTVA) was set up in 1983 to gain recognition and restitution for personnel who took part in British and American tests in Australia.

Veterans have claimed that they were treated as 'human guinea pigs' and that lives have subsequently been ruined as the testing had negative medical effects that last for generations, including cancers and children born with disabilities and genetic defects.

The veterans disagree with the Ministry of Defence that there is no correlation between health effects and the tests, and that "no information is withheld".

== Documentation ==
Several books have been written about the testing including Britain, Australia and the Bomb, Maralinga: Australia's Nuclear Waste Cover-up and Atomic Testing: The Diary of Anthony Brown, Woomera, 1953 from the My Australian Story series.

In 2006 Wakefield Press published Beyond belief: the British bomb tests: Australia's veterans speak out by Roger Cross and veteran and whistleblower, Avon Hudson. Investigative journalist Susie Boniface wrote Exposed: The Secret History of Britain's Nuclear Experiments in 2024.

== See also ==
- Downwinders
- Kevin Buzzacott
- List of books about nuclear issues
- McClelland Royal Commission
- Silent Storm (film)
- Banjawarn Station
- Australia and weapons of mass destruction
