= Kupa Piti Kungka Tjuta =

Council of Aboriginal women in Australia

The Kupa Piti Kungka Tjuta is a council of senior Aboriginal women from Coober Pedy, South Australia. They protest against Government plans to dump radioactive waste in their land, and for the protection of their land and culture.

The council was formed in 1995 by Eileen Kampakuta Brown, Eileen Wani Wingfield and other Aboriginal elders. The elders come from the Arabana, Kokatha, Yankunytjatjara and Antikarinya peoples. Kupa Piti is the Indigenous name for Coober Pedy; kunga tjuta means 'many woman' in the Western Desert language.

Brown and Wingfield were awarded the Goldman Environmental Prize in 2003 for their efforts.

In August 2004 the Australian government abandoned its plans for the nuclear waste dump, after a court decision.
