= Jim Falk =

Australian academic researcher (born 1946)

- Born: October 26, 1946 (age 79); Oxford, England
- Education: Monash University
- Known for: Science and technology in social contexts, nuclear technology, arms races and militarisation
- Spouse: Sue Rowley
- Parents: Werner D. Falk (father); Barbara Cohen (mother)
- Scientific career
- Fields: Physics, Science and technology studies
- Workplaces: University of Melbourne

Jim Falk (born 26 October 1946) is an Australian physicist and academic researcher on science and technology studies.

== Background ==
Falk was born in Oxford, England. His father was the philosopher Werner D. Falk (latterly professor at the University of North Carolina), and his mother an Australian, Dr. Barbara Cohen. Werner Falk had fled Germany prior to World War II and was studying and lecturing at the University of Oxford. The family moved to Australia when Jim Falk was young, when his father worked at the University of Melbourne. Falk attended Scotch College from 1952 to 1964, graduated with first class honours in physics at Monash University in 1968, and received his PhD from Monash in theoretical quantum physics in 1974. His late partner for 47 years was Emeritus Professor Sue Rowley (1948-2016), with whom he had two children. Jim Falk lives in Melbourne.

In December 2010 he retired, but remained an honorary professorial fellow in the Melbourne Sustainable Society Institute, at the University of Melbourne. He was the founding director of Climate Change research for the Association of Pacific Rim Universities World Institute, and holds appointments also of visiting professor to the Institute of Advanced Studies of Sustainability at the United Nations University (in Yokohama, Japan), and emeritus professor at the University of Wollongong.

== Scholarly contributions ==
For over 35 years Falk has studied science and technology in their social contexts. He has worked towards advancing understanding of the political, economic and cultural factors which constrain or facilitate the exercise of social control over technological change, latterly in relation to climate change and information technology but particularly nuclear technology, arms races and militarisation. Most recently he has focused on the broad issues of human governance (including what needs to be done to respond to challenges faced by humanity from climate change, to energy policy, and to issues associated with information flows and military threats).

One of Falk's books, co-authored with Joseph Camilleri, was launched by UNDP head, the Hon Helen Clark, in Sydney, Australia in February 2010. The book "Worlds in Transition: Evolving Governance Across a Stressed Planet", Edward Elgar, UK, is a synoptic overview of the way in which humans have come to collectively seek to shape their futures, and the challenges posed to that in a time of rapid transition.

Falk has made a number of media appearances in relation to the nuclear accidents at Fukushima and the implications for future energy policy. Jim Falk has recently authored a short e-book "Things that Count: the rise and fall of calculators" on the social history of calculation technology. It can be downloaded from a website he maintains on the subject. His current scholarly work is on the proposals associated with geoengineering, which were the subject of a seminar he presented at the United Nations University Institute of Advanced Studies in Yokohama, Japan, in October 2013.

== Publications ==
- J. Camilleri and J. Falk. 2010. Worlds in Transition: Evolving governance across a stressed planet, Edward Elgar, UK. 670 pp.
- J. Camilleri and J. Falk. 1992. The End of Sovereignty?: The future shaping of world politics, Edward Elgar, London. 312 pp.
- J. Falk and A. Brownlow. 1989. The Greenhouse Challenge: What’s to be done?, Penguin, Melbourne. 340 pp.
- J. Falk. 1983. Taking Australia Off the Map: Facing the Threat of Nuclear War. Penguin and Heinemann Publishers, Melbourne.310 pp.
- J. Falk (ed.). 1983. Preventing Nuclear War: Australia’s Role, edited proceedings of a Symposium held at the University of Wollongong on 10 September 1982, Uniadvice, the University of Wollongong, Wollongong. 80 pp.
- J. Falk. 1982. Global Fission: The Battle Over Nuclear Power, Oxford University Press, Melbourne. 410 pp.
- D. Hayes, J. Falk, and N. Barrett. 1976. Red Light for Yellow Cake: the case against uranium mining, FOE, Melbourne. 96 pp.
- "Things that Count: the rise and fall of calculators", eBook things-that-count.net, Melbourne, 2014. 187 pp.
