= Gavin Mudd =

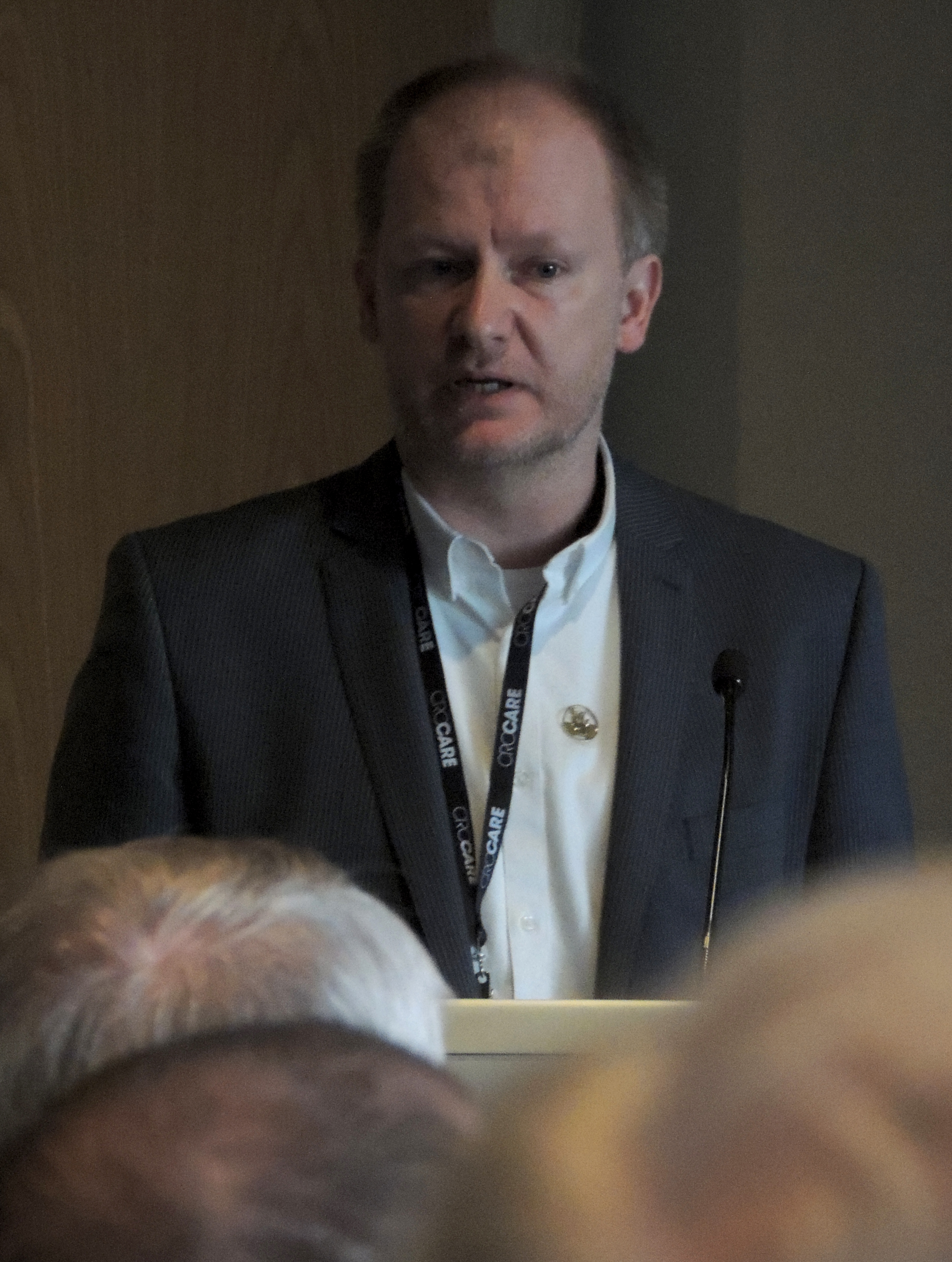
Gavin Mudd speaks at a CRCCARE forum in Adelaide (2015)

Gavin M. Mudd is the Director of the Critical Mineral Intelligence Centre located within the British Geological Survey. He was awarded a Ph.D. in environmental engineering in 2001, from the Victoria University of Technology. Mudd's research interests include critical minerals, circular economy, environmental impacts, management of mine wastes, acid mine drainage, sustainability frameworks, life-cycle assessment modelling and mine rehabilitation.

In October 2007, Gavin Mudd completed a report on Australia's Mining Industry entitled The Sustainability of Mining in Australia: Key Production Trends and Their Environmental Implications for the Future.

== Selected recent publications ==
- Sustainability of Uranium Mining and Milling: Toward Quantifying Resources and Eco-Efficiency
- Global Trends in Gold Mining : Towards Quantifying Environmental and Resource Sustainability? Resources Policy, 32 (1–2), 2007, pp. 42–56.
- Gold Mining in Australia : Linking Historical Trends and Environmental and Resource Sustainability, Environmental Science and Policy, 10 (7–8), 2007, pp. 629–644.
- An Analysis of Historic Production Trends in Australian Base Metal Mining, Ore Geology Reviews, 32 (1–2), 2007, pp. 227–261.
- An Assessment of the Sustainability of the Mining Industry in Australia Australian Journal of Multi-Disciplinary Engineering, 5 (1), 2007, pp. 1–12.

== See also ==
- Mining in Australia
- Mark Diesendorf
- Nuclear industry in South Australia
- Uranium mining in Australia
