= Nuclear power in Australia =

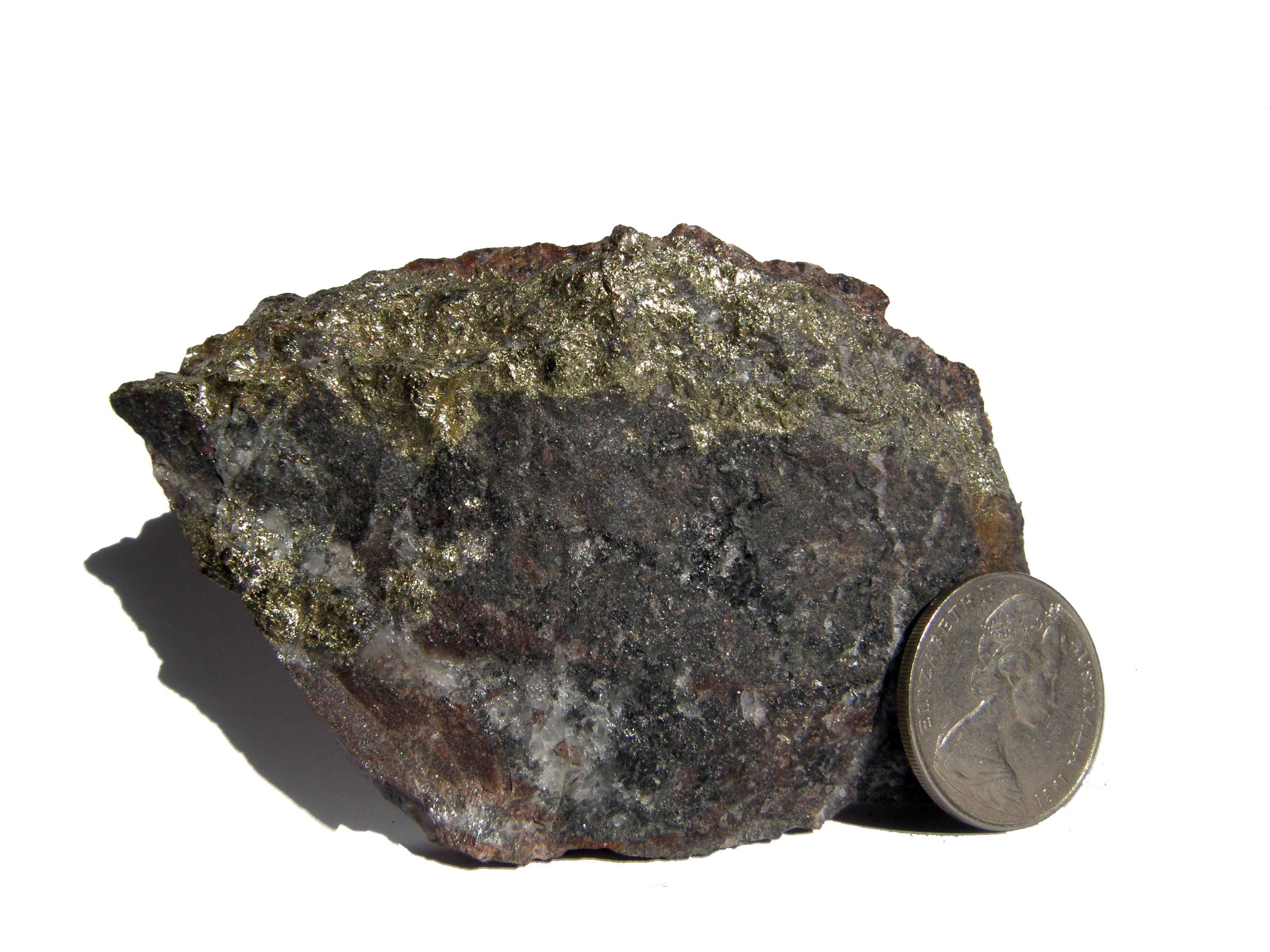
Chalcopyrite uranium-bearing ore from Olympic Dam mine, South Australia

Nuclear power in Australia has been a topic of practical debate since the mid-20th century. Australia has never had a nuclear power plant, and has only one nuclear reactor (OPAL), the third in a series at Lucas Heights, New South Wales, which have been used exclusively for research, training, and to produce radionuclides for both nuclear medicine and industry. Australia hosts 33% of the world's proven uranium deposits, and is currently the world's third largest producer of uranium after Kazakhstan and Canada.

Australia's extensive low-cost coal and natural gas reserves have historically been used as strong arguments for avoiding nuclear power. The Liberal Party has advocated for the development of nuclear power and nuclear industries in Australia since the 1950s. The Gorton government began work to construct the Jervis Bay Nuclear Power Plant in the late 1960s with a design specified to optimise production of plutonium for a secret federal government optional plan to produce nuclear weapons; after protests and boycotts, construction was abandoned following John Gorton's replacement as prime minister in 1971. An anti-nuclear movement developed in Australia in the 1970s, initially focusing on prohibiting nuclear weapons testing and limiting the development of uranium mining and export. The movement also challenged the environmental and economic costs of developing nuclear power and the possibility of fissile material being diverted into nuclear weapons production.

A resurgence of interest in nuclear power was prompted by Prime Minister John Howard in 2007 in response to the need to move to low-carbon methods of power generation in order to reduce the effects of global warming on Australia. In 2015, South Australian Premier Jay Weatherill initiated a Nuclear Fuel Cycle Royal Commission to investigate the state's future role in the nuclear fuel cycle. As of 2018 there are three active uranium mines, Ranger in Northern Territory, Olympic Dam in South Australia, and Beverley with Four Mile in South Australia. The Royal Commission determined that there was no case for the introduction of nuclear power to the electricity grid in South Australia, but it did not consider its potential interstate. In its final report of May 2016, the Royal Commission recommended that prohibitions preventing the development of nuclear power plants nationally should be repealed.

In 2017, former prime minister Tony Abbott advocated for legislation to be changed to allow the construction of nuclear power plants in Australia. The former Deputy Premier of New South Wales, John Barilaro, has also been urging for debate on the prospect of nuclear power in Australia, including the revisiting of Jervis Bay as a prospective site for a nuclear power plant. In November 2017, Senator Cory Bernardi presented the Nuclear Fuel Cycle (Facilitation) Bill 2017 in the Senate, with the intention of repealing existing prohibitions preventing the establishment of nuclear power in Australia.

Since 2021, there has been a groundswell of community support for the inclusion of nuclear energy in Australia's energy mix. The reasons often cited are concern about climate change, energy security, electricity prices, and environmental and community impacts of large scale renewable and transmission projects. Polling shows a majority of Australians now support nuclear energy. Nuclear for Australia and WePlanet Australia are the most prominent organisations associated with this change in community support.

== Historic and present nuclear reactors in Australia ==
In total, three nuclear reactors have been built and operated in Australia over the course of history. All have been located at ANSTO (formerly AAEC) headquarter site at Lucas Heights, New South Wales, and all have been research reactors that were not used for power (electric or thermal) generation. The first Australian nuclear reactor was the HIFAR reactor, which was operational 1958–2007, and the second Australian nuclear reactor was the MOATA reactor, which was operational 1961-1995 and became the first Australian reactor to be fully decommissioned in 2009, and the third Australian nuclear reactor is the OPAL reactor, which has been operational 2006–present. No other working (achieved criticality) nuclear reactors have existed in Australia, as of 2025.

== Unsuccessful nuclear power station concepts and proposals ==
=== 1952 Upper Spencer Gulf, South Australia ===
In 1952, South Australian Premier Tom Playford expressed with confidence that the first location for a nuclear power station in Australia would be on the shores of Spencer Gulf. In July of that year, it was announced more specifically that Backy Bay (later renamed Fitzgerald Bay), located between Whyalla and Port Augusta would be the site. The station was never constructed, though the region reemerged again in 2007 as a prospect for a nuclear power station during the Federal leadership of Prime Minister John Howard.

=== 1969 Jervis Bay, New South Wales ===
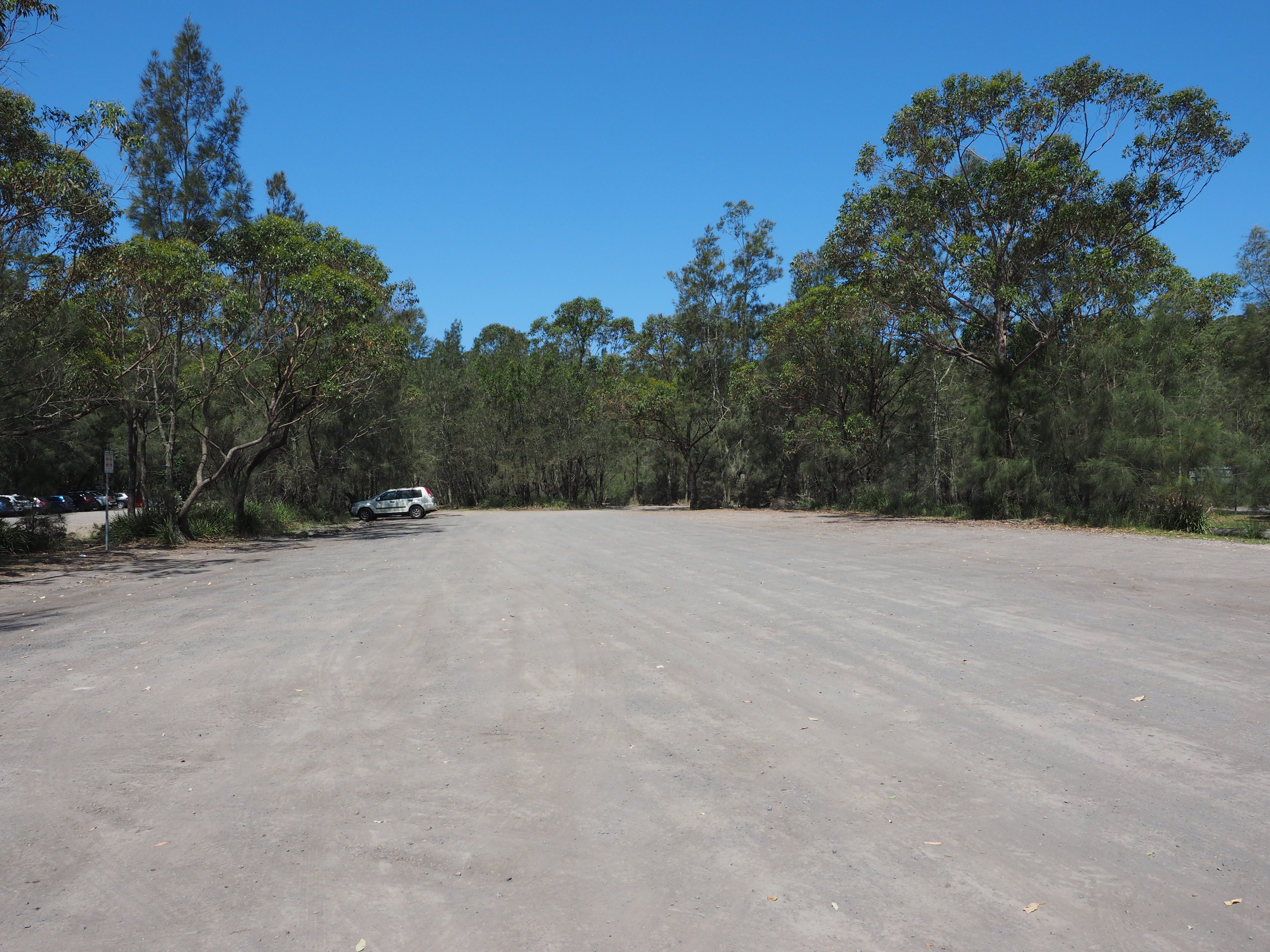
Part of the Murrays Beach Car Park in the Jervis Bay Territory in 2020; the car park occupies part of the site cleared for the nuclear power plant

In 1969, a 500 MW nuclear power station was proposed for the Jervis Bay Territory, 200 km south of Sydney. A local opposition campaign began, and the South Coast Trades and Labour Council (covering workers in the region) announced that it would refuse to build the reactor. Some environmental studies and site works were completed, and two rounds of tenders were called and evaluated, but in 1971 the Australian government decided not to proceed with the project, citing economic reasons.

=== 1979 Perth, Western Australia ===
In 1977–78, the Western Australian Government, under the leadership of Charles Court, announced plans for a nuclear power reactor near Perth. 1977 was seen as the year of mass mobilisation in WA, with 300 at the first anti-nuclear demonstration to 9,000 at the third protest in the inner city of Perth. Despite public protest, the WA Government selected a first site for a nuclear reactor in 1979 at Wilbinga, 70 kilometres north of Perth. Court predicted that at least another 20 nuclear power stations would be needed by the end of the century to meet rapidly growing power demand, but none of this came to pass.

=== 1980s and 2007 Portland, Victoria ===
In 2007 it was reported that businessman Ron Walker, director of the company Australian Nuclear Energy had considered Portland as a possible location for a future nuclear power station. Glenelg Mayor Gilbert Wilson said that he thought it was unlikely that such a project would receive community support. He added that he believed any community in Victoria would oppose it, were it to be located in their area. A concept to develop a 2,400 MW nuclear power station at Portland at a cost of $3 billion was previously raised and abandoned in the early 1980s. In 1983, nuclear power development became prohibited under the Nuclear Activities (Prohibitions) Act 1983 in the state of Victoria and the law remains in place in 2020. Section 8 of the Act also prohibits uranium milling, enriching, fuel production, fuel reprocessing and waste storage.

=== 2007 Upper Spencer Gulf, South Australia ===
While a nuclear power station in South Australia's Upper Spencer Gulf region was discussed intermittently from 2007, no formal proposal to construct a plant was ever made.

In 2007, The Australian newspaper revealed that a location near Port Augusta in the Upper Spencer Gulf region of South Australia was being considered for a future nuclear power station. A company called Australian Nuclear Energy had been registered on 1 June 2006 with three prominent Australian businessmen as major shareholders: Robert Champion de Crespigny (former Chancellor of the University of Adelaide), Ron Walker (former Lord Mayor of Melbourne) and Hugh Morgan (former director of Western Mining Corporation). Prime Minister John Howard supported the formation of the company, describing it as a "great idea".

Five days after the company was registered, the Federal Government established the Switkowski review into nuclear energy. The company examined the viability of building a 20-50 megawatt pilot station in the Upper Spencer Gulf area, at a cost of $70 million-$150 million, and had spoken to American company GE about supplying a nuclear reactor.

South Australian Premier Mike Rann responded to news of the investigation by saying:

It won't be built in this state while I am the Premier or Labor is in power ... read my lips, no nuclear power station in South Australia.

On 7 April 2011, former Australian politician Alexander Downer addressed the students of UCL's Adelaide campus, discussing nuclear power. A long term advocate for nuclear power, he told The Australian that the South Australian town of Whyalla (also on Upper Spencer Gulf) would be ideal for a nuclear power station to serve the interests of BHP, South Australia and the eastern states. He stated:

You could attach it to a desalination plant, so you could solve the problem of Olympic Dam and Roxby Downs ... The Upper Spencer Gulf cities, instead of using Murray River water, they could use desalinated water. And we would have a nuclear power station that would create power for the eastern states' grid.

The Olympic Dam project was expected to use about 400 MWh of electricity per day if the proposed mine expansion went ahead. In 2011, the Olympic Dam mine expansion received State and Federal environmental approval, but in 2012, the BHP board decided not to proceed with the mine expansion as planned citing weakened economic conditions as the reason.

In 2012 a first-of-a-kind study was undertaken in which a combination of solar and wind technology, proposed as a replacement for the ageing Northern coal power station, was comprehensively compared with a reference nuclear reactor. Assuming equal public confidence and an established regulatory framework, the nuclear energy option compared favourably on cost, reliability, commercial availability, plant lifetime and greenhouse gas abatement, among other criteria.

== Nuclear-powered submarines ==
In April 2016, Australia committed to purchasing French-designed Barracuda-class attack submarines with customised diesel propulsion systems, despite the existing French fleet being wholly nuclear-powered. On 15 September 2021, following the signing of a security partnership named AUKUS between Australia, the United States and the United Kingdom, it was announced that Australia would develop nuclear-powered submarines, using US and British technology. This sparked outrage in France which lost the contract for what was to become the most expensive defence acquisition in Australia's history. France withdrew their ambassadors in the US and Australia in protest of the deal. The surprise termination of the agreement by Australia under the Morrison government was settled with a payment of €555 million from Australia to France. Anthony Albanese stated that the failed agreement would cost Australia 3.4 billion dollars with "almost nothing to show for it".

== Nuclear power politics ==
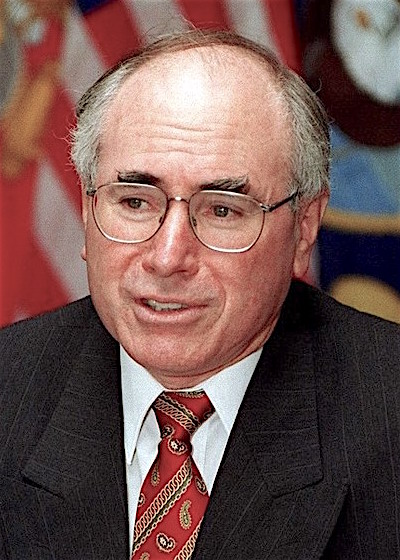
Prime Minister John Howard, 1997

=== 2000s ===
As uranium prices began rising from about 2003 onwards, proponents of nuclear power advocated it as a solution to global warming and the Australian Government began taking an interest. In late 2006 and early 2007, the Prime Minister, John Howard, made widely reported statements in favour of nuclear power, on environmental grounds. Faced with these proposals to examine nuclear power as a possible response to climate change, anti-nuclear campaigners and scientists in Australia claimed that nuclear power could not significantly substitute for other power sources, and that uranium mining itself could become a significant source of greenhouse gas emissions.

In 2006, the Howard government commissioned the Switkowski report, an investigation into the merits of nuclear power in Australia. The report concluded that nuclear energy would be competitive with coal-fired power stations if carbon credit sanctions were imposed upon Australia. The industry would have been able to produce its first power station in 10 years and could have delivered 25 such stations by the year 2050, thereby supplying Australia with a third of its baseload power.

Queensland introduced legislation to ban nuclear power development on 20 February 2007. Tasmania attempted a ban on nuclear power facilities, but later, did not pass the bill. Both bills were formulated in response to the pro-nuclear position of John Howard, in addition to the release of the Switkowski report.

Anti-nuclear campaigns were given added impetus by public concern about the sites for possible reactors; fears exploited by anti-nuclear political parties in the lead-up to the national election in 2007. The Rudd Labor government was elected in November 2007 and was opposed to nuclear power for Australia. The anti-nuclear movement continues to be active in Australia, opposing the expansion of existing uranium mines, lobbying against the development of nuclear power in Australia, and criticising proposals for nuclear waste disposal sites.

At the same time, a number of Australian politicians have argued that the development of nuclear power is in the country's best interests. Notably, on 13 June 2008, the New South Wales National Party’s annual state conference passed a resolution, proposed by delegates from Dubbo, supporting research into the development of a nuclear power industry, as well as the establishment of an international nuclear waste storage facility in Australia. The resolution was opposed by the delegates from New South Wales’ North Coast and by the party's state leader, Andrew Stoner.

In 2005, the Australian Government threatened to use its constitutional powers to take control of the approval process for new uranium mines from the then anti-nuclear Northern Territory Government. State governments controlled by the Australian Labor Party were blocking the development of new mines in their jurisdictions while the ALP's "No New Mines policy" was in force.

In April 2007, the Labor Party, under the new leadership of Kevin Rudd, voted at their national conference to abandon the policy. The vote was only won by a narrow margin of 205 to 190, and resulted in a large amount of internal criticism. Ministers Peter Garrett and Anthony Albanese remained outspokenly opposed to the decision due to the unresolved problems of nuclear waste storage and nuclear weapons proliferation.

The John Howard-led Coalition government went to the November 2007 federal election with a pro-nuclear power platform. The Labor Party won the election, and maintained its opposition to nuclear power in Australia.

=== 2010s ===
Nuclear debate in Australia increased after the Fukushima nuclear disaster in 2011. Some protesters demanded a halt to uranium mining and nuclear power generation in their country and throughout the world.

During the Labor-led Rudd-Gillard government, the party's opposition to nuclear power was upheld, while conversely, Resources and Energy Minister Martin Ferguson demonstrated his support for the uranium mining sector. Ferguson retired in 2013 and was replaced by Gary Gray who subsequently indicated support for future nuclear industrial development in Australia. At a South Australian mining and energy sector conference, he stated "I am optimistic that we will get (power) generation issues attended to and that it will be done in a timely fashion".

In 2013, the Liberal Party, led by Tony Abbott, resumed power and reopened discussions about the future of nuclear energy generation in Australia. Since Abbott's appointment, former Prime Minister John Howard, former Foreign Minister Alexander Downer, and several members of the Abbott government have openly advocated for the consideration of nuclear power development, including then-Foreign Minister Julie Bishop.

In November 2013, University of Adelaide Professor of Climatology Tom Wigley co-authored an open letter calling for an expansion of nuclear energy as a tool against climate change. Further calls for the consideration of nuclear power came from academics, Australian media and the Australian Academy of Technological Sciences and Engineering.

In 2014, the federal government released an energy green paper which articulated the potential for Australia in modern nuclear capacity, including small modular reactors, Generation IV reactor technologies and the role of thorium as nuclear fuel, though industry minister Ian MacFarlane opined that "there is no need to have a debate in regard to nuclear energy in Australia but we should focus on the opportunities that nuclear energy presents in other countries and build our uranium industry to take advantage of that." In contrast, Foreign Minister Julie Bishop declared support for nuclear energy, saying "It's an obvious conclusion that if you want to bring down your greenhouse gas emissions dramatically you have to embrace a form of low or zero-emissions energy and that's nuclear, the only known 24/7 baseload power supply with zero emissions." The call for sensible discussion was publicly welcomed by economists and at least one member of the federal opposition. The CEO of Origin Energy spoke in support of the prospect and Business SA demanded the lifting of federal prohibitions so that debate on specific designs could proceed.

In the lead-up to the 2014 South Australian state election, Business SA proposed the establishment of a nuclear industry to enhance the state's economic growth.

In December 2014, Australian Prime Minister Tony Abbott told the ABC that he was open to considering a proposal for a nuclear power project for Australia should one be made. He said that proponents of such a project should not expect to receive a government subsidy and that "if it's going to happen, it's going to happen because it's economically feasible." He also described nuclear energy as "the one absolutely proven way of generating emissions-free baseload power."

In January 2015 an open letter was addressed to environmental organisations and signed by seventy-five distinguished climate science experts, including twenty-seven Australian-based academics, endorsing the findings of a peer-reviewed article which quantified the potential climate and biodiversity benefits of nuclear energy.

In February 2015 South Australian Premier Jay Weatherill announced that a Royal Commission would be held to investigate South Australia's future role in the nuclear fuel cycle. Kevin Scarce, former Governor of South Australia, retired Rear Admiral of the Royal Australian Navy and current Chancellor of the University of Adelaide, was appointed Commissioner. A final report of the commission's findings was published in May 2016 which recommended that several existing legislative constraints be repealed.

In June 2016 Australia joined the Generation IV International Forum.

In June 2017, former Prime Minister Tony Abbott acknowledged fellow former Prime Minister Bob Hawke's support for expanding the nuclear industry in Australia and asserted that the "Australian Labor government under Premier Jay Weatherill would like to develop new industries to supplement the uranium mine at Roxby Downs. Why not have a nuclear submarine servicing facility in that state – and the industries that would inevitably spin-off?"

In November 2017, Senator Cory Bernardi presented the Nuclear Fuel Cycle (Facilitation) Bill in the Senate. The bill is intended to repeal prohibitions preventing the future establishment of nuclear power in Australia and the further processing of uranium and spent nuclear fuel. It is the sixth-oldest bill still currently before the Senate as of 10 October 2019.

In 2019, the Federal Government held an inquiry into nuclear power. It recommended that the ban be removed for advanced nuclear reactors.

On 6 June 2019 the state of New South Wales began an inquiry on the Uranium Mining and Nuclear Facilities (Prohibitions) Repeal Bill 2019.

On 14 August 2019 the state of Victoria launched an inquiry into Australia's nuclear prohibition.

=== 2020s ===
In September 2021, Australia, the United Kingdom and the United States signed an agreement that would allow for the sharing of nuclear propulsion technology between the three countries to assist Australia in acquiring nuclear-powered submarines.

In 2023, Opposition Leader Peter Dutton began advocating for the introduction of nuclear power in Australia; particularly, small modular reactors, which he claimed could be placed on the sites of decommissioned coal-fired power stations. On 19 June 2024, Peter Dutton announced his policy for the rollout of nuclear power in Australia. His plan called for the construction of reactors on the sites of retiring coal-fired power stations at Tarong, Callide, Liddell, Mount Piper, Port Augusta, Loy Yang and Muja, with the first two plants coming online between 2035 and 2037. It was noted that the proposed sites in Western Australia and South Australia would only be suitable for small modular reactors, with the other sites being suitable for either small or large-scale facilities. Dutton further proposed that the Australian Government would fund the construction of the reactors, and thereafter, assume ownership once they entered operation.

On 12 December 2024, after a months-long delay, Peter Dutton unveiled the costings of the Coalition’s nuclear policy. The modelling was completed by Frontier Economics at no cost to the Coalition, and claimed that seven nuclear power stations could be constructed at a cost of $331 billion, with the first plants coming online by the mid-2030s, and would produce 38% of Australia’s electricity needs by 2050, with the remainder being supplied by gas/storage (8%) and renewables (54%). It also claimed the nuclear scheme would be $263 billion, or approximately 44%, cheaper than Labor’s renewables-focused transition, which Frontier costed at $594 billion.

The modelling was criticised by a number of academics and observers who claimed that the costings were unrealistic, assumed less electricity demand than the government’s preferred economic scenario, and would arbitrarily extend the lifespan of coal-fired power stations whilst reducing investment in renewable energy projects. Frontier was also accused of employing creative accounting strategies such as amortisation to hide the full costs of the Coalition’s plan beyond the initial 25-year timeframe.

On 1 May 2025, LNP released a budget of federal investments for $36.4 billion till 2035, rising to $118 billion until 2050.

Following the Coalition’s defeat at the 2025 federal election, there was renewed debate within the Liberal and National parties about whether to keep nuclear as an official policy, with some MPs such as Tim Wilson voicing support, and others such as Maria Kovacic arguing that it should be dropped.

On 20 May 2025, National Party leader David Littleproud announced that his party would not be renewing its coalition agreement with the federal Liberal Party, a decision that was at least partly attributed to conflicting views over the Coalition’s nuclear energy policy. In this instance, the Nationals wanted to lock in funding for nuclear energy as a precondition for an agreement, but Liberal leader Sussan Ley refused to accede to their demands.

On 23 May, just three days later, Sussan Ley announced that the Coalition had agreed to the Nationals’ policy demands "in principle". However, the Nationals purportedly agreed to compromise on nuclear energy, settling instead for lifting the federal prohibition on nuclear power generation.

=== Nuclear waste storage ===
One of the arguments often made by opponents of nuclear power in Australia is the problem of managing long-lived and hazardous radioactive waste, including, but not limited to, spent nuclear fuel.

A case has been made for Australia to centralise the management of its nuclear waste, which is currently held in temporary storage facilities at various locations around the country.

In response to the Northern Land Council's withdrawal of a section of Muckaty Station in the Northern Territory as a potential nuclear waste facility for Australian domestically produced nuclear waste in 2014, it was articulated that the process had suffered from a lack of recognition of the limited hazard posed by existing waste, which is currently stored at over one hundred sites in cities and industrial areas. Furthermore, an open tender process for volunteered sites has attracted interest from pastoralists. Site nominations closed on 5 May 2015, in a process endorsed by Federal MP Rowan Ramsay. Ramsay supports the establishment of a waste storage facility in South Australia, and has said:

Having been to France, Sweden and Finland and looked at their low level repositories I'd be more than happy to have one on my farm.

On 29 April 2015 Josh Frydenberg MP, the Minister for Resources, Energy and Northern Australia, announced the shortlisting of Wallerberdina Station near Barndioota in South Australia's Flinders Ranges as a possible site. This site was ruled out in 2019, however two sites near Kimba are still possibilities as of the end of 2019.

In early 2025, The Age reported that Ted O'Brien, the Coalition's then-shadow energy minister, had told the newspaper that as part of his party's nuclear policy, spent reactor fuel would be temporarily stored on the sites of operational nuclear power plants, before eventually being transferred to the same underground repository that would be used to entomb high-level radioactive waste from the Royal Australian Navy's nuclear-powered submarines. Ever since the Coalition lost the 2025 federal election, it remains unclear whether nuclear energy will remain part of the party's official policy platform.

== Nuclear law ==
The Commonwealth Environment Protection and Biodiversity Conservation Act 1999 prohibits certain nuclear actions specified in s.22A unless a federal approval is obtained. It specifically prohibits nuclear power generation in s.140A (an amendment insisted upon by the Australian Democrats). The Act states that the Minister must not approve an action consisting of or involving the construction or operation of a nuclear fuel fabrication plant, or a nuclear power station, or an enrichment plant, or a reprocessing facility.

As of 2018, Australia has one operating nuclear reactor, the open-pool Australian lightwater reactor research reactor at Lucas Heights which supplies the vast majority of Australia's nuclear medicine. It replaced the High Flux Australian Reactor which operated from 1958 to 2007 at the same site, around a similar time to the MOATA reactor. These are the only three nuclear reactors to have been used in Australia. None of them has been used to generate electricity.

Additional nuclear industrial prohibitions exist under state legislation in South Australia and Victoria.

=== South Australia ===
The objects of the Nuclear Waste Storage Facility (Prohibition) Act 2000 are "to protect the health, safety and welfare of the people of South Australia and to protect the environment in which they live by prohibiting the establishment of certain nuclear waste storage facilities in this State." As such, the Act prohibits the:

1. Construction or operation of nuclear waste storage facility
2. Importation or transportation of nuclear waste for delivery to a nuclear waste storage facility

=== Victoria ===
The objects of the Nuclear Activities (Prohibitions) Act 1983 are:

to protect the health, welfare and safety of the people of Victoria and to limit deterioration of the environment in which they dwell by prohibiting the establishment of nuclear activities and by regulating the possession of certain nuclear materials, in a manner consistent with and conducive to assisting the Commonwealth of Australia in meeting its international nuclear non-proliferation objectives.

As such, the Act prohibits the construction or operation of a nuclear reactor as well as exploration:

1. for the production of uranium or thorium ore concentrates
2. for conversion or enrichment of any nuclear material
3. for the fabrication of fuels for use in nuclear reactors
4. for reprocessing spent fuel

== Nuclear power debate in Australia ==
In the 2010 book Why vs. Why: Nuclear Power Barry Brook and Ian Lowe discuss and articulate the debate about nuclear power. Brook argues that there are various reasons why people should say "yes" to nuclear power, and these reasons include:

- Because renewable energy and energy efficiency may or may not solve the energy and climate crisis
- Because nuclear fuel is virtually unlimited and "packs a huge energy punch"
- Because new technology solves the "nuclear waste" problem
- Because nuclear power is the safest energy option

Lowe argues that there are various reasons why people should say "no" to nuclear power:

- Because it is not a fast enough response to climate change
- Because it is too expensive
- Because the need for baseload electricity is exaggerated
- Because the problem of waste remains unresolved

In 2015, both authors were appointed to the Expert Advisory Committee of the Nuclear Fuel Cycle Royal Commission in South Australia.

== Advocates for nuclear power ==
=== Active advocates ===
==== Companies ====
- Australian Nuclear Energy is an Australian company established in 2006 to investigate the feasibility of developing a nuclear power industry in Australia. It sought to investigate the possibility of constructing a station in South Australia or Victoria. Directors include Ron Walker (former Lord Mayor of Melbourne), Hugh Morgan (former director of Western Mining Corporation) and Robert Champion de Crespigny (former Chancellor of the University of Adelaide). Ron Walker publicly welcomed the announcement in 2015 of a Royal Commission to investigate South Australia's role in the nuclear fuel cycle.
- Silex Systems is an Australian technology company which has developed SILEX (Separation of isotopes by laser excitation) for the purposes of uranium enrichment. The company has partnered with multinational nuclear power plant manufacturers General Electric and Hitachi and the world's largest uranium mining company, Cameco through a joint-venture called Global Laser Enrichment. In 2013, Silex Systems' CEO Dr Michael Goldsworthy advocated for Australia to embrace nuclear power. He told the ABC:

Our insatiable hunger for fossil fuels has to be tempered going forward and the only alternative for base load grid power, that's the power you need 24/7, other than coal, is nuclear power.

- SMR Nuclear Technology is a private Australian company established in 2012 with the goal of deploying small modular reactors in Australia and changing legislation to allow for it. The reactors are light water reactors and can be air-cooled so that coastal locations (which would otherwise provide seawater for cooling) would not be required. Technical director Tony Irwin described the reactors as being "the size of a large petrol filling station ... and the reactor is underground so it is again safe from external hazards or terrorists." Possible customers for SMR Nuclear Technology include large mining operations in remote locations. He also stated that the reactors would be suitable for integration into the existing Australian electricity grid system.
- South Australian Nuclear Energy Systems is an Australian private company registered on 1 January 2014. The company is chaired by merchant banker and former News International director Bruce Hundertmark and its board includes Ian Kowalick (former chief of staff to ex-Liberal premier John Olsen), Richard Cherry (former executive officer of the US nuclear industry and consultant), Eric Dunlop and scientists Tom Wigley and Stephen Lincoln. The company has discussed its business proposals with Federal and State politicians, with a view to amending laws that ban nuclear power generation. Hundertmark told The New Daily in 2014 that "The funding of the things that need to be done is not a real problem – the problem is to get the legislative changes needed".

==== Politicians ====
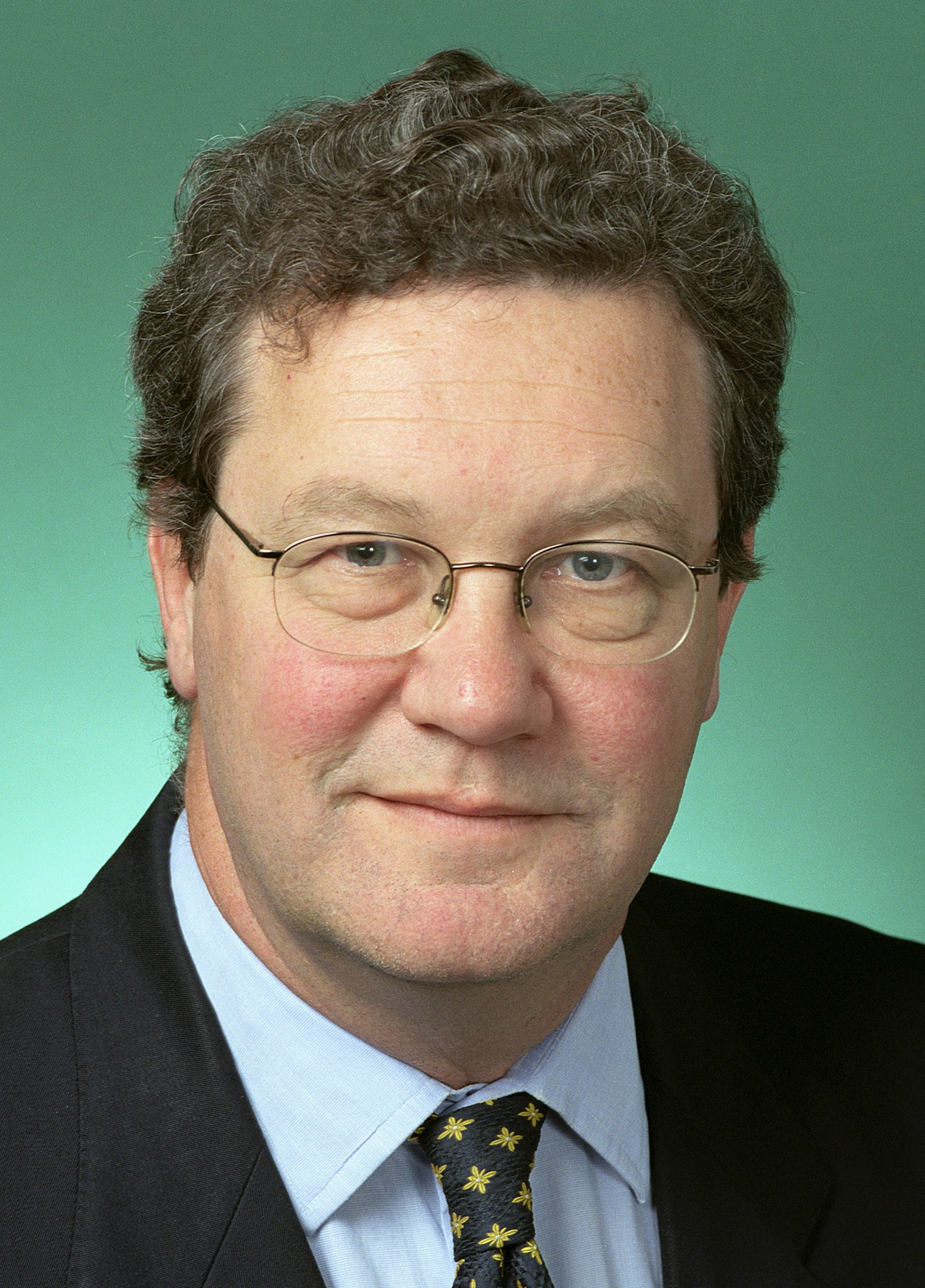
Alexander Downer

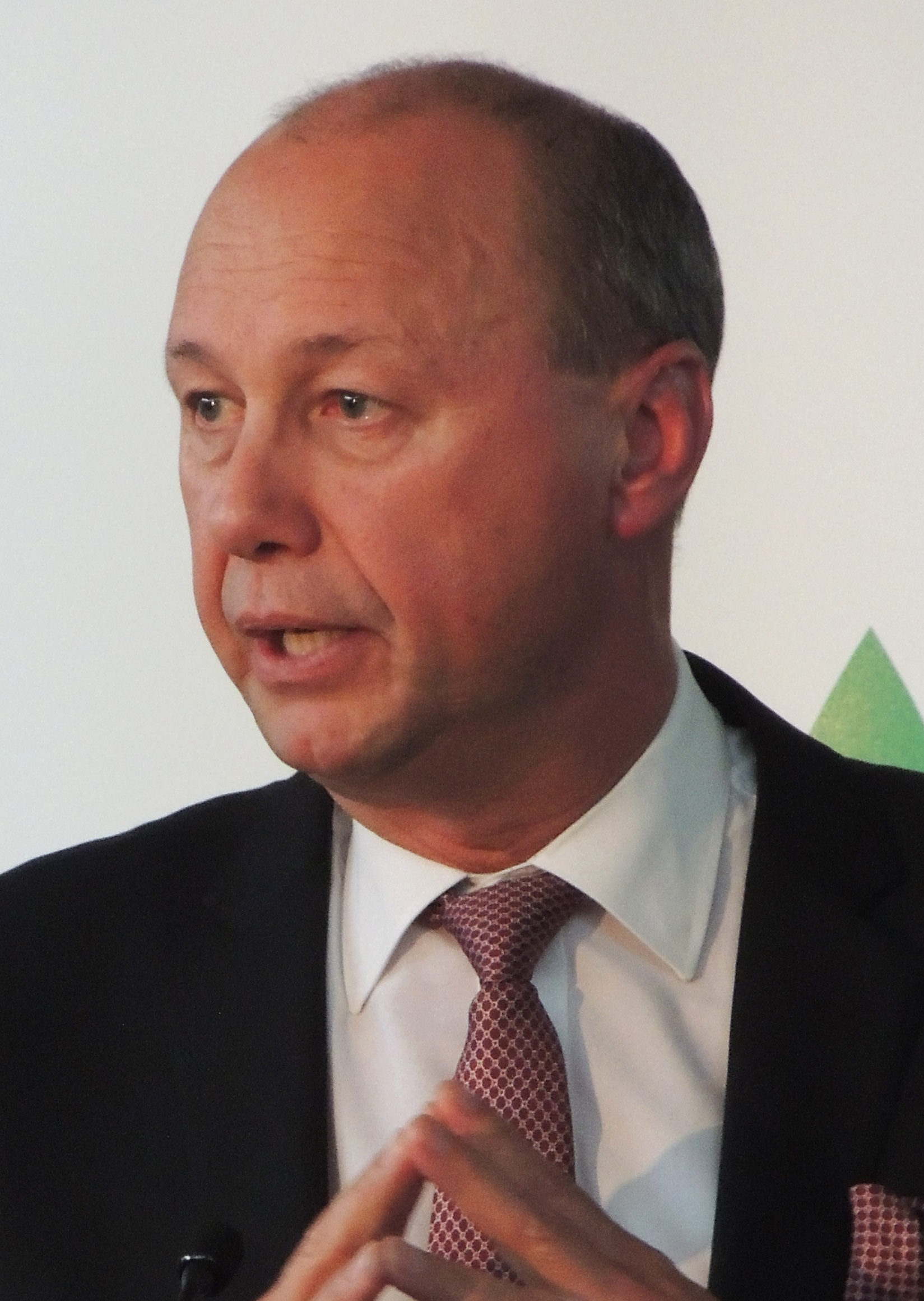
Sean Edwards

- In 2011, South Australian Treasurer Kevin Foley said that he thought Australia should embrace nuclear power.
- Former Prime Minister John Howard continues to advocate for nuclear power. In 2013 he stated that he believed nuclear power, shale oil, and fracking for gas will meet the world's energy needs.
- Former Federal politicians Alexander Downer (Liberal) and Martin Ferguson (Labor) have both advocated for nuclear power and for the expansion of uranium mining in Australia. In 2010, Liberal Opposition member Greg Hunt said of Ferguson: "Behind the scenes, we all know Martin Ferguson is agitating for nuclear energy against his Prime Minister, against Senator Wong." Despite coming from opposing major parties, Downer has described Ferguson as:

One minister who is not only competent but also does have convictions. He is the Resources Minister and often is quoted as supporting the further development of Australia's uranium industry. There is no doubt he also is a supporter of nuclear power in Australia.

- In 2013, Gary Gray suggested that opportunities existed for Australia in nuclear power and the nuclear fuel cycle.
- Former Prime Minister Tony Abbott and the Coalition government he presided over expressed support for nuclear industrial development in Australia. The Federal Government allocated $2.5 billion in the May 2014 budget to fund clean energy initiatives, including "clean power stations". On 13 June 2014, Abbott said that the Australian government "did not believe in ostracising any particular fuel". In 2010, while leader of the Opposition, Tony Abbott stated that he believed nuclear power was the only proven way to generate baseload electricity while reducing carbon emissions and maintaining Australia's standard of living.
- Liberal party Senator, David Fawcett offered expert advice to a concept plan for A nuclear future for South Australia, published in January 2013 by the Defence Teaming Centre.
- In November 2014, Federal Foreign Minister Julie Bishop described nuclear power as an "obvious direction" in reducing Australia's carbon emissions while utilizing the country's reserves of uranium.
- In 2015, Family First leader and Senator Bob Day presented a bill intended to legalise nuclear power and other nuclear fuel cycle activities in Australia. The bill did not pass. He also expressed his support for nuclear-powered submarines.
- In December 2016, former Prime Minister Bob Hawke described nuclear power as a means to fight global warming, and restated his support for Australia to import spent nuclear fuel from other countries.
- In 2017, The Sydney Morning Herald named the following Coalition MPs as supporting nuclear energy in Australia's future: Andrew Broad, James Paterson, Tony Pasin, Tim Wilson, Chris Back, Craig Kelly, Eric Abetz, Andrew Hastie, Warren Entsch, Bridget McKenzie and Rowan Ramsey.
- Former Liberal party Senator, Sean Edwards
- Former Premier of Western Australia, Colin Barnett
- Former ALP president, Warren Mundine
- South Australian Labor party MP Leesa Vlahos
- Former National party MP Karlene Maywald signed an open letter in 2016 following the Nuclear Fuel Cycle Royal Commission in SA, urging governments to continue considering the importation of spent nuclear fuel. A similar open letter was also signed in March 2017 by former MPs Trish White (Labor) and Ian McLachlan (Liberal).
- In 2017, Deputy Premier of New South Wales John Barilaro expressed his interest in exploring the possibility of nuclear power for Australia.
- In November 2017, Cory Bernardi of the Australian Conservatives introduced the Nuclear Fuel Cycle (Facilitation) Bill in the Senate. During subsequent debates, the bill was strongly supported by Senators Eric Abetz, David Leyonhjelm and Ian Macdonald.
- Former Liberal party minister and Leader of the Opposition, Peter Dutton

==== Defence ====
- Paul Barratt, former secretary of Australia's Department of Defence, has advocated for nuclear power to be adopted in order to reduce Australia's carbon emissions. He has an honours degree in physics from the University of New England and is a friend of fellow nuclear power advocate and former Prime Minister, John Howard.
- The Defence Teaming Centre's chief executive officer Chris Burns believes that South Australia could become the "future Dubai of the world" if it embraces nuclear industries, including enrichment of nuclear fuel.
- Governor General Peter Cosgrove believes that in the context of climate change "there is hardly a cleaner energy resource" than nuclear power. Cosgrove believes that Australia should be moving towards nuclear power and has disputed claims that nuclear power is unsafe, stating "We are a rich and technologically advanced nation sitting in a geologically stable continent. So surely we can expect to build and operate safe nuclear power stations."
- Australian Industry Group Defence Council chairman Chris Jenkins has recommended that Australia considers acquiring nuclear submarines. University of NSW Professor of International Security, Professor Alan Dupont supported the recommendation and defence analyst Professor Ross Babbage added that such a development would require a "specialist class of nuclear technicians" to service the fleet.

==== Individuals ====
- In 2006, Ziggy Switkowski was appointed to chair a Commonwealth Government inquiry into the viability of a domestic nuclear power industry. The inquiry concluded that Australia is well positioned to increase its production and export of uranium as well as adding nuclear power to its own energy mix. However, an independent panel of Australian scientists and nuclear experts have been critical of these findings, saying that they relied upon flawed assumptions while dodging important questions such as the disposal of radioactive waste and the potential greenhouse gas implications of increased mining. Switkowski was later appointed chairman of the Australian Nuclear Science and Technology Organisation (ANSTO). His term as chairman concluded at the end of 2010.
- Ben Heard is an environmental consultant and founder of Decarbonise SA, a blog where he advocates for nuclear power in South Australia. He has co-authored numerous articles with scientist Barry Brook, including a nuclear series for the South Australian Chamber of Mines & Energy. His business, ThinkClimate Consulting, has provided commercial services to uranium mining company, Heathgate Resources.
- Dick Smith held firm on his support for nuclear power following the Fukushima nuclear disaster in 2011. He said that burning coal "could result in hundreds of millions of people dying, and if that's true … that could be far worse than using nuclear."
- William Shackel is an advocate, who founded Nuclear for Australia in 2022, a youth-led campaign for the prohibition on nuclear energy to be lifted in Australia. He has made numerous appearances in the Australian media, where he presents a factual case about the position of nuclear energy in Australia.
- Tyrone D'Lisle is an environmentalist, who co-founded WePlanet Australia in 2022, a self described science-based environmental organisation working for a future where humanity and nature thrive together. Tyrone D'Lisle was a prominent member of the Queensland Greens from 2013 until 2018, including running as the Greens candidate in the seat of Dickson in 2013.

==== Media ====
- Commercial radio personality Amanda Blair appeared on WIN's Today program in March 2015. She repeated the phrase "go nukes" and talked about a possible nuclear waste dump in South Australia's north as being an economic boon.
- David Penberthy, Editor-in-chief of the News Limited website news.com.au published an editorial entitled "SA ticks boxes for nuclear energy and waste storage" on 13 March 2015. He drew attention to the modest number of protesters acknowledging the fourth anniversary of the Fukushima nuclear disaster and promoted the idea of South Australia becoming "the nuclear state".
- Senior writer for The Age, John Watson has espoused the safety of nuclear power stations in several pieces in 2013 with reference to the Fukushima nuclear disaster.
- ABC TV program Stateline in South Australia has run a number of stories on nuclear power since 2005. Voices in support of nuclear power including politicians, public servants and representatives of the uranium mining industry have outnumbered opponents. Stateline's former South Australian host, Ian Henschke has also written for The Advertiser espousing the merits of nuclear power.
- The Advertiser has promoted uranium mining in South Australia and has advocated for the expansion of the nuclear industry in the state by interviewing spokespeople from the business community, uranium mining industry, economists, academics and industry consultants. Reporting journalists include Cameron England, Christopher Russell, Valerina Changerathil, Tory Shepherd and Andrew Hough. The newspaper has also published many opinion editorial pieces promoting nuclear power. These pieces often diminish safety concerns held by opponents and promote the safety of nuclear power and in some cases, exposure to ionizing radiation. They also focus on nuclear power's ability to provide base-load power and its potential to replace coal-fired power plants thus reducing risk of catastrophic climate change. Opinion writers include Barry Brook, Geoff Russell and Ian Henschke. Counterpoints occasionally feature from authors such as Jim Green from Friends of the Earth.

==== Scientists ====
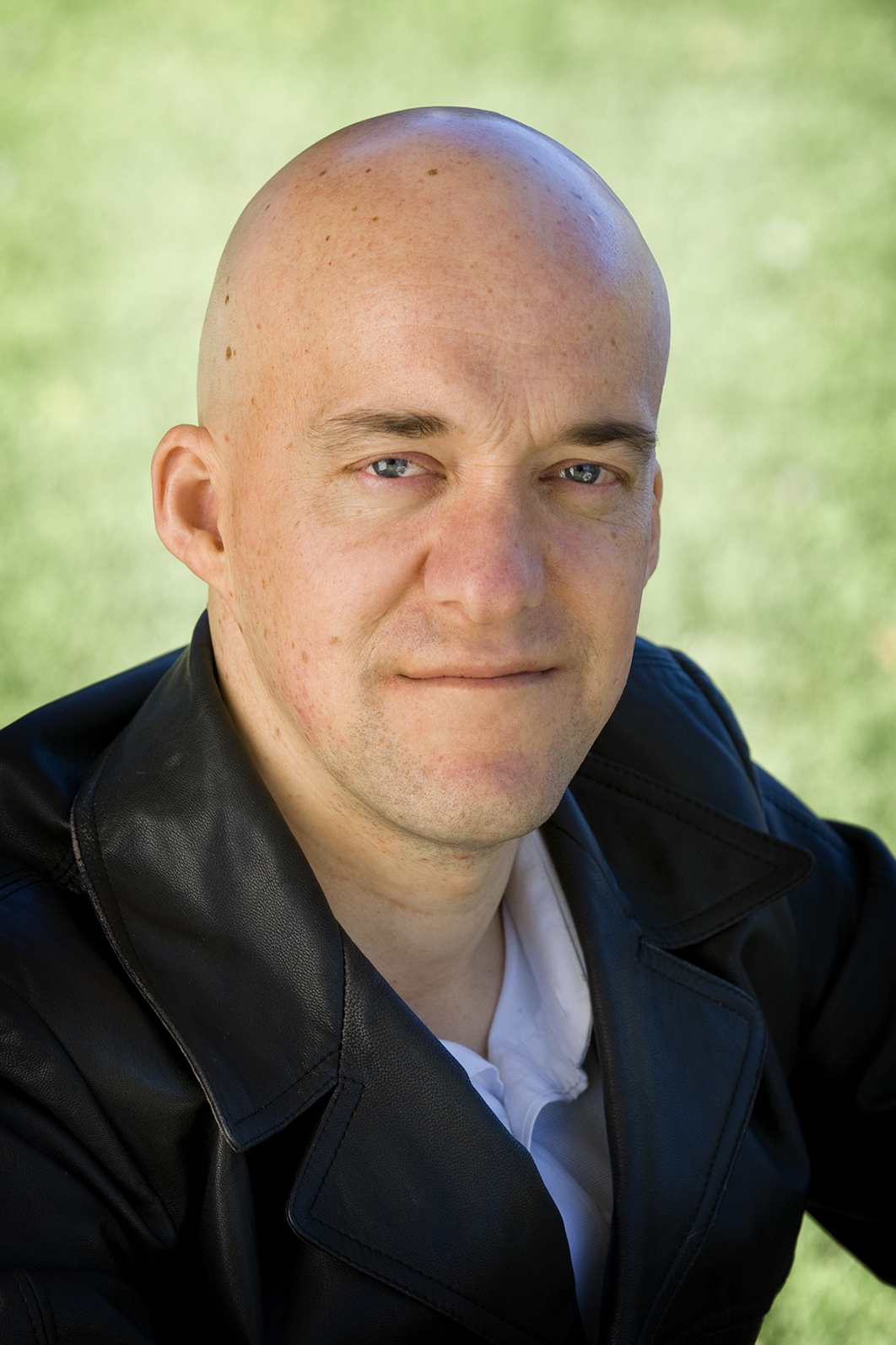
Professor Barry Brook

- Barry Brook is the current Chair of Environmental Sustainability at the University of Tasmania and a former professor of climate science in the School of Earth and Environmental Sciences at the University of Adelaide. He has been a strong advocate for nuclear power since 2009, promoting the technology as a means to mitigate the impacts of climate change, especially the Integral Fast Reactor. His most recent book is Why vs Why: Nuclear Power. The book was co-authored with Professor Ian Lowe, who represents opposing views.
- Tom Quirk is a nuclear physicist, former Rio Tinto employee and former board member of the Institute of Public Affairs. He supports the expansion of Australia's role in the nuclear fuel chain to include uranium enrichment, fuel reprocessing and waste storage.
- Tom Wigley and Stephen Lincoln are scientists employed at the University of Adelaide. They are also directors of the start-up company, South Australian Nuclear Energy Systems.

==== Organisations ====
- The Australian Nuclear Forum supports the development of nuclear power in Australia. Its members include Terry Krieg, a retired geology teacher from Port Lincoln who has supported nuclear power since 1981 and has appeared several times reading prepared statements on ABC Radio National since 2011.
- Australian Workers' Union National Secretary Paul Howes has been an active advocate for the legalisation of nuclear power in Australia and called for an urgent debate in 2009. He also referred to the uranium mining ban in Queensland and exploration bans in New South Wales and Victoria as ''superstitions of another age.'' Queensland and New South Wales bans were subsequently lifted.
- BusinessSA, South Australia's Chamber of Commerce and Industry, promotes nuclear power development. The Chamber has demanded the lifting of federal prohibitions so that debate on specific nuclear reactor designs can proceed. In December 2014, spokesperson Nigel McBride stated: "We need governments to get out of the way." Business SA is pushing for a specific project to be considered; a $3 billion micro reactor known as a Prism power plant designed by General Electric and Hitachi. A fast-breeder reactor, it would convert used nuclear fuel rods and surplus plutonium into energy. He described the technology as safe and innovative, and argued the proposal would pay its own way after five years.
- The Committee for the Economic Development of Australia (CEDA) supports the development of nuclear power in Australia. A policy document entitled Australia's nuclear options? was published by CEDA in November 2011. The document features five main chapters written by nuclear advocates including Barry Brook, Tony Irwin, Tom Quirk and Tony Wood.
- Engineers Australia's spokesperson Tony Irwin has called for "simple legislation change" to allow the development of nuclear industries, particularly the deployment of small modular reactors. Irwin is also technical director for the private company SMR Nuclear Technology.
- The Minerals Council of Australia advocates for nuclear power in Australia. Former BHP executive Daniel Zavattiero represents the MCA's uranium portfolio.
- The South Australian Chamber of Mines and Energy (SACOME) advocates for the development of nuclear power in South Australia. South Australia is home to the majority of the nation's uranium mines, and the Chamber represents the interests of several corporate members engaged in uranium mining and exploration. Members include Alliance Resources, Areva Resources Australia, BHP, Heathgate Resources, Uranium SA and others.
- The World Nuclear Association supports the development of nuclear power in Australia. The organisation's Senior Research Analyst and former Director of Public Information is Ian Hore-Lacy. Hore-Lacy was previously the director of the Melbourne-based Uranium Information Centre and worked for CRA (now Rio Tinto) for 19 years.
- Nuclear for Climate Australia is an advocacy group that proposes series of SMR as low-carbon and cost-effective solution for climate mitigation.
- WePlanet Australia is as a science-based environmental organisation working for a future where humanity and nature thrive together. A key campaign for the movement is 'Rethink Nuclear Australia'. They argue that bans on nuclear energy and uranium mining across Australia should be overturned to allow nuclear energy to be used domestically and globally alongside renewables to achieve climate goals.

==== Political parties ====
Support for nuclear power is usually associated with conservatism. Support for nuclear power has grown rapidly in recent years, especially among conservatives, due to its potential to assist Australia's emissions reduction targets. Australia's emissions reduction targets involve net zero emissions by 2050.

===== Coalition =====
The Coalition, a centre-right alliance that consists of the Liberal Party (the more conservative of the two major parties) and the National Party (its junior Coalition partner that supports agrarianism), supports introducing nuclear power. The party's support for nuclear power has grown over the years. Since the election of Peter Dutton as Liberal leader and Opposition Leader, the party has promised to build nuclear power plants in Australia if elected, with the proposed nuclear reactors to be generating electricity by 2035 (for small modular reactors) or 2037 (for larger reactors).

During the campaign for the 2025 federal election, the Coalition planned to build seven nuclear power plants at former coal power plants. They would have been located in Blackmans Flat and Muswellbrook in New South Wales, Traralgon in Victoria, Mount Murchison and Tarong in Queensland, Muja in Western Australia and Port Augusta in South Australia.

While the federal Coalition is actively pro-nuclear, the state branches are less active in their support. The Tasmanian branch is not as optimistic as other state branches, as Tasmania's electricity mix already includes a large amount of renewable energy, namely solar and wind power, as well as hydroelectricity.

Supporters claim that nuclear power is a cheaper and reliable source of energy and note that it is zero-emissions technology used in several other countries with major economies, and that Australia should also use nuclear technology. Others have also pointed out that Australia will in the future receive nuclear-powered submarines from the United States and the United Kingdom under the AUKUS agreement. Nuclear power has also long been backed by right-wing minor parties.

Opponents claim that the technology is costly to build and maintain and that nuclear power would not be available in Australia for decades. The Australia Institute advocates that the nuclear energy debate is diverting attention from more critical climate issues, advocating for a focus on immediate solutions to address climate change.

===== Minor parties =====
Nuclear power has long been backed by parliamentary right-wing minor parties such as Pauline Hanson's One Nation, the Libertarian Party the United Australia Party

Extra-parliamentary parties such as the Australian Citizens Party also back nuclear power, while the Fusion Party supports research into fusion power. Additionally, the Australian Conservatives and the Environmentalists for Nuclear Energy Australia supported nuclear power during their existences.

=== Past and former advocates ===
- Professor David Wigg (1933–2010), was the clinical examiner in radiotherapy physics for the Royal Australian and New Zealand College of Radiologists from 1970 to 1978, and directed the expansion of radiation oncology and clinical radiobiology at the Royal Adelaide Hospital from 1980 until 1997. In the years before his death, he published his views on the safety of low-dose radiation and the related misconceptions that impeded effective medical uses of radiation and the benefits of uranium mining and nuclear energy.
- The Australian Uranium Association was founded in September 2006 and advocated for the interests of uranium mining member companies. Its two full members were BHP Billiton and Energy Resources Australia (ERA), operators of the nation's two most established uranium mines: Olympic Dam and Ranger. In 2013, its work was integrated into the operation of the Minerals Council of Australia and the association was wound up.
- The Uranium Information Centre promoted uranium mining and nuclear power in Australia from its establishment in 1978 until 2008. It was effectively succeeded by the Australian Uranium Association.
- Tim Flannery is a professor at Macquarie University, and the chairman of the Copenhagen Climate Council, an international climate change awareness group. In 2006 he supported nuclear power as a possible solution for reducing Australia's carbon emissions, but in 2007 he changed his position and in May 2007 told a business gathering in Sydney that while nuclear energy does have a role elsewhere in the world, Australia's abundance of renewable resources rule out the need for nuclear power in the near term. He does however feel that Australia should and will have to supply its uranium to those other countries that do not have access to renewables like Australia does.
- Sir Ernest William Titterton (1916–1990) was a nuclear physicist and professor who publicly advocated nuclear power for Australia.
- Sir Philip Baxter (1905–1989), a British chemical engineer, was one of the most prolific public advocates of nuclear power in Australia.

== Opposition to nuclear power ==
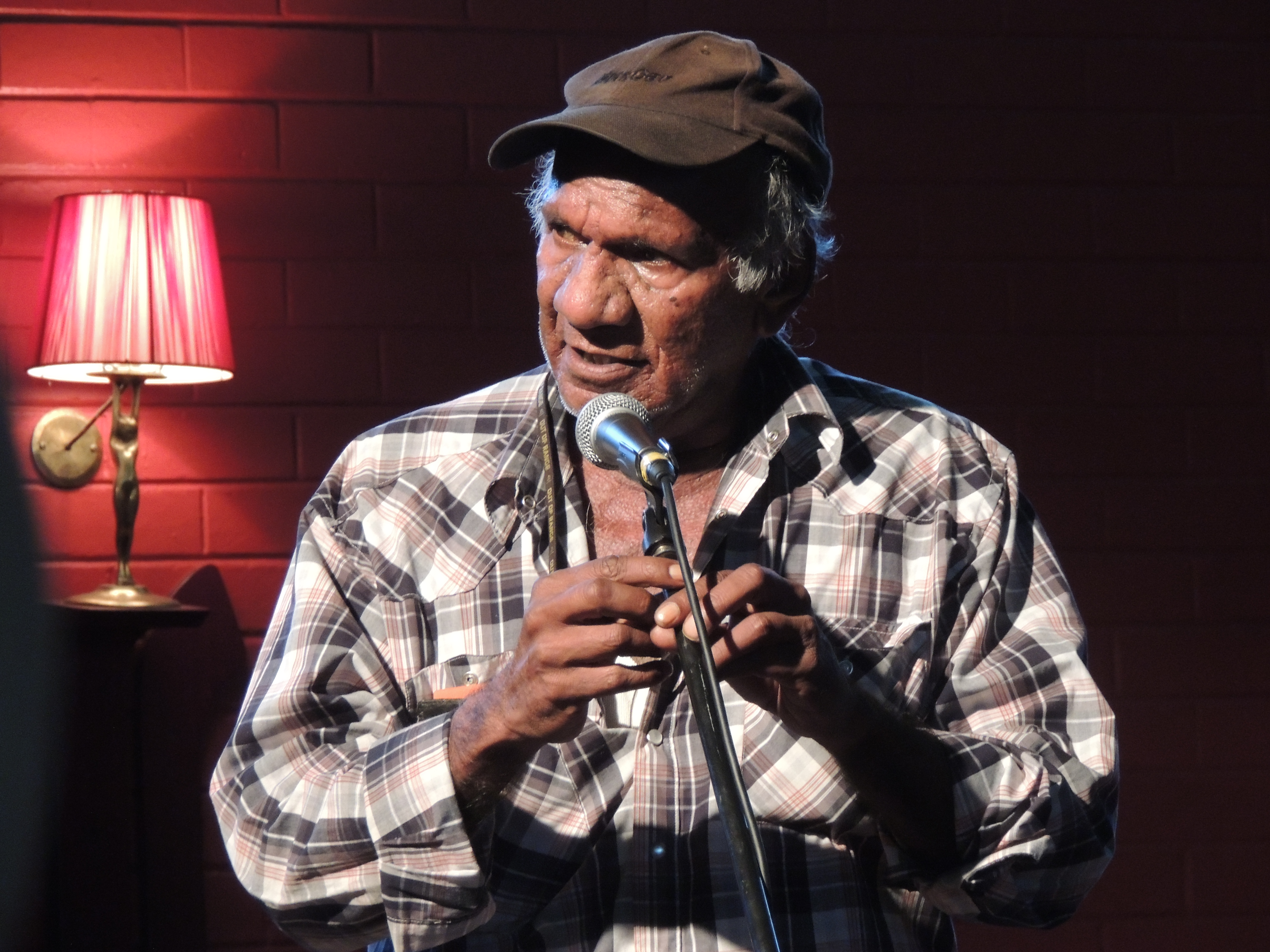
Uncle Kevin Buzzacott (2014)

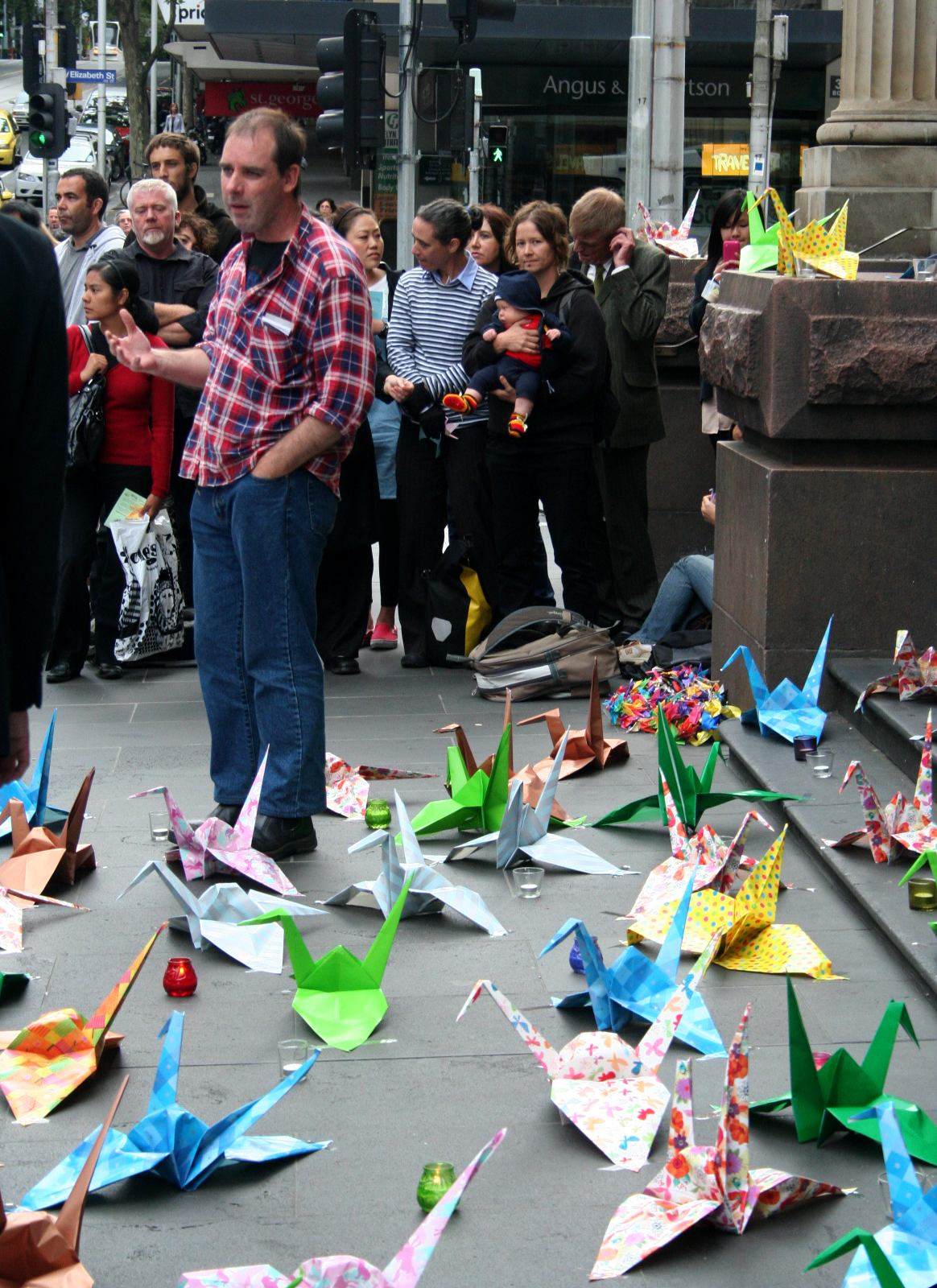
Australian anti-nuclear campaigner Jim Green at Melbourne's GPO in March 2011

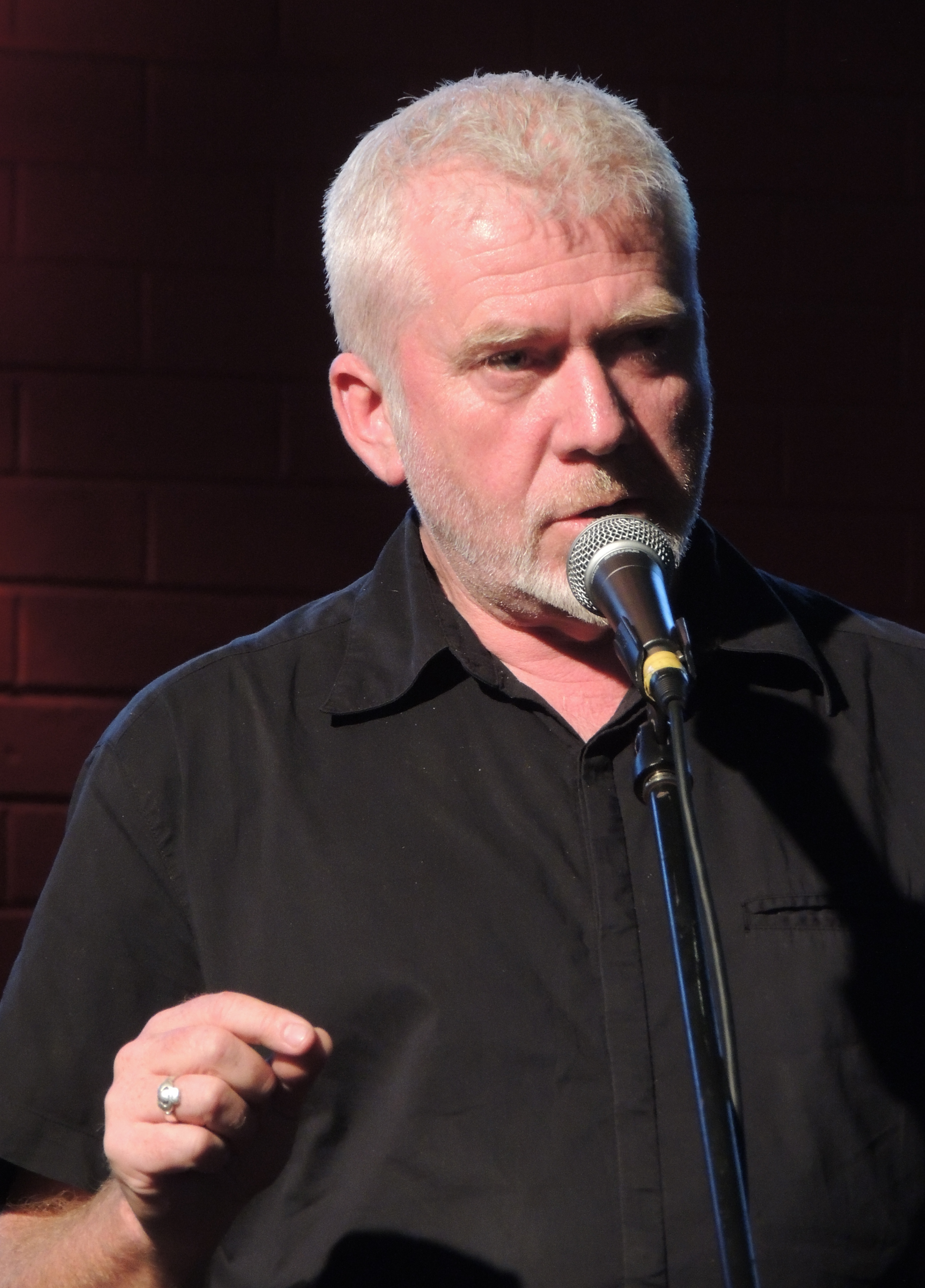
Australian Conservation Foundation anti-nuclear campaigner, Dave Sweeney (2014)

Opposition to the development of nuclear power in Australia originated in the 1970s. The Australian anti-nuclear movement initially lobbied for bans on nuclear weapons testing in the Pacific and on uranium mining in Australia. Helen Caldicott, a pediatrician from Melbourne emerged as a leading voice of the movement as she conducted public talks and informed politicians and trade unions of the health risks of exposure to ionizing radiation.

Western Australia has a significant share of the Australia's uranium reserves, but between 2002 and 2008, a statewide ban on uranium mining was in force. The ban was lifted when the Liberal Party was voted into power in the state and, as of 2010, many companies are exploring for uranium in Western Australia. One of the industry's major players, the mining company BHP Billiton, planned to develop the Yeelirrie uranium project in a 17 billion dollar project. Two other projects in Western Australia are further advanced then BHP's Yeelirrie, these being the Lake Way uranium project, which is pursued by Toro Energy, and the Lake Maitland uranium project, pursued by Mega Uranium. But it is unlikely that any new projects will enter active development until the market improves. As of 2013 uranium prices are very low.

As of late 2010, there were calls for Australians to debate whether the nation should adopt nuclear power as part of its energy mix. Nuclear power is seen to be "a divisive issue that can arouse deep passions among those for and against".

Following the March 2011 Fukushima nuclear emergency in Japan, where three nuclear reactors were damaged by explosions, Ian Lowe sees the nuclear power option as being risky and unworkable for Australia. Lowe says nuclear power is too expensive, with insurmountable problems associated with waste disposal and weapons proliferation. It is also not a fast enough response to address climate change. Lowe advocates renewable energy which is "quicker, less expensive and less dangerous than nuclear". The Australia Institute advocates that the last thing Australia's energy market needs is nuclear power. The data is clear—expanding renewables will drive down electricity costs. As long as the energy market relies on gas and coal, Australians will continue to face high electricity prices. Introducing nuclear power into the system would likely drive costs even higher.

Nuclear reactors are banned in Queensland and Tasmania. Uranium mining was previously prohibited in New South Wales under the Uranium Prohibition Act of 1986, however in 2012 Premier Barry O'Farrell amended the legislation to allow prospecting and mining of uranium in that State.

In December 2011, the sale of uranium to India was a contentious issue. MPs clashed over the issue and protesters were marched from Sydney's convention centre before Prime Minister Julia Gillard's motion to remove a party ban on uranium sales to India was narrowly supported 206 votes to 185. Long-time anti-nuclear campaigner Peter Garrett MP spoke against the motion.

More than 400 people joined a "Lizard's Revenge march" to the Olympic Dam site in July 2012. The anti-nuclear activists, including Elder Kevin Buzzacott, protested against the mine expansion and the uranium industry. They say the company and the government have put short-term economic gain ahead of environmental and health concerns. Organiser Nectaria Calan said police harassed protesters, demanding identification and controlling access to and from their campsite.

In March 2012, hundreds of anti-nuclear demonstrators converged on the Australian headquarters of global mining giants BHP Billiton and Rio Tinto. The 500-strong march through southern Melbourne called for an end to uranium mining in Australia, and included speeches and performances by representatives of the expatriate Japanese community as well as Australia's Indigenous communities, who are concerned about the effects of uranium mining near tribal lands. There were also events in Sydney.

A site within Muckaty Station was being considered for Australia's low-level and intermediate-level radioactive waste storage and disposal facility. The plan was subject to a Federal Court challenge. The nomination of Muckaty was withdrawn in June 2014.

Historically, many prospective Australian uranium mines have been constrained by active antinuclear opposition, but state governments have now approved mine development in Western Australia and Queensland. But it is unlikely that any new projects will enter active development until the market improves. As of 2013 uranium prices are very low. Cameco placed the Kintyre project on hold until market prices improve and Paladin has stated that its project proposals (Bigrlyi, Angela/Pamela, Manyingee, Oobagooma, and Valhalla/Skal) need higher uranium market prices before they can proceed. Toro wants to take the Wiluna proposal to the development phase, but has not been successful in attracting equity investors. When market prices go up again, so that mine development is justified, most projects would need at least five years to proceed to production.

As of 2015, nuclear power remains opposed by a number of not-for-profit and environmental organizations, political parties and their members, renewable energy advocates, and anti-nuclear campaigners. There are a number of prominent Australians who have publicly expressed anti-nuclear views:

- Dorothy Auchterlonie
- Van Badham
- David Bradbury
- Bob Brown
- Eileen Kampakuta Brown
- Kevin Buzzacott
- Helen Caldicott
- Moss Cass
- Ian Cohen
- Kerry Nettle
- Mark Diesendorf
- Jim Falk
- Peter Garrett
- Jim Green
- Margaret Holmes
- Jacqui Katona
- Sandra Kanck
- Ian Lowe
- Scott Ludlam
- Yvonne Margarula
- Dee Margetts
- John Quiggin
- Nancy Shelley
- Jo Vallentine
- Giz Watson
- Patrick White
- Stuart White

=== Notable anti-nuclear groups ===
- Australian Conservation Foundation
- Australian Nuclear Free Alliance
- Conservation Council of South Australia
- Friends of the Earth Australia
- Greenpeace Australia Pacific
- Kupa Piti Kungka Tjuta
- The Australia Institute
- The Wilderness Society

=== Political parties ===
- The Australian Greens are formally opposed to nuclear power in Australia. The party's spokesperson on the issue is South Australian senator, Sarah Hanson-Young.
- The Australian Labor Party was internally conflicted over uranium mining policy during the leadership of former Prime Minister Bob Hawke during the 1980s, but has maintained opposition to the development of nuclear power in Australia. Since the Rudd government, some Labor party politicians have expressed their support for expanded nuclear industries in Australia. These include Martin Ferguson and Tom Koutsantonis. Koutsantonis has expressed his support for the development of uranium enrichment capacity in South Australia.

== Opinion polls ==
A McNair Gallup poll on the construction of nuclear power stations in Australia was carried out in 1979. The same poll was conducted again 28 years later in 2007 on 1,000 randomly selected people throughout Australia. A new poll was asked in 2009 which marked the first time that more people support nuclear power than oppose it, although the support for nuclear power was still not an outright majority. Respondents were asked the following question:

Do you favour or oppose the construction of nuclear power stations in Australia?
	1979	2007	2009
Favour	34%	41%	49%
Oppose	56%	53%	43%
Don't know	10%	6%	8%

The 1979 poll was conducted soon after the Three Mile Island Unit 2 (TMI-2) nuclear power plant accident located near Pennsylvania USA where a sequence of events lead to the partial meltdown of the TMI-2 reactor core.

Opposition to the construction of nuclear power stations in the 2007 poll was strongest amongst females, Greens supporters and Australians aged 18–29 and 40–49.

Do you favour or oppose the construction of nuclear power stations in Australia?
	TOTAL	ALP	Coalition	Greens
Favour	41%	30%	59%	22%
Oppose	53%	66%	34%	78%
Don't know	6%	4%	7%	0%

The McNair Gallup Poll showed a significant difference in opinion between ALP, Coalition and Green supporters, and moderate differences by gender. Men were more likely to favour the construction of nuclear power stations (55%), with twice as many males in favour of the construction of nuclear power stations in Australia than women. 41% of men were more likely to oppose the construction of nuclear power stations in Australia. In contrast, 65% of women were more likely to oppose the construction of nuclear power stations in Australia, while 28% favour the construction of nuclear power stations.

A 2014 independent survey, commissioned by SACOME, of 1,214 South Australians revealed a distinct trend in the community towards supporting consideration of nuclear energy.

Please rate your level of support for Nuclear Power.
	TOTAL	Female	Male	18–34	35–50	51–65	65+
Total Support	48.0%	44.5%	64.4%	52.3%	53.8%	52.3%	59.8%
Neutral	19.5%	26.2%	16.9%	22.9%	20.6%	21.6%	21.8%
Total Oppose	32.6%	29.3%	18.6%	24.7%	25.6%	26.0%	18.4%

The proportion of neutral respondents was at around 20-25% in all categories, with qualitative feedback largely indicating conditional support given the satisfactory addressing of concerns, or a requirement for further information. Positive responses outnumbered the negative, most dramatically men and the elderly, with less dramatic support from women.

A Morgan poll in September 2019 found support for Australian nuclear power had attained a narrow majority, with 51% in favour when reduction of carbon emissions was cited. This was an increase of 16 percentage points from July 2011.

A poll by The Australia Institute showed that of 1,002 Australians found confusion over how the $268 billion to $368 billion nuclear-powered submarine program should be funded, with respondents asked to choose between cuts to defense spending, government services, increasing the deficit, or raising taxes.

A February 2024 poll published by the Sydney Morning Herald found that 36% supported Nuclear power in Australia, 27% were open to it, 23% were opposed and 15% were Undecided.

An April 2024 Essential Research poll found that 52% supported Australia developing nuclear power plants, 31% opposed and 17% unsure.

The Australia Institute's June 2024 Polling – Willingness to pay for nuclear indicated that 65% of Australians are unwilling to pay extra for nuclear energy, with only 4% prepared to pay more than $500 annually, suggesting limited public support for increased electricity costs to include nuclear power in the energy mix.

An MRP model created by DemosAU from a survey of 3275 Australians between December 2024 and February 2025 showed support for nuclear did not rise about 50% in any electorate in Australia, while opposition to nuclear only reached 50% in one electorate. Nationwide, 37% or respondents agreed with the statement "Nuclear power would be good for Australia," while 33% disagreed and 30% were neutral. Opposition to nuclear was much stronger among women than men.

WePlanet Australia polling conducted by Essential Research Poll of 1067 Australian adults between 24 and 28 April 2026 found that 52% of respondents supported Australia developing nuclear power for electricity generation, while 33% opposed it and 15% were undecided. The poll found majority support across most demographic groups, with support highest among younger Australians, men, Coalition voters and Labor voters, while opposition was stronger among women and older Australians.

== See also ==
- Australia and weapons of mass destruction
- Open-pool Australian lightwater reactor
- Contesting the Future of Nuclear Power – a 2011 book on nuclear power
- Greenhouse Solutions with Sustainable Energy – a 2007 book on sustainability
- List of books about nuclear issues
- Non-Nuclear Futures – a 1975 book on nuclear power
- Nuclear or Not? – a 2007 book on nuclear power
- Nuclear Fuel Cycle Royal Commission
- Reaction Time: Climate Change and the Nuclear Option – 2007 book about energy policy
- Renewable energy commercialization
- Western Australian radioactive capsule incident
- Australian Submarine Agency – statutory agency responsible for guiding Australia’s nuclear-powered submarine program
