= Hundertmark =

Hundertmark is a surname. Notable people with the surname include:

- Bruce Hundertmark, Australian businessman
- Jean Hundertmark (born 1954), American politician
- Lothar Hundertmark, German composer
- Rowan Hundertmark, Australian rules football umpire until 2017
- Karl Friedrich Hundertmark (1715–1762), German author
