= Environment Institute University of Adelaide =

Australian research institute

Environment Institute at Adelaide University
- Abbreviation: EI
- Formation: 2009
- Headquarters: Adelaide, South Australia
- Region served: International
- Official language: English
- Executive Director: Bob Hill
- Budget: A$10 million (2009)
- Staff: 250
- Website: www.adelaide.edu.au/environment

The Environment Institute at the Adelaide University brings together research groups in fields of science, engineering and economics relating to the management and use of natural resources and infrastructure. Research undertaken within the Institute aims to contribute to improvements in the management of natural resources including water, soil, land and native flora and fauna, particularly under changing climate and economic conditions. It was launched on the eve of World Environment Day, 4 June 2009.

The mission of the Environment Institute is to develop practical solutions to difficult problems by bringing together the best people from science, government and the wider community. As of 2014, the Institute consists of five centres, a laboratory and two programs.

== Directorship ==
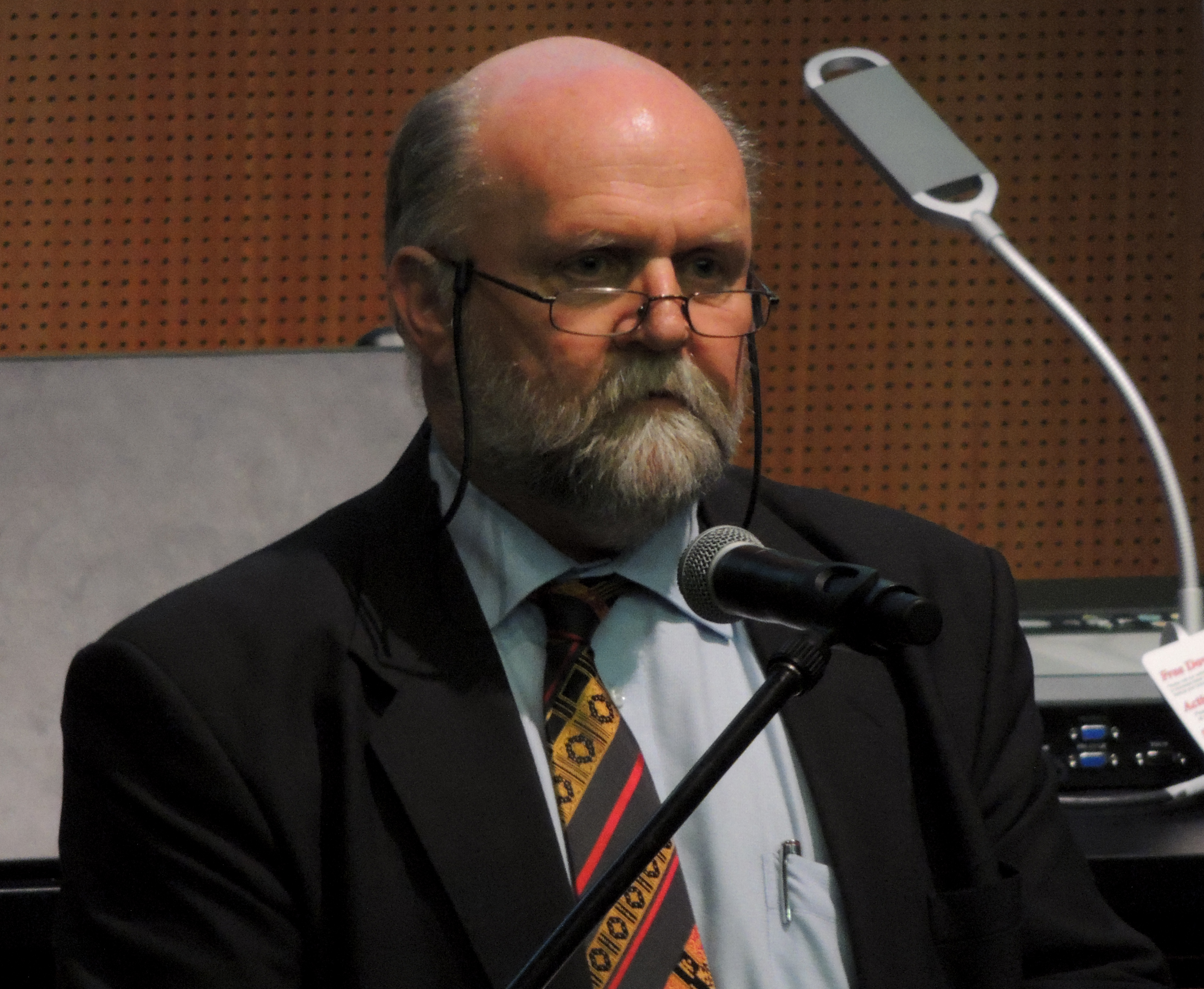
Professor Bob Hill, Director of the Environment Institute (2015)

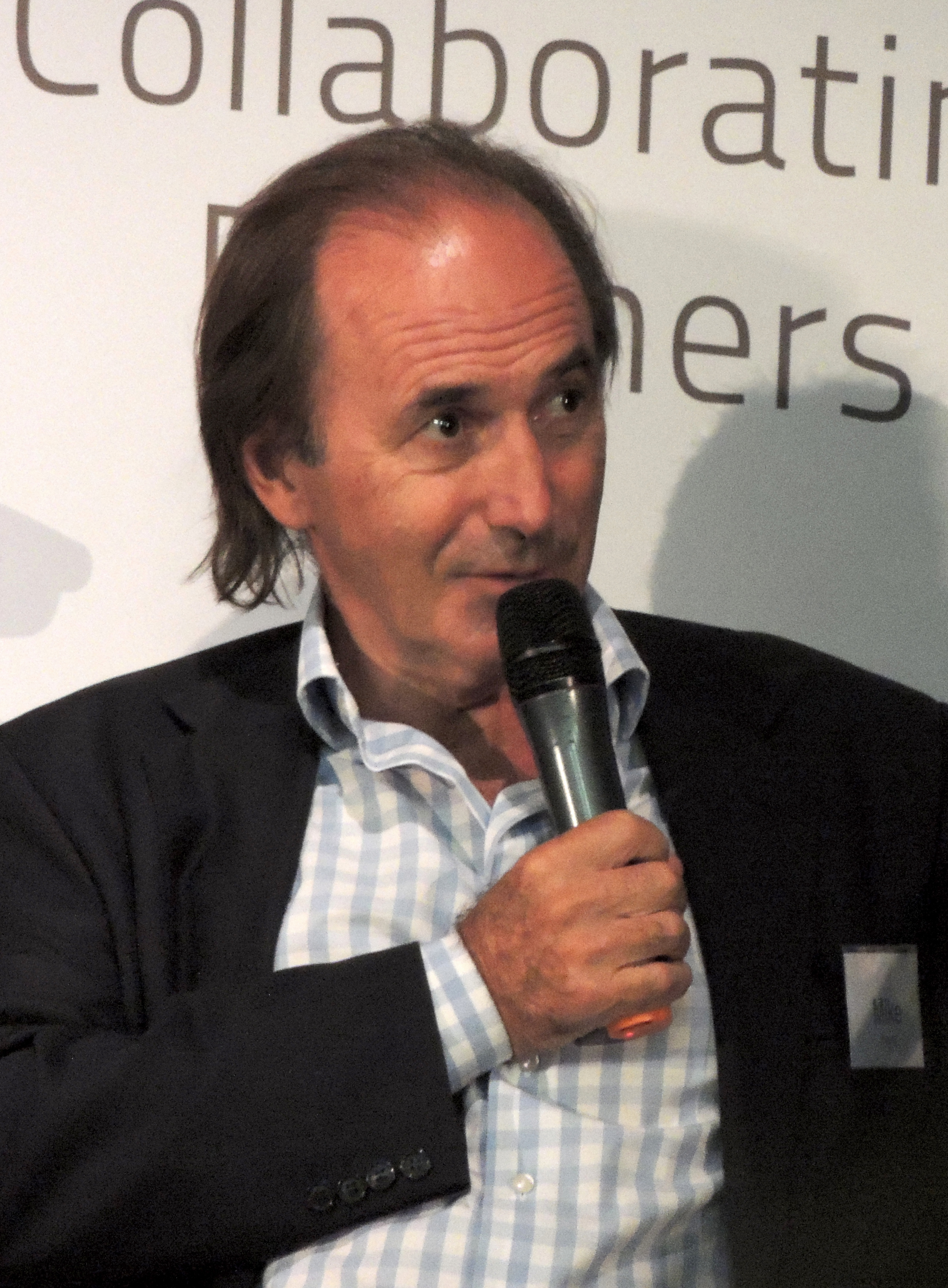
Former Director Mike Young (2014)

The inaugural Executive Director of the Environment Institute was economist Mike Young. He was succeeded by Professor Bob Hill in 2013. Professor Bronwyn Gillanders is the Deputy Director of the institute.

== Notable scientists ==
Professor Barry Brook was the inaugural Sir Hubert Wilkins Chair of Climate Change at the University of Adelaide. He co-directed the Global Ecology Laboratory with Professor Corey Bradshaw who succeeded him as Sir Hubert Wilkins Chair of Climate Change. The Environment Institute's Deputy Director, Professor Bronwyn Gillanders, is also the Director of the Marine Biology program and director of the Spencer Gulf Research & Development Initiative. Phill Cassey leads the national Australian Research Council Industry Laureate research program for ‘Combatting Wildlife and Environmental Crime’.

== Research centres, laboratories & programs ==
- The Australian Centre for Ancient DNA (ACAD) undertakes research on the evolution and environmental change across time through the use of preserved genetic records from human, animal, plant and sedimentary remains.
- The Australian Centre for Evolutionary Biology & Biodiversity investigates the systematics of Australia's flora and fauna.
- The Centre for Energy Technology develops technologies to reduce greenhouse gas and pollutant emissions from existing energy systems while refining alternative energy sources to reduce the effects of climate change.
- The Sprigg Geobiology Centre seeks to understand how organisms both alter and evolve in response to the environment and how they control geologic processes.
- The Water Research Centre investigates the use of water across three broad themes namely, climate change, process management and human health.
- The Global Ecology Laboratory undertakes multidisciplinary research to mitigate carbon emissions and develop adaptive strategies to respond to the anticipated impacts of climate change.
- The Landscape Futures Program investigates how we can sustainably create vibrant and viable landscapes into the future through sound environmental management and monitoring.
- The Marine Biology Program investigates the role of aquatic flora and fauna in the connectivity and ecology of rivers, estuaries, gulfs and open coasts.

== Governance ==
The Environment Institute is governed by a board. As of 2014, its membership includes:

- Carl Binning – BHP
- Mike Brooks – University of Adelaide
- Pauline Gregg – Telstra
- Allan Holmes – Department of Environment, Water & Natural Resources, Government of South Australia
- Steve Morton (chair) – CSIRO

Former board members include:

- Peter Dowd – University of Adelaide
- Paul Duldig – University of Adelaide
- Robert "Bob" Hill – University of Adelaide

== Associated organisations ==
The University of Adelaide has established a number of Research Institutes including:

- Robinson Institute in Reproductive Health
- Institute for Mineral and Energy Resources (IMER)
- Institute for Photonics and Advanced Sensing (IPAS)

== Selected publications ==
- McMahon, C. R.; Bester, M. N.; Hindell, M. A.; Brook, B. W.; Bradshaw, C. J. A. (2009). "Shifting trends: detecting environmentally mediated regulation in long-lived marine vertebrates using time-series data" (PDF). Oecologia. 159 (1): 69–82. Bibcode:2009Oecol.159...69M. doi:10.1007/s00442-008-1205-9. hdl:2263/9030. PMID 18987892. S2CID 9694070.
- Lee, M. S. Y. (2009). "Hidden support from unpromising data sets strongly unites snakes with anguimorph 'lizards'". Journal of Evolutionary Biology. 22 (6): 1308–1316. Bibcode:2009JEBio..22.1308L. doi:10.1111/j.1420-9101.2009.01751.x. PMID 19490385.
- Traill, L. W.; Bradshaw, C. J.; Field, H. E.; Brook, B. W. (2009). "Climate change enhances the potential impact of infectious disease and harvest on tropical waterfowl". Biotropica. 41 (4): 414–423. Bibcode:2009Biotr..41..414T. doi:10.1111/j.1744-7429.2009.00508.x. S2CID 53629497.
- Yang, G.; Brook, B. W.; Bradshaw, C. J. A. (2009). "Predicting the timing and magnitude of tropical mosquito population peaks for maximizing control efficiency". PLOS Neglected Tropical Diseases. 3 (2): e385. doi:10.1371/journal.pntd.0000385. PMC 2638009. PMID 19238191.
- Sodhi, N. S.; Lee, T. M.; Koh, L. P.; Brook, B. W. (2009). "A meta-analysis of the impact of anthropogenic forest disturbance on Southeast Asia's biotas". Biotropica. 41 (1): 103–109. Bibcode:2009Biotr..41..103S. doi:10.1111/j.1744-7429.2008.00460.x.
- Ottwell, K. M.; Donnellan, S. C.; Lowe, A. J.; Paton, D. C. (2009). "Predicting reproductive success of insect- versus bird-pollinated scattered trees in agricultural landscapes". Biological Conservation. 142 (4): 888–898. Bibcode:2009BCons.142..888O. doi:10.1016/j.biocon.2008.12.019.
- Anderson, B. J.; Akcakaya, H. R.; Araujo, M. B.; Fordham, D. A.; Martinez-Meyer, E.; Thuiller, W.; Brook, B. W. (2009). "Dynamics of range margins for metapopulations under climate change". Proceedings of the Royal Society of London. Series B, Biological Sciences. 276 (1661): 1415–1420. doi:10.1098/rspb.2008.1681. PMC 2677226. PMID 19324811.
- Brook, B. W. (2009). "Global warming tugs at trophic interactions". Journal of Animal Ecology. 78 (1): 1–3. Bibcode:2009JAnEc..78....1B. doi:10.1111/j.1365-2656.2008.01490.x. PMID 19120595.
- Bradshaw, C. J. A.; Sodhi, N. S.; Brook, B. W. (2009). "Tropical turmoil: a biodiversity tragedy in progress" (PDF). Frontiers in Ecology and the Environment. 7 (2): 79–87. Bibcode:2009FrEE....7...79B. doi:10.1890/070193. Archived from the original (PDF) on 20 November 2022.
- Bradshaw, C. J. A. (2009). "Flooding policy makers with evidence to save forests". Ambio. 38 (2): 125–126. Bibcode:2009Ambio..38..125B. doi:10.1579/0044-7447-38.2.125. PMID 19431948. S2CID 7113706.
