= Barry Brook (scientist) =

Australian scientist (born 1974)

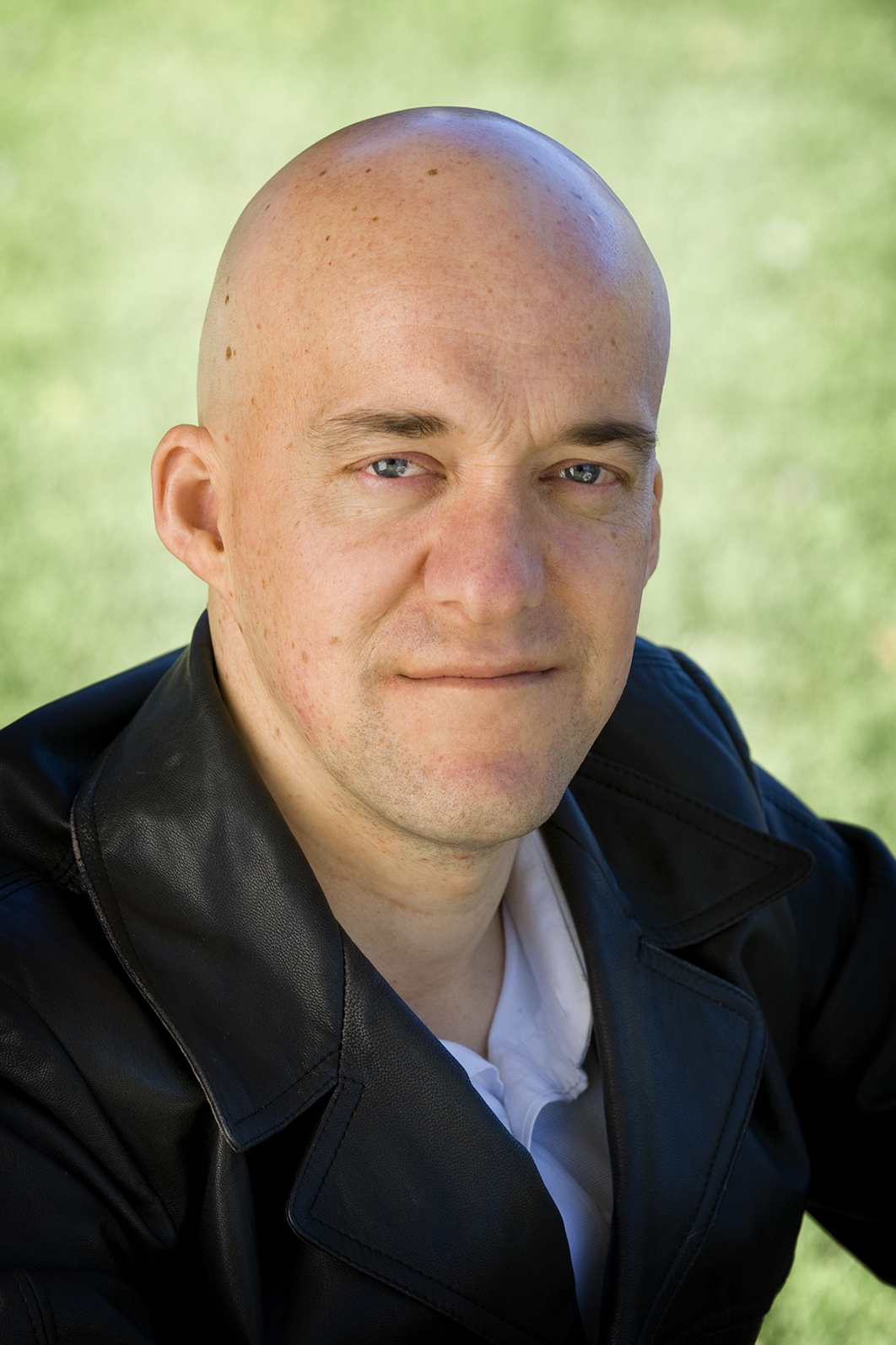
- Prof. Barry W. Brook
- Awards: Australian Laureate Fellowship (2016)
- Scientific career
- Fields: Environment, Energy
- Institutions: University of Tasmania

Barry William Brook (born 28 February 1974 in Melbourne, Australia) is an Australian scientist. He is an ARC Australian Laureate Professor and Chair of Environmental Sustainability at the University of Tasmania in the Faculty of Science, Engineering & Technology. He was formerly an ARC Future Fellow in the School of Earth and Environmental Sciences at the University of Adelaide, Australia, where he held the Sir Hubert Wilkins Chair of Climate Change from 2007 to 2014. He was also Director of Climate Science at the Environment Institute.

== Early life and education ==
Brook attended high school in Coonabarabran, before studying at Macquarie University, Sydney, where he earned a BSc(First Class Honours) in biology and computer science, and a PhD in population viability analysis and conservation biology.

== Career ==
Brook is an ecologist who has published three books and over 300 peer-reviewed scientific papers, is an ISI highly cited researcher, and regularly writes opinion pieces and popular articles for the media. He is known for his work in ecological systems models, conservation biology, paleoecology, sustainable energy and climate change impacts.

He is a strong proponent for nuclear power as a viable carbon-free energy source for wholesale replacement of fossil fuels, especially using generation IV technology that recycles used nuclear fuel, like the Integral Fast Reactor. His most recent book is Why vs Why: Nuclear Power, which is co-authored by Ian Lowe. The two authors present opposing viewpoints.

Brook established the blog Brave New Climate which operated for about five years from 2008. In the aftermath of the Fukushima disaster, Brook argued that the consequences were likely to be minimal, a claim he later retracted.

In 2011, Brook co-authored a "Nuclear Series" of articles for the South Australian Chamber of Mines and Energy with Ben Heard, and Australia's nuclear options, a policy perspective document for CEDA (Committee for Economic Development of Australia). Brook contributed the first of five chapters to the latter, entitled The role of nuclear fission energy in mitigating future carbon emissions. The other chapters were written by fellow advocates Anthony Owen (UCL), Tony Wood (Grattan Institute), Tony Irwin (Engineers Australia) and Tom Quirk (a nuclear physicist).

In an open letter of December 2014 that he led, 75 leading scientists urged environmentalists to set aside their preconceptions about nuclear power. They express their support for an article titled Key role for nuclear energy in global biodiversity conservation., written by Brook, stating that it provided "strong evidence for the need to accept a substantial role for advance nuclear power systems" as part of a range of sustainable energy technologies. "Much as leading climate scientists have recently advocated the development of safe, next-generation nuclear energy systems to combat global climate change ... we entreat the conservation and environmental community to weigh up the pros and cons of different energy sources using objective evidence and pragmatic trade-offs, rather than simply relying on idealistic perceptions of what is 'green'."

Brook's advocacy for nuclear power has been challenged by several critics, including Jim Green of Friends of the Earth. Brook has been similarly critical of anti-nuclear activists and in 2015 described the Greens political party (SA Branch) and Australian Youth Climate Coalition as "sad" and "increasingly irrelevant" after they expressed their opposition to nuclear industrial development.

In February 2015, the South Australian Premier Jay Weatherill announced the Nuclear Fuel Cycle Royal Commission to investigate the potential for an expanded role for the state in all aspects of the nuclear industry (mining, enrichment, reprocessing, waste management and nuclear electricity generation). Brook described the announcement as "real progress." In April 2015, Brook was one of five members appointed to the Expert Advisory Committee of the Royal Commission, along with Ian Lowe, SA Chief Scientist Dr Leanna Read, Timothy Stone CBE and John Carlsson, to provide high-level advice. Commissioner Kevin Scarce said "The members of this Committee have been chosen to ensure that the Commission receives a broad range of advice and reflects the diversity of views that the community holds,"

Brook, along with 17 other environmental scholars, released An Ecomodernist Manifesto in April 2015, which represented a declaration of principles for new environmentalism. The summary of the manifesto says: "We offer this statement in the belief that both human prosperity and an ecologically vibrant planet are not only possible, but also inseparable. By committing to the real processes, already underway, that have begun to decouple human well-being from environmental destruction, we believe that such a future might be achieved. As such, we embrace an optimistic view toward human capacities and the future." It was described by Eduardo Porter of The New York Times as a "...new strategy [that], of course, presents big challenges".

== Memberships ==
Brook has held positions on a number of advisory boards, committees and councils. These include the Australian Research Council, South Australia's Premier's Climate Change Council (2007-2010), the Premier's Science and Research Council, the Nuclear Fuel Cycle Royal Commission, the International Awards Committee of the Global Energy Prize, and the advisory board of the Barbara Hardy Institute at the University of South Australia. He also advocates for the not-for-profit Science Council for Global Initiatives.

== Residences ==
Brook has lived in Melbourne, Bristol (UK), Coonabarabran, Sydney, Darwin, Adelaide, Kyoto (Japan) and currently resides near Hobart, Tasmania.

== Awards and prizes ==
- 2016-21: Australian Laureate Fellowship, Australian Research Council
- 2014-15: Thomson Reuters Highly Cited Researcher, Environment/Ecology
- 2013: Scopus Researcher of the Year, Life Sciences and Biological Sciences
- 2010: Community Science Educator of the Year, Science Excellence awards
- 2007: Cosmos Bright Sparks Award: One of the top 10 young scientists in Australia
- 2007: H.G. Andrewartha Medal: Royal Society of SA. Awarded for outstanding research by a scientist under 40 years (any discipline)
- 2006: Fenner Medal: Australian Academy of Science. Awarded for distinguished research in biology by a scientist under 40 years
- 2006: Edgeworth David Medal: Royal Society of NSW. Awarded for outstanding research by a scientist under 35 years (any discipline)
- 1999: Australian Flora Foundation Prize, Australian Flora Foundation

== Nuclear Power book ==
In the 2010 book Why vs. Why: Nuclear Power Barry Brook and Ian Lowe discuss and articulate the debate about nuclear power. Brook argues that there are seven reasons why people should say "yes" to nuclear power:

- "Because renewable energy and energy efficiency won't solve the energy and climate crises
- Because nuclear fuel is virtually unlimited and packs a huge energy punch
- Because new technology solves the "nuclear waste" problem
- Because nuclear power is the safest energy option
- Because advanced nuclear power will strengthen global security
- Because nuclear power's true costs are lower than either fossil fuels or renewables
- Because nuclear power can lead the "clean energy" revolution"

Lowe argues that there are seven reasons why people should say "no" to nuclear power:

- "Because it is not a fast enough response to climate change
- Because it is too expensive
- Because the need for baseload electricity is exaggerated
- Because the problem of waste remains unresolved
- Because it will increase the risk of nuclear war
- Because there are safety concerns
- Because there are better alternatives"

== Selected bibliography ==
- An Ecomodernist Manifesto. Brook, B.W. and 17 co-authors: ecomodernism.org/manifesto
- Why vs Why: Nuclear Power. Brook, B.W. & Lowe, I. (2010) Pantera Press, ISBN 978-0-9807418-5-8
- Does the terrestrial biosphere have planetary tipping points? Brook, B.W. et al.. Trends Ecol Evol (2013) 28: 396-401
- Synergies among extinction drivers under global change. Brook, B.W., Sodhi, N.S. & Bradshaw, C.J.A. Trends Ecol Evol (2008) 23: 453-460
- Catastrophic extinctions follow deforestation in Singapore. Brook, B.W., Sodhi, N.S., & Ng, P.K.L. Nature (2003) 424: 420–423.
- Predictive accuracy of population viability analysis in conservation biology. Brook, B.W., O'Grady, J.J., Chapman, A.P., Burgman, M.A., Akçakaya, H.R., & Frankham, R. Nature (2000) 404: 385-387
- Southeast Asian Biodiversity in Crisis. Sodhi, N.S., Brook, B.W. (2006) Cambridge University Press, London, UK. ISBN 978-0-521-83930-3, 212 p.
- Tropical Conservation Biology. Sodhi, Navjot S., Barry W. Brook and Corey J. A. Bradshaw (2007) Wiley-Blackwell, ISBN 978-1-4051-5073-6
