= Geoff Russell =

Australian activist

Geoff Russell is an Australian advocate for nuclear power, animal liberation and a published author. His most recent book is GreenJacked!: The derailing of environmental action on climate change. He previously wrote CSIRO Perfidy, a critical analysis of the research behind CSIRO's Total Wellbeing Diet. The book revealed that CSIRO scientists' findings were not accurately represented in the publication.

His articles have been published in newspapers and magazines including The Monthly, Australasian Science, Dissent, The Age and The Advertiser. Russell's writing on both mathematics and nutrition has also been published in peer-reviewed scientific journals. Russell has written occasional articles for New Matilda since 2015 and Brave New Climate, a blog hosted by scientist and nuclear power advocate, Barry Brook since 2008. Russell believes that a reduction in human consumption of red meat and the expansion of nuclear power to displace coal-fired electricity generation are necessary to reduce the impacts of climate change. He argues that a reduction in grazing pressure and stocking intensity of livestock would reduce loss of vegetation and create opportunities for reforestation. Russell believes that "the reasons people fear nuclear are built on obsolete knowledge about DNA and cancer." His opinion pieces regarding an environmental case for nuclear power published in New Matilda have attracted controversy.

As an animal rights advocate, Russell has closely examined research protocols on the Animal Experimentation Ethics Committees at Flinders Medical Centre and Primary Industries and Regions SA (PIRSA). He has also written computer software for transport scheduling and timetabling and he has qualifications in mathematics and philosophy. He is a life member of the RSPCA and a member of Animal Liberation (SA).

In the 2016 Australian federal election, Russell stood as a candidate in the Division of Sturt, representing the Animal Justice Party.
