= Stephen Lincoln =

Stephen Lincoln is a chemistry and physics professor at the University of Adelaide's Environment Institute. His work in molecular science has resulted in over 300 publications in scientific journals and he is the author of Challenged Earth: An Overview of Humanity’s Stewardship of Earth (2006), a book in which he discusses population, water, food, biotechnology, health, energy, climate change and the ozone layer. He has a long-term interest in nuclear power and is a board member and spokesperson for South Australian Nuclear Energy Systems, a private Australian company established in 2014 to explore the feasibility of nuclear industrial development projects in South Australia. Lincoln has been a media spokesperson on nuclear issues in the wake of the Fukushima nuclear disaster and in the lead up to South Australia's Nuclear Fuel Cycle Royal Commission in 2015. His work has been awarded by the Royal Australian Chemical Institute and UNESCO.

== SA Nuclear Energy Systems ==
In February 2015, Lincoln told the Whyalla News of SA Nuclear Energy Systems' proposal to deploy small modular reactors (SMRs) around Eyre Peninsula and construct a uranium enrichment facility in Whyalla. In response to community concerns about safety, Lincoln described the industry as "highly regulated" and said that enrichment plants "don’t pose a radioactive threat." The discussion followed the Government of South Australia's announcement that a Nuclear Fuel Cycle Royal Commission would commence in March 2015, with a report to be delivered to the Government by May 2016.

== Nuclear fusion ==
When Lockheed Martin announced a "major breakthrough" in fusion power in October 2014, Lincoln described the process of nuclear fusion for the Australian Science Media Centre. He expressed some reservations about the alleged break-through, noting that achieving an energy output greater than the required energy input had limited fusion power development since the 1950s. He said "It is unclear from the Lockheed announcement as to whether this very major problem has been overcome. If it has, this would be a remarkable achievement."

== Fukushima nuclear disaster ==
Lincoln expressed concern over the fate of Caesium-137 and Strontium-90 released to the environment during the Fukushima nuclear disaster. In April 2011 he told the Sydney Morning Herald:

"[People] should not venture into the ocean [where the radioactive materials are being released]; they should not eat any fish or seaweed from the ocean. The living species likely to be most affected are shellfish because they are stationary whereas fish that swim may pass through the area and out again. The shellfish such as mussels, oysters and clams certainly accumulate high levels of radioactivity... Basically we should be worried until they can stop the [radiation] leaks and cool the cores and the fuel rods down."
