= Bruce Hundertmark =

- Born: Adelaide, South Australia, Australia
- Occupation(s): Businessman, engineer

Bruce Hundertmark is a South Australian businessman and director of South Australian Nuclear Energy Systems Pty Ltd. Hundertmark travels between his hometown of Adelaide and Indonesia where he heads the drug discovery company PT Indo Bio Products and the molecular-biology-based developer, PT Indobio Diversita Guna. He is a former director of News International, a subsidiary of Rupert Murdoch's News Corporation. He told Rupert Murdoch there was no point in launching Pay TV unless the broadcasts could be protected, and in 1987 Hundertmark backed a small start-up company which developed "Videocrypt" technology. The technology provided a mechanism by which Pay TV broadcasters could restrict their services to subscribers and proved to be of great value to Murdoch's growing media interests. Hundertmark has also worked in the nuclear industry and believes that South Australia should expand on its existing uranium mining and yellowcake production to develop enrichment capacity and ultimately produce nuclear fuel pellets and rods.

== South Australian Nuclear Energy Systems ==
Hundertmark's latest venture intends to develop nuclear energy projects that he believes could possibly attract $20 billion in investment and create more than 100,000 jobs. The company has offices in Tokyo and the USA. The company envisages enriching yellowcake and producing nuclear fuel pellets and rods. The company's directors include former Labor federal MP Bob Catley, Ian Kowalick (former Chief of Staff to Premier John Olsen) and climate scientists Professor Stephen Lincoln and Professor Tom Wigley of the University of Adelaide.

The company has spoken with Christopher Pyne and Don Farrell in efforts to garner political support for further nuclear industrialisation. The company had planned to "hit the ground running" had there been a change of government in South Australia in 2014. Hundertmark has said that he would consider talking with State Treasurer Tom Koutsantonis, who has previously supported nuclear developments in South Australia.

== Corporate interests ==
Hundertmark's former corporate interests and associations include:

- Managing Director of IMFC Limited
- News Datacom Limited in Israel – Pay TV encryption technology company, controlled by Rupert Murdoch
- Chairman of the cancer vaccine developer Lipotek Pty Ltd.
- non-executive director of the antibody producer Neubody Pty, Ltd.
- Director of News International PLC
- Director of Prudential Cornhill Insurance Ltd.
- non-executive director of Biotron Ltd.
- non-executive director of Telesso Technologies Limited (formerly Eiffel Technologies, Ltd.)

== Education ==
Hundertmark completed a Bachelor of Chemical Engineering at the University of Adelaide and also holds a Bachelor of Economics.
