= Grattan Institute =

Australian public policy think tank

Grattan Institute is an Australian public policy think tank, established in 2008. The Melbourne-based institute is non-aligned, defining itself as contributing "to public policy in Australia as a liberal democracy in a globalised economy." It is partly funded by a $34 million endowment, with major contributions from the federal government, the Government of Victoria, the University of Melbourne and BHP. It is named after Grattan St, a street next to Melbourne University.

Grattan Institute currently focuses on six key policy areas: Budgets and Government, Disability, Energy and Climate Change, Health, Education, and Economic Policy. Its programs are chosen with the belief that research into these areas, in line with principles of evidence-based policy can make a demonstrable difference to Australia's public policy. Grattan Institute also makes provision for experts in other fields to work under its umbrella.

== History ==
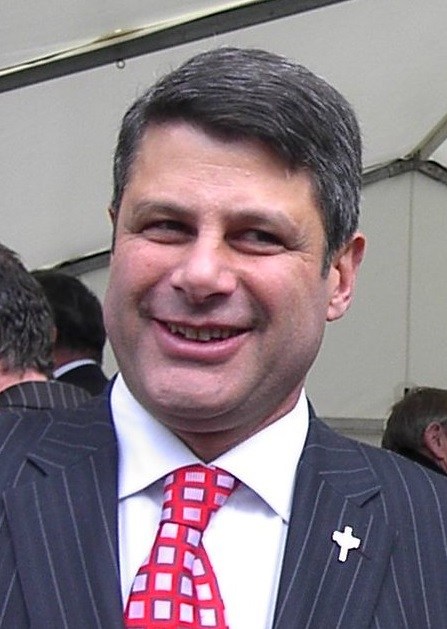
Steve Bracks

Grattan Institute began with pressure from senior figures in the Victorian Public Service, academic institutions, and broader business and non-government leaders, who believed that Australian political life lacked a heavyweight independent think tank. Through the course of 2005 this idea was fleshed out by several people in the Victorian Department of Premier and Cabinet, including discussions with a number of Australia's corporate leaders. At the end of 2005 the Victorian Premier, Steve Bracks, met with the Federal Treasurer Peter Costello to define the theme for the think tank: Australia as a liberal democracy in a globalised economy. The phrase has since been enshrined in the Constitution of Grattan Institute.

Links between the University of Melbourne, Victorian Government and corporate Australia, along with a supportive report from McKinsey & Company, were the basis for then Victorian Premier Bracks and Treasurer John Brumby in early 2007 to promise significant Victorian Government funding for the idea. Melbourne University was also asked to assist.

In April 2008, Commonwealth and Victorian Governments announced matching funding, along with support in kind from the University of Melbourne. Commitments followed soon after from BHP and National Australia Bank. Grattan receives money from its endowment supporters and affiliates, which include Susan McKinnon Foundation, Scanlon Foundation, The Myer Foundation, Origin Energy Foundation, Third Link Growth Fund, Cuffe Family Foundation, Medibank Private, Trawalla Foundation, Wesfarmers, Maddocks, McKinsey & Company, Ashurst, Corrs Chambers Westgarth, Urbis, and Westpac.

Grattan Institute was incorporated in November 2008, and its founding chief executive, John Daley, commenced in January 2009. Upon his departure in July 2020, Danielle Wood worked as Grattan Institute CEO until she was appointed to chair the Productivity Commission in November 2023. Grattan Institute's third chief executive, Aruna Sathanapally, commenced in February 2024.

== Executive ==
Executive (as of August 2024):

CEO

- Aruna Sathanapally

Program heads

- Health – Peter Breadon
- Energy and Climate Change – Tony Wood
- Education and Skills – Elizabeth Knight
- Economic Prosperity and Democracy – Aruna Sathanapally
- Housing and Economic Security – vacant
- Disability – Sam Bennett

== Board of directors ==
Board members (as of April 2025) were:

- Lindsay Maxsted (chair)
- Carol Austin
- Andrew Cuthbertson
- Kathryn Fagg
- Ian Marshman
- Jillian Segal
- Michael Traill
- Michael Wesley
