= Tony Irwin =

Australian nuclear engineer

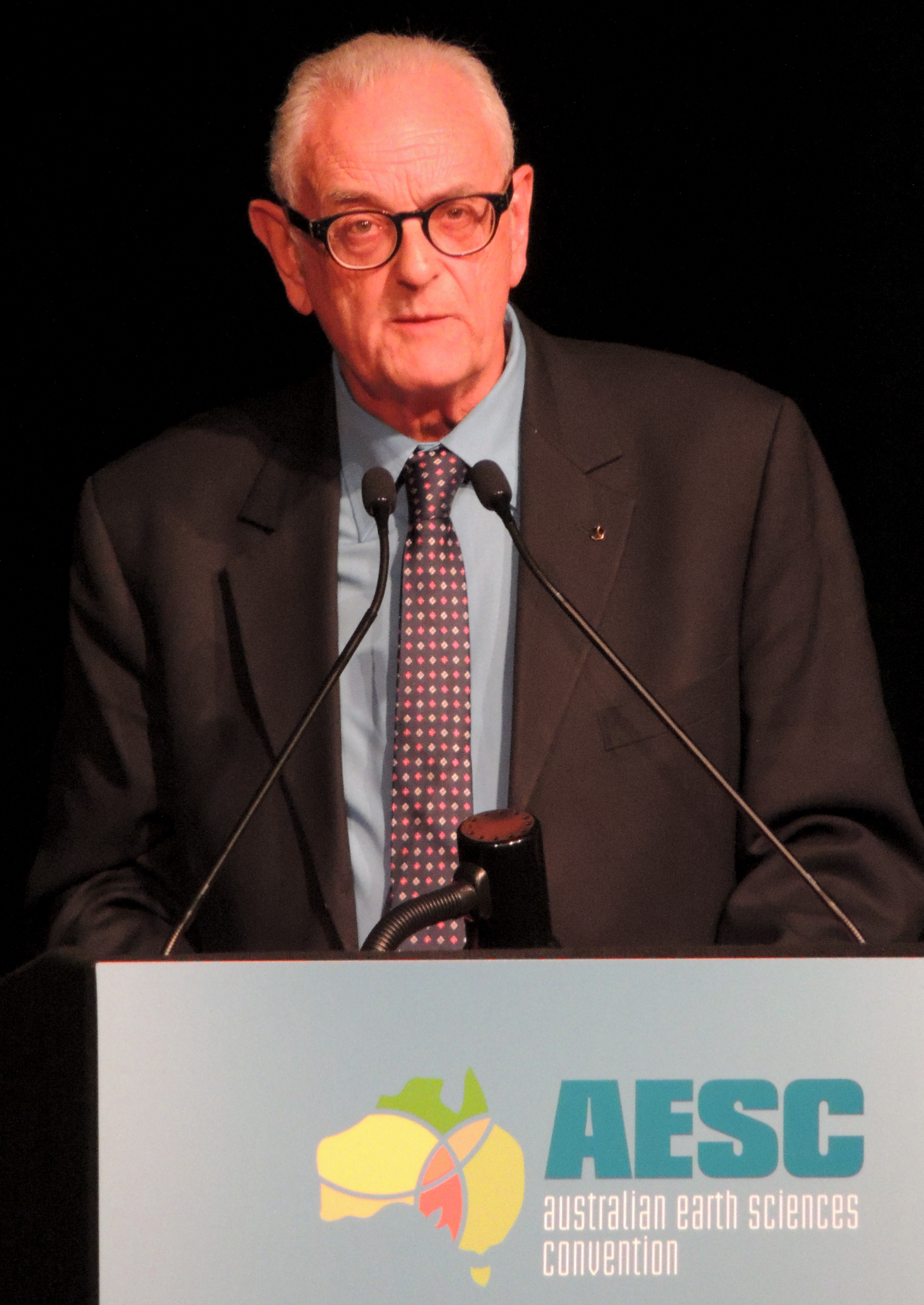
Tony Irwin speaking at Australian Earth Sciences Convention 2016, Adelaide

Tony Irwin is an Australian nuclear engineer and technical director of Australian company, SMR Nuclear Technology. For three decades he worked commissioning and operating nuclear reactors in the UK for British Energy (formerly the Central Electricity Generating Board). He emigrated to Australia in 1999 and took a position with the Australian Nuclear Science and Technology Organisation (ANSTO), where he remained for ten years. Irwin chairs the Nuclear Engineering Panel of Engineers Australia and lectures at the Australian National University and University of Sydney on nuclear science. Irwin has a degree in electrical power engineering.

== Nuclear power advocacy ==
Irwin is an advocate for nuclear power in Australia and has recommended the deployment of small modular reactors, provided that legislation can be changed to allow for it. In 2014 he told the media:

"Small modular reactors with their natural safety based on passive safety systems using gravity, natural circulation and pressurised tanks, represent a game-changer that is particularly suitable for Australian conditions."

He has argued in Mining Australia that climate change should lead Australia to reconsider nuclear power as an alternative to burning fossil fuels to generate electricity.

He has featured in media reports on nuclear technology and provided commentary to the Australian Science Media Centre in response to the Fukushima nuclear disaster. He has given public presentations and lectures on SMRs and nuclear power, including some at which opposing viewpoints were presented by anti-nuclear advocates such as Ian Lowe.

In 2011 Irwin contributed a chapter on small modular reactors to Australia's nuclear options, a policy perspective document for the Committee for Economic Development of Australia.

== Memberships ==
Irwin is a member of the Institution of Engineers Australia and of the UK Institution of Engineering and Technology, a fellow of the Australian Institute of Energy, and chairman of the Nuclear Engineering Panel of the Sydney division of Engineers Australia. He is a member of ARPANSA's Nuclear Safety Committee.
