= Rowan Hundertmark =

Australian rules football umpire

Personal information
- Full name: Rowan Hundertmark

Umpiring career
Years	League	Role	Games
2015–2017	AFL	Field umpire	1

Rowan Hundertmark is an Australian rules football umpire who has officiated in the Australian Football League.

Before umpiring in the AFL, he umpired in the South Australian National Football League, officiating in the 2016 Grand Final. He was appointed to the AFL rookie list in 2015 at the latest, and made his debut, as an emergency umpire replacing an injured Craig Fleer, in a match between Adelaide and Melbourne in Round 8, 2017. However, Hundertmark suffered a leg injury and did not finish the game, so only two umpires officiated the remainder of the contest. He left the AFL rookie list at the end of the 2017 season.
