= Sir Hubert Wilkins Chair of Climate Change =

Professorship at the University of Adelaide

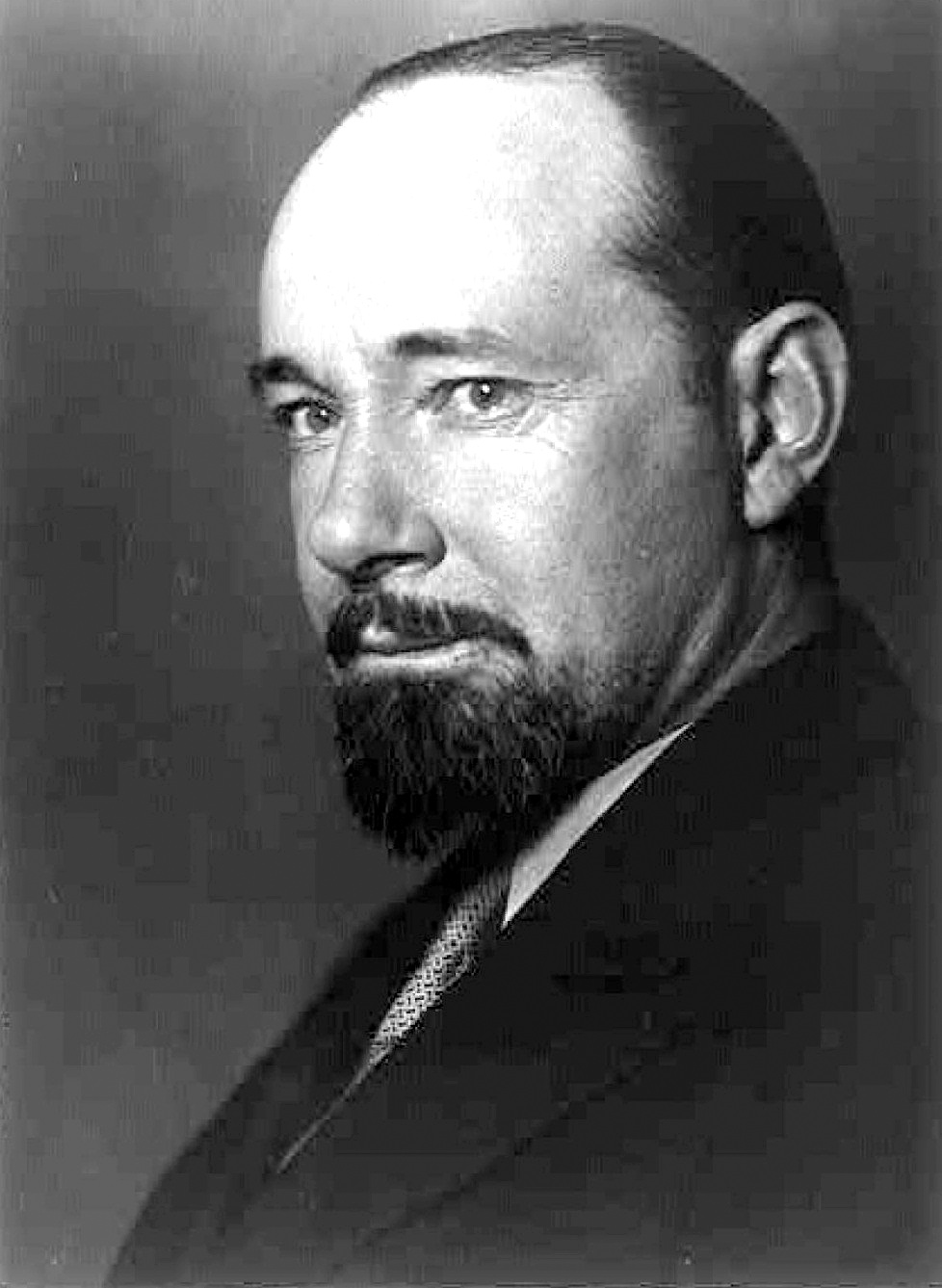
Sir Hubert Wilkins 1931

The Sir Hubert Wilkins Chair of Climate Change was a special appointment made at the University of Adelaide and funded by the Government of South Australia. It was established with funding for four years, beginning in 2006–07. The chair's role is to advise government, industry, and the community on how to tackle climate change. The chair is also tasked to draw together expertise in climate change from across the university. The foundation appointee to the position was Professor Barry Brook who held the position for eight years until December 2014. From 1 January 2015 to 15 January 2017, the position was held by Professor Corey J. A. Bradshaw. It is unknown if the position will continue.

== Nomenclature ==
The chair's namesake, Sir Hubert Wilkins, was a South Australian researcher who studied weather and its impacts on people. Sir Hubert was also concerned about the loss of native flora and fauna during an era when few Australians were concerned with conservation.
