= Tony Wood (Australian businessman) =

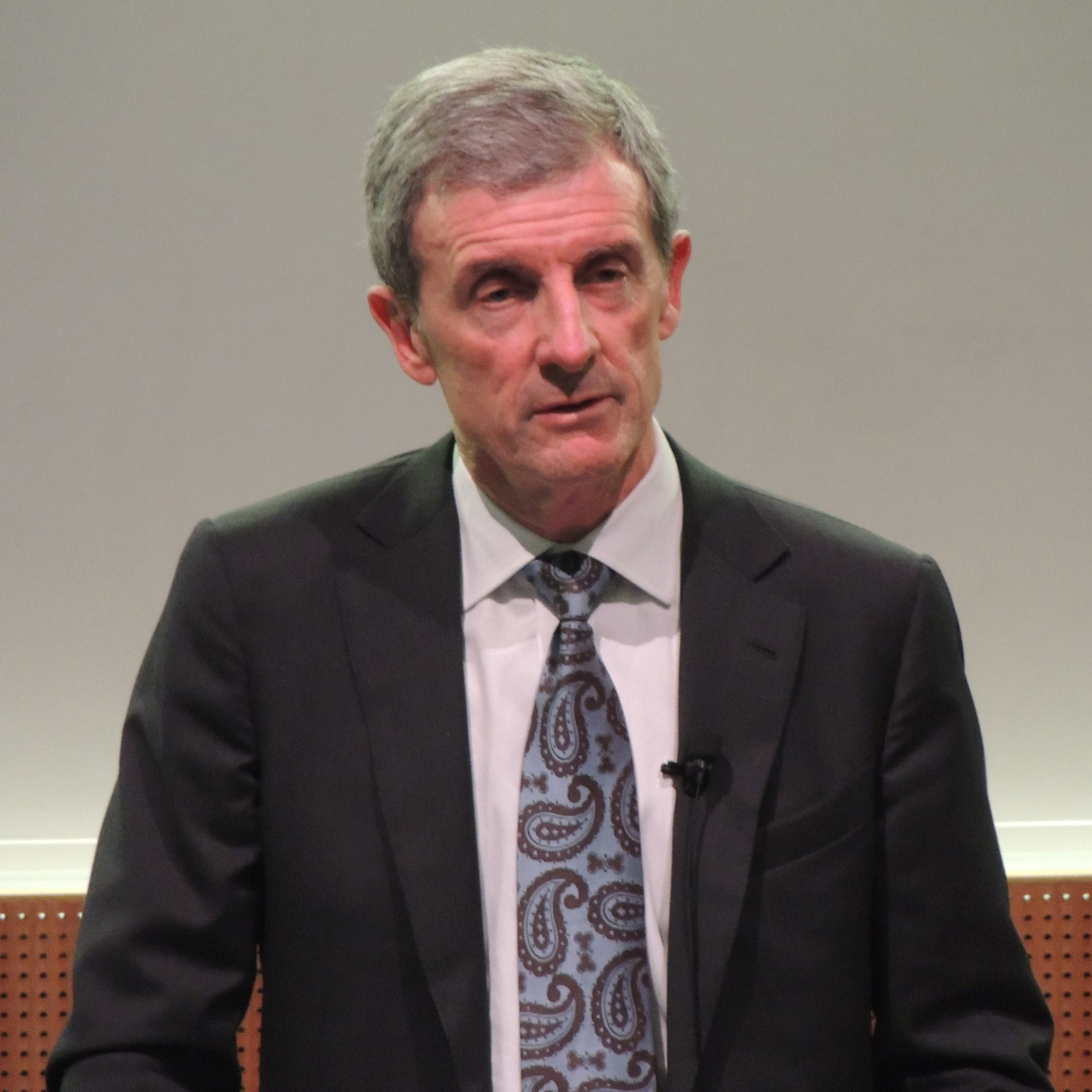
Tony Wood, Grattan Institute's Energy Program Director speaks at the University of Adelaide (2014)

Tony Wood is an Australian businessman and Energy Program Director at the Grattan Institute. He has become a prominent spokesperson for the institute since his appointment in 2011, and has written over 70 articles for The Conversation related to energy, climate change and energy policy. From 2002 to 2008 he was executive general manager of Origin Energy, where he held executive positions for a total of 14 years. Wood has declared interests as a shareholder of BHP Billiton and Origin Energy.

== Career ==
Wood has worked in the energy, transport, chemical and fertiliser industries. He contributed to the Garnaut Climate Change Review in 2008 and worked with the Clinton Foundation from 2009 to 2014 as director of its Clean Energy programme. He was appointed director of the energy programme at the Grattan Institute in mid-2011, and has represented it in publications, on radio and at public forum. He was on the executive board of the Committee for Melbourne and the Green Energy Taskforce of the Government of the Northern Territory. He has also worked as a financial advisor for PwC and has served as Chairperson of the Energy Retailers Association of Australia.

His areas of interest include natural gas, carbon capture and storage, solar power and nuclear power.

Wood was appointed a Member of the Order of Australia in the 2018 Australia Day Honours for his "significant service to conservation and the environment, particularly in the areas of energy policy, climate change, and sustainability". He was elected a Fellow of the Australian Academy of Technological Sciences & Engineering in 2019.

== Nuclear power ==
In 2011, Wood contributed a chapter on "Nuclear power in Australia's energy future" to Australia's nuclear options, a policy perspective document for the Committee for Economic Development of Australia. He argued that the need to reduce carbon emissions in order to limit the impacts of climate change should bring into consideration the possibility of nuclear power in Australia. In February 2012, Wood told interviewer Andrew Charlton that "the cost or acceptability of nuclear energy would remain a challenge in Australia." Wood's publications on The Conversation declare him to be a shareholder in BHP Billiton (a resources company engaged in uranium mining and a Foundation Partner of the Grattan Institute).

== Solar power ==
In 2015, Wood told the ABC that the environmental benefits achieved by Australia's take-up of solar photovoltaic panels had come at great cost to Australian taxpayers- a net cost of "about $9 billion". He said "in the time that we had could have done a lot better, with that money, or we could have actually reduced greenhouse gas emissions a lot more cheaply... and then we could have been moving onto a different future for solar." "Solar with batteries in the future might be a much better way." John Grimes responded in defence of solar panel deployment, stating that the report Wood was referring to was "cherry-picking", and was "designed to cast solar PV in the worst possible light."

== Education ==
Tony Wood has a postgraduate diploma in business administration from the Queensland Institute of Technology and a master's degree in Science (Physical chemistry) from the University of Queensland.
