= Nuclear industry in South Australia =

The nuclear industry in South Australia is focused on uranium mining, milling and the export of uranium oxide concentrate for use in the production of nuclear fuel for nuclear power plants. The state is home to the world's largest known single deposit of uranium, which is worked by BHP at the Olympic Dam mine.

Contaminated legacy sites exist at Maralinga and Emu Field, where nuclear weapons tests were conducted in the 1950s and 1960s; and at former uranium mines and milling sites. Nuclear waste is also stored by the CSIRO at Woomera. In 2016, the Nuclear Fuel Cycle Royal Commission recommended that South Australia consider establishing a facility for nuclear waste storage (including developing a repository for spent nuclear fuel) and repealing prohibitions which currently prevent future nuclear industrial development nationally.

In 2017, a site near Kimba on Eyre Peninsula was selected for Australia's national radioactive waste management facility, where domestically generated nuclear waste would be stored. Construction was planned for late 2022. Selection of this site has generated an environmental conflict, because the Barngarla people who claim the site as their traditional land were not consulted or included in the vote approving the facility. Barngarla elders have raised legal challenges to the site selection.

Advocates for an expanded nuclear industry in South Australia have included former Prime Ministers from both Labor and Liberal parties.

== Uranium mining ==
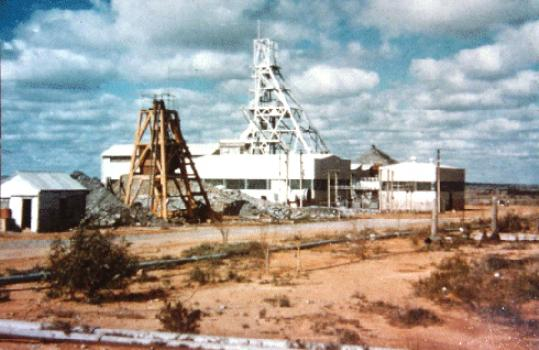
Radium Hill uranium mine (1954)

Uranium mining has occurred in South Australia, since the early 20th century, when radium was the target mineral in uranium-bearing ore found at Radium Hill and Mount Gee / Mount Painter. During the Cold War, the Playford government facilitated the further development of the Radium Hill uranium mine and the associated Port Pirie uranium treatment complex. These closed in the early 1960s after a seven-year contract of supply had been fulfilled. In the 1970s, the discovery of a massive uranium-bearing IOCG orebody near Roxby Downs led to the eventual opening of the Olympic Dam mine in 1988. In the 2000s, the sector expanded to include in-situ leach mining operations at Beverley, Four Mile and Honeymoon. As of May 2016, Beverley and Honeymoon mines are in care and maintenance mode owing to weak uranium prices in the wake of the Fukushima nuclear disaster.

Exploration for uranium in South Australia reached a record high in 2006 with forty companies exploring for the mineral.

=== Uranium export ===
Uranium mined in South Australia is exported, where it is used in the production of nuclear fuel for use in nuclear power plants. In 2013, uranium oxide concentrate produced in South Australia was being exported to Britain, France, Sweden, Finland, Belgium, Canada and the United States. In 2011, South Australian Premier Jay Weatherill expressed his support for exporting uranium to India, despite its status as a non-signatory to the Nuclear Non-Proliferation Treaty. By December 2015, no further barriers remained preventing such trade.

== Nuclear waste storage ==
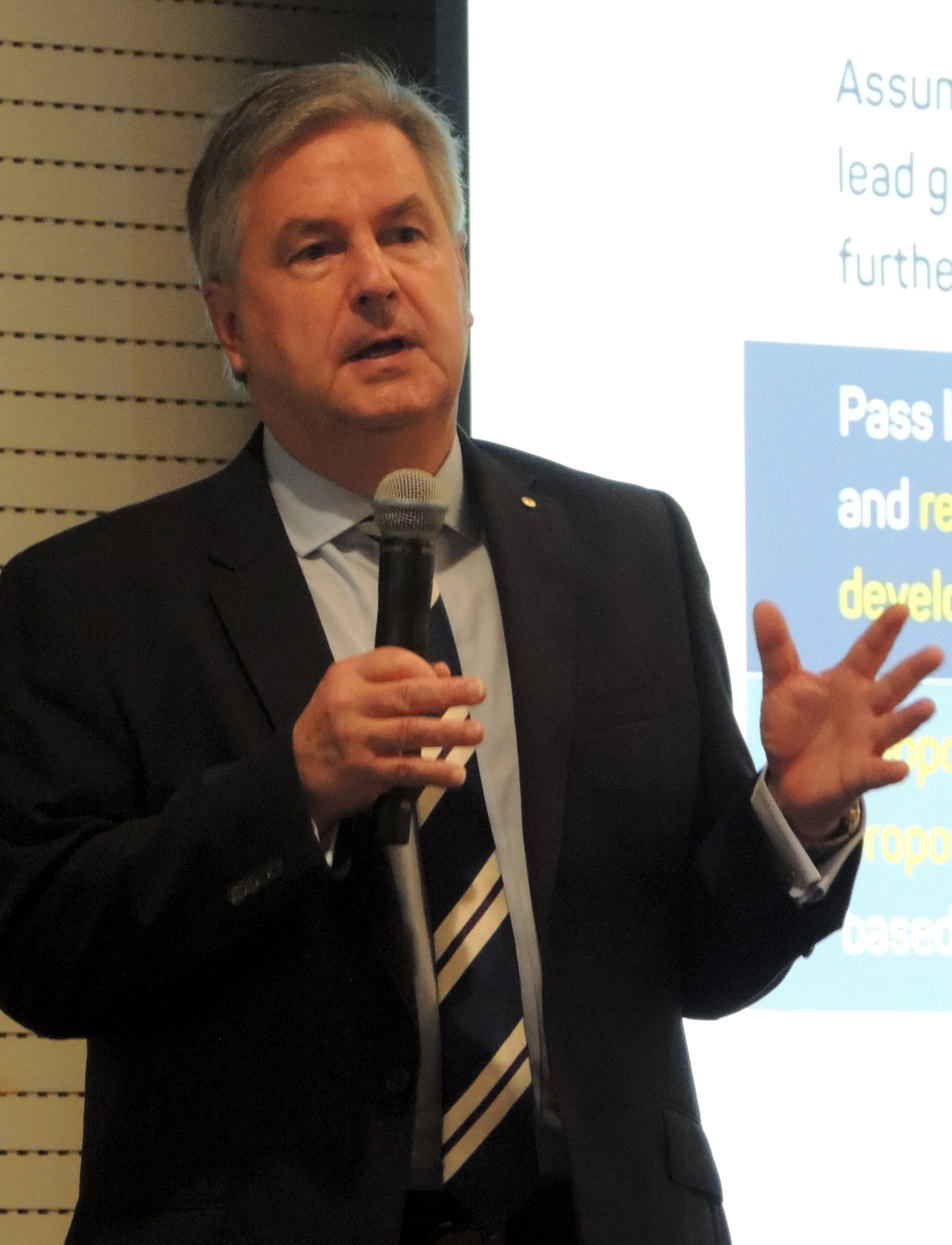
Kevin Scarce in Adelaide (2016)

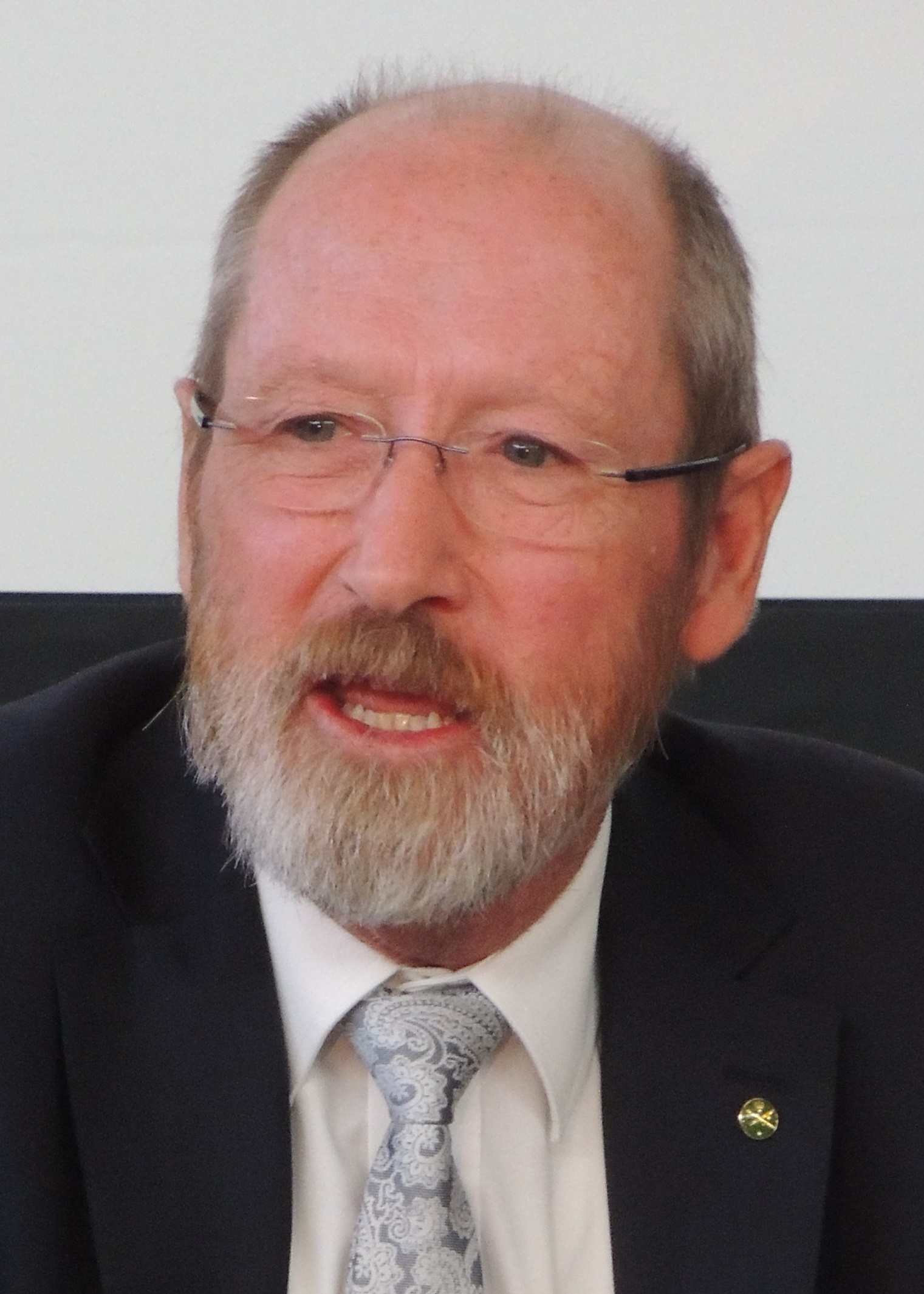
Rowan Ramsey (2015)

Concentrations of nuclear waste in South Australia exist in the tailings ponds at the Olympic Dam mine, at the site of the former Port Pirie uranium treatment works and in the tailings block at the former Radium Hill mine. The CSIRO operates a nuclear waste storage facility at Woomera in the state's far north. Studies and debates about where to store Australia's radioactive waste have been ongoing since the 1980s.

The Howard government made unsuccessful attempts to establish nuclear waste storage facilities in South Australia between 1998 and 2004. This proposition was revived during the LNP coalition Abbott, Turnbull, and Morrison governments from 2013 to 2022. Various sites on Aboriginal lands proposed between 1998 and 2016 have been contested by Indigenous people and denounced as forms of environmental racism.

Recommendations by the Nuclear Fuel Cycle Royal Commission in 2016 ultimately resulted in a site selection near Kimba on Eyre Peninsula.

=== National Radioactive Waste Management Facility ===
The Kimba site has been contested by Barngarla people who claim the site as their traditional land and were not consulted or included in the vote approving the facility. Barngarla elders have raised legal challenges to the site selection.

A seven-year-long consultation process preceded the official selection of a site at Napandee, near Kimba in South Australia for a future National Radioactive Waste Management Facility.

Prospective sites were voluntarily nominated by their owners, though Indigenous people were left out of the process. Domestically produced radioactive waste, and repatriated, reprocessed spent nuclear fuel from Australia's research reactors at Lucas Heights is intended to be stored there, once constructed. A prospective nuclear waste storage site at Barndioota was announced in 2015. The property was owned by Grant Chapman, and the traditional owners are the Adnyamathanha. Two other candidate sites were named near Kimba on Eyre Peninsula.

The Kimba sites are located in the federal electorate of Grey, for which Rowan Ramsey is the sitting member. Ramsey publicly advocated for the establishment of nuclear waste storage facilities in South Australia, and has stated that he would be comfortable storing it on his own property. Ramsay did not nominate his own property for the project after receiving advice that it would constitute a conflict of interest. Opinion on the benefits and risks associated with establishing a facility has divided the township of Kimba.

Opponents of the establishment of a new national facility for domestically produced nuclear waste believe that such waste should be stored long-term at Lucas Heights, where much of the waste was and continues to be generated. Spokespeople for the opposition include Jim Green of Friends of the Earth and David Sweeney of the Australian Conservation Foundation.

=== Prospective deep geological storage ===
Spent nuclear fuel is considered to be high-level nuclear waste, and requires isolation from the environment, ideally in a facility deep underground. The prospect of storing nuclear waste in the underground tunnels of the Olympic Dam mine has been speculated upon by opinion writers, politicians and the community.

Support for the development of new nuclear waste storage facilities in South Australia was expressed by the Committee for Adelaide on 6 May 2016.

The Nuclear Fuel Cycle Royal Commission's final report, which was delivered to the Governor of South Australia on 6 May 2016 recommended the consideration of the establishment of a repository for imported spent nuclear fuel in South Australia. That would require deep, underground storage to isolate the waste from the environment. The report was released in full on 9 May 2016.

The report was put before a Citizens Jury, which ultimately voted not to proceed with investigating the prospect of importing spent nuclear fuel for storage and disposal in South Australia. In December 2016, a group of prominent citizens signed an open letter expressing an opposing view. It stated:

"We, the undersigned, call on South Australia’s elected representatives of all parties to continue to explore this opportunity. We request further investigations into issues that a) are essential for better understanding project feasibility and b) could be investigated at relatively low cost. We call for partnership between the State Government and relevant Federal Government agencies to formally meet with prospective client nations in order to gain greater certainty and ensure we are fully informed as to the nature of this opportunity."

Signatories were: Fraser Ainsworth, Rob Chapman, Tim Cooper, Di Davidson, Colin Dunsford, Geoff Day, Robert Gerard, Ian Gould, Kathy Gramp, Jim Hazel, Mike Heard, David Klingberg AO, Theo Maras, Karlene Maywald, Jim McDowell, Mike Miller, Tanya Monro, Creagh O'Connor, Leanna Read, Karen Reynolds, Richard Ryan, Antony Simpson, Michael Terlet, Meera Verma, Graham Walters, and Stephen Young.

A similar letter was published in March 2017 on Ben Heard's website, Bright New World. Many of the former signatories signed again, and the following new names were added: Rick Allert AO, Amanda Blair, Corey Bradshaw, Mark Butcher, Matt Clemow, Greg Clothier, Brian Cunningham, Colin Goodall, John Heard AM, Mark Malcolm, Hon. Ian McLachlan AO, Carolyn Mitchell, Craig Mudge AO, Goran Roos, Raymond Spencer, Lissa Van Camp, Jodie Van Deventer, Hon. Trish White, Paul Willis and Stephen Yarwood.

In March 2017, it was estimated that $30 million would need to be spent to manage nuclear waste stored at Woomera. Barrels containing the wastes were found to be rusting and deteriorating.

== Nuclear submarines ==
Profile of the Barracuda type submarine, with her pump-jet propeller and X-shaped stern planes.

In 2021, the Morrison government announced that Australia would acquire a fleet of nuclear-propelled submarines, replacing a prior agreement with French contractor DCNS to build a fleet of diesel-propelled submarines.

The prospect of constructing nuclear submarines in South Australia had been raised on various occasions during the 2010s. In 2011, the CEO of Defence SA, Andrew Fletcher expressed his personal view that it would be unlikely for Australia's Future Submarine project to commit to producing nuclear powered submarines, unless a nuclear industry was established in Australia beforehand, or if their production was outsourced offshore. He expressed his belief that a commitment to 12 diesel-powered submarines was more likely. Authors from UCL Australia have written opinion pieces and produced research papers on the topic. In 2015, former Rolls-Royce nuclear engineer and submarine expert Steve Ludlam was appointed to the Defence SA Advisory Board.

In 2016, the contract for the supply of Australia's Future Submarines Project was awarded to French company Direction des Constructions Navales Services (DCNS), and the Barracuda-class submarine was selected. The existing Barracuda-class submarine was a nuclear powered submarine, but the Australian Government sought a modified design with diesel-powered pump jet propulsion. The other bidders which were competing for the tender did not make nuclear powered submarines. Australian Cabinet ministers have discussed the merits of keeping the nuclear propulsion option open by choosing the Barracuda-class design and LNP coalition governments are supportive of nuclear industrial development in Australia.

in 2017, former Australian Prime Minister Tony Abbott spoke of the merits of considering nuclear propulsion for Australia's Future Submarine Project, claiming various advantages over diesel propulsion, including range and speed.

In 2021, the AUKUS security pact was signed as a trilateral agreement between Australia, the US and the UK. The agreement with the French was abandoned, in favour of developing a fleet of nuclear-powered submarines with American and British technology and expertise. The new, nuclear fleet will be designed and developed in collaboration with AUKUS partners with further details expected to be announced in 2023.

== Nuclear weapons ==
A series of British nuclear weapons tests were conducted at Maralinga and Emu Field during the 1950s and early 1960s. Land remains contaminated at these sites and access is restricted.

Australia has no domestic nuclear weapons nor the capability to develop them. Australia is allied with countries which do maintain nuclear arsenals. As of 2016 the Liberal–National Coalition does not support a prospective ban on the possession of nuclear weapons, while the Australian Labor Party and Australian Greens do.

== Potential expansion ==
In 2015, a Nuclear Fuel Cycle Royal Commission was initiated by the Government of South Australia. It was tasked with investigating opportunities and risks associated with potential expansion of the state's role in the nuclear fuel cycle. Commissioner Kevin Scarce delivered its final report to the Governor of South Australia on 6 May 2016. The commission's final report recommended the repeal of prohibitions preventing nuclear industrial development in Australia, including the legalisation of nuclear power generation. The report recommended the establishment of a facility to store international stockpiled spent nuclear fuel and the consideration of a nuclear fuel leasing scheme to accompany it. The latter was also described by the commission as a potential enabler for future enrichment and fuel processing activities, though such further processing developments were deemed to not be feasible within the next decade. The establishment of nuclear power generation in South Australia was also deemed inappropriate given the state's high penetration of solar and wind power.

=== 2016–17 ===
The Government of South Australia allocated $3.6 million to the Department of the Premier and Cabinet for 2016–17 "to enable the government to engage with the community to develop an informed response to the Nuclear Fuel Cycle Royal Commission Final Report."

==== Citizens' Jury process ====
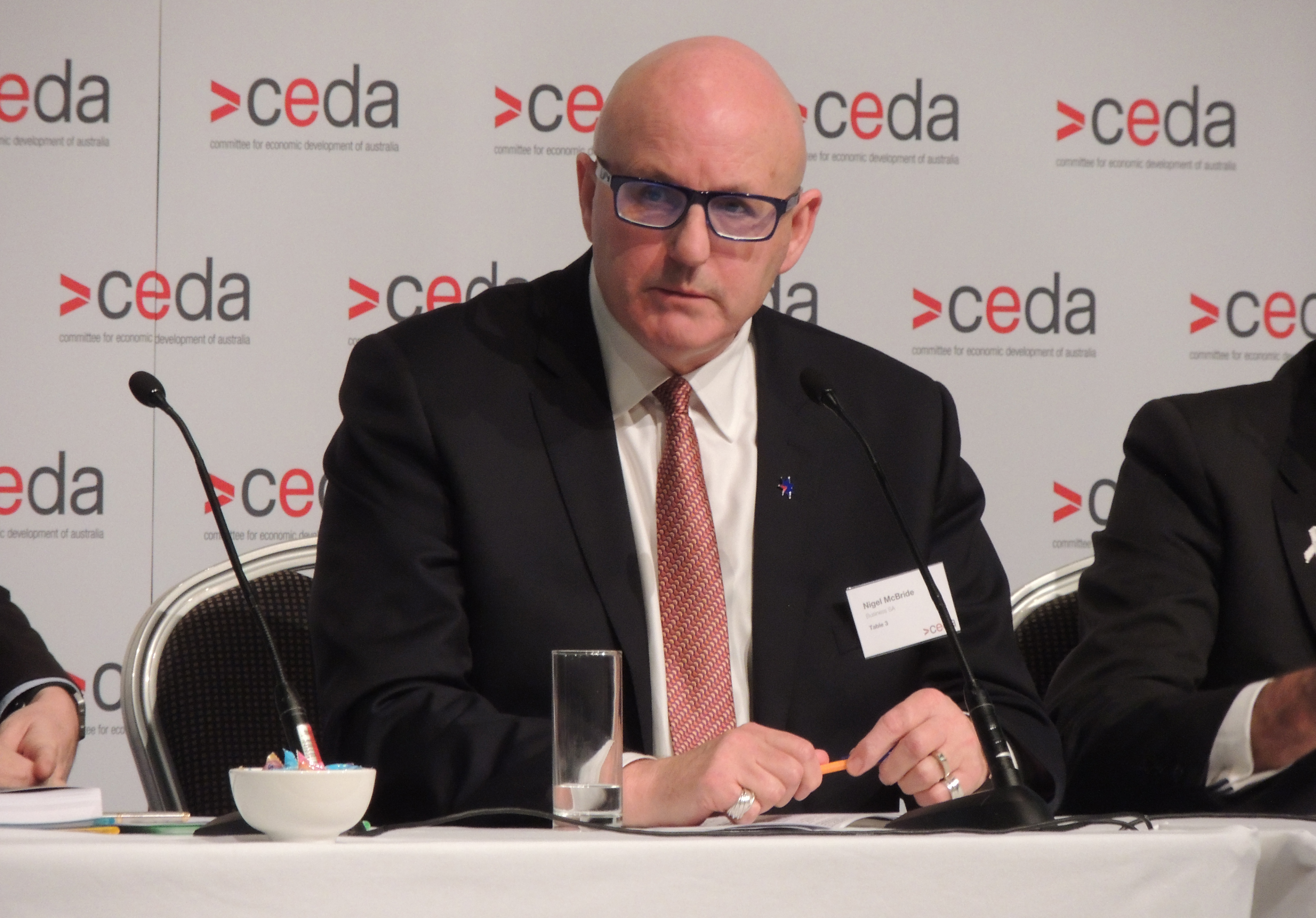
Nigel McBride, Business SA

Following the conclusion of the Nuclear Fuel Cycle Royal Commission, the Department of the Premier and Cabinet established a "YourSAy nuclear?" website, advertising campaign and Citizens' Jury process. Managed by the New Democracy Foundation, the Citizens' Jury process randomly invited 25,000 South Australians to participate by post. Of those who accepted the invitation, a total of 350 jurors will be chosen to meet and discuss the Nuclear Fuel Cycle Royal Commission's final report, help produce a simplified version for further discussion, and ultimately express their support or rejection of its various recommendations. South Australian company DemocracyCo won the contract to facilitate the first Citizens' Jury. DemocracyCo spokesperson Emily Jenke described the process and its result as "one of the pieces the Premier and Government will be using to inform their thinking".

The first Citizens' Jury was composed of 50 people. They were provided with the Nuclear Fuel Cycle Royal Commission's final report and heard from a panel whose members are listed below.

| Member's name | Primary position held | Other relevant affiliations |
|---|---|---|
| Jason Kuchel | CEO of South Australian Chamber of Mines & Energy | Member of Minerals and Energy Advisory Council |
| Simon Longstaff | Founder of The Ethics Centre | Financial supporters of The Ethics Centre include BHP and Santos |
| Nigel McBride | CEO of Business SA | Member of the State Advisory Council of the Committee for Economic Development of Australia (CEDA), former lawyer with MinterEllison |
| Michael Penniment | Director of Radiation oncology at the Royal Adelaide Hospital | Employee of the Government of South Australia |
| Leanna Read | Chief Scientist of SA | Member of Nuclear Fuel Cycle Royal Commission Expert Advisory and Medical Expert Advisory committees, member of the Economic Development Board of South Australia, Fellow of the Australian Academy of Technological Sciences and Engineering and Chair of the South Australian Science Council |
| Kelly-Anne Saffin | CEO of Northern and Yorke Regional Development Australia | RDA is funded by the Government of Australia and the Government of South Australia |
| Keith Thomas | CEO of SA Native Title Services | SA Native Title Services is funded by the Government of South Australia |
| Craig Wilkins | CEO of Conservation Council of South Australia | Wilkins is former Chief of Staff of Australian Greens MLC Mark Parnell. The Conservation Council of South Australia receives funding from the Government of South Australia. |

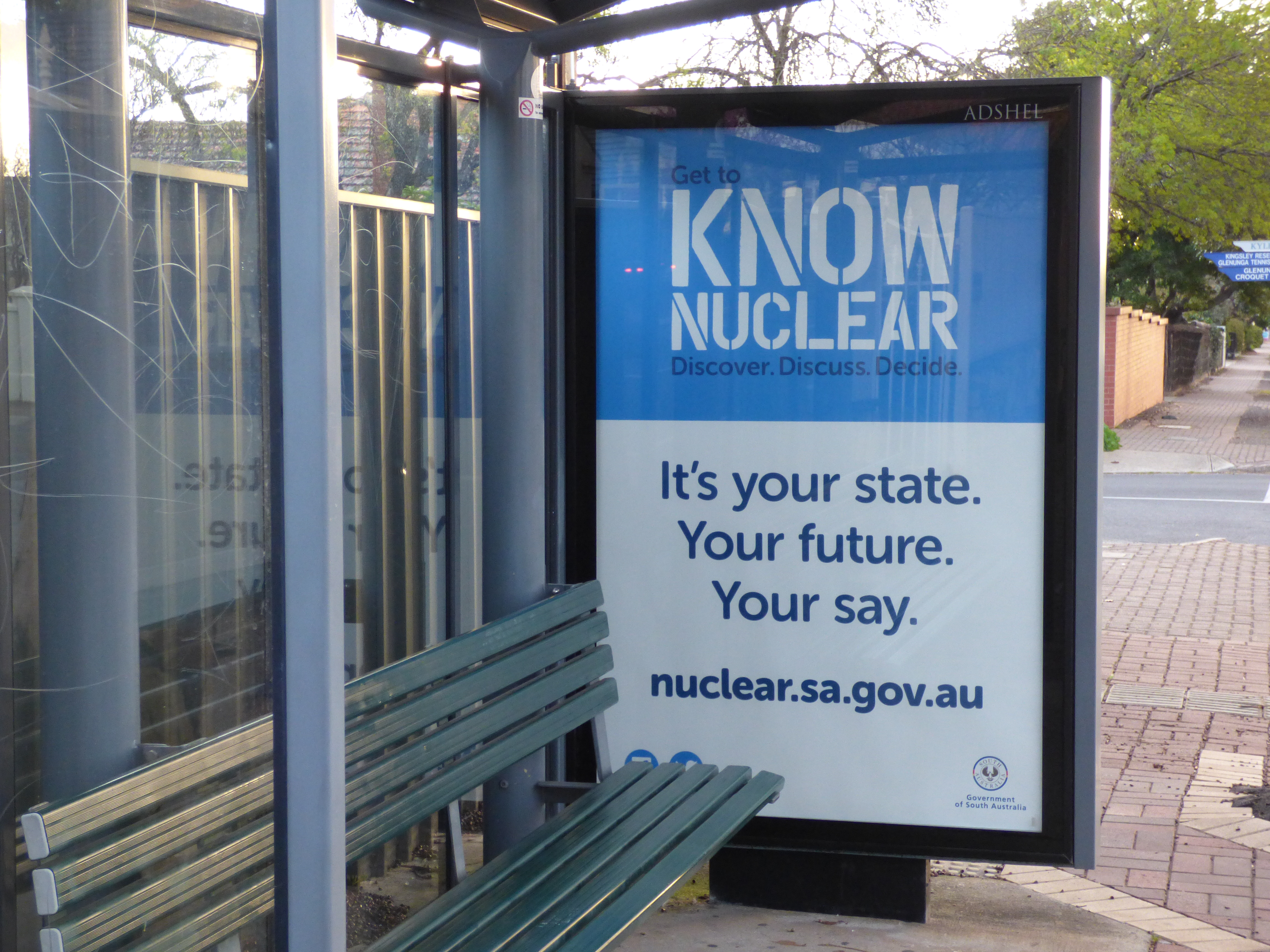
Know Nuclear campaign bus shelter advertisement, August 2016

The first Citizens Jury produced a report after hearing witnesses and deliberating over four sitting days. Its publication was followed by the launch of a statewide community consultation program coordinated by the Department of the Premier and Cabinet. The campaign carried the slogan "Get to know nuclear. Discover. Discuss. Decide" and included print, radio and television commercials, online discussions and community displays attended by DPC staff.

A second jury was later formed, expanding the cohort of jurors to approximately 350 people.

After hearing from a larger cohort of expert witnesses, the citizens' jury ultimately concluded, by a two-thirds majority vote, to not pursue to prospect of the importation of spent nuclear fuel to South Australia under any circumstances. A "lack of trust" was cited as a primary driver.

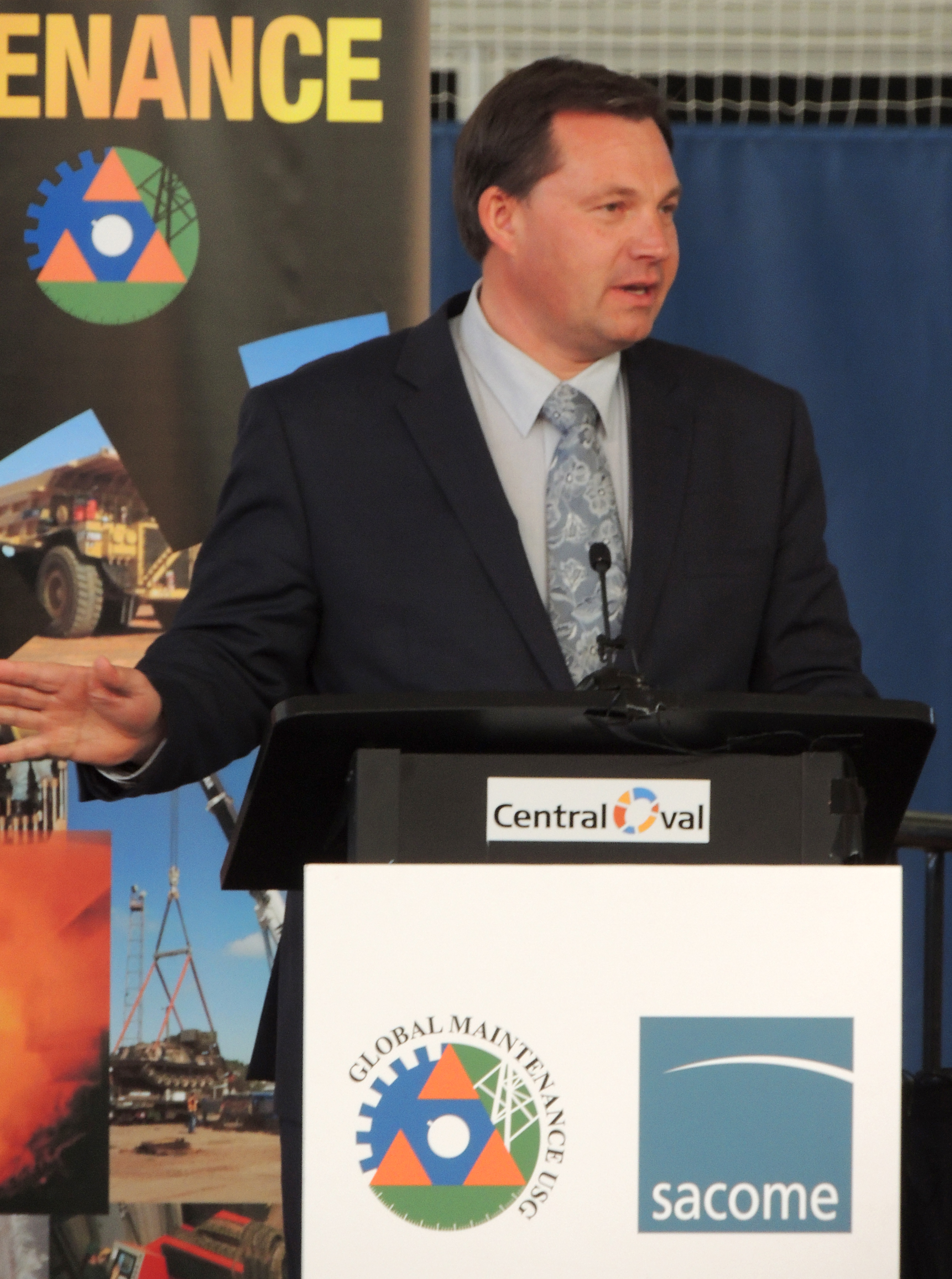
Jason Kuchel, South Australian Chamber of Mines and Energy

=== Support ===
Support for expanding the nuclear industry in South Australia has been expressed by corporate uranium mining interests Western Mining Corporation (the first owner of the Olympic Dam mine), BHP (its successor) and Rio Tinto. Industry representative bodies have also expressed their support, including the Minerals Council of Australia and its predecessors, the Uranium Information Centre and the Australian Uranium Association. Other spokespeople supporting nuclear industrial development in South Australia include Richard Yeeles, Nigel McBride from Business SA and Jason Kuchel from the South Australian Chamber of Mines & Energy. Staff and students of UCL Australia have published research papers supporting the exploration of further nuclear industrial development in South Australia. Professor Stefaan Simons has advocated for the consideration of uranium enrichment and nuclear-powered submarines.

In March 2017, eleven members of the Turnbull government were listed as openly supporting the prospect of nuclear power in Australia. Listed politicians were: Andrew Broad, James Paterson, Tony Pasin, Tim Wilson, Chris Back, Craig Kelly, Eric Abetz, Andrew Hastie, Warren Entsch, Bridget McKenzie and Rowan Ramsey. In June 2017, former Prime Minister Tony Abbott acknowledged fellow former Prime Minister Bob Hawke's support for expanding the nuclear industry and asserted that the "Australian Labor government under Premier Jay Weatherill would like to develop new industries to supplement the uranium mine at Roxby Downs. Why not have a nuclear submarine servicing facility in that state – and the industries that would inevitably spin-off?"

=== Opposition ===
There has been considerable Australian resistance to uranium mining for some decades. There have been concerns that uranium drives the global nuclear weapons cycle, disturbs or degrades sacred sites, releases carcinogenic radon gas, and contaminates groundwater. Nuclear power is considered by opponents as an unsafe, centralised, and secretive energy option, which creates security risks. High-level radioactive waste management has also been another major concern.

Opponents to the expansion of nuclear industry in South Australia include the Australian Greens (whose spokespeople include Scott Ludlam and Mark Parnell), Friends of the Earth, the Australian Conservation Foundation and the Conservation Council of South Australia. Opposition has also been expressed by Kevin Buzzacott, Eileen Kampakuta Brown, Eileen Wani Wingfield and other elders of several indigenous peoples. The Desert Liberation Front has coordinated protest events at the gates of the Olympic Dam mine in 2012 and 2016 using the names The Lizard's Revenge and The Lizard Bites Back.

== See also ==
- Kupa Piti Kungka Tjuta (1995-2004 anti-nuclear waste campaign in Coober Pedy)
