= Haydon Manning =

Australian political scientist

Haydon Manning (born c. 1958) is an Australian political scientist and adjunct professor with the College of Business, Government and Law at The Flinders University of South Australia.

== Early life and education ==
Manning is the son of historian Geoff Manning, born c.1958.

Manning studied at Flinders University, where he earned a Bachelor of Arts degree with Honours First Class, and PhD in 1994.

== Career ==
Manning was associate professor of politics and public policy at Flinders University between 1985 and December 2018.

His areas of interest include voting behaviour and electoral politics, political parties, South Australian political history, politics of uranium mining and political satire. He taught a range of topics including "An Introduction to Government and Democracy"; "Parties, Voters and Elections in Australia"; "Environmental Politics"; "Government, Business and Society" and "The Politics of Climate Change".

Manning contributes to commentary on South Australian and national politics. His commentary on political matters has been published by mainstream Australian newspapers, academic journals, and websites InDaily, The Conversation and On Line Opinion. His academic publications have featured in the Australian Journal of Politics & History, Australian Journal of Political Science, Environmental Politics and the Journal of Industrial Relations. He also frequently presents 'civics and citizenship' education seminars to local government leadership programs and various community organisations such as The University of the Third Age.

Manning co-convened the Electoral Regulation and Research Network, South Australia and for many years was the coordinator of the Copland Leadership Program run by the Committee for Economic Development of Australia's (CEDA) South Australian branch.

== Nuclear industrial politics ==
Manning shifted his position from opponent of nuclear industrial activity to advocate for it during the 2000s. On 7 June 2011, Manning delivered a presentation entitled Mugged by Reality – Why I Shifted from Anti-Nuclear to Pro Nuclear. In his presentation, Manning wrote that "New reactor designs and technical resolution of waste disposal were convincing and reassuring." Manning studied the Cold War defence strategies associated with nuclear weapons proliferation and concluded that domestic use of nuclear power was essentially unrelated to weapons proliferation. Manning also acknowledged Professor Barry Brook as an influence, through his work on climate change. Manning argues that nuclear power is preferable to coal-fired power, and believes that the industrial development of China and India and their increased energy consumption is inevitable.

When Manning taught environmental politics at Flinders University, he focuses "mainly on the politics of climate change and critical analysis of core assumptions underpinning the "traditional" environment movement." and contrast this to the "eco-modernist" discourse. He has stated that the combined effect of informing students of the moral argument which emerged during the 1970s, that Australia should receive nuclear waste as it has benefited from the mining and export of uranium oxide, and exploring nuclear power's role in reducing carbon emissions from electricity generation, leads many of his students to shift their positions on nuclear matters.

Barry Brook has referred to Manning as "a good friend" and has republished a 2010 opinion article written by Manning regarding his adoption of a pro-nuclear position.

In 2012, Manning facilitated the inclusion of nuclear industrial advocates Ben Heard and Barry Brook in the Copland Leadership Program he coordinated for CEDA's SA Branch. The program ran a series of monthly seminars at Flinders University from July through November. The program's 2015 seminars also included the topic "SA's Nuclear Future".

In 2011, Manning co-authored a chapter of the book "Australia's Uranium Trade: The Domestic and Foreign Policy Challenges of a Contentious Export". His contribution was written with Geordan Graetz and was entitled "The Politics of Uranium Mining in Australia". In 2015, Graetz was employed as a research assistant to the Nuclear Fuel Cycle Royal Commission in South Australia, and Manning provided commentary on the commission and its work to various media outlets.

In August 2015, Manning wrote an article in response to the Nuclear Fuel Cycle Royal Commission for the AusIMM Bulletin entitled A nuclear future for South Australia? He speculated that "the most significant factor at play may be what is on offer from one or a number of foreign countries willing to finance, at no cost to the state, nuclear fuel recycling and fabrication, in return for the hosting of used nuclear fuel rods." Referring to Senator Sean Edwards' proposal for the receipt and reprocessing of spent nuclear fuel with associated electricity generation, Manning predicted "a testing time for those who argue with passion against all matters nuclear because, for the first time, the focus will be on tangible economic benefits and detailed justifications." He concluded his article with reference to the Breakthrough Institute and pro-nuclear environmentalism, stating his belief that "eco-modernism offers an epistemological justification for Generation 4 nuclear power, even placing it ‘on the moral high ground’ when framed within the context of climate change. South Australia may yet play a key role in the journey to wean economies off fossil fuels and along the way arrest its own genteel decline."

On 12 April 2016, Manning delivered a public lecture on nuclear topics entitled Matters Nuclear and Political Irony in South Australia.

Manning has spoken on nuclear matters at events at the request of the WA Chamber of Mines and organised by the AusIMM.

=== Criticism ===
Manning's discussions of nuclear industrial activities have been criticised by Friends of the Earth Australia. Spokesperson Jim Green has criticised statements made by Manning in articles published in academic journals, on opinion websites and in Australian newspapers.

== Publications ==
- Manning co-authored the book Worth fighting for : work and industrial relations in the banking industry in South Australia with his father, Geoffrey H. Manning. (Geoffrey Manning was an historian who wrote several books on South Australian history. Among them is an account of Haydon Manning's grandfather's role in the establishment of the McLaren Vale wine industry.)
- Manning, Haydon R. A Social History of Thebarton (PDF). [Undated]. Unclear whether co-authored by Geoff Manning.
