= Ben Heard =

Australian nuclear advocate

Benjamin "Ben" Heard is a South Australian environmental consultant and an advocate for nuclear power in Australia, through his directorship of environmental NGO, Bright New World.

== Career ==
Heard completed a Bachelor of Applied Science, Occupational Therapy from the University of South Australia and a Masters of Corporate Environmental and Sustainability Management from Monash University. As of February 2015, he is a PhD candidate at the University of Adelaide.

Heard worked as a Senior Consultant for GHD (2006-2008) and Senior Consultant in Sustainability and Climate Change at AECOM (2007-2009). He launched his own consultancy in 2009, ThinkClimate Consulting, which wound up in November 2016.

He was the founder and chief author of the blog, Decarbonise SA.

In 2012 he published the Zero Carbon Options report which presented a case for the replacement of aging coal-fired power stations near Port Augusta with a nuclear power plant. Heard sits on the Independent Advisory Panel which informs the planned establishment of a national radioactive waste management facility in Australia as a member of the socio-economic sub group. In November 2015, Heard was appointed to the International Advisory Board of Terrestrial Energy, a company developing molten salt nuclear reactor technology.

Heard's blog Decarbonise SA was succeeded in November 2016 by the launch of Australia's first pro-nuclear environmental not-for-profit organisation: Bright New World. Bright New World ceased operations in 2021.

== Nuclear power advocacy ==
Heard has co-authored articles with pro-nuclear environmental scientists Barry Brook and Corey Bradshaw, and presented alongside them at public and institutional events. Heard has provided commentary on nuclear issues in the South Australian media and has presented on the topic at Australian engineering, resources sector and local government events. Heard's nuclear industrial advocacy continued in the wake of the Fukushima nuclear disaster. On 29 April 2011, Heard gave a presentation at the annual Local Government Association of South Australia conference entitled Nuclear power - from opponent to proponent. The talk appeared in the event's program under the alternative title: Keeping the Lights On - the Irrefutable Case for Nuclear Energy. Later that year, Heard traveled to Perth as a guest of uranium mining company Toro Energy to speak at an event hosted by the Committee for Economic Development of Australia (CEDA). The event was entitled "The Cost of Carbon; Nuclear Energy: Australia’s Clear Energy Future?" and fellow panelists included Haydon Manning and Tony Owen.

In 2012, Heard co-authored and published Zero Carbon Options, a report comparing nuclear and renewable energy options in an Australian context — specifically the replacement of the ageing coal-fired power stations Playford B and Northern located south of Port Augusta, South Australia. Heard successfully raised $7,779 to support a launch event for the project from a crowd-funding base of 106 people.

Heard has provided commercial services to uranium mining company Heathgate Resources, has presented at the Paydirt Uranium conference and has co-authored a series of articles promoting the nuclear industry for the South Australian Chamber of Mines and Energy (SACOME).

In 2014, Heard expressed his view that in order to decarbonise electricity generation "we shouldn't be waiting around for breakthroughs, we need to get on with what we've got. That doesn't exclude wind, solar, wave, geothermal.. but it has to include nuclear or we're not serious."

In late 2014, Heard prepared a discussion paper for the Economic Development Board of South Australia entitled Critical Conversations which examined the "opportunities for rapid industrial development and revenue generation for South Australia through expanded involvement in the nuclear value chain". In 2015, Heard's discussion paper was submitted as part of the Economic Development Board's formal submission to the Nuclear Fuel Cycle Royal Commission. Heard and Brook publicly supported the commencement of the Nuclear Fuel Cycle Royal Commission in March 2015, and Heard subsequently supported Liberal party senator Sean Edwards' vision for a nuclear South Australia, describing it to The Advertiser as "entirely credible". Heard further endorsed Edwards' vision by republishing his speech delivered on April 7 to The Sydney Institute on his blog, Decarbonise SA.

Heard was awarded the United Uranium Scholarship from the Australian Nuclear Science & Technology Organisation (ANSTO) in 2015.

That December, Heard wrote:

"I want to make South Australia the nuclear recycling hub for the 21st century. I support the vision of Senator Edwards who wants high-tech jobs for South Australians for the next hundred years and beyond."

In 2016, Heard launched Australia's first pro-nuclear not for profit environmental organisation, Bright New World. Bright New World's board is Chaired by Martin Thomas AM, former Vice President of the Australian Academy of Technological Sciences and Engineering (ATSE). Fellow boardmembers are Rachael Turner, Stephanie Bolt and Corey Bradshaw.

He was made an Honorary Member of the Leaders Institute of South Australia that year.

In June 2021, Heard's NGO Bright New World was wound up.

In October 2021, Heard authored a report for the Minerals Council of Australia entitled Small Modular Reactors in the Australian context. The Minerals Council of Australia claimed that SMRs could be connected to existing grid infrastructure, used to power regions or remote mining operations if "outdated" bans on use of nuclear energy by State and Federal legislation were repealed.
