= Niki Vincent =

Australian government officer

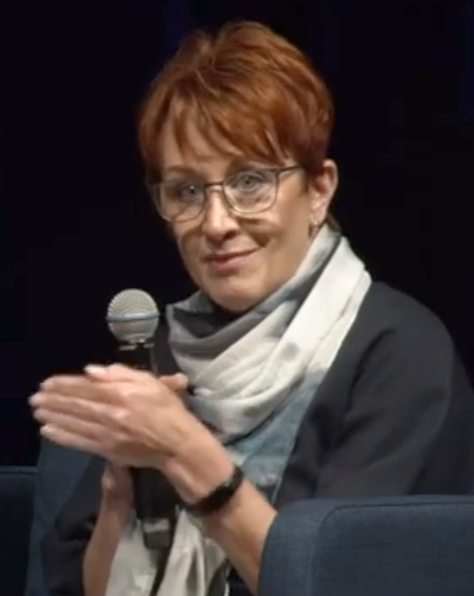
- Vincent in 2022
- Born: Nicola Caroline Vincent; Richmond, London, England
- Education: University of Adelaide
- Occupation: Public servant

Nicola Caroline Vincent is an English-born Australian public servant. She is the inaugural Public Sector Gender Equality Commissioner for Victoria, Australia. Prior to this, Vincent was the Commissioner for Equal Opportunity in South Australia (SA) from May 2016 to September 2020.

== Early life, family, and education ==
Vincent was born in Richmond, London, and at age 11 immigrated to Adelaide. She left home at age 15 and completed her studies living in share houses and supporting herself in part-time jobs. At age 18, she married and had four children by the time she was 25 years old.

Vincent attended the University of Adelaide from 1989 to 1995 where she majored in psychology and media and communications. She was awarded a University Medal for her Honours Degree in Psychology (First Class) in 1995.

Vincent completed her studies while working in part-time paid employment and single parenting her four children after the breakdown of her first marriage. She remarried in 2003, with the marriage ending in 2015.

In 2015, Vincent received a second University Medal and Dean's Commendation (University of Adelaide) for her PhD research and thesis entitled Evolving consciousness in leaders: Promoting late-stage conventional and post-conventional development. She completed her PhD research and thesis while working as a full-time CEO of the Leaders Institute of South Australia and caring for her eldest daughter during four surgeries for a brain tumour and a life-threatening autoimmune disease.

In 2016, Vincent became a respite (weekend) foster parent for a 13-year-old girl from Liberia. In 2020, her foster daughter came to live with her full-time and moved with Vincent to Melbourne, Victoria, when she took up the role of Public Sector Gender Equality Commissioner.

Vincent is also stepmother to her partner Chuck Smeeton's two young adult children and has ten grandchildren.

== Career ==
Vincent has held various senior roles in not-for-profit organizations and academic research institutions. Vincent has held an adjunct position as an associate professor in the University of South Australia’s Business and Law School since 2015. She was awarded an Australian Leadership Award in 2007 and was a State Finalist (SA) in the Telstra Business Woman of the Year Awards in 2005.

=== Public Sector Gender Equality Commissioner for Victoria ===
Vincent was appointed to the statutory role of the inaugural Public Sector Gender Equality Commissioner for Victoria, Australia, in September 2020. She is responsible for overseeing the implementation of the Gender Equality Act 2020 which is the first of its kind at a State or Territory level in Australia.

This legislation requires over 300 organisations in Victoria from across the public sector, universities and local councils to take positive action to achieve gender equality by undertaking Gender Impact Assessments on all new programs, policies and services that impact the public, undertake regular workplace gender audits across seven key indicators, develop Gender Equality Action Plans and make reasonable and material progress (in every 2-year period) to improve gender equality. All audit data and action plans are made public and each organisation must report on their gender impact assessments every four years.

The Commissioner has compliance powers should an organisation fail to comply with the Act and may also assist in resolving disputes about systemic workplace inequality impacting a group or class of employees.

=== Commissioner for Equal Opportunity in South Australia ===
Vincent was the fifth Commissioner for Equal Opportunity in South Australia (SA) from May 2016 to September 2020.

In conjunction with this role, Vincent was Chairperson of the Australian Council of Human Rights Authorities, convened the SA Chiefs for Gender Equity and was on the advisory boards of the Committee for Economic Development of Australia (SA & NT), Play by the Rules and the Centre for Workplace Excellence at the University of South Australia.

During her term as South Australia's Equal Opportunity Commissioner, Vincent established a free legal clinic and Law Internship Program in collaboration with the University of Adelaide Law School, oversaw the White Ribbon Workplace Accreditation Project, and oversaw a whole-of-government Workplace Equality and Respect (WER) Project which aimed to strengthen gender equality and promote safe and respectful workplace cultures across 24 SA public sector agencies. The latter was focussed on preventing and responding to workplace sexual harassment and sexual assault, as well as improved workplace responses to employees experiencing domestic and family violence and employees who might be concerned about their use of violence.

In 2016, Vincent undertook a major independent review into sex discrimination, sexual harassment and predatory behaviour in South Australia Police (SAPOL). Her report was released publicly on 12 December 2016 and found that "…sex discrimination and sexual harassment of women – and anyone else that doesn't fit the white macho male stereotype - is commonplace in SAPOL, including amongst supervisors and managers."

Vincent and her team subsequently established a Restorative Engagement program for SAPOL and delivered a three-year monitoring and advisory program to provide guidance and audit their implementation of the 38 recommendations in the report.

Vincent also conducted an independent review into the organisational culture in relation to gender diversity and inclusion in South Australia's Metropolitan Fire Service. The review found that female officers had suffered bullying, harassment and discrimination in the workplace.

Vincent also undertook an independent review of policy and infrastructure to prevent and respond to sexual harassment and sexual assault at the University of Adelaide in 2017 and a follow-up audit of the implementation of its 42 recommendations in 2019.

During her term as South Australian Equal Opportunity Commissioner, Vincent was outspoken about issues such as sexual harassment, violence against women, LGBTIQ discrimination, racism, disability discrimination, and diversity and inclusion, as well as the lack of funding for her office.

=== Leaders Institute of South Australia ===
Prior to her appointment as SA Commissioner for Equal Opportunity, Vincent was chief executive officer of the Leaders Institute of SA from 2004 to 2016, a leadership development organisation she established and grew. In this role, she developed and delivered the Governor's Leadership Foundation Program and other programs for senior leaders across the business, government, university and not-for-profit sectors to build ethical and adaptive leadership capacities.

In addition, Vincent held concurrent appointments as a Member of the SA Remuneration Tribunal, Chair of Community Leadership Australia, board member of Time for Kids, Chairperson of the Voices of Women Board, and Member of the Institute for Educational Leadership, the Higher Education Council of SA and the Premier's Roundtable on Sustainability.
