= Dunsford (surname) =

Dunsford is an English habitational surname. Notable people with the surname include:

- Brian Dunsford (born 1936), Australian rules footballer
- Cathie Dunsford (born 1953), New Zealand novelist
- Colin Dunsford, Australian accountant
- Cynthia Dunsford (born 1962), Canadian politician
- James Dunsford (1814–1883), English-Canadian politician
- John Dunsford (1855–1905), Australian politician
- Martin Dunsford (1744–1807), English antiquarian
