= Energy Change Institute =

The Energy Change Institute is a research centre at the Australian National University in Canberra, dedicated to the study of "carbon free forms of energy production" and their application in response to climate change. It focuses on energy research and education ranging from "the science and engineering of energy generation and energy efficiency, to energy regulation, economics, sociology, security and policy." The ECI claims to be technology and policy neutral. The ECI maintains a close relationship with its sister organisation, the ANU Climate Change Institute and shares a common secretariat. The institute's director is Professor Kenneth Baldwin.

== Media commentary ==
The institute provides frequent commentary to the Australian media on matters related to national energy policy, including (but not limited to) renewable energy and nuclear energy technologies.
