= Steve Ludlam =

Steve Ludlam may refer to:

- Steve Ludlam (footballer)
- Steve Ludlam (engineer)
