= Dunsford (disambiguation) =

Dunsford is a village in Devon, England.

Dunsford may also refer to:

- Dunsford (surname), an English surname
- Dunsford Aerodrome, an airport in Ontario, Canada
- Dunsford Halt railway station, a disused railway station in Devon, England
- Dunsford, a community in Verulam Township, Ontario, Canada
