= Richard Yeeles =

Richard Yeeles in an English-born Australian businessman and former senior South Australian public servant with interests in the resources sector, particularly uranium mining and processing.

== Career ==
Yeeles has worked at the Olympic Dam mine near Roxby Downs in South Australia under the management of Western Mining Corporation and later BHP Billiton during their open-pit expansion proposal. Yeeles holds the position of Corporate Affairs Manager at BHP Billiton and was appointed Approvals and Community Director of the Australian Securities Exchange listed uranium explorer and prospective mining company Toro Energy in October 2009.

Yeeles entered the resource sector in 1996, having previously held several key senior positions within the Government of South Australia including Chief of Staff for both the Premier and Opposition Leader, Press Secretary and Manager of Public Relations. Yeeles worked as Chief of Staff for Liberal party opposition leader Dale Baker in 1989. In the 1990s he was Baker's closest confidante and adviser and remains a close friend. Yeeles began his professional life as a cadet journalist for the ABC and is the editor and author of two books about former South Australian premier, Don Dunstan.

Yeeles was appointed as a member of the Resources Industry Development Board in 2008. The board provides policy advice to the Government of South Australia.

Yeeles was appointed to the Olympic Dam Agreement Trust Advisory Council in 2010. The council provides advice to the trustee administering payments to Aboriginal people in northern South Australia under the terms of the Olympic Dam Agreement.

In 2015, Yeeles wrote a 270-page submission to the Nuclear Fuel Cycle Royal Commission supporting the development of high-level nuclear waste storage facilities and an expanded nuclear industry in South Australia.

In 2016, he was appointed Policy Director of the Liberal Party of South Australia.

Yeeles also provides services as an advisor for the corporate advisory firm and political lobbyist, Barker Wentworth.

=== Olympic Dam mine ===
Richard Yeeles has worked on the Olympic Dam mine project since 1996. He was first employed by Western Mining Corporation, and entered the employ of BHP Billiton after its corporate takeover of WMC. He has served as a media spokesperson for both companies in addition to fulfilling his core role in Corporate Affairs.

==== 1995 contamination allegation ====
In July 1996, an allegation of a worker contamination incident in 1995 was raised in the South Australian parliament by Democrat, Sandra Kanck. It was claimed that drums of radioactive waste had been transported illegally from the Lucas Heights nuclear facility in New South Wales to the Olympic Dam mine where they were run through processing plant facilities in an experiment which failed. Yeeles told the media that the material was 11 tonnes of yellowcake and that "All necessary government clearances were obtained for the transportation and the material underwent normal processing... there was no failure of the process."

Kanck's allegation claimed that waste precipitated to the bottom of one of the very large separation tanks and set like cement and that workers were contaminated on the first day of excavation. Her account stated that "they sent Geiger counters ‘off the scale' when they entered the lunch room. They had taken off their protective clothing and washed but still had a comparatively high level of radiation on their bodies."

On 2 August the Minister for Mines and Energy, Dale Baker stated that "The transport took place with full knowledge of both State and Commonwealth Governments. All necessary and appropriate notifications were made."

==== 1999 uranium processing plant fire ====
On 24 December 1999 a fire occurred at the Olympic Dam uranium processing plant. Richard Yeeles told the media that the fire caused no injuries, and that there was "certainly no effect to public health at all". He described the fire as burning kerosene in a solvent collection pond. He also stated that there was no contact between the fire and any radioactive material, and that the wind was blowing from the south (suggesting that any smoke would travel away from the township of Roxby Downs).

==== 2009 seawater desalination plant proposal ====
In 2009, BHP Billiton published an Environmental Impact Statement for the proposed expansion of the Olympic Dam mine. Public concern had been expressed as early as 2006 that the brine discharge proposed for Point Lowly could harm the mass aggregation of giant Australian cuttlefish which occurs on rocky reef near Port Bonython, between Point Lowly and Whyalla. Richard Yeeles told the ABC that there would be "no adverse impact on cuttlefish from the operation of the desalination plant." The statement was refuted by marine ecologist Bronwyn Gillanders of the University of Adelaide who published scientific research demonstrating the vulnerability of the animals' eggs to local increases in salinity. The desalination plant received environmental approval, but as of 2015 has not been constructed.

== Publications ==
=== 1978 Don Dunstan compilation ===
Yeeles compiled content for the book Don Dunstan – The first 25 years in Parliament, which was published in 1978. Yeeles was inspired to produce the book during the years 1970–1974 when he was a Parliamentary reporter with the Australian Broadcasting Corporation (ABC).

=== 2014 Don Dunstan biography ===
In 2014 Yeeles published a Don Dunstan biography as an e-book entitled: Don't Ask. Don't Tell.: Too long untold – Don Dunstan in life and politics. The book purports to contain "new perspectives on the controversies of his life, including some personally corrupt behavior, the sacking of a police commissioner and his banning of uranium mining" with reference to documentary evidence.

Public responses to the book were varied, ranging from criticisms that the book was "pulling him down from the pedestal... almost vicious at times and unbalanced" through to compliments for "a very, very thorough and important work."
