= Nigel McBride =

Australian lawyer and businessman

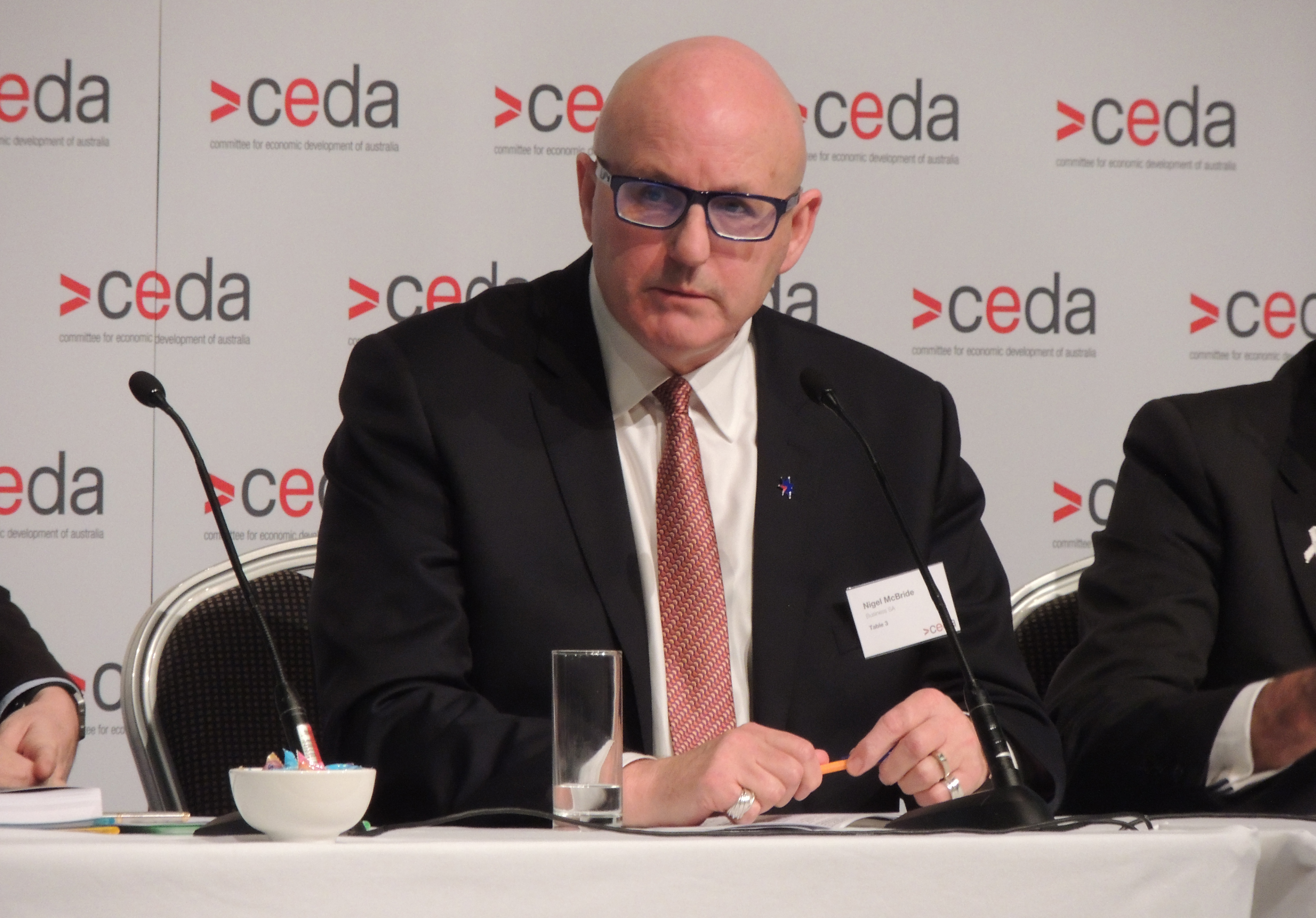
Nigel McBride at a CEDA event in Adelaide (2016)

Nigel McBride is a prominent lawyer and businessman who lives and works in South Australia. He is the CEO of Business SA, the South Australian Chamber of Commerce and Industry and is a member of the State Advisory Council of the Committee for Economic Development of Australia (CEDA) for South Australia and the Northern Territory.

== Career ==
McBride worked in finance and industrial relations sectors for several companies, including Rank Xerox, ICI and Glaxo. He then joined the public service as Director, Legal Administration of the Health Department of Western Australia.

McBride worked as Chief executive and Managing Partner of legal services firm MinterEllison for 12 years. While at MinterEllison, McBride worked in Perth and Adelaide as the firm grew to become South Australia's largest commercial legal services provider. He also established the firm's Darwin office.

McBride left MinterEllison and was appointed CEO of Business SA in 2 July 2012, replacing Peter Vaughan.

He is a former chairman of Advantage Adelaide and served on its board for eight years, and a former director of the Cancer Council SA (2012–2013). McBride has served as a board member of the National Business Action Fund and is an Ambassador for the Impact Awards, the purpose of which is to "ignite abundant local technology and innovation to have more global impact."

He is a Graduate and Fellow of the Australian Institute of Company Directors, speaks on topics including business strategy, leadership and risk management and is a frequent media commentator on topics related to business in South Australia.

== Nuclear industrial advocacy ==
McBride has advocated for the consideration of economic opportunities in the nuclear fuel cycle at various times since his appointment as CEO of Business SA in 2012.

In its 2014 Charter for a Prosperous South Australia, Business SA called for "a mature debate of the nuclear energy industry in SA". McBride stated that South Australia has "almost 25% of the world's uranium so there is a huge economic potential for SA that could be a 'game changer'."

In February 2015, Premier Jay Weatherill contacted McBride to advise him of his government's intentions to initiate a Nuclear Fuel Cycle Royal Commission. McBride described the prospect of "nuclear recycling" as "wonderful" with specific reference to the PRISM reactor and its ability to reprocess spent nuclear fuel. McBride told 5AA:

"If we want an enrichment industry, we certainly need a storage industry and a waste disposal industry. these things are worth billions and billions of dollars and we've just got to weigh it up. We've got to say "well, we've got a stable geology, we've got this opportunity. Let's at least investigate it"... We understand that the [nuclear waste storage] industry potential runs into the billions of dollars."

During the undertakings of the Nuclear Fuel Cycle Royal Commission, he indicated support for the consideration of economic opportunities for South Australia in nuclear waste storage and the construction of purpose-built vessels for its transport. In February 2016, McBride was reported by the ABC as believing "a nuclear push is of longer-term economic benefit, but not a short-term fix for the state."

In April 2016, he suggested that the future South Australian built submarine fleet could potentially be a combination of diesel and nuclear powered Barracuda-class vessels. He also went on a delegation to visit European nuclear facilities with members of the Committee for Adelaide.

In October 2017, McBride told InDaily that Business SA intends to lobby for further investigation into the importation of spent nuclear fuel to South Australia following the next South Australian election.
