= Daniel Zavattiero =

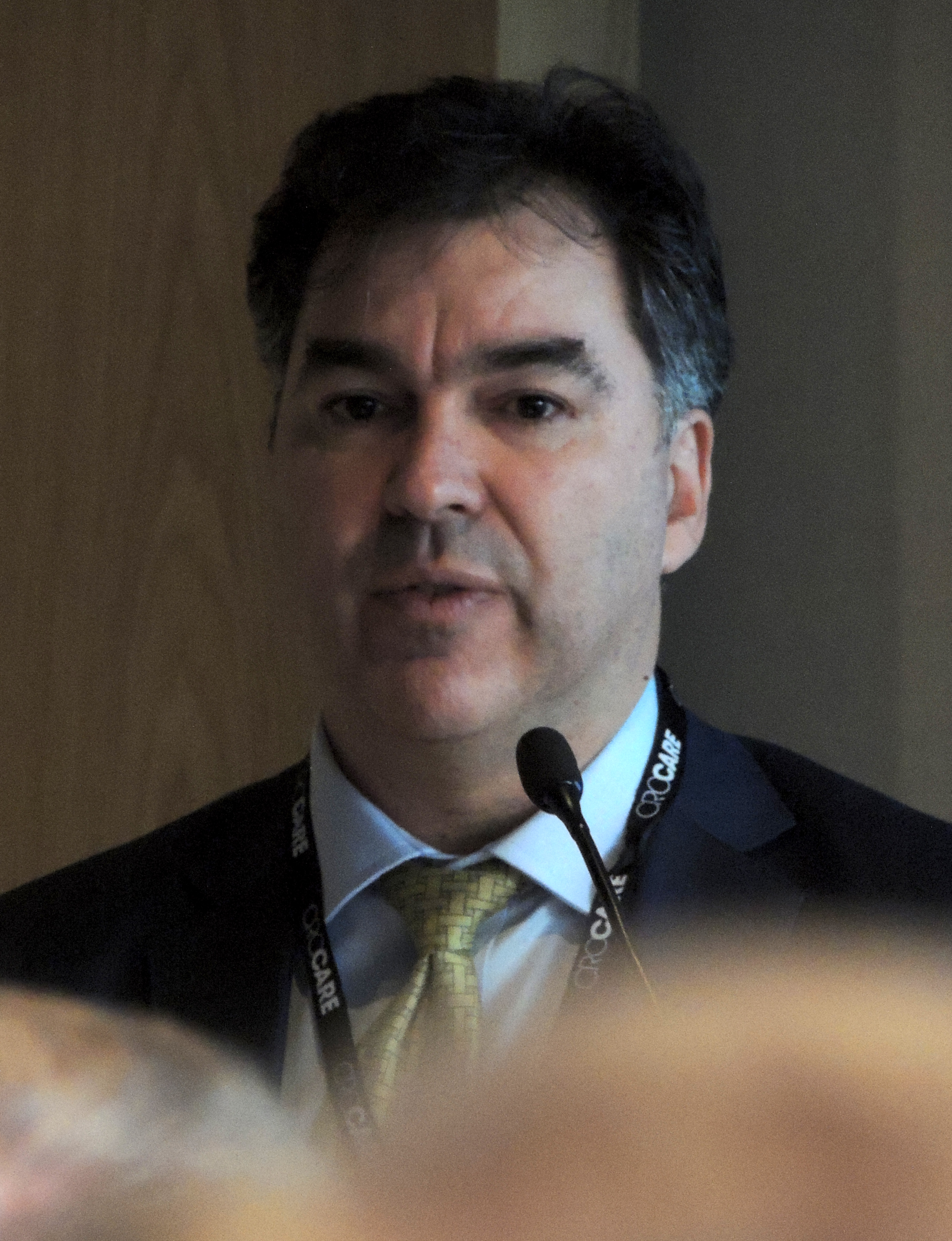
Daniel Zavattiero, Minerals Council of Australia at CARECRC forum, Adelaide (2015)

Daniel Zavattiero is an Australian advocate representing the interests of the nation's uranium mining sector. He is a career mining and metals marketing professional who represents the uranium mining portfolio for the Minerals Council of Australia.

== Career ==
Zavattiero studied in Melbourne where he obtained a Bachelor of Economics with Honours from Monash University and a Graduate Certificate of Corporate Management from Deakin University. He entered the resources and mining sector and was employed for 22 continuous years by BHP, including through its transformation into the global resource company, BHP Billiton. Zavattiero's career began in Melbourne at BHP steel, followed by iron ore and ultimately uranium (from 2008 to 2013). He worked in sales, marketing, distribution and procurement and the last position he held at the company was General Manager Marketing - Uranium. He worked in Perth, The Hague and Singapore before returning to Melbourne to live.

Zavatierro has held a position on the organising committee of the annual AusIMM International Uranium Conference, at which he has also been a presenter.

== Nuclear power advocacy ==
Zavattiero has managed the uranium portfolio of the Minerals Council of Australia since its merger with the Australian Uranium Association in 2013. He advocates for nuclear power in Australia as an opinion writer, event organiser and public speaker. In June 2014, he called for the lifting of Australia's ban on nuclear power generation, speaking on behalf of the Minerals Council of Australia. The announcement of South Australia's Nuclear Fuel Cycle Royal Commission received his support in February 2015. Since the commencement of the Royal Commission, Zavattiero has endorsed Australia's agreements to export uranium to India, the United Arab Emirates and Ukraine.
