= Fraser Ainsworth =

Australian businessman (born 1946)

- Born: 5 February 1946; New South Wales, Australia
- Died: 7 June 2021 (aged 75); Adelaide, South Australia
- Occupation: Businessman
- Spouse: Kelly

Born in Cootamundra, New South Wales, Australia on 5 February 1946, Eric Fraser Ainsworth (known as Fraser Ainsworth) was a South Australian businessperson active in the energy and resources sectors. He received a Centenary Medal in 2001 and became a Member of the Order of Australia in 2003. He retired from his position as chairman of Horizon Oil Ltd in 2015 and was inducted into the Australian Institute of Energy's Hall of Fame the same year.

In March 2017, Ainsworth signed an open letter calling for the Government of South Australia to continue to investigate the "opportunity to develop an international used nuclear fuel management industry" identified by the Nuclear Fuel Cycle Royal Commission in 2015–16.

Ainsworth died in Adelaide, South Australia on Monday 7 June 2021.

== Personal life ==
Fraser Ainsworth and his wife Kelly placed their Millswood home on the market in June 2017 with an anticipated sale price of $AUD 3.5-3.7 million.
