= Australian Uranium Association =

Australian mining trade group

The Australian Uranium Association was an Australian industry trade group which represented companies involved in uranium exploration, mining and export. It operated from September 2006 until 2013, after which its responsibilities were absorbed by the Minerals Council of Australia.

== History ==
From 2006 to 2013 the Australian Uranium Association acted as a national advocate for uranium mining and export and commissioned research and polling on uranium mining issues. Its predecessor, the Uranium Information Centre, was replaced by the Association in the same year of the AUA's foundation. The chairman of the Association was Rob Atkinson, Chief Executive Officer of mining company Energy Resources of Australia (ERA) and its chief executive was Michael Angwin. Responsibility for the uranium portfolio within the Minerals Council of Australia was passed to Daniel Zavattiero, a former senior executive with BHP's uranium business.

== Membership ==
The Association had two full members (BHP and ERA), and 29 participating and associate members. Associates comprised all of Australia's uranium mining and export firms plus a number of explorers and project developers working to take the next set of uranium mines into production.

== Nuclear industrial advocacy ==
The Association supported increased exports of Australian uranium for power generation purposes, arguing that nuclear power produces virtually no greenhouse gas emissions, is a cheap alternative to coal and oil-based energy production and that if Australia becomes a major player in uranium exports it would be in a position to ensure adherence to international nuclear safety standards and the Nuclear Non-Proliferation Treaty. The Association maintained that Australia has sufficient uranium to cater for one third of worldwide demand, and viewed restrictions on new mines as an issue affecting the nation's international competitiveness.

== See also ==
- Anti-nuclear movement in Australia
- Gavin Mudd
- List of inquiries into uranium mining in Australia
- Nuclear industry in South Australia
- Uranium mining in Australia
- Uranium mining in Kakadu National Park
