= Brian Dunsford =

Australian rules footballer

Personal information
- Full name: Brian James Dunsford
- Born: 26 September 1936
- Died: 2 June 2022 (aged 85)
- Original team: McKinnon
- Height: 178 cm (5 ft 10 in)
- Weight: 70 kg (154 lb)

Playing career^{1}
Years	Club	Games (Goals)
1957	Melbourne	7 (1)
- ^{1} Playing statistics correct to the end of 1957.

Brian James Dunsford (26 September 1936 – 2 June 2022) was an Australian rules footballer who played with Melbourne in the Victorian Football League (VFL).
