= Kenneth Baldwin =

Australian physicist

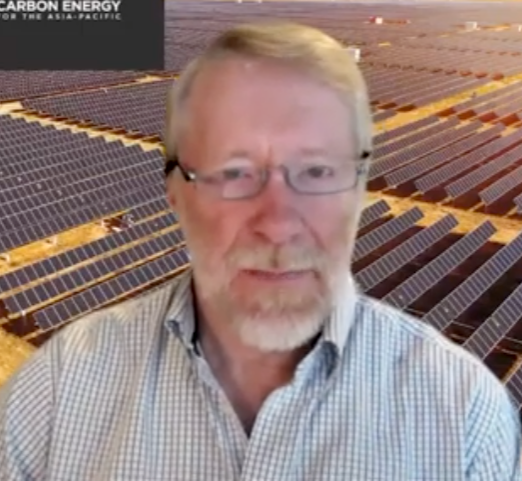
- In an online discussion in 2021
- Born: 26 November 1954 (age 71); Canberra, Australia
- Education: Australian National University; Imperial College London
- Occupation: Physicist

Ken Baldwin (born 1954) is an Australian physicist who is professor of physics at the Australian National University (ANU). He is the deputy director of the Research School of Physics and the director of the ANU Energy Change Institute.

== Career ==
Ken Baldwin was born on 26 November 1954 in Canberra, Australia. He completed a Bachelor of Science and a Master of Science at ANU, followed by a PhD at Imperial College London.

Baldwin's main contributions as a research scientist pertain to two related fields of physics: the use of laser techniques (in particular the generation of vacuum ultraviolet radiation <200 nm) for the precision measurement of atoms and molecules; and the use of laser cooling to trap and manipulate metastable helium atoms to study fundamental quantum physics and for precision measurement.

Baldwin has published over 100 refereed publications in experimental atomic, molecular and optical physics, as well as over 200 conference papers.

In 2007, Baldwin received the W.H. Beattie Steele Medal – the highest award of the Australian Optical Society. In 2010 he received the Barry Inglis Medal from the National Measurement Institute for "excellence in precision measurement."

Baldwin has played a leading role in optics in Australia, and from 1993 to 1994 he was president of the Australian Optical Society.

Baldwin served on the Australian Academy of Science's National Committee for Spectroscopy (1996–2005), and the National Committee for Physics (2000–03, 2014–present).

He was the first Australian to chair the International Council on Quantum Electronics from 2002 to 2005, overseeing the premier world laser conference series IQEC. In 2011 he chaired the IQEC/CLEO Pacific Rim conference in Sydney.

Baldwin was elected by the worldwide membership of the Optical Society of America (OSA) to a 3-year term (2006–2008) as director at large of the OSA Board, the only time that an Australian has served in this capacity.

In 2010 Baldwin established the ANU Energy Change Institute (ECI) as its Founding Director.

In 2014 Baldwin chaired the OSA Congress on Light, Energy and the Environment in Canberra – the first time that this conference has been brought to Australia - and which featured Professor Steven Chu, former Energy Secretary to President Barack Obama. As of 2016, his role as Chair is ongoing.

Baldwin is a Fellow of the American Physical Society, the Institute of Physics (UK), the Optical Society of America and the Australian Institute of Physics. He was elected a Fellow of the Australian Academy of Technology and Engineering in 2021.

== Science policy ==
Baldwin has been a key contributor to science policy in Australia. He was elected as President in 2008–09 of the Federation of Australian Scientific and Technological Societies (the peak science advocacy group – now Science and Technology Australia, and also served as FASTS vice president (1994–95), policy chair (1996–2005) and president-elect (2006). In 2004 Baldwin was awarded the Australian Government Eureka Prize for Promoting Understanding of Science, for his role in initiating and championing "Science meets Parliament". This annual event comprises meetings between hundreds of scientists and politicians and is supported by Federal government funding. His contributions to Public Policy at ANU were recognised in 2012 by the award of one of nine inaugural ANU Public Policy Fellowships.

In 2014 he received the ANU Vice Chancellor's award for Enhancing the Reputation of the University.

== Energy policy ==
Through his role as Director of the ANU Energy Change Institute, Baldwin has contributed to national energy policy, including through ECI submissions to:

- The 2012 Energy Green Paper
- Emissions abatement options for Australia: assessments against criteria of magnitude, cost and quality 2014
- Review of the Renewable Energy Target 2014
- The 2014 Energy Green Paper

In 2012 Baldwin initiated Energy Update, the ECI's annual flagship event at which the International Energy Agency presents the latest World Energy Outlook, critiqued by a series of discussion panels. This is in addition to numerous other ECI public events, such as those providing public discussion forums on the Federal government's Energy White Papers.

Since 2011 Baldwin has been a member of the Project Steering Committee for the Australian Energy Technology Assessment (AETA) produced by the Bureau of Resources and Energy Economics (BREE). In 2015, he was appointed as a member of the Socio-Economic Modelling Advisory Committee to the South Australian Nuclear Fuel Cycle Royal Commission.

== Renewable energy commentary ==
Baldwin's roles in energy policy have led to commentary on renewable energy as a solution to climate change. This includes numerous media interviews, as well invited articles in journals, online publications and wider media commentary. Examples include:

- "Australian energy cost estimates: experts respond", The Conversation (2012)
- "Stopgap carbon policies: far from perfect, but better than nothing", The Conversation (2014)
- "A little Ray of Sunshine", PolicyForum.Net (2014)
- "Renewable energy deal gives no certainty over coming decades", The Conversation (2015)
- "FactCheck: Would Labor's renewable energy plan cost consumers $60 billion?", The Conversation (2015)
- "FactCheck Q&A: Will China have a 150% increase in carbon emissions on 2005 levels by 2030?", The Conversation (2015)
- "The Solar Energy Contribution Scheme" (Research School of Economics Working Paper no. 627, 2015; Centre for Climate Economics and Policy, Working Paper no. 1508, 2015).
- "Why is the ACT bringing forward its 100% Renewable Energy Target to 2020?" The Canberra Times (2016)

== Nuclear power commentary ==
Baldwin has also commented on nuclear power in Australia. Following the announcement of the Nuclear Fuel Cycle Royal Commission in South Australia in February 2015, Baldwin told the ABC:

Australia is an energy rich country... we have 40 per cent of the worlds uranium stock, so it makes enormous sense for us to look at to replacing our fossil fuels with renewables and also with the prospect of using our vast quantities of nuclear power.

In June 2015 Baldwin told the Science Show on ABC Radio National that "the use of nuclear power to generate electricity is going to be carbon free". Professor Baldwin also speculated on the prospect of nuclear industrial development in Australia, stating:

It's these two things—social licence and a regulatory framework—that really need a lot of attention in the near future if we are going to have a nuclear industry in this country. It will involve a process that could take a considerable period of time.

Baldwin also commented on the changing nature of the electricity market in Australia, and pointed to some uncertainty around the economics of nuclear power.

The price of renewables is dropping, solar is dropping much faster than wind. And it could well be that by 15 years' time solar is really in a position to be the leading form of new power generation. If we wait too long then the nuclear option might have gone completely.

- "Nuclear could be a power of good", PolicyForum.net and Advance (2014).
- Baldwin, Ken (11 May 2016). "What role will Australia have on the nuclear world stage?". The Age.
