= Colin Dunsford =

Australian accountant and company director

Colin Wayne Dunsford AM is a retired Australian accountant and company director. He was a partner at Ernst & Young until 2010 and continues there as a member of the firm's advisory board. He is a Fellow of the Institute of Chartered Accountants in Australia and holds a Bachelor of Economics. In 2013, he became a Member of the Order of Australia "for significant service to the community of South Australia, and to the accounting profession". In 2016, he was one of a group of prominent South Australians who signed an open letter encouraging government to continue to explore opportunities in the importation and storage of spent nuclear fuel, following the findings of the 2015–16 Nuclear Fuel Cycle Royal Commission.

== Current board memberships ==
- Chairman of Independent Gaming Corporation
- Chairman of Leaders Institute of South Australia
- Chairman of the Adelaide Symphony Orchestra's Foundation
- Chairman, SA Health Risk Management & Audit Committee
- Chairman, Department of State Development Audit and Risk Committee
- Chairman of Aboriginal Foundation of South Australia
- Board Member of Peter Couche Foundation
- Member, University of Adelaide Finance Committee

== Past memberships ==
- Chairman of Bedford Group
- Chairman, DFEEST Audit & Risk Management Committee
- Chair of Audit Committee, Centrex Metals
- Deputy Chairman of Adelaide Festival of Arts
- Chairman of the Adelaide Convention Centre
- Chairman of the State Opera of South Australia
- Chairman of the Adelaide Symphony Orchestra

== Personal life ==
He lives in Leabrook, South Australia.
