= Defence SA Advisory Board =

South Australian Government advisory board

The Defence SA Advisory Board provides high-level strategic and policy advice to the Government of South Australia "to promote the growth of Defence and defence industries in accordance with South Australia’s Strategic Plan." Air Chief Marshal Sir Angas Houston AK AFC was appointed to chair the board in 2014, replacing General Peter Cosgrove AC MC in the position. The board was established in 2007 and meets six times a year. The board was preceded by the Defence Industry Advisory Board (DIAB), which was established in 2003.

== Membership ==
As of 2019, the Defence SA Advisory Board's membership includes:

Member	Commenced
Air Chief Marshal Sir Angus Houston AK AFC (Retired) - Chair	
Vice Admiral Russell Crane AO CSM RANR	
Mr Richard Price	
Steve Ludlam FREng	
Rear Admiral Trevor Ruting AM CSC RANR	2008
Professor Pascale Quester	

=== Former members ===
Member	Commenced	Ceased
Hon Jay Weatherill - Premier of South Australia		
Dr Neil Bryans		
Hon Martin Hamilton-Smith MP		
Paul Johnson MBE		
Andy Keough CSC		
Beth Laughton	2007	
Lieutenant General Peter Leahy AC		
Emeritus Professor Paul Dibb AM		
Malcolm Jackman	2014	2015
Jack Snelling MP	2011	2013
Dr John White	2009	2015
Kim Beazley	2009	2009
Andrew Fletcher (former CEO of Defence SA)	2007	2015
General Peter Cosgrove AC MC - Chair	2007	2014
Charles Chessel	2007	2014
Les Fisher	2007	2012
Kevin Foley MP	2007	2011
Mike Rann MP	2007	2011
Malcolm Kinnaird	2007	2009
David Shackleton	2007	2009
Norman Adler - Deputy Chair	2007	2008
