= Committee for Adelaide =

Independent membership-based organisation in Adelaide, South Australia

- Type: Incorporated association
- Founded: 2013
- Headquarters: Adelaide, South Australia
- Website: committeeforadelaide.org.au

The Committee for Adelaide is a non-partisan membership-based organisation providing an independent voice for the state of South Australia. Founded in 2013, the Committee is committed to its namesake, Adelaide, the capital city of South Australia.

== History ==
Established in 2013, the Committee for Adelaide is part of the Committees for Cities and Regions Network. Its founding members are Ernst & Young and oil and gas company Santos Ltd and its foundation was influenced by political lobbyist Ian Smith.

Its inaugural chair was Colin Goodall, a retiree from the oil and gas sector. He was replaced by James Blackburn, a partner with PwC in November 2017 and by Professor David Lloyd, the vice chancellor and president of the University of South Australia in August 2019.

The first general manager of the Committee for Adelaide was Timothy Horton, who was followed by Matt Clemow in 2014. The first full-time chief executive officer of the Committee, Jodie van Deventer, began in September 2016.

== Governance and membership ==
Its membership of the Committee for Adelaide is made up of some of many diverse and influential organisations in South Australia.

Its board includes professionals across numerous industries. As of January 2024, Raymond Spencer is chair, and Heather Croall is a board member. Frances Adamson AC, Governor of South Australia, is patron.

As of October 2025, Sam Dighton is CEO.

The Committee for Adelaide has four different tiers of membership: Platinum, Corporate, Small Enterprise Member, and Associate Member.

== Activities and projects ==
The Committee has worked on policies and initiatives to attract talent, business, and capital.

In 2016, and following discussions with Kevin Scarce and the Nuclear Fuel Cycle Royal Commission, the Committee for Adelaide organised a delegation to visit several nuclear industrial facilities in Europe in April 2016. InDaily reported that the delegation visited the Olkiluoto nuclear power plant and Onkalo spent nuclear fuel repository. The delegation returned to Adelaide a day before the Nuclear Fuel Cycle Royal Commission delivered its final recommendations to the Parliament of South Australia. On 6 May, spokespeople for the delegation expressed their support for the establishment of nuclear waste storage facilities in South Australia.

In 2017, it launched its business attraction project "Boards without Borders", and in 2019 launched its talent attraction program Adelaide Abroad, designed to attract skilled migrants and expats and make their transition back to Adelaide easier.

In 2020, the Committee for Adelaide hosted a workshop with the 50 most influential people in South Australia as identified by The Advertiser. This followed a call from one of the 50, Sam Shahin from the Peregrine Corporation, for those on the list to use their influence for the good of the state. Ten key ideas emerged with the Committee for Adelaide taking an active interest in energy, education, superannuation and a youth forum.

The Committee for Adelaide facilitates SA ZERO, a public-private-academic collaboration.

It has also prepared submissions into foreign policy white papers and infrastructure inquiries as well as given evidence at various parliamentary hearings.

Some of the publications it has produced include:

- Inquiry into Migration in Regional Australia (2019)
- Vision for Adelaide (2019)
- The Economic contribution of migration to South Australia (2019)
- University Merger submission (2018)
- Shaping Adelaide’s Future (2016)
- Attracting the business we need (2014)
- Attracting the people we need (2013)
- Earning our place in a global economy (2013)

== In the media ==
In 2017, the Committee for Adelaide made national headlines when it met with then Prime Minister Malcolm Turnbull regarding energy security, company taxation and migration. Australian Financial Review journalist Phil Coorey, speaking on Adelaide radio station FIVEaa, said at the time that it was the Committee's Canberra delegation – that included medium-sized businesses – that had helped "take the sting" out of the company tax debate opening the way for Nick Xenophon MP to agree to cuts for businesses with turnover of up to $50 million. The deal included a $110 million loan for a massive solar thermal plant in South Australia and a study into constructing a long-mooted gas pipeline from the Northern Territory to South Australia.

The Committee for Adelaide is often quoted by the media and has had numerous opinion pieces published in various media, including:

- SA should race for next generation of motorsport
- How do you see Adelaide getting over this?
- Are we going to step up after COVID-19?
- Beyond the gloom, Adelaide has a chance to recreate itself.
- The devastating truth about reconciliation.
- SA has much to lose if submarine work goes west
- Defence can steer state into the future
- Adelaide is about the stories we tell ourselves
- South Australia needs policies to turbo charge population growth
- South Australia cannot lose its voice in Canberra because of poor population growth
- Bikes, electric scooters must be made legal for the road
- We need vibrant high-tech industry
- Clock ticking on nuclear waste site debate (10 February 2021)
- "Urgency and political will": SA's climate risk threatens entire communities (30 October 2025)

== See also ==
- Committee for Melbourne
