= Steve Ludlam (engineer) =

Steve Ludlam is a defense industry engineer and former chief executive of the Australian Submarine Corporation (ASC). He was recruited to ASC from the United Kingdom in 2010 and held the position until mid 2014. In the UK, Ludlam was President of Submarines at Rolls-Royce where he led the modernisation of the country’s nuclear-powered submarine program. He first worked with Rolls-Royce as a development engineer on nuclear submarine programs. He was promoted to General Manager of the Submarine Nuclear Reactor Test Establishment prior to his executive appointment. Mr Ludlam has a degree in Mechanical Engineering and a master's degree in Nuclear Engineering. He is a Fellow of Engineers Australia and has been acknowledged as one of Engineers Australia’s 100 most influential members four times. He is a Fellow of the Institution of Mechanical Engineers, UK and the Royal Academy of Engineering.

In 2015, Ludlam was appointed to the Defence SA Advisory Board in South Australia.

In 2016, he was appointed Chair of South Australia's Automotive Transformation Taskforce and Chair of the Northern Economic and Social Implementation Board.
