= Sean Edwards (politician) =

Australian politician

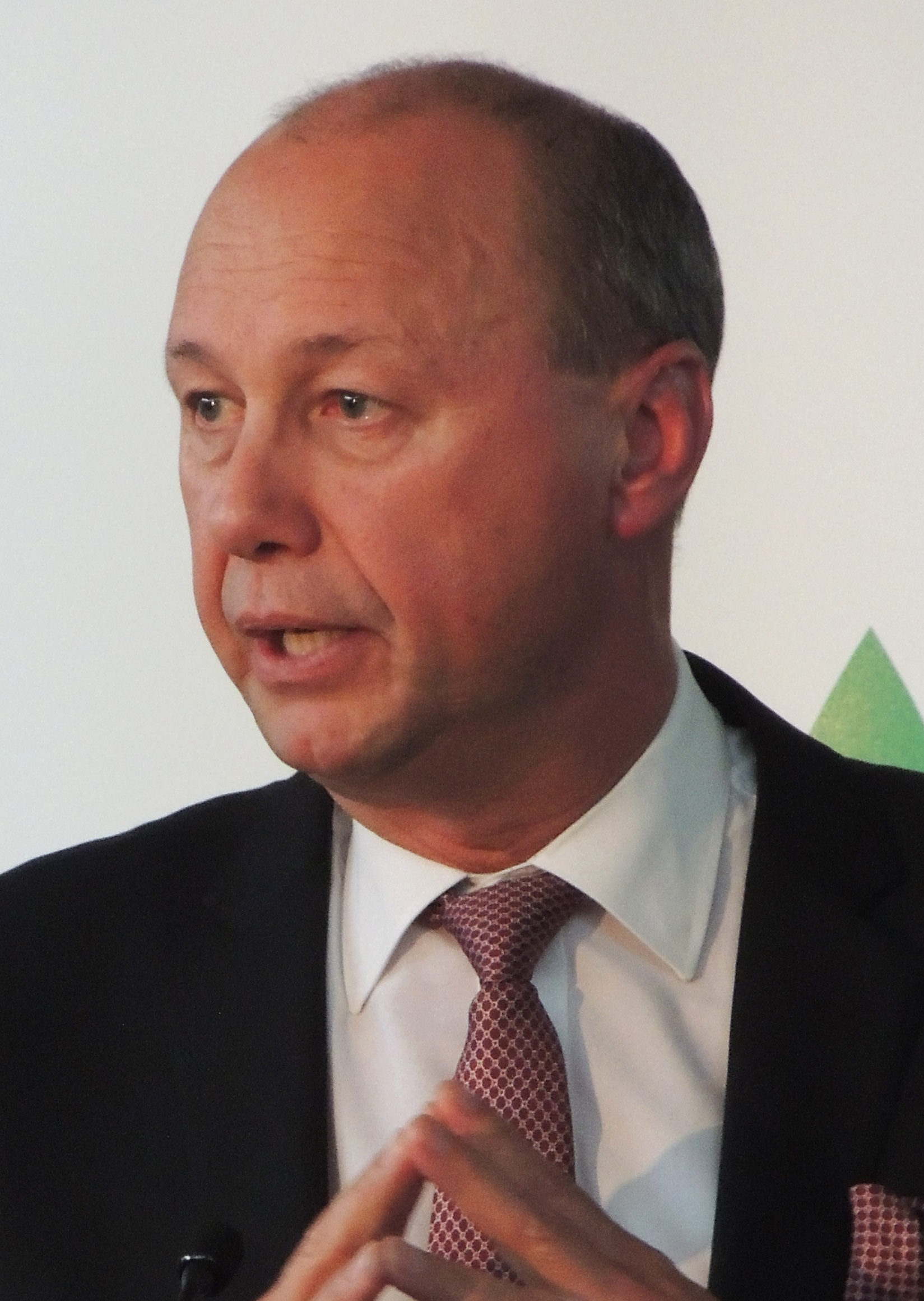

Senator for South Australia
- In office 1 July 2011 – 2 July 2016

Personal details
- Born: 2 January 1962 (age 64) Clare, South Australia, Australia
- Party: Liberal Party of Australia
- Spouse: Monica Edwards divorced Ashleigh Falconer divorced
- Children: 3

Sean Christopher Edwards (born 2 January 1962) is an Australian politician who was a member of the Australian Senate for South Australia from 2011 to 2016, representing the Liberal Party.

== Early career ==
Edwards was an auctioneer, land and estate agent from 1980 to 1996. From 1996 he was a vigneron and winemaker in the Clare Valley wine region of South Australia. He and his direct family have significant private vineyard holdings in Clare and the Adelaide Hills, and he is a director of Kirribilly Wines.

From 1985 to 1988 Edwards was president of the Blackwood and Districts Young Liberals. He was the vice president of the Clare branch of the Liberal Party from 2002 to 2004, and president from 2004 to 2008. Edwards was president of the Wakefield Federal Electoral Commission from 2006 to 2008. He was state president of the South Australian division of the Liberal Party and a member of the Liberal Party Federal Executive and Finance Committee from 2007 to 2010. He became a life member of the South Australian Liberal Party State Council in 2010.

== Parliamentary career ==
Edwards was elected to the Senate from second position on the South Australian Liberal Party ticket, which garnered 37.3 percent of the statewide vote at the 2010 election. Edwards took his seat on 1 July 2011. Since joining the senate, Edwards has voted consistently with his party.

The Liberal Party conservative faction leader Nick Minchin had openly opposed Edwards' nomination for Liberal preselection on the party's Senate ticket. Edwards is backed by the moderate faction. Edwards had defeated conservative faction candidate Bob Jackson for the state party presidency two years earlier.

In August 2011 it was reported in News Limited media that the Department of Finance had sought reimbursement from Edwards over the misuse of three government-funded cars. Edwards' wife later apologised for the event and confirmed that they would reimburse the cost. Media outlets also reported that Edwards was being investigated by the Department of Finance over the employment, in his parliamentary office, of an executive of a company he chaired before entering parliament.

== Nuclear power advocacy ==
Edwards is an advocate for nuclear power in Australia. He believes that economic opportunities exist for his home-state of South Australia in spent nuclear fuel reprocessing and the use of Integral Fast Reactors to generate electricity. During a speech delivered to The Sydney Institute on 7 April 2015, Edwards said that he had worked on a business case for the expansion of nuclear industries in SA for around two years. He told the audience that he had commenced discussions with an unnamed foreign state which expressed in-principle support for covering the capital costs of deploying new nuclear technology. Edwards said that discussions on the matter had advanced to "a ministerial level". He has also attacked the Australian Greens for maintaining their opposition to nuclear power. In the Australian Parliament, Edwards has voted very strongly in support of uranium export.

== Personal life ==
Edwards represents the fifth generation of his family to have been born in Clare in South Australia's Mid North. He grew up there with five brothers, with some of whom he later went into business. According to a 2015 autobiography, he has fathered four children.
