= Nuclear Fuel Cycle Royal Commission =

Royal Commission on Australia's role in nuclear fuel

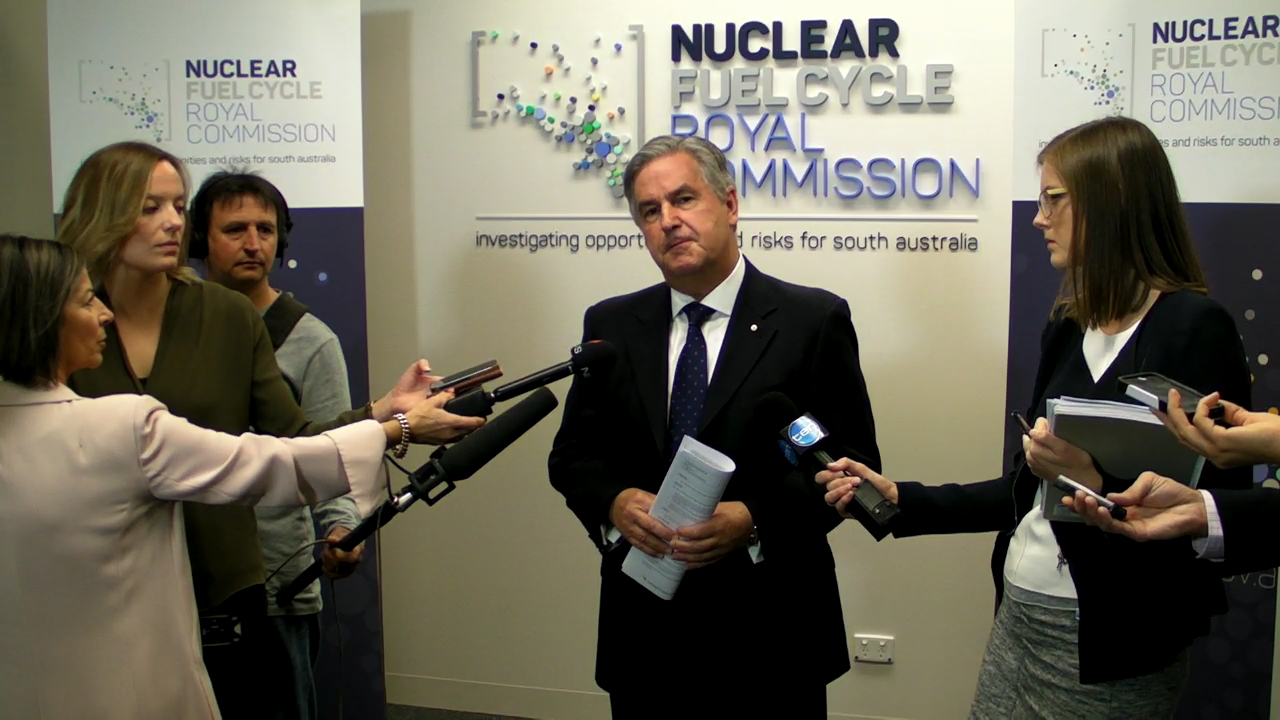
- Royal commission press conference in Adelaide, 17 April 2015
- Date: 19 March 2015 – 6 May 2016
- Duration: 1 year, 1 month
- Type: Royal commission
- Commissioner: Kevin Scarce
- Counsel assisting: Chad Jacobi
- Outcome: 12 recommendations
- Final report: Nuclear Fuel Cycle Royal Commission Report, delivered to Governor Hieu Van Le on 6 May 2016 and publicly released on 9 May 2016.

The Nuclear Fuel Cycle Royal Commission is a Royal Commission into South Australia's future role in the nuclear fuel cycle. It commenced on 19 March 2015 and delivered its final report to the Government of South Australia on 6 May 2016. The Commissioner was former Governor of South Australia, Kevin Scarce, a retired Royal Australian Navy Rear-Admiral and chancellor of the University of Adelaide. The Commission concluded that nuclear power was unlikely to be economically feasible in Australia for the foreseeable future. However, it identified an economic opportunity in the establishment of a deep geological storage facility and the receipt of spent nuclear fuel from prospective international clients.

== Announcement and sequence of events ==
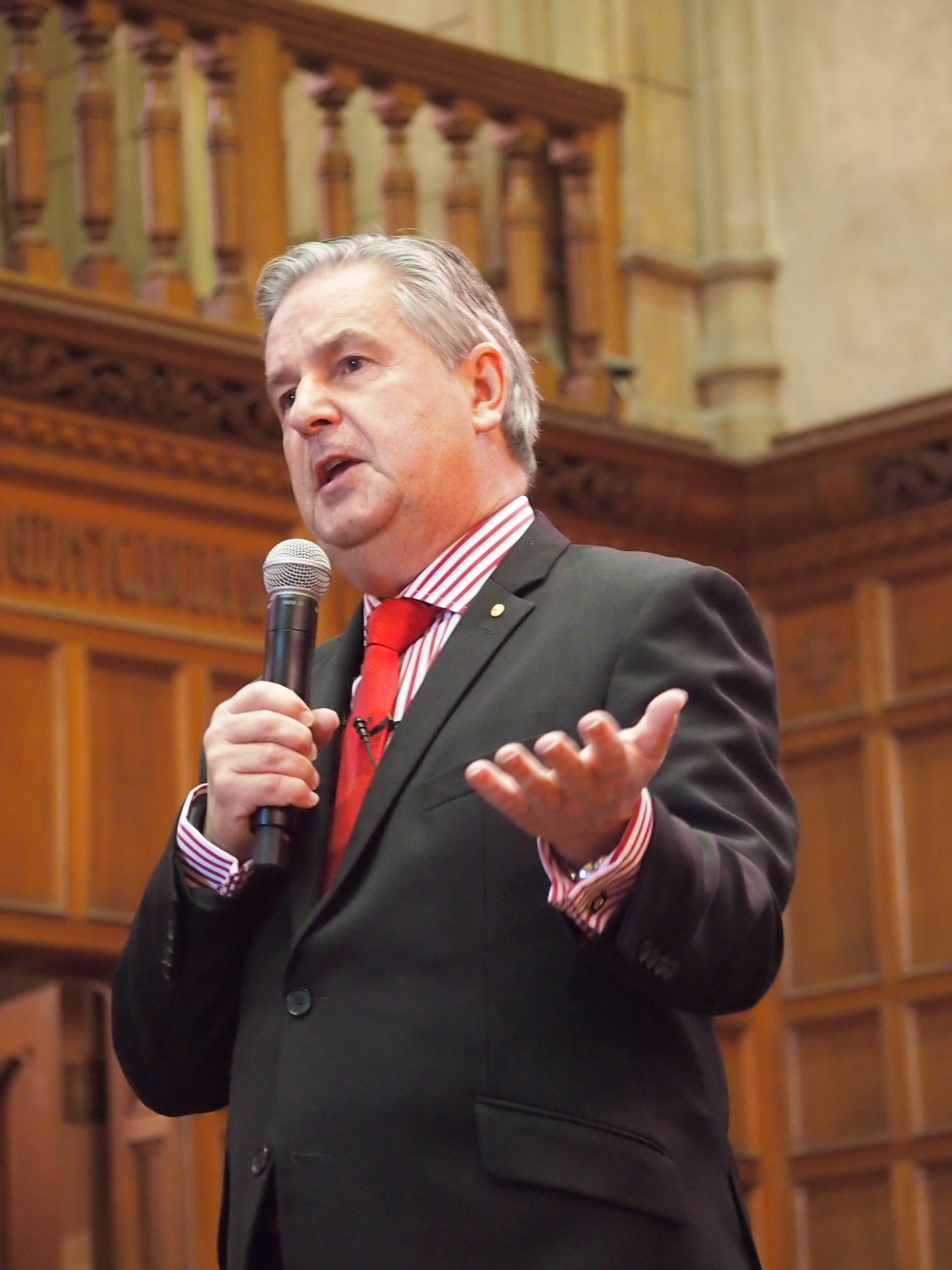
Commissioner Scarce answering a question in relation to the Nuclear Fuel Cycle Royal Commission at a public forum held at Bonython Hall, 22 May 2015

In February 2015, Premier Jay Weatherill announced that the Government of South Australia would be undertaking a Royal Commission to investigate South Australia's potential future role in the nuclear fuel cycle. Former South Australian Governor Kevin Scarce was appointed as Royal Commissioner.

The Terms of Reference for the commission were set following two rounds of public submissions which were subsequently published on the Government of South Australia's YourSAy website. The Terms of Reference were announced on 19 March 2015 by the Governor of South Australia Hieu Van Le. They directed the royal commission to investigate matters related to exploration, extracting and milling; further processing and manufacture; electricity generation; and management, storage and disposal of waste.

A set of four Issues Papers, written by the Commission's Technical Research Team, were released via the Commission's website in March 2015. A period for public submissions responding to questions posed in the Issues Papers closed on 3 August 2015. By 11 August 2015, 73 submissions had been made available to the public. Over 250 submissions were received, of which 247 were made publicly available. The Commission used these submissions to inform the preparation of a series of public hearings.

In May 2015, a list of names of staff and their potentially relevant pecuniary interests was published on the Nuclear Fuel Cycle Royal Commission's website.

The first of an expected 30 to 40 public hearings was to be held in Adelaide on 9 September 2015 and hearings were expected to continue into early 2016.

A report of the Commission's Tentative Findings was released on 15 February 2016, and was followed by another 5 week opportunity for public comment. Responses received were to be published on the Commission's website on 2 May 2016. As of 5 May 2016, 104 of the 170 submissions which directly addressed the Tentative Findings had been made publicly available.

The Commission's final report was delivered to the South Australian Governor on 6 May 2015. Thereafter, former Commissioner Scarce continued to provide occasional briefings and presentations related to the Commission's inquiry and findings, beginning with a briefing for the Premier and Cabinet on 9 May 2019.

=== Royal Commissions in South Australia ===
The Nuclear Fuel Cycle Royal Commission is governed by the Royal Commissions Act 1917 (SA). The Act outlines the powers and functions of a Royal Commission with respect to inspecting places and objects, summoning persons to appear before the commission, summoning of documents relevant to the inquiry, inspection of these documents or any other, and examining witnesses on oath, affirmation, or declaration. In effect, a Royal Commission has the same powers and protections as a Supreme court. Royal Commissions are exempt from the Freedom of Information Act 1991 (SA).

According to the 2015-16 South Australian State Budget, $6 million was allocated over 2 years to cover the operating costs of the Royal Commission. In December 2015, an additional $3.1 million in State Government funding was announced. Additional funding has been sought from the Commonwealth Government.

Following the receipt of the final report of the Royal Commission, Premier Jay Weatherill announced that the inquiry had cost a total of $7.2 million.

== Expert Advisory Committees ==
Three Expert Advisory Committees were formed during the Royal Commission. The first Expert Advisory Panel was announced on 17 April and was composed of Dr. Timothy Stone, Prof. Barry Brook, Dr. Leanna Read, John Carlson and Emeritus Prof. Ian Lowe. Carlson also later gave testimony as an expert witness during one of its Public Sessions, and Leanna Read also sat on the Commission's Radiation Medical Advisory Committee. A Socio-economic Modelling Advisory Committee was later announced, composed of Ken Baldwin and Quentin Grafton from the Australian National University, Mike Young and Paul Kerin from the University of Adelaide and Sue Richardson from Flinders University. The Radiation Medical Advisory Committee was composed of Roger Allison, Dorothy Keefe, Daniel Roos and Leanna Read.

== Community consultation ==
Community consultation occurred through written submissions made in response to questions raised in four issues papers and the commission's Tentative Findings. A series of public forums were held, where the community had opportunities to ask questions directly of the Commissioner and members of his staff.

=== Issues papers ===
Four issues papers were written by the Technical Research Team and were then vetted by the Expert Advisory Committee prior to publication. The first of the four issues papers had been released on April 17, with the announcement of the Expert Advisory Committee's membership. By May 2015, a complete set of four issues papers had been published. The final closing date for formal public submissions was 3 August 2015.

The issues papers covered the following themes:

1. Exploration, Extraction and Milling
2. Further Processing of Minerals and Manufacture of Materials Containing Radioactive and Nuclear Substances
3. Electricity Generation from Nuclear Fuels
4. Management, Storage and Disposal of Waste of Nuclear and Radioactive Wastes

Each of the Issues Papers form the questions to which the Royal Commission is providing to the public to assist them in making a submission. Each paper responds to the Terms of Reference as declared by the Governor of South Australia with three themes of viability, feasibility and risks and opportunities of each part of the nuclear fuel cycle.

=== Public forums ===
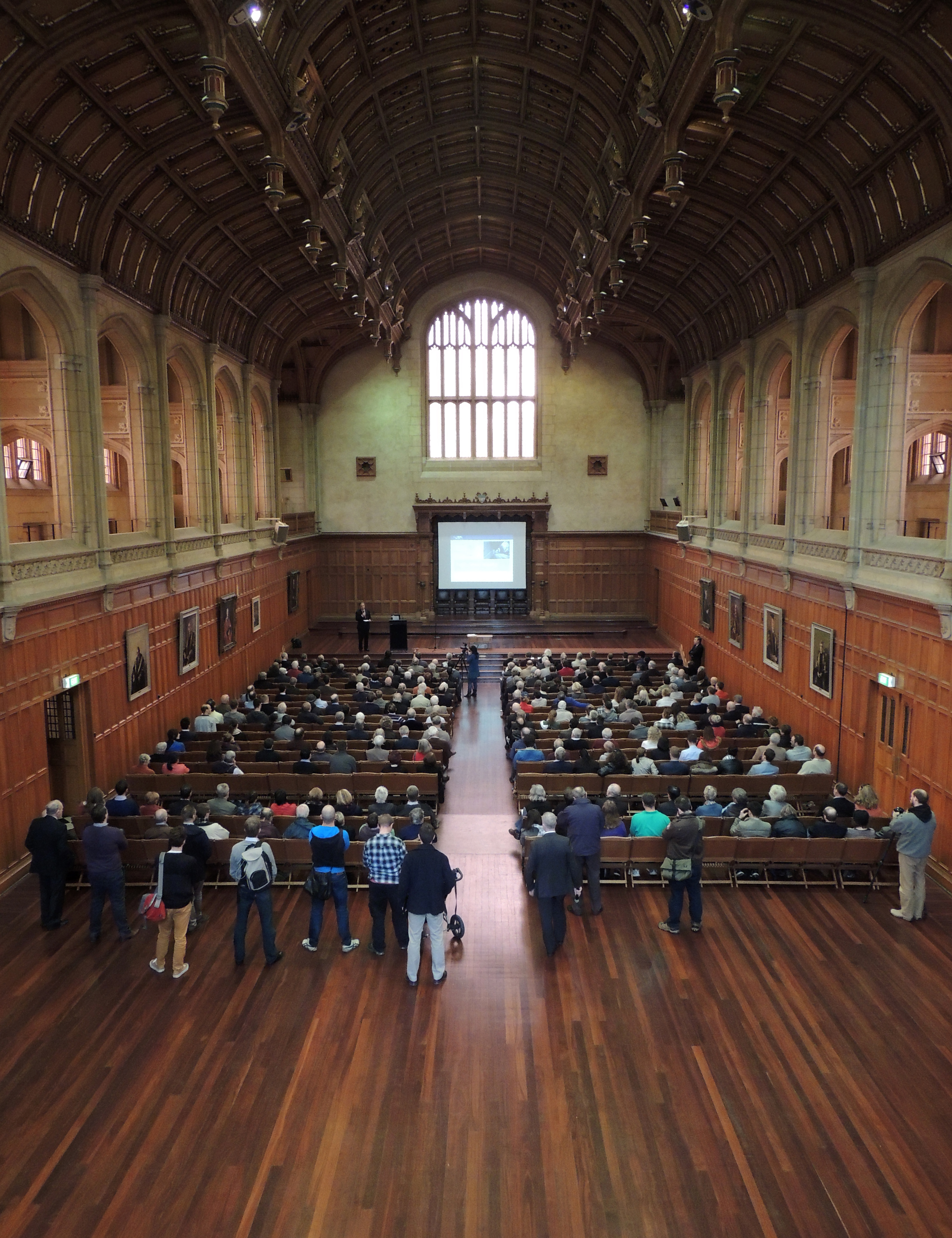
Nuclear Fuel Cycle Royal Commission public forum, Bonython Hall, University of Adelaide, 22 May 2015

Public forums hosted by Commissioner Scarce were held in regional South Australia and in Adelaide. These sessions introduced the Commission and the submission process to the general public. A second round of community consultation sessions commenced in late June 2015. These included a combination of return visits, and visits to new locations. Jon Bok and solicitor Bonnie Russell were present at the Ceduna event on 7 July. A third round of public forums will conclude in December 2015.

== Public hearings ==
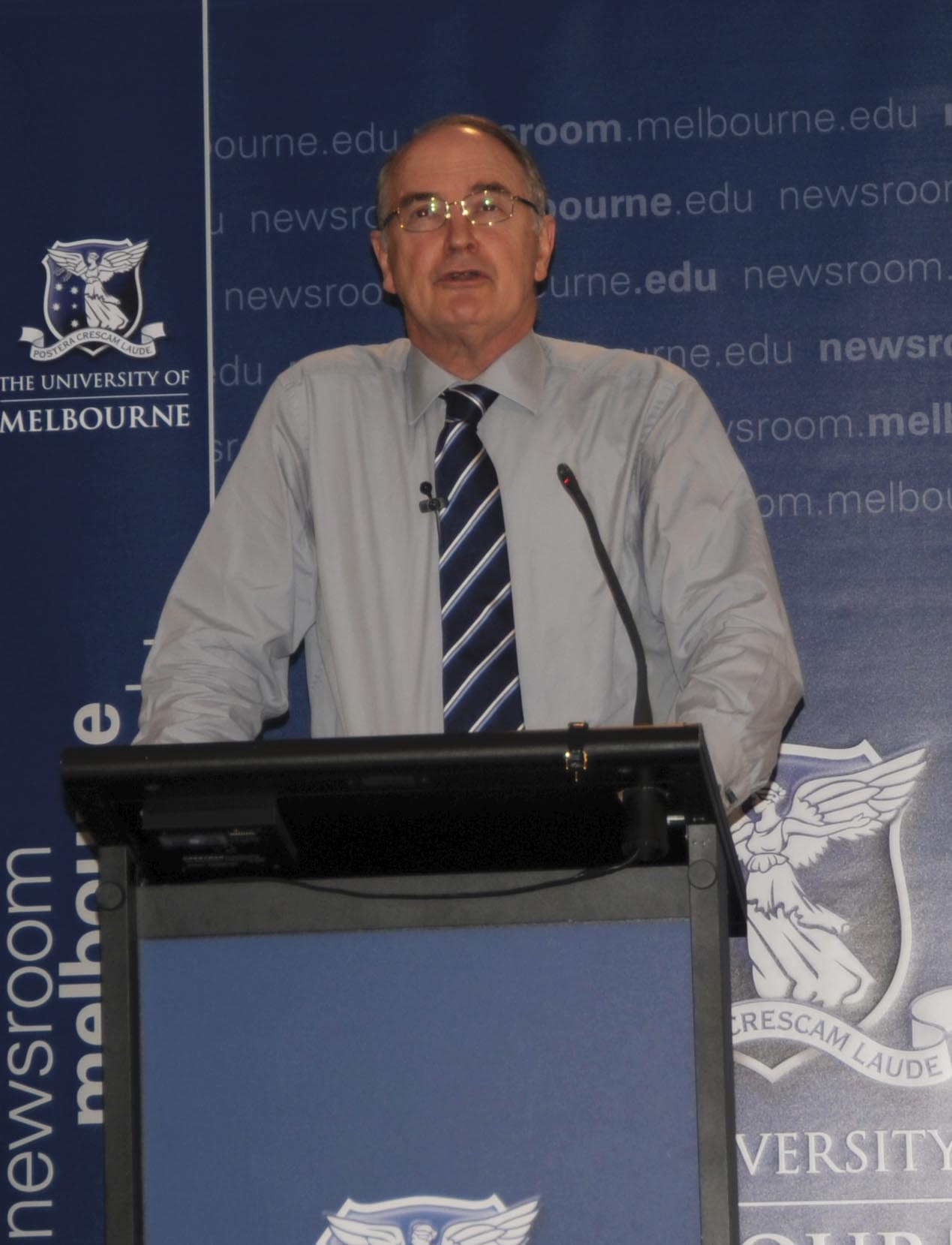
Ross Garnaut

On 30 August 2015 the media reported that public hearings would commence on 9 September 2015. The Commission will summon expert witnesses to ask questions of them in person. Commissioner Kevin Scarce expects that 30 to 40 hearings will be held, three per day and up to 90 minutes each in duration. All of the hearings will be streamed live on the internet.

The first round of hearings will present experts on the topics of climate change, energy policy, the National Electricity Market (NEM), South Australian geology and hydrology and low carbon electricity generation. Later hearings will cover topics including lessons learnt from past activities in South Australia, storage and disposal of radioactive waste, best practice regulation and community engagement, and radiation risks to the public and environment.

== International visits ==
The commission toured internationally during May and June 2015 with objectives of gather evidence and meeting relevant experts. A delegation of three had planned to travel to the site of the Fukushima nuclear disaster in Japan. Other destinations included the United Kingdom, France, Taiwan and Finland where visits to nuclear facilities took place, and to Vienna, Austria, where the commission met with the industry's international regulator, the IAEA at its headquarters. Commissioner Scarce said that the visits "assisted the commission's understanding of the challenges, successes and lessons learnt by countries active in the nuclear fuel cycle" and "increased the commission's understanding of current technology and advancements in nuclear energy and highlighted both good and bad practices."

On 25 June, Scarce told radio station 5AA that further processing of uranium, nuclear power generation and waste storage were all "on the table at the moment." He said that he had seen nuclear industries and food production coexisting in Japan, France and Finland, and wasn't concerned about the prospect of new developments adversely impacting the state's clean, green food production image. He acknowledged that the Commission was now investigating the economics of further fuel cycle involvement.

Scarce also announced that further international visits would be made by the Royal Commission to the USA and to Canada. American destinations included Washington, D.C., and Pennsylvania. Canadian destinations were limited to Ontario and included Port Hope, Toronto, Ottawa and Chalk River. Two additional international visits were made to the United Arab Emirates in late July, and to South Korea in late August.

== Public responses ==
=== Appointment of the Commissioner ===
Following his appointment, Commissioner Scarce was accused of having previously demonstrated a pro-nuclear bias by opponents of the royal commission including Friends of the Earth Australia. Scarce denied that he is an advocate for the nuclear industry and indicated that he was comfortable in the role of commissioner.

=== Submission process ===
Aboriginal woman Karina Lester and Chief Executive Craig Wilkins of the Conservation Council of South Australia raised concerns that the submission process was unnecessarily complicated as written submissions were required to be signed by a Justice of the Peace. Lester and Wilkins argued that this would be particularly difficult for members of regional and remote communities. Lester also pointed out that the language of the Commission's presentations and issues papers made them difficult for aboriginal people to comprehend. Lester drew attention to her father, Yami Lester, who lost his sight after exposure to radioactive fallout from British nuclear weapons tests at Maralinga and Emu Field in the 1950s and 1960s. She told the ABC:

"My father (lives) 27 kilometres west form Marla Bore, (he) doesn't drive, wouldn't have a JP on hand, and would probably need to travel down to Coober Pedy... but he certainly has a story to tell and certainly would love to have input into the Royal Commission."

The Royal Commission responded by agreeing to accept oral submissions in addition to formal written submissions.

=== Support ===
Nuclear power advocates Prof. Barry Brook and Ben Heard supported the announcement stating that the debate about nuclear power in Australia has "remained open to distortions, fabrications and fear-mongering. Fortunately, such tactics will not withstand the scrutiny of a Royal Commission. As scientists, academics and evidence-based activists, concerned with facts and objective judgement, we welcome this process." Prof. Barry Brook was appointed to the Royal Commission's Expert Advisory Committee and announced on 17 April 2015.

The Minerals Council of Australia's uranium portfolio spokesperson, Daniel Zavattiero, expressed support for the Royal Commission on behalf of the industry body. He told attendees of the 2015 AusIMM International Uranium Conference that "the announcement of a Royal Commission here in South Australia into Nuclear Fuel Cycle potential has turbo-charged interest in the uranium and nuclear industries, not just here in South Australia but throughout Australia." As of 2015, the MCA's Board of Directors includes representatives of three established uranium mining companies (BHP Billiton, Rio Tinto Group and Paladin Energy) and the prospective uranium miner, Toro Energy.

Terry Krieg, a spokesperson for the Australian Nuclear Association said in March 2015 that he was preparing a submission to the Commission, and that he hoped that Eyre Peninsula would embrace nuclear industrial development. One of the possible developments he suggested was a nuclear-powered seawater desalination plant at Ceduna, powered by uranium from Olympic Dam.

The London-based World Nuclear Association expressed support for the future deployment of nuclear power in Australia and also welcomed the announcement of the Commission, stating:

"[Australia] currently makes no use of nuclear energy to generate electricity, with a law in place prohibiting this. The Royal Commission presents the chance to dispense with this fundamentally outdated and unscientific policy forever."

Liberal Party Senator Sean Edwards has indicated strong support for the inquiry, proposing that nuclear industrial development could potentially attract tens of billions of dollars in foreign investment to South Australia. He suggested that the storage of spent nuclear fuel and its processing via fast breeder reactors could effectively create a "special economic zone" with spin-off effects including the potential abolition of $4.4 billion in state taxes and the provision of "free power to SA households". He noted that the South Australian Labor Party's Royal Commission represents bipartisan support for an impartial and evidenced based evaluation of the nuclear issue.

Nuclear industrial interests within Australia also welcomed the announcement of the Commission, including Bruce Hundertmark's venture South Australian Nuclear Energy Systems (SANES), the established laser enrichment and technology company SILEX Systems and small modular reactor start-up, SMR Nuclear Technology. French state-owned nuclear industrial company Areva has also demonstrated their eagerness to support the commission.

In March 2015, the French government welcomed the South Australian royal commission and offered access to its nuclear experts during the enquiry. The French Ambassador to Australia Christophe Lecourtier travelled to Adelaide from Canberra to meet with Premier Jay Weatherill and discuss the French nuclear industry.

In June 2015 Vanessa Guthrie from Toro Energy and Mark Chalmers from the Australian Uranium Council voiced their support for the Nuclear Fuel Cycle Royal Commission.

The Australian Financial Review has editorialised strongly in favour of the Royal Commission. An editorial piece on 11 July 2015 proposed that the South Australian community was generally in favour of nuclear industrial development, stating:

"In fact, proceedings to date suggest genuine support of the process by South Australians more interested in jobs and progress than the rabid but loud anti-nuclearites. South Australians want growth and know that subsidised defence industries in the gift of the federal government cannot be banked on."

=== Opposition ===
Immediately following the announcement of the Royal Commission, emeritus Prof. Ian Lowe from Griffith University (and previous President of the Australian Conservation Foundation) suggested that the current inquiry risks retreading old ground already covered by several previous public inquiries and proposals for nuclear industrialisation. Lowe referred to the 2006 UMPNER review's finding that substantial government subsidies would be required to support nuclear industrial development in Australia, and the earlier Fox Report (1976–1978), which drew attention to the problems of nuclear weapons proliferation and the management of high level nuclear waste generated by uranium mining and processing. Lowe concluded:

"Any objective assessment of the state’s (energy) needs in the context of a commitment to sustainable development will favour going forward by expanding the proven capacity of clean renewables, rather than gambling on unproven nuclear fantasies."

On 17 April 2015, Lowe was announced as one of five members of the Nuclear Fuel Cycle Royal Commission Expert Advisory Committee.

The Australian Conservation Foundation has questioned the timing of the royal commission given the current downturn being experienced by the nuclear industry in Australia and globally. They note that the royal commission could represent an attempt to revive the failed bid to establish a nuclear waste repository in South Australia. While they acknowledge the urgent need to move to a low carbon economy, they suggest that the inquiry risks spending significant resources and political capital on a controversial and high risk nuclear industry when South Australia is already leading the nation in renewable energy commercialisation, especially wind power. They suggest that the commission should consider the domestic and international impacts of Australia's involvement in the nuclear cycle, and that it should be "evidence based, rigorous and independent".

Peter Burdon, an academic at the University of Adelaide, has also speculated that the commission is likely to focus on the establishment of a nuclear waste repository in South Australia, most likely on aboriginal land. He notes that the failure of previous Howard government proposal for a waste dump was mostly attributed to opposition from South Australian politicians. However he suggests that the role of the senior aboriginal women's council of Coober Pedy in the defeat of this proposal was also very important.

In March 2015, Professor Stephen Lincoln from South Australian Nuclear Energy Systems discussed a draft proposal for a $7 billion uranium enrichment facility at Whyalla with the Whyalla News. Residents who were interviewed indicated that they disagreed with the proposal and were cynical about the Royal Commission. The Council said it would reserve its judgement until after the Commission had presented its findings, with Mayor Jim Pollock expressing personal reservations regarding potential developments of the nuclear industry in the region.

Further opposition to the expansion of nuclear industries in South Australia has been expressed by environmental and aboriginal activists and organisations since the Commission's announcement. Opponents include: Conservation SA, Medical Association for Prevention of War (MAPW), Friends of the Earth, the Australian Conservation Foundation and the Australian Greens.

Renewable energy advocate Matthew Wright accused the Royal Commission of demonstrating a pro-nuclear bias in order to promote the interests of uranium exploration and mining companies and their shareholders.

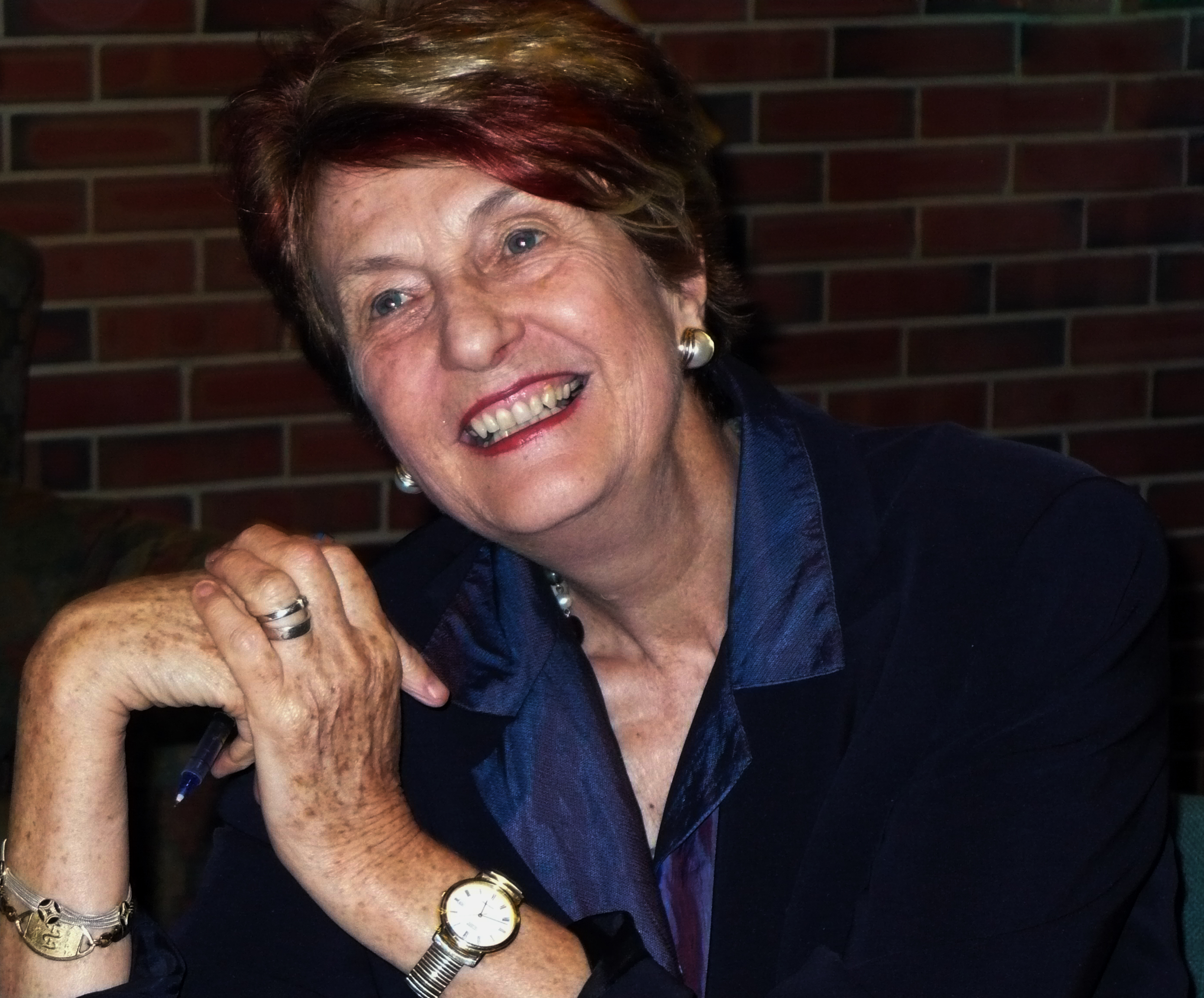
Dr Helen Caldicott

Long-term anti-nuclear advocate, physician and author Dr. Helen Caldicott criticised the establishment of the royal commission stating that the arguments in favour of nuclear energy are "many and specious". She observed that several members of the expert advisory panel have a well known pro-nuclear stance. She also criticised the Royal Commission for not appointing a medical doctor to the Expert Advisory Committee, stating:

"This is a carcinogenic industry that must be halted immediately in the name of public health. The people advocating a nuclear South Australia have no comprehension of genetics, radiation biology, oncology and medicine. Or they are willing to ignore the risks."

== Final report ==
The Final report found that "the future demand for and anticipated costs of nuclear power (including small modular reactors) mean that it is unlikely to be commercially viable in South Australia in the foreseeable future." . The report says that nuclear power is unlikely to be profitable in SA, as is the processing of uranium before export.

However, the report stated that SA could profitably take nuclear waste from other countries and store it locally. The report says that there is presently limited local opposition to mining and exporting uranium in SA, and it advocates the expansion of the uranium industry. The final report recommends the repeal of state and federal prohibitions which currently prevent further development of the nuclear industry in South Australia beyond its current role in the mining and export of uranium oxide concentrates.

== Further consideration ==
On 25 May 2016, a Joint Committee on Findings of the Nuclear Fuel Cycle Royal Commission was appointed, composed of South Australian parliamentarians from four political parties. Dennis Hood was appointed Chair, and its members include Annabel Digance MP, Hon Tom Kenyon MP, Hon Rob Lucas MLC, Hon Mark Parnell MLC, Mr Dan van Holst Pellekaan MP. The Committee received submissions from interested parties prior to 1 July 2016, and heard testimony from a range of witnesses. The Committee was expected to deliver the results of its considerations to the South Australian Parliament and ultimately concluded that no further public money should be spent pursuing the prospect of importing spent nuclear fuel to South Australia.

In October 2017, Nigel McBride from Business SA told InDaily that his organisation would continue to lobby for further investigation of the prospect of importing spent nuclear fuel to South Australia following the next state election.

== See also ==
- Anti-nuclear movement in Australia
- Australian Uranium Association
- Fox Report
- List of inquiries into uranium mining in Australia
- Nuclear industry in South Australia
- Uranium mining in Australia
