= Committee for Economic Development of Australia =

Australian think-tank

The Committee for Economic Development of Australia (CEDA) is an independent, member-based public policy think tank based in Australia. It brings together leaders from business, government, academia and the community to address key economic and social challenges and contribute to public policy debate.

== Foundation ==
The Committee for Economic Development of Australia (CEDA) was formed in 1960 by economist Douglas Copland.

George Le Couteur OBE was president from 1968 until 1974. It was modelled on the US CED (Committee for Economic Development) but is now organised along lines more similar to the US Conference Board and the Conference Board of Canada. It is Australia's third-oldest think-tank, after the Institute of Public Affairs and the Australian Institute of International Affairs.

In 1979, after a debate on CEDA's involvement in lobbying, it established a "Business Roundtable" as an independent entity, which in 1983 was merged into the Business Council of Australia.

== Aims and function ==
The expressed aim of CEDA is to "promote national economic development in a sustainable and socially balanced way". Sydney Morning Herald economics editor Ross Gittins has described CEDA as seeking to "inform the public debate without lobbying".

It describes itself as independent from political parties.

CEDA's work is guided by its Progress 2050 agenda, which focuses on long-term economic and social outcomes for Australia.

== Structure and activities ==
CEDA operates as a member-based organisation, with participants from the public, private, academic and community sectors contributing to its research and policy discussions.

Its activities include producing research reports, hosting events and forums, and facilitating collaboration between stakeholders on key economic and social policy issues.

== Governance and people ==
As of April 2024, Christine Bartlett is chair of CEDA, and Melinda Cilento is CEO.

Neville Norman, later a professor at University of Melbourne, was economic advisor from 1975 to 1992.

John Nieuwenhuysen served as research director in the late 1980s, and became CEO in 1996. He expanded CEDA's collaborative research with Australian universities on issues such as tax and industrial relations reform.

Neil Warren, later a professor at the University of New South Wales, was research director from 1988 to 1990.

== Research approach ==
CEDA mostly offers conclusions that are near the centre of the policy spectrum. It tends to favour market-oriented or at least price-oriented solutions to issues such as water supply and infrastructure.

== See also ==
- Economy of Australia
