= University of Adelaide =

Public university in South Australia

Coordinates: 34°55′09″S 138°36′15″E

The University of Adelaide
- Coat of arms (Note: The coat of arms, which is printed on degree parchments, has been de facto retired for new students starting in 2025. University of Adelaide alumni and continuing students who started their programs on or before 2024 will continue to have the option to graduate with Adelaide University degrees bearing the coat of arms. This excludes University of South Australia students and alumni, who will have access to their existing trademark instead.)
- Latin: Universitas Adelaidensis
- Other name: Adelaide University (Note: Adelaide University was used as a colloquial name since at least 1872, and is now the name of the successor institution formed by the 2026 merger.)
- Former names: Union College (1872–1874)
- Motto: Latin: Sub Cruce Lumen
- Motto in English: "The light (of learning) under the (Southern) Cross"
- Type: Public research university
- Active: 6 November 1874; 152 years ago–31 March 2026
- Accreditation: TEQSA
- Academic affiliations: Group of Eight; APRU; Australian Space Agency; SAHMRI; UniSA; OUA; Universities Australia
- Endowment: A$393.4 million (2023)
- Budget: A$1.09 billion (2023)
- Chancellor: Catherine Branson
- Vice-Chancellor: Peter Høj
- Academic staff: 1,700 (2023)
- Administrative staff: 1,978 (2023)
- Total staff: 3,678 (2023)
- Students: 30,279 (2023)
- Undergraduates: 19,493 bachelor (2023)
- Postgraduates: 7,962 coursework (2023); 2,362 research (2023)
- Other students: 772 (2023)
- Location: North Terrace, Adelaide, South Australia, 5001, Australia
- Campus: Urban and regional with multiple sites
- Colours: Black White
- Nickname: The Blacks
- Sporting affiliations: UniSport; EAEN; UBL
- Mascot: Gus the Black Lion
- Website: adelaide.edu.au

The University of Adelaide (UofA) was a public research university based in Adelaide, South Australia. Established in 1874, it was the third-oldest university in Australia. Its main campus in the Adelaide city centre included many sandstone buildings of historical and architectural significance, such as Bonython Hall. Its royal charter awarded by Queen Victoria in 1881 allowed it to become the second university in the English-speaking world to confer degrees to women. On 5 January 2026, it merged with the neighbouring University of South Australia to form Adelaide University. The antecedent institutions were formally disestablished after 31 March 2026, when both the University of Adelaide Act 1971 and University of South Australia Act 1990 were repealed.

The university was founded at the former Royal South Australian Society of Arts by the Union College and studies were initially conducted at its Institute Building. The society was also the original birthplace of the South Australian Institute of Technology as the School of Mines and Industries. The institute later became the University of South Australia during the Dawkins Revolution following a merger with an advanced college dating back to the School of Art, also founded at the society. The two universities, which then accounted for approximately three-quarters of the state's public university population, agreed to merge in mid-2023. This combined institution was established as Adelaide University (previously a colloquial name for the existing university), with the merged university having been established in 2024 and formally opened in 2026.

The university had four campuses, three in South Australia: its main North Terrace campus in central Adelaide, the Waite campus in Urrbrae, a regional campus in Roseworthy and a study centre in Melbourne, Victoria. Its academic activities were organised into three faculties, which were subdivided into numerous teaching schools. It also had several research subdivisions. In 2023, the university had a total revenue of A$1.13 billion, with A$334.15 million from research grants and funding. It was a member of the Group of Eight, an association of research-intensive universities in Australia, and the Association of Pacific Rim Universities.

Notable alumni of the university included the first female prime minister of Australia, two presidents of Singapore, the first astronaut born in Australia and the first demonstrator of nuclear fusion. It was also associated with five Nobel laureates, constituting one-third of Australia's total Nobel laureates, 117 Rhodes scholars and 168 Fulbright scholars. It had a significant impact on the public life of South Australia, having educated many of the state's earliest businesspeople, lawyers, medical professionals and politicians. It had also been associated with the development of penicillin, space exploration, sunscreen, the military tank, Wi-Fi, polymer banknotes and X-ray crystallography, and the study of viticulture and oenology.

== History ==
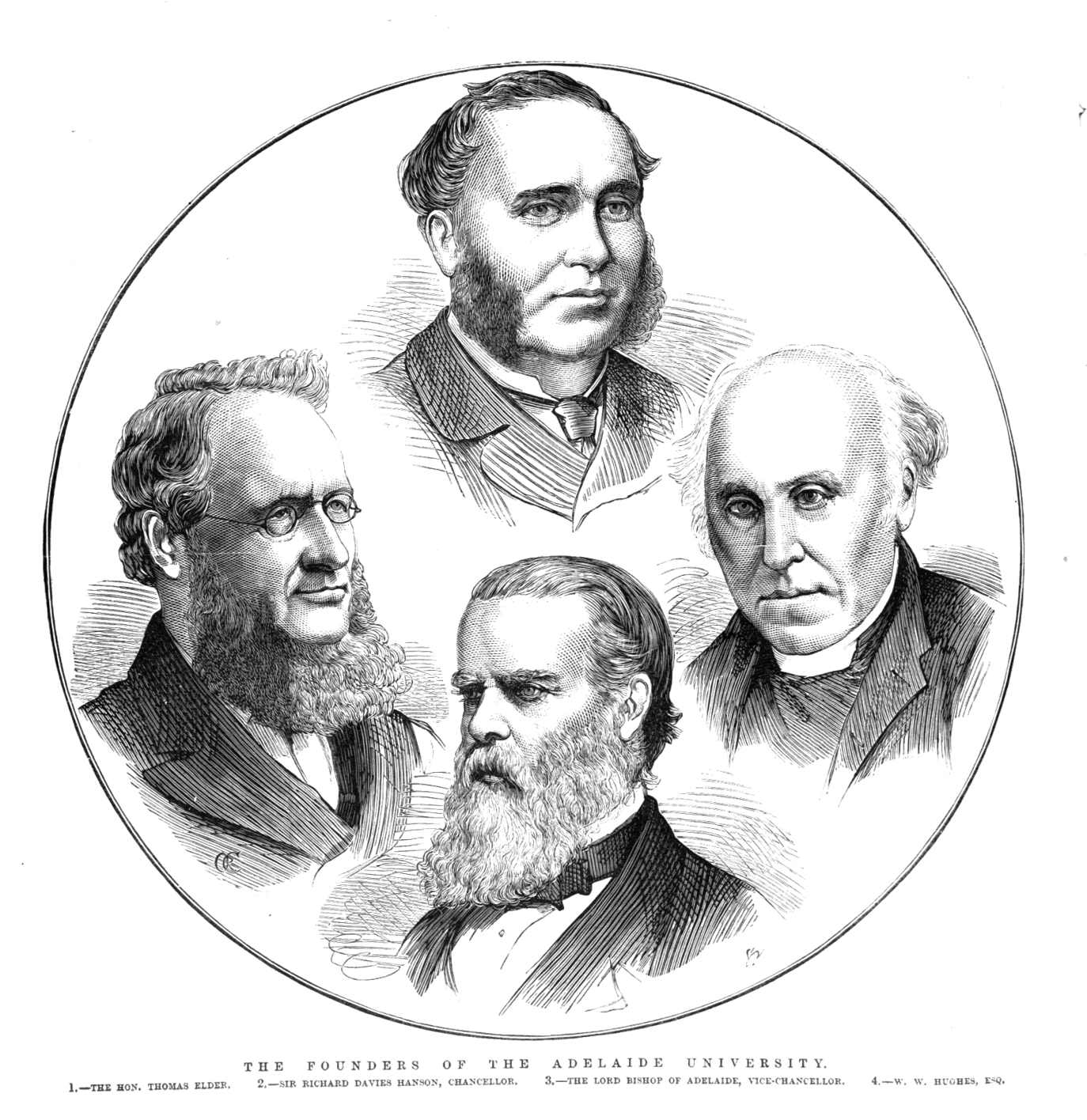
The founders of the University of Adelaide (1875 engraving)

=== Foundation ===
The history of the university dates back to the Union College established in 1872 to provide education to aspiring Protestant ministers who were previously required to travel to the United Kingdom. It provided education in the natural sciences, mathematics, English literature and theological studies of the Greek Testament. The college approached Scottish-born pastoralist Walter Watson Hughes with the proposal for a then-called Adelaide University with a request for endowment towards its creation. Following an agreement, the Adelaide University Association was established by the Union College on 23 September 1872 to manage the creation of the university.

The University of Adelaide, which is named after its founding city namesake to Queen Adelaide, was formally established on 6 November 1874 following the passage of The Adelaide University Act of 1874 through the South Australian parliament. The parliament also provided a 2 hectare (5 acre) land grant for a campus. Its royal charter, which was granted by Queen Victoria in 1881, allowed the university to confer degrees to women. Its early benefactors, many of whom Scottish immigrants, made large donations to develop the university that are now worth tens of millions adjusted for inflation.

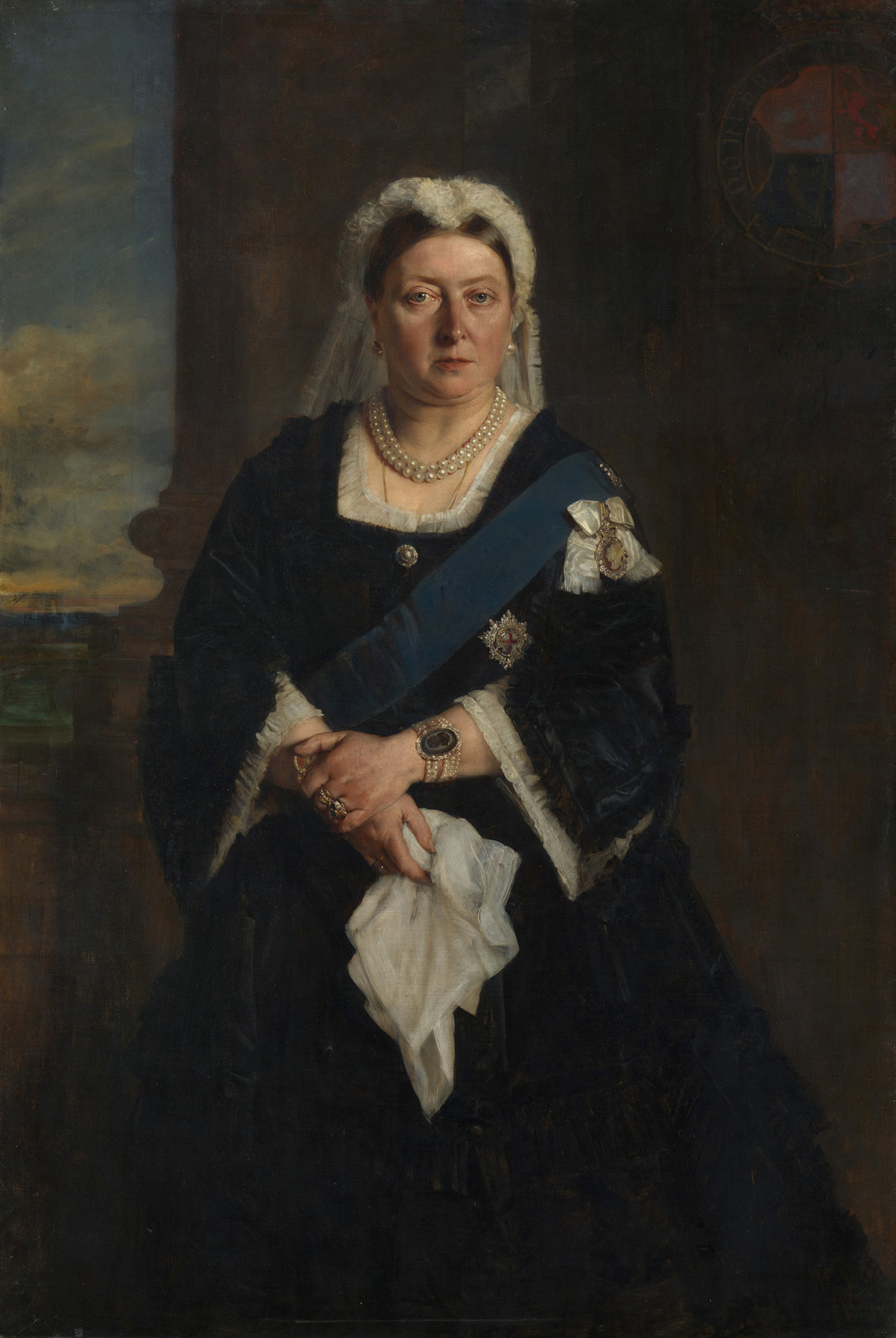
The royal charter grant by Queen Victoria allowed women to study at the university

It was founded with the backing of its first benefactor Walter Hughes and Thomas Elder, also a Scottish-born pastoralist and another founder of the university, who each donated £20,000 towards the association. The university initially occupied the South Australian Institute Building prior to the construction of the University Building which housed the entire university at the time. Elder also bequeathed an additional £65,000 in his will following his death in 1897 of which £20,000 were allocated to set up the Elder Conservatorium of Music. Other donors include Scottish philosopher William Mitchell who also taught literature and psychology, established many teaching schools and served as vice-chancellor and chancellor of the institution. The University Building, now the chancellery, was later renamed to the Mitchell Building in his honour.

According to its founding Act, the university was intended as a secular institution to "promote sound learning in the Province of South Australia" to be "open to all classes and denominations of Her Majesty's subjects". It commenced its first class, a Latin lecture towards the Bachelor of Arts, in March 1876 following its inauguration at the Adelaide Town Hall. Its first chancellor was former premier Richard Hanson and its first vice-chancellor was Anglican bishop Augustus Short. Its first graduate was Thomas Ainslie Caterer, who graduated in 1879 with a Bachelor of Arts. In 1882, it was also the first university in Australia to provide degree programs in science and its faculty of arts was inaugurated in 1887. Its Adelaide Law School was established in 1883 as Australia's second law school, its medical school in 1885 and its Adelaide Business School in 1902 as the country's first business school. They have produced some of Australia's earliest businesspeople, lawyers, medical professionals and politicians.

willing and ordaining that Degrees in Arts, Medicine, Law, Science and Music conferred by the University of Adelaide upon any person, male or female, should be recognised as academical distinctions and rewards of merit and be entitled to rank, precedence and consideration

— William Jervois in a 1882 speech paraphrasing Queen Victoria's royal charter

Another early benefactor Robert Barr Smith, who had previously studied under financial hardship in Scotland and served on the University Council for 19 years, had long desired for education to be accessible to all students in Adelaide. In 1913, Robert wrote at the age of 89 that "tho' in its vigorous and lusty youth," the university was poorly endowed and constructed on little land. His donations included a combined £9000 towards books for the then-struggling university library and £500 towards radiation research by Lawrence and William Henry Bragg who later won the 1915 Nobel Prize in Physics.

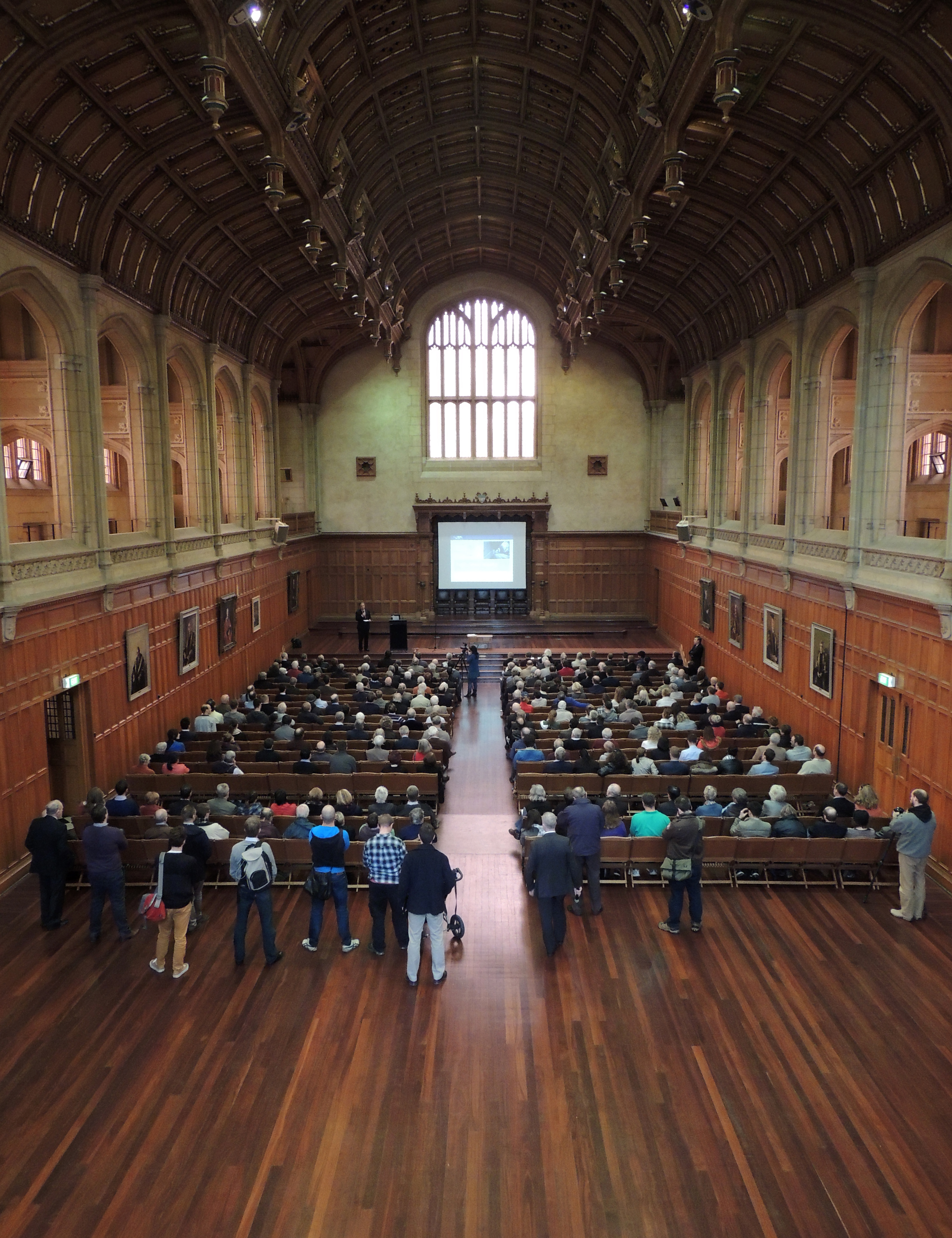
The interior of Bonython Hall, used for graduations, during a forum on nuclear energy

Bonython Hall, the great hall of the university, was built in 1936 following a donation of over £50,000 from the owner of The Advertiser newspaper, John Langdon Bonython, who was inspired following his visit to the Great Hall of the University of Sydney. The hall, which is used during graduation ceremonies among other events, was designed by architect Louis Laybourne-Smith based on medieval great halls in a Gothic Revival architecture style inspired by the ancient universities in Europe.

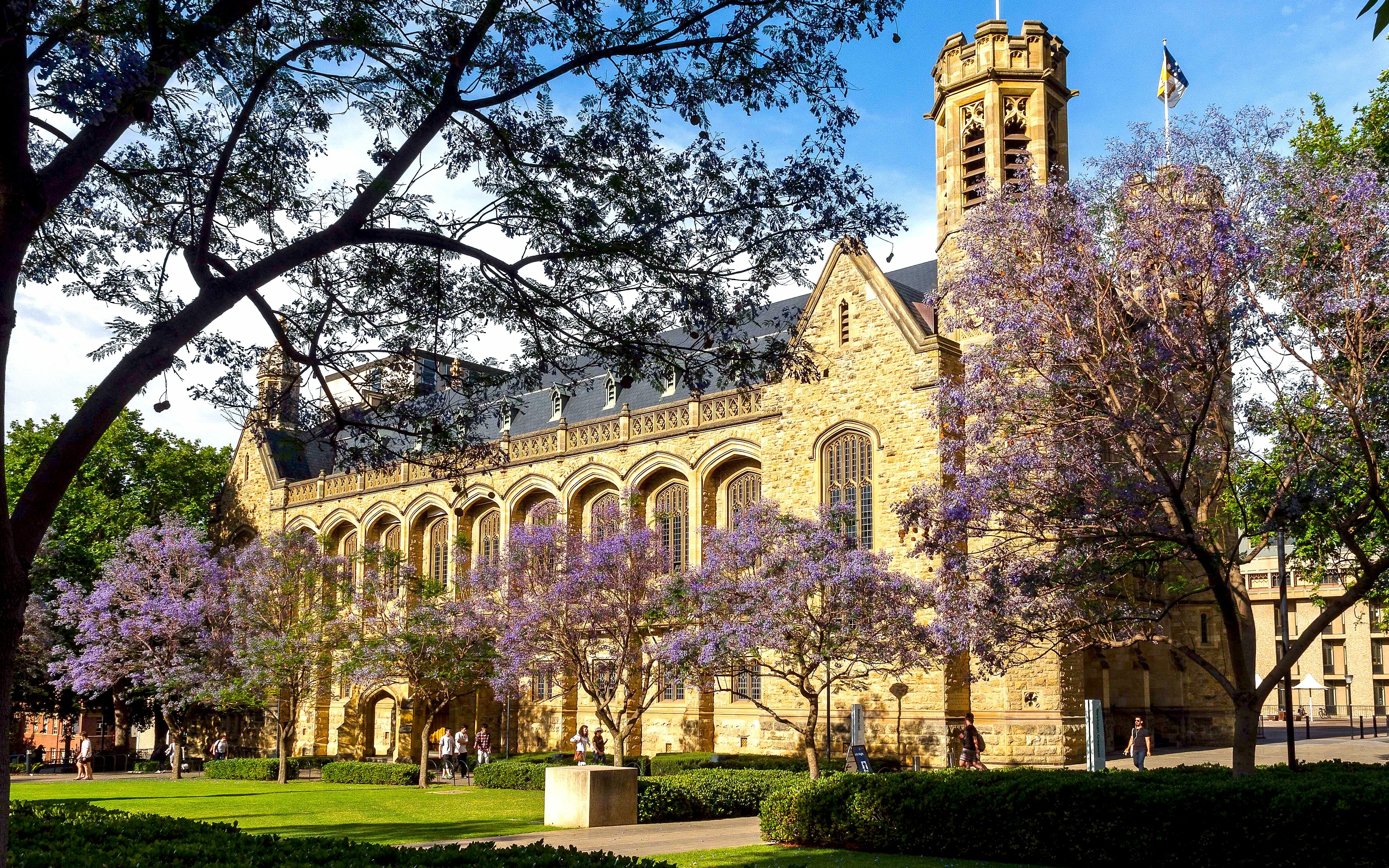
Bonython Hall, inspired by the Great Hall of the University of Sydney and ancient universities

The institution was the third of its kind on the Australian continent after the Universities of Sydney and Melbourne, which then educated solely men. The university, which allowed women to study alongside men since its commencement including eligibility for all academic prizes and honours, became the second university in the English-speaking world following the University of London in 1878 to formally admit women on equal terms as men in 1881. This was following a royal charter granted by Queen Victoria that year, which allowed for women to be conferred degrees. This has contributed to its long history of achieving notable milestones and firsts for women's rights in higher education.

In 1991, it formally opened two additional campuses in Greater Adelaide outside of the city centre. These included the Waite and Roseworthy campuses, though the university operated at the Waite site since at least 1924 as the Waite Agricultural Research Institute. The Roseworthy campus was the former Roseworthy Agricultural College which, although affiliated with the university since 1905, was an independent institution prior to their merger. Additionally, the university previously operated research facilities across 5 hectares (12 acres) in Thebarton approximately 3 km (1.9 mi) north of the campus until 2020 when it was sold for housing development. The flames for several summer Olympic Games, among other sporting events, were developed there with the now-called FCT Flames.

=== Neighbouring amalgamations ===
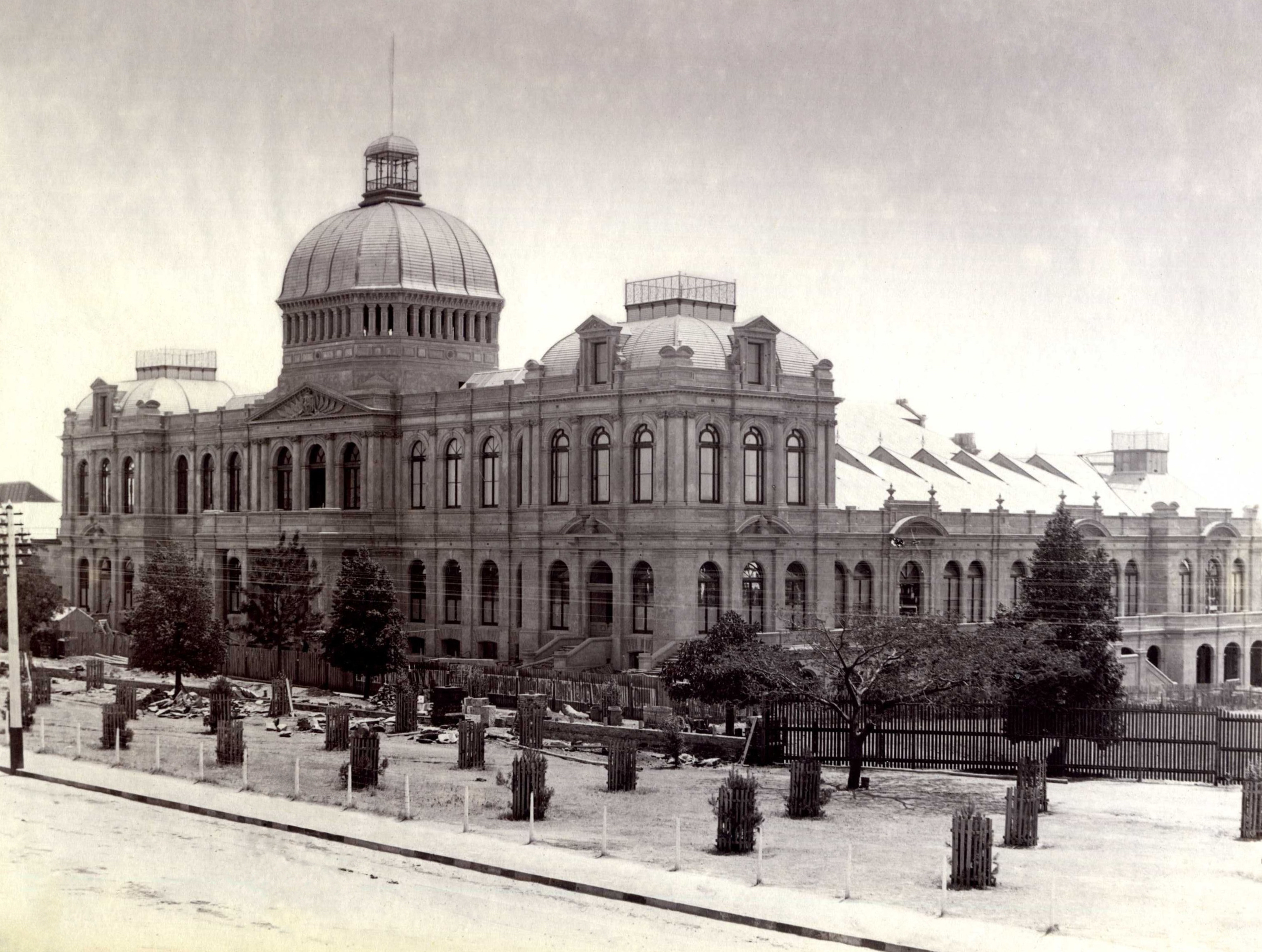
The now-demolished Jubilee Exhibition Building in 1885

The SA School of Art was founded in 1856 by the former Royal South Australian Society of Arts, predating the university which was also established there. The independent art school, which went through many name changes, resided for most of its history at the Jubilee Exhibition Building which was later transferred to the university in 1929. It remained on the campus until 1962 when the building was demolished to make way for several university buildings.

The Jubilee Exhibition Building was also the birthplace of the South Australian Institute of Technology which was established in 1889 as the SA School of Mines and Industries. It moved to the neighbouring Brookman Building in 1903, named after the Scottish-born businessman George Brookman who contributed £15,000 towards its construction. The institution acted de facto as part of the university while remaining legally distinct. The relationship was expanded in 1903 with the two institutions formally agreeing to combine teaching, laboratories and examinations across fields of engineering and sciences. Despite the university later establishing its own faculty of engineering in 1937, the reciprocal relationship remained intertwined to the University Council and studies completed at the institute were recognised as equivalent studies eligible for credit towards university courses. The institution expanded into the site of the former Adelaide Technical High School in 1963, to the regional city of Whyalla in 1962 and to the Adelaide suburb of Mawson Lakes as The Levels in 1972. In 1965, it was designated an advanced college which initiated an expansion in the variety of courses available.

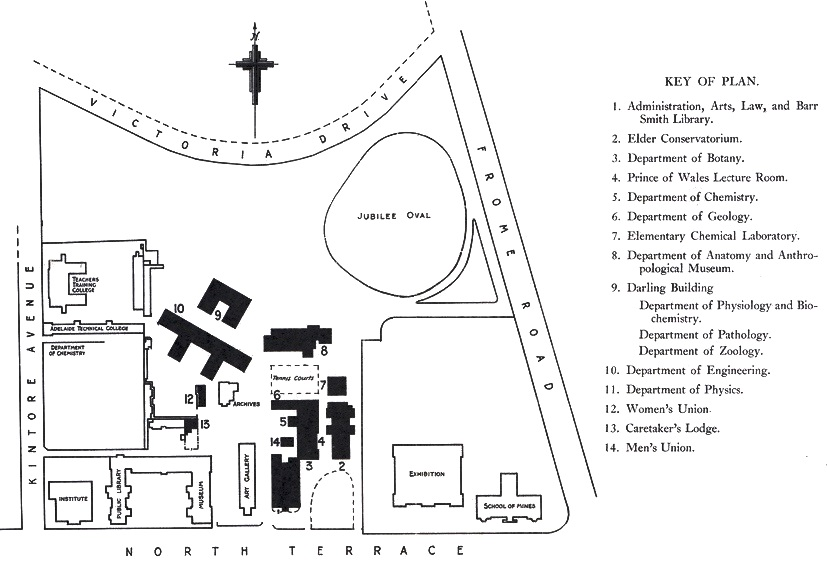
State of the university and its surrounding institutions in 1926

The Adelaide Teachers College, which changed names and shifted locations multiple times throughout its existence, was established in 1876. Despite not being located at the university campus until 1900, students from the institution attended university lectures since at least 1878. In 1921, it renamed to the Adelaide Teachers College, in line with other interstate teachers colleges. Despite offers from the university to take control of the college, which was heavily integrated into the university, the Education Department retained administrative authority throughout its early history. The Hartley Building, named after former vice-chancellor John Anderson Hartley, was built as its permanent home in 1927.

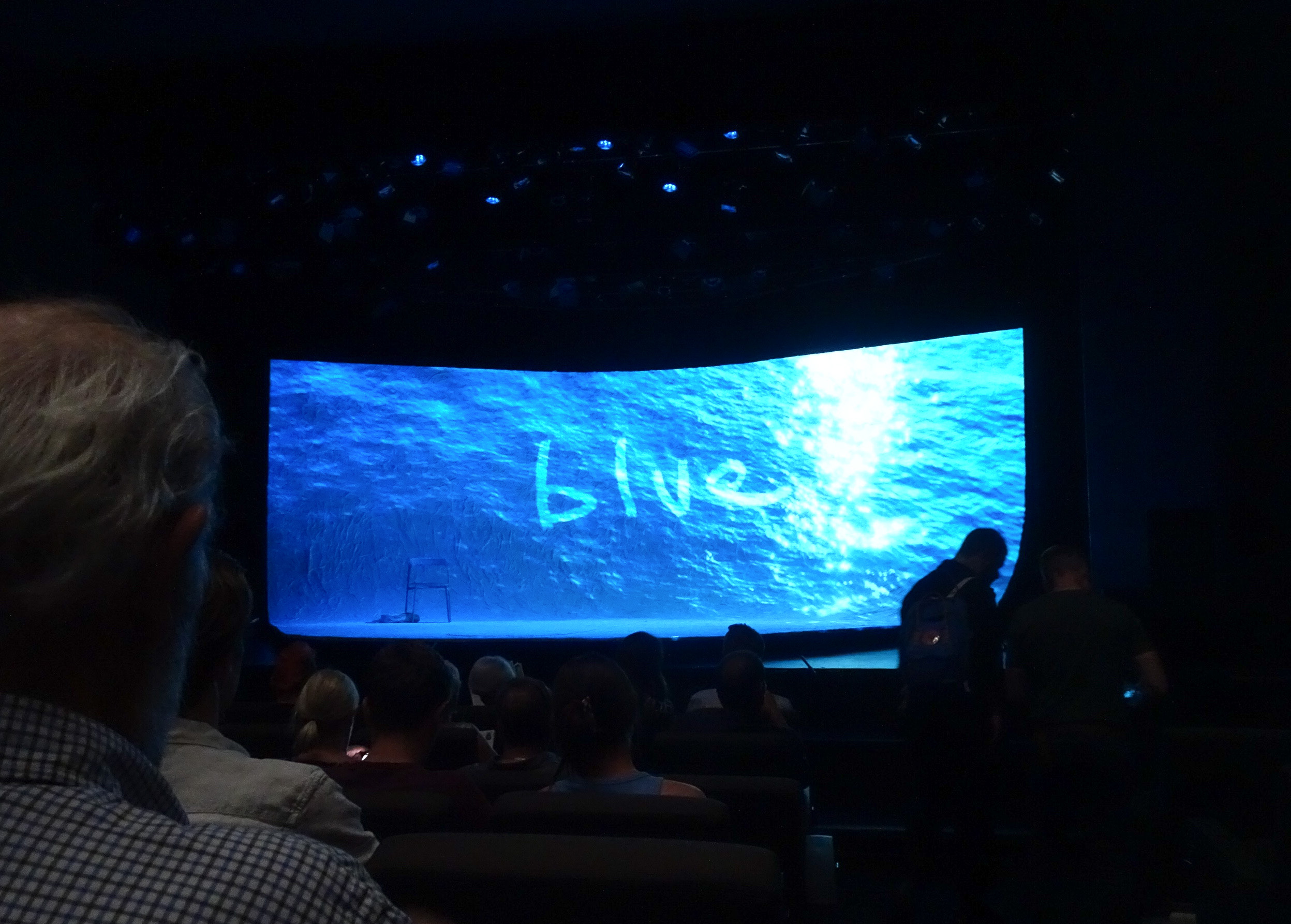
The Scott Theatre, also part of the former teachers' college, is the largest lecture hall.

It continued constructing new buildings such as the Scott Theatre, Madley and Schulz buildings and eventually renamed to the Adelaide College of the Arts and Education. It also established additional teachers colleges in other parts of the city including Magill. Following a series of mergers, the colleges expanded to become advanced colleges which all later amalgamated with the original mother college to become the South Australian College of Advanced Education in 1982. The combined institution continued its presence alongside the university as its City campus and maintained joint teaching, facilities and committees. The campus merged with the university in 1991.

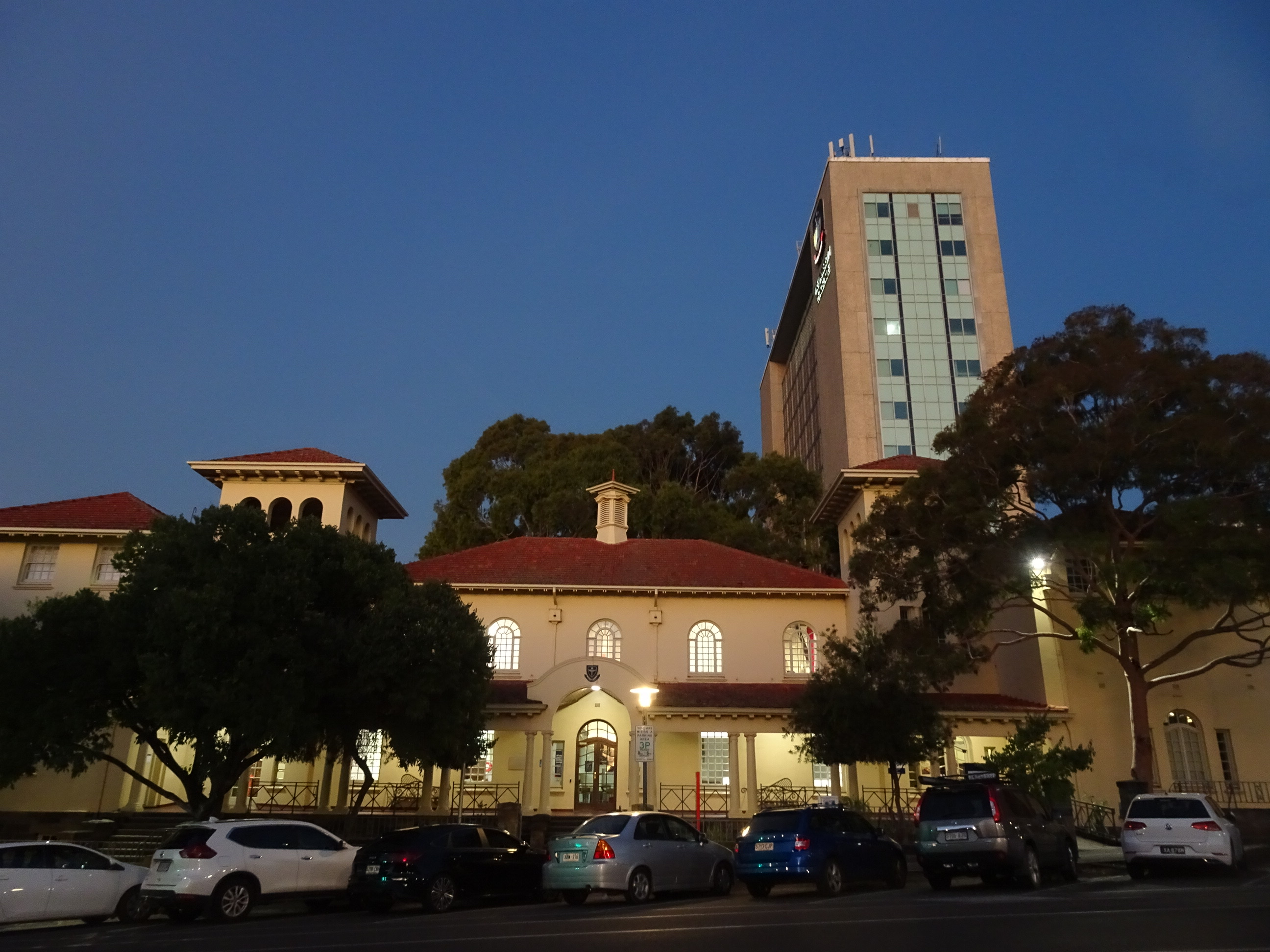
The Hartley Building was the first to be purpose-built for the Adelaide Teachers College.

Stronger demand for advanced college places throughout the country resulted from a broadening appeal of higher education beyond the traditionally elite education provided by the universities. Advanced colleges were originally designed to complement universities, forming a binary system modelled on that of the United Kingdom. It was originally created by the Menzies government following World War II on the advice of a committee led by physicist Leslie H. Martin, during a period of high population growth and corresponding demand for secondary and tertiary education. This sector ceased to exist when, between 1989 and 1992, the Hawke-Keating government implemented the sweeping reforms of Education Minister John Dawkins that dismantled the binary system. The states, eager for increased education funding, merged the colleges either with existing universities or with each other to form new universities. Following its expansion and increasing autonomy from the university, the South Australian Institute of Technology was given the option to merge with either TAFE South Australia or the South Australian College of Advanced Education. It chose to merge with the latter advanced college resulting in the establishment of the University of South Australia, which continues to remain neighbours with the university.

=== Ongoing merger with the University of South Australia ===
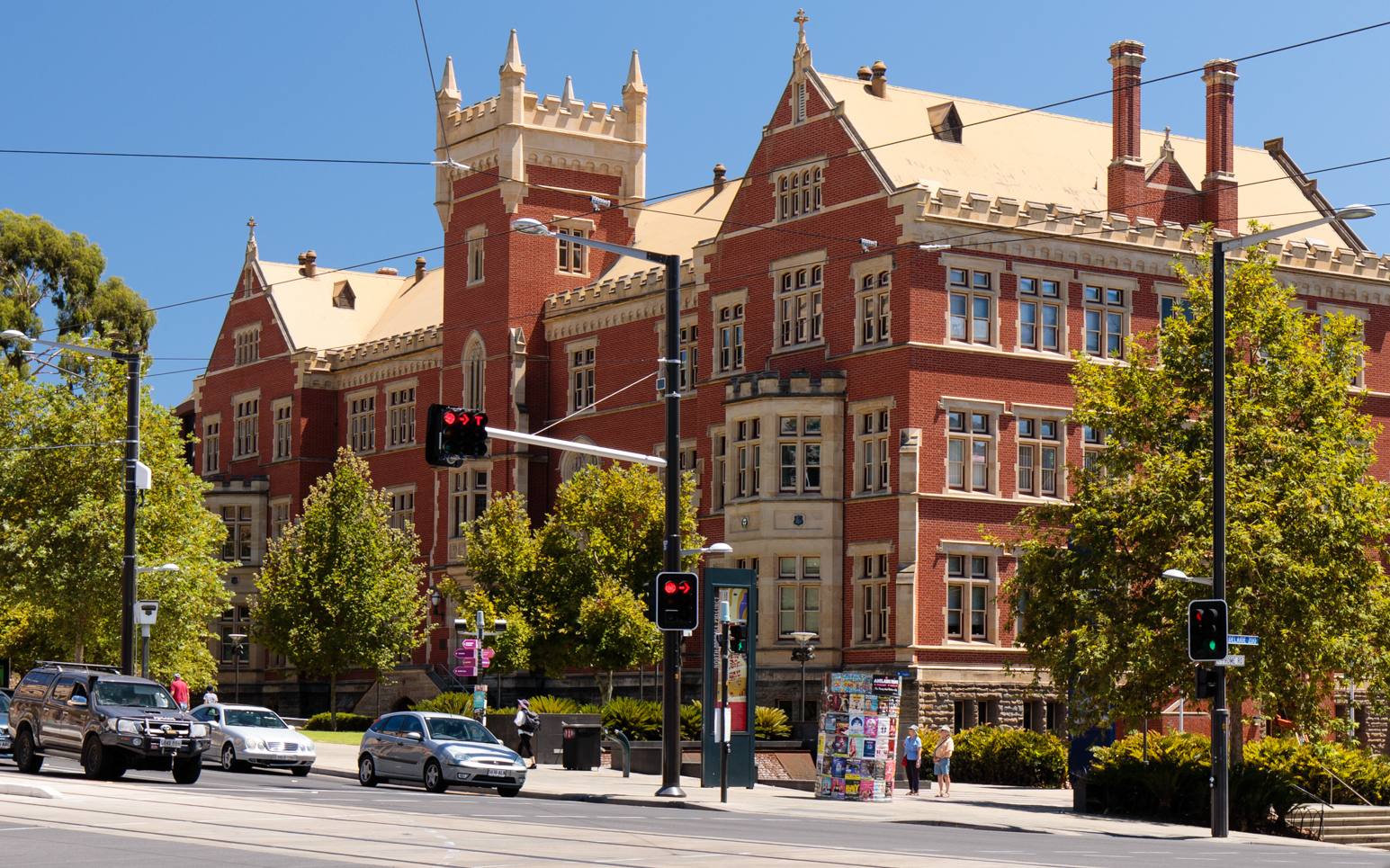
The University of South Australia's Brookman Building located next to Bonython Hall

The University of South Australia is the state's third public university, a continuation of the former South Australian Institute of Technology that merged with most of the remaining SACAE, and maintained their presence next to the University of Adelaide, in the suburbs of Mawson Lakes and Magill and in the regional city of Whyalla. Its expansion over the next few decades, including to sites on the west end of North Terrace, and broadening fields of studies contributed to its status as the state's largest university by student population. It also became the second-largest university nationally by number of online students, either in the state or from other parts of the country, and expanded to Mount Gambier in 2005.

In June 2018, the University of Adelaide and University of South Australia began discussions regarding the possibility of a merger. The proposition was dubbed a "super uni" by then South Australian premier, Steven Marshall, and Simon Birmingham, but the merger was called off in October 2018 by the University of South Australia, which was less keen. Vice-chancellor David Lloyd, in an email to University of South Australia staff, claimed that the amalgamation lacked a compelling case. This statement was contradicted by the University of Adelaide's chancellor who said that the merger continues to be in the state's best interests and a spokesperson for the university added that it was still open to future talks. Following the release of several internal FOI documents retrieved by ABC News, it was later revealed that the merger talks failed due to disagreements on the post-merger institution's leadership structure. The name Adelaide University of South Australia was agreed upon by both universities and Chris Schacht, who previously served on the University of Adelaide Council, alleged that the merger talks failed due to disagreement on which vice-chancellor would replace the other following their amalgamation.

In early 2022, the topic of a merger was raised again by the new state government led by premier Peter Malinauskas, which proposed setting up an independent commission to investigate the possibility of a merger between the state's three public universities should they decline. He had made an election promise to take a heavy-handed approach towards the merger to reduce students departing to higher-ranking institutions on the east coast and to improve the state's ability to attract international students and researchers. At the time, staff's opinions were evenly divided on the idea of the commission. Following the appointment of merger advocate Peter Høj as University of Adelaide vice-chancellor, both universities announced that a merger would once again be considered. The universities began a feasibility study into a potential merger at the end of the year. The invitation to merger negotiations was rejected by Flinders University, the state's third public university.

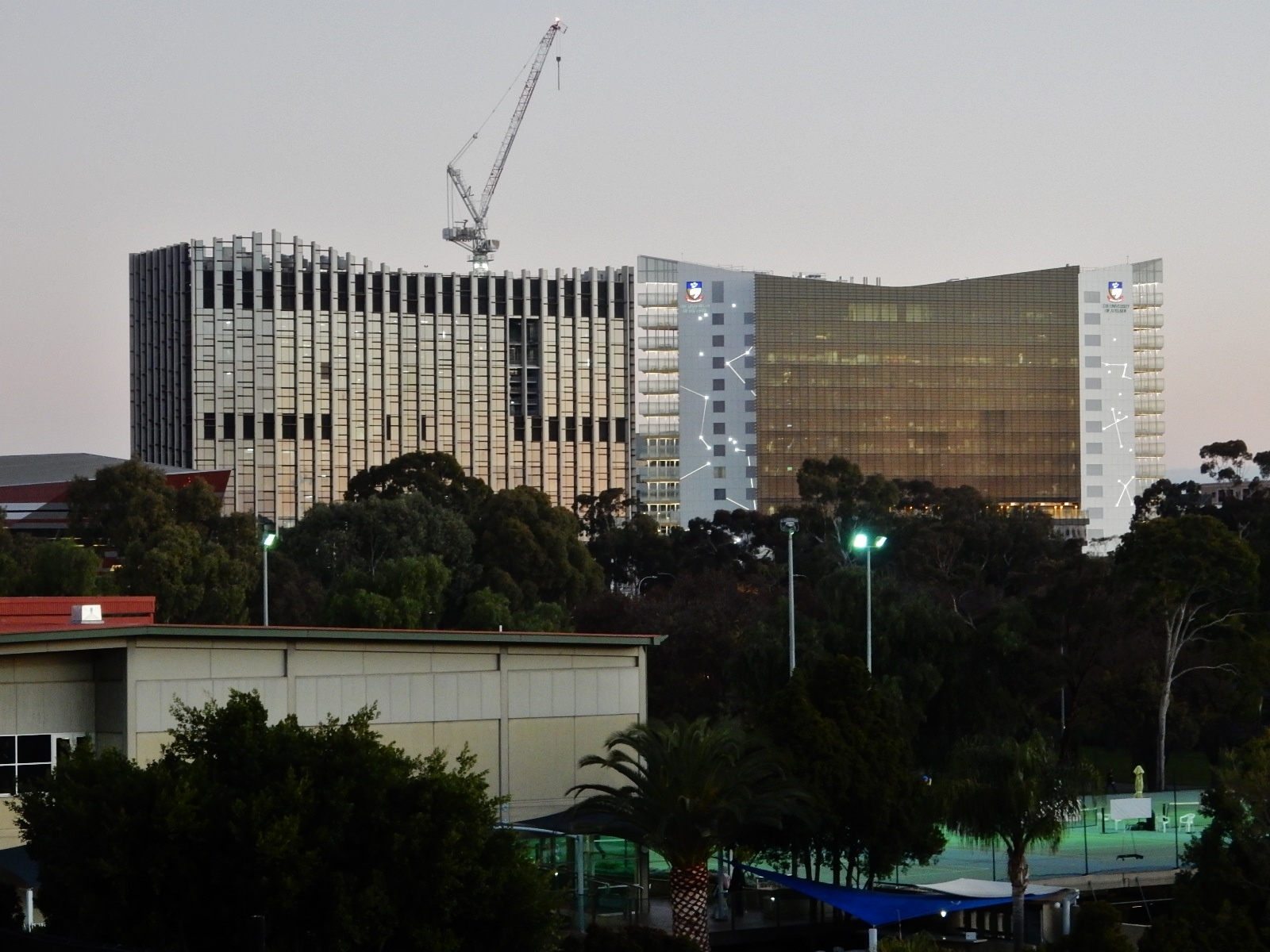
The University of Adelaide (right) is set to merge with the University of South Australia (left) by 1 January 2026.

The agreement for the merger was reached on 1 July 2023 by the two universities, which then accounted for approximately two-thirds of the state's public university population, in consultation with the South Australian Government. The rationale for the amalgamation was a larger institutional scale may be needed in order to increase the universities' ranking positions, ability to secure future research income and a net positive impact on the state economy. The two universities argued that by combining their expertise, resources and finances into a single institution, they can be more financially viable, with stronger teaching and research outcomes. Support for the merger among existing staff were mixed, with a National Tertiary Education Union SA survey showing that only a quarter were in favour of the amalgamation. Warren Bebbington, who previously served as vice-chancellor at the University of Adelaide, described the proposed institution as a "lumbering dinosaur" in reference to its timing during an ongoing federal review of the higher education sector. Vice-chancellor Colin Stirling described plans to provide the new institution with A$300 million in research funding and scholarships as "unfair" to students who choose to study at Flinders University. The combined figure was later revised to A$464.5 million to include land purchases, with an additional A$40 million research fund set up for Flinders University.

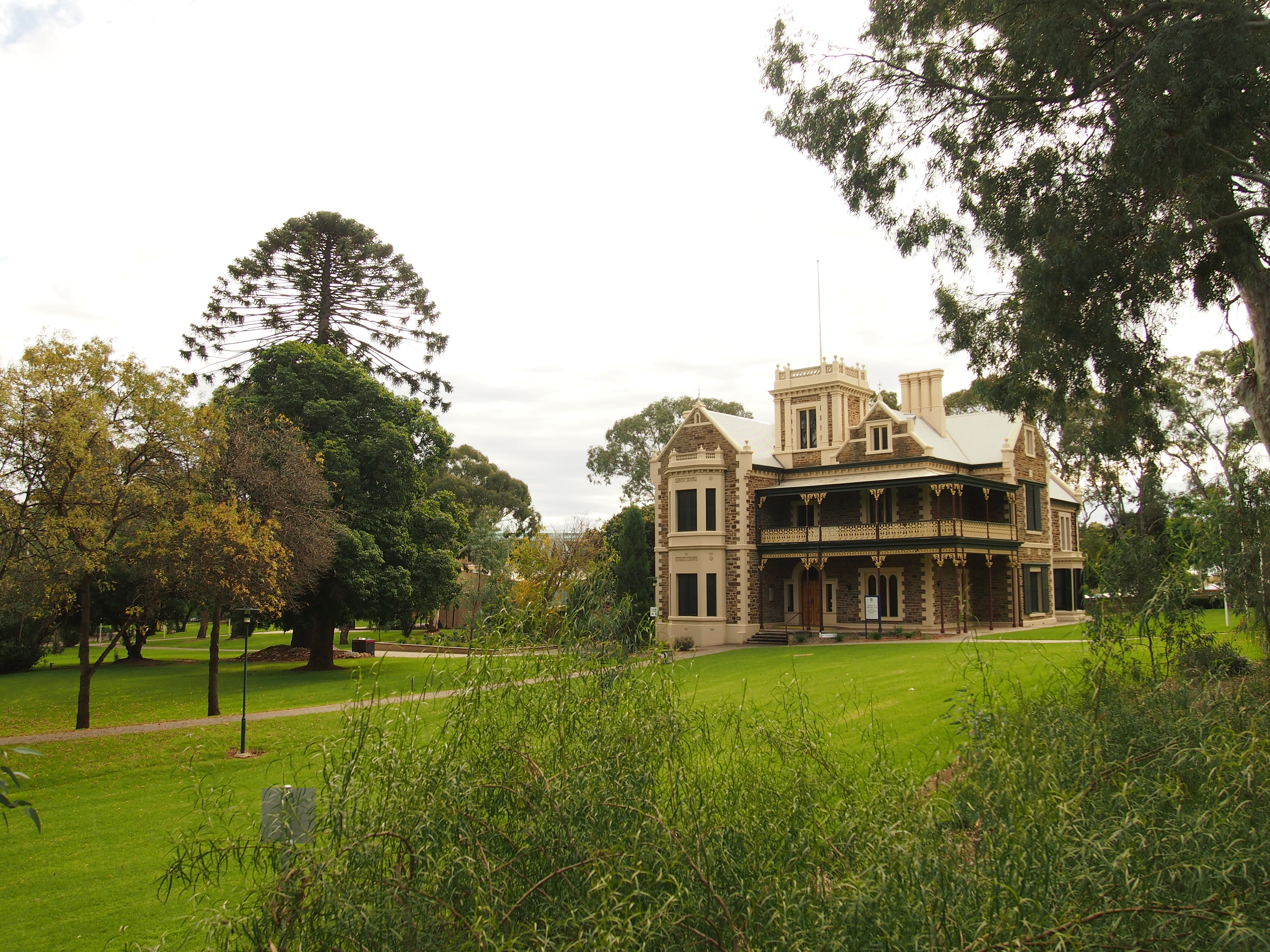
The Magill campus is one of two UniSA campuses where land will be sold for development.

In November 2023, legislation passed state parliament enabling the creation of the new university to be named Adelaide University, previously a colloquial name used by the University of Adelaide. An application for self-accreditation authority was submitted to the Tertiary Education Quality and Standards Agency (TEQSA) on 15 January 2024, which was needed for the institution to offer courses that issue qualifications. Following approval on 22 May 2024, students starting studies at the pre-merger institutions from 2025 onwards will be issued degree certificates from Adelaide University. Students enrolled on or prior to 2024 will also be able to opt in adding antecedent institutions' names and logos on their parchments. The combined institution is expected to become operational by January 2026, with an additional transitional period extending to 2034. It is projected to have 70,000 students at launch, with one-in-four students being international students, and contribute approximately A$4.7 billion to the Australian economy annually. The amalgamation has been subject to mixed reactions.

== Campuses and buildings ==
=== Adelaide ===
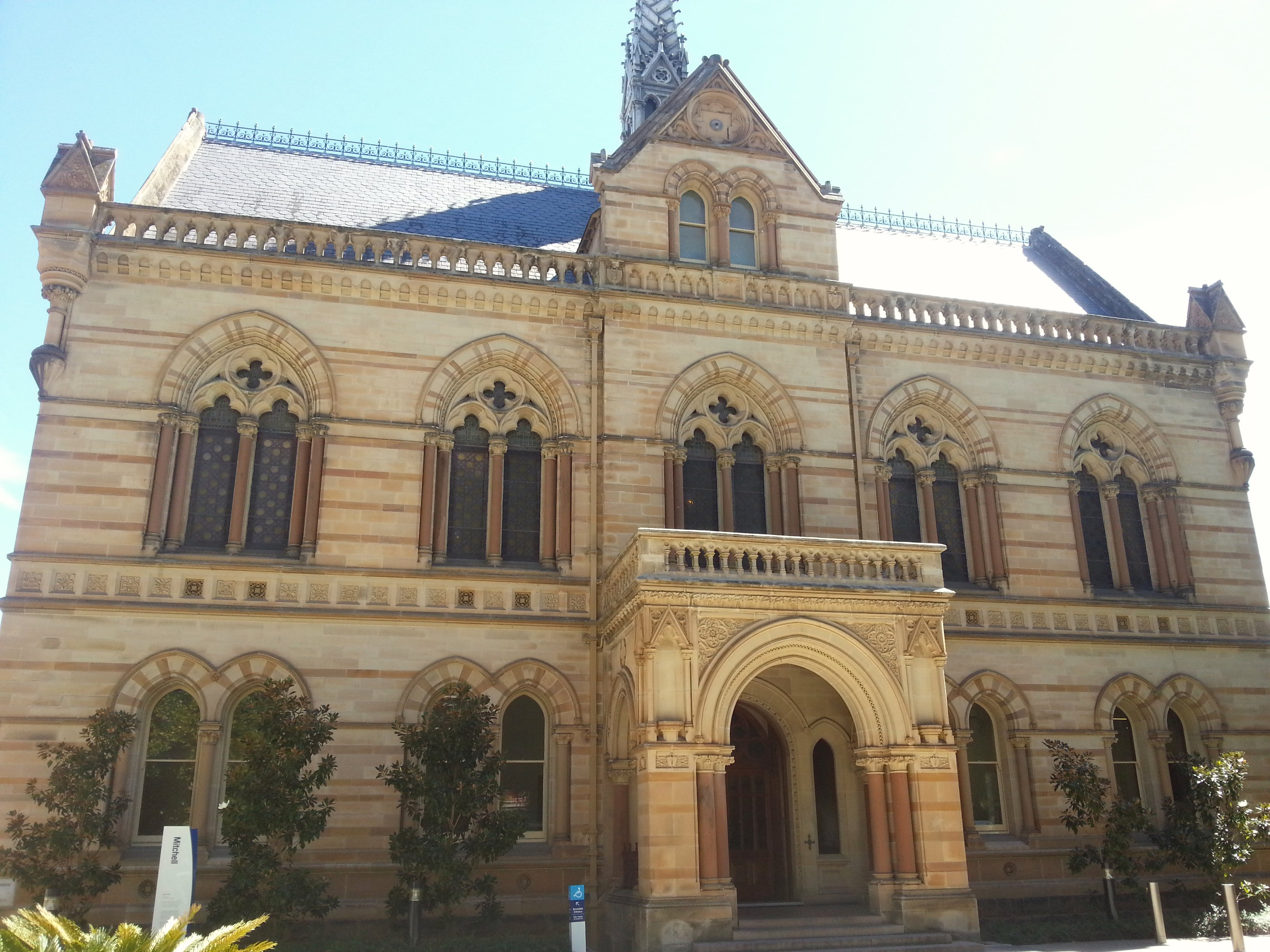
The Mitchell Building, formerly the University Building, is the oldest building on campus.

The primary campus of the university is located on North Terrace in the Adelaide city centre, one of four terraces bounding the inner city's central business district. It is co-located on its west with the historical Royal South Australian Society of Arts which included the Art Gallery of South Australia, the South Australian Museum and the State Library of South Australia. Built in the Gothic Revival architecture style in 1882, the Mitchell Building is the oldest building on the campus. It was called the University Building until 1961 when it was renamed after William Mitchell. The Barr Smith Library is the main library on the site and is notable for its large reading room. On the western border, the campus is planned to merge with the neighbouring City East campus of the University of South Australia and the City West campus on the west end of the terrace to form the combined Adelaide City campus following the merger.

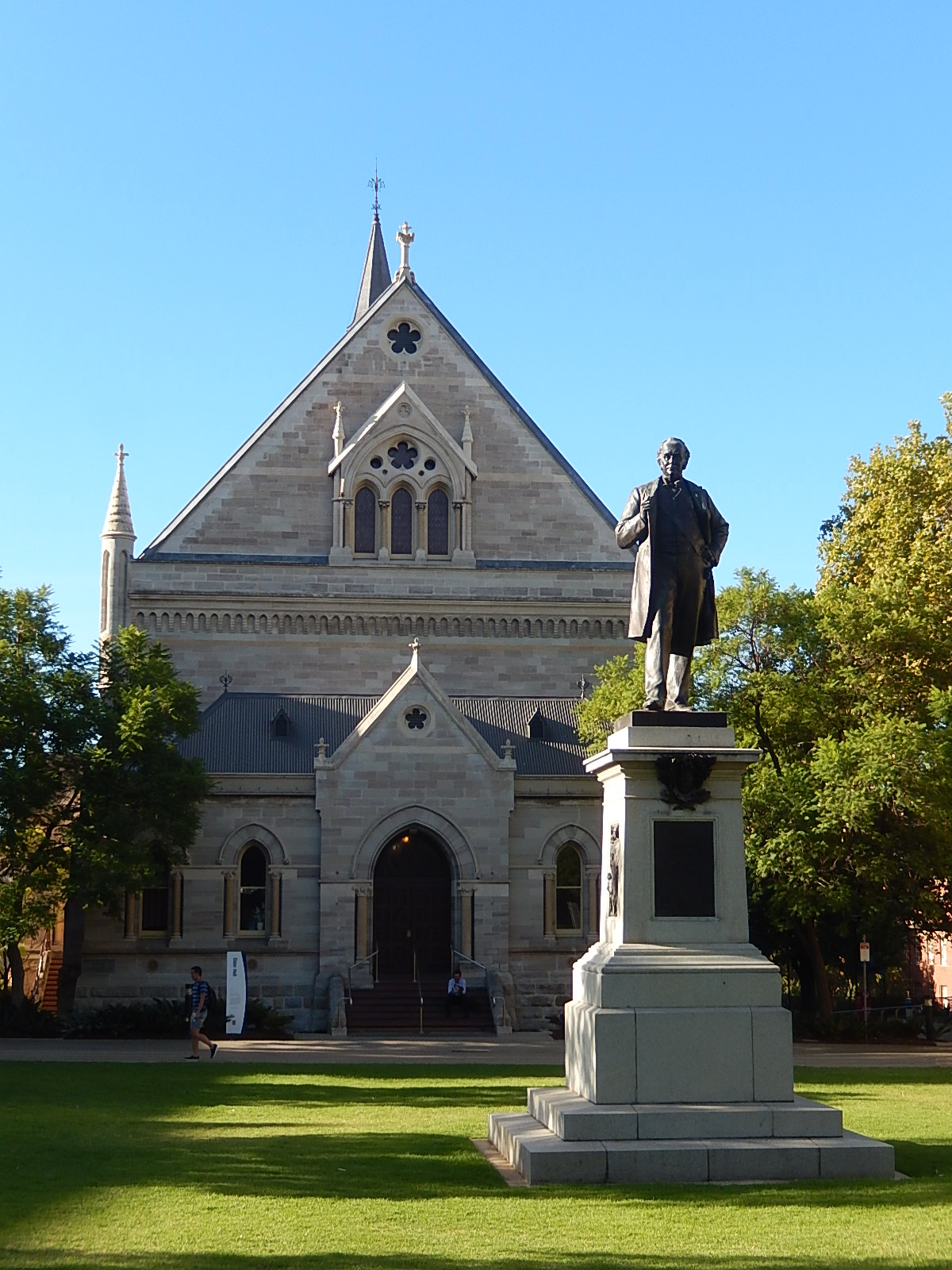
Elder Hall, named after early donor Thomas Elder, integrates freestone from Mount Gambier.

Bonython Hall, the great hall used during graduation ceremonies, is a prominent building facing the terrace. The hall takes inspiration from the Great Hall of the University of Sydney and is also constructed in the Gothic Revival architecture style to resemble the medieval halls used by the ancient universities in Europe. In between it and the Mitchell Building, which both face the terrace, is the Elder Hall which is its oldest great hall. It is a large concert hall that is used by the Elder Conservatorium of Music among others and, along with Bonython Hall, both feature large organs.

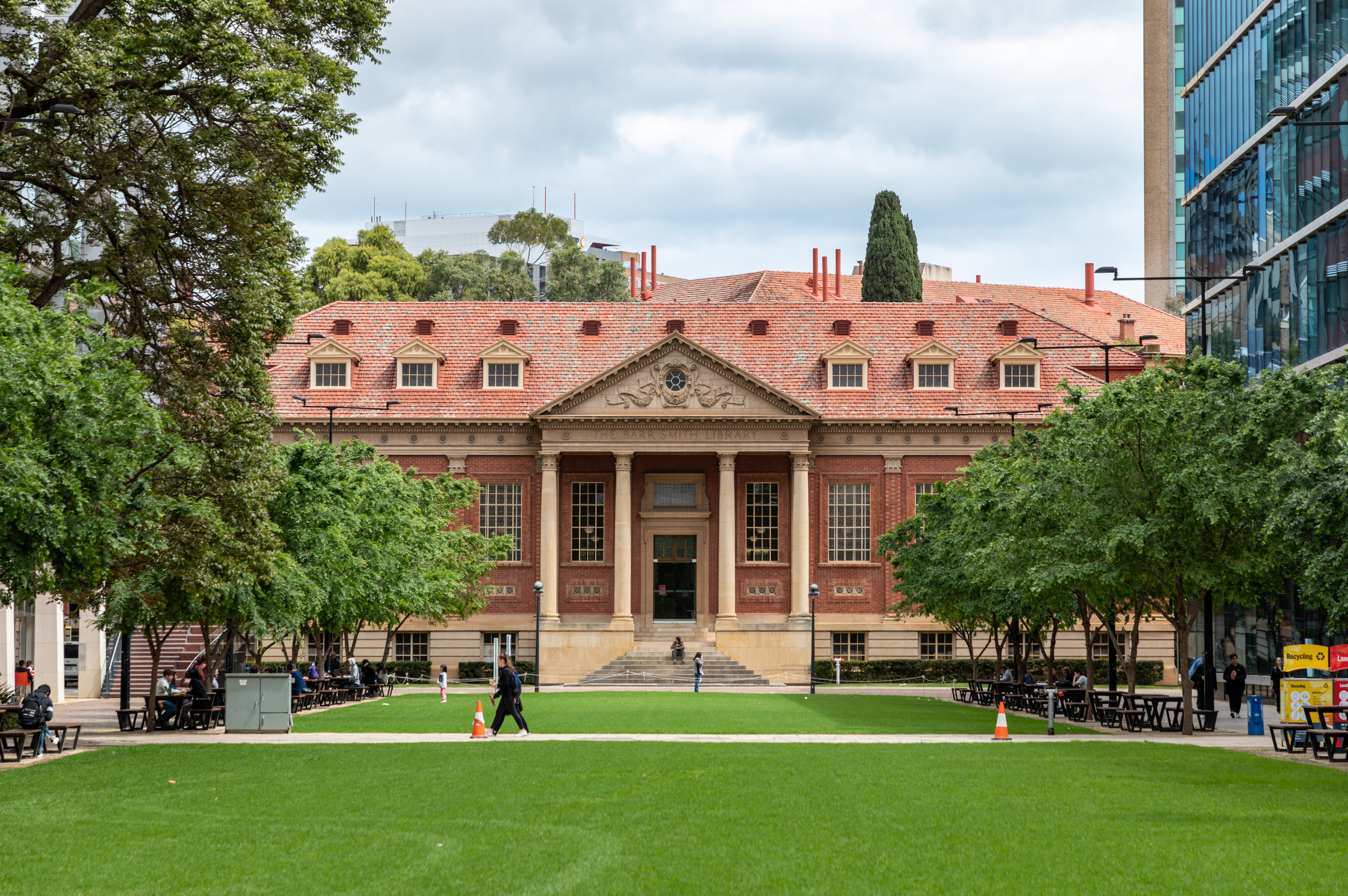
The Barr Smith Library on the main Adelaide campus

The university also has other venues including the Scott Theatre, Little Theatre and the College Green. The Scott Theatre is the largest lecture theatre on site and is often hired out for performances of various kinds such as the Adelaide Fringe events. It features two revolving stages and a seating capacity of 635 people. The Little Theatre is located in the Cloisters and is primarily used for dramatic performances by the Theatre Guild. The College Green stretches from the Cloisters across the lawns down to Victoria Drive, next to the River Torrens. It hosts various social events throughout the year including parties, live bands, DJs and open-air cinema among others. It was created in response to the impact of social distancing restrictions owing to the COVID-19 pandemic in Australia, which hit many live music venues.

The Napier and Ligertwood Buildings were built following the demolition of the Jubilee Exhibition Building in 1962. They are named after Mellis Napier and George Ligertwood who were both former chancellors. The Mawson Building (originally Mawson Laboratories) was named after geologist and Antarctic explorer Sir Douglas Mawson, who taught at the university from 1905 (professor from 1921) until his retirement in 1952. The building was completed in 1953. The Tate Museum, which houses the Mawson Institute for Antarctic Research (founded 1959), and Mawson Geo Centre are located in this building.

Some other notable buildings include the Ingkarni Wardli Building, Darling Building, Hartley Building, and the Helen Mayo North and South Buildings. The A$100 million Braggs Building, named after two Nobel laureates associated with the university, was built in 2013 and features a large number of cross-disciplinary scientific research facilities. The Adelaide University Footbridge was constructed in 1937 following a decade of delays during the Great Depression. The footbridge, which crosses the River Torrens, features cast iron balustrading that is a popular location for love locks.

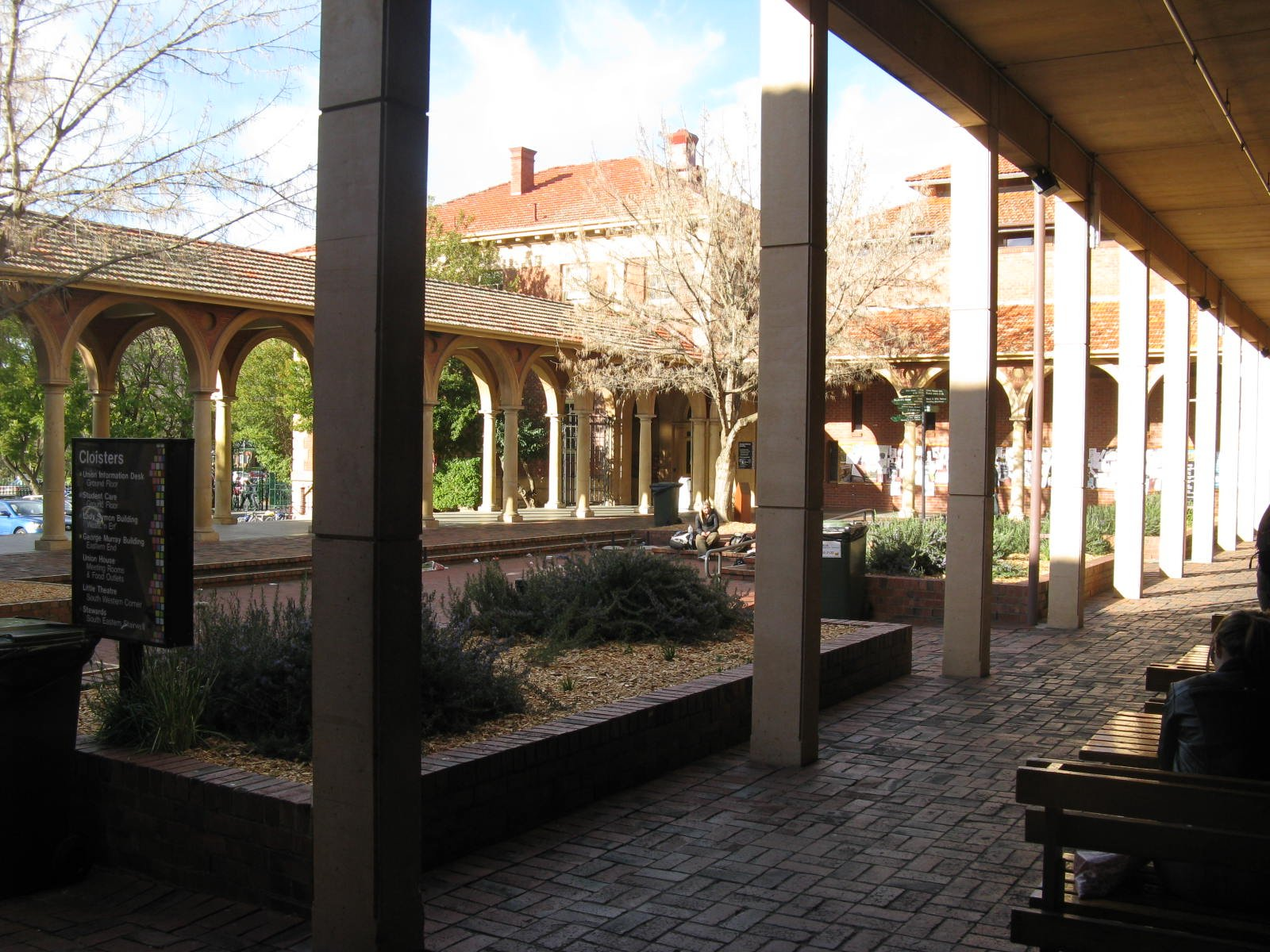
The Cloisters are a war memorial to University of Adelaide members who served and died during World War I.

The Adelaide University Union redevelopment, also known as Union Buildings or Union Building Group, was completed in stages between 1967 and 1975. It created some of the most significant buildings in the complex. The redevelopment was designed by lead architect Robert Dickson and includes a heritage-listed group of buildings including the Union House, the Lady Symon Building named after the wife of Josiah Symon, the George Murray Building, the Cloisters and the Western Annexe. The earlier Georgian-style buildings were designed by the architects Woods, Bagot, Jory and Laybourne-Smith who also designed Bonython Hall, the Mitchell Gates, the Johnson Laboratories, the Barr Smith Library, and the Benham Laboratories. The Adelaide University Union Cloisters were built in 1929 as a war memorial to the 470 University of Adelaide members who served during World War I, of which 64 had died during the war. There are three plaques on the site, with the latest added in 2015 to mark the centenary of the Gallipoli landing.

The university also has a presence in the adjacent Lot Fourteen precinct, that is also home to the national headquarters of the Australian Space Agency among other institutions in the fields of science and technology. It also operates the National Wine Centre further along of the terrace and adjacent to the Adelaide Botanic Garden. On the west end of North Terrace, the Adelaide Health and Medical Sciences Building is surrounded by the South Australian Health and Medical Research Institute and the Royal Adelaide Hospital forming part of the Adelaide BioMed City precinct. The A$246 million biomedical teaching and research facility was completed in 2017 and is home to various clinical and simulation facilities in the fields of healthcare and medicine.

=== Waite ===
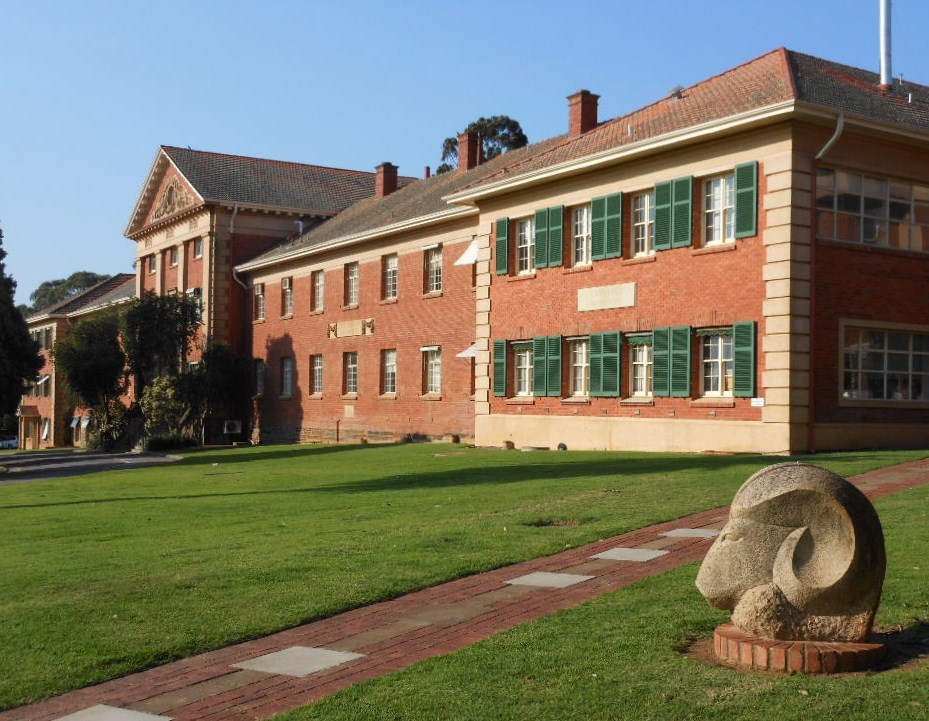
The Waite campus is home to the Waite Research Institute.

The Waite campus specialises in agricultural science, viticulture, oenology, plant breeding, food research and biotechnology. It is located in the suburb of Urrbrae in Adelaide's eastern foothills, adjacent to the Urrbrae Agricultural High School, on 184 hectares (450 acres) of which a large amount was donated through the will of Scottish-born pastoralist Peter Waite. Approximately half of the land donated was dedicated for studies in agriculture and the remainder as a public park. The Waite Research Precinct is home to several research centres.

The Waite Agricultural Research Institute was established in 1924. Its first director was Arnold E. V. Richardson. Later renamed to the Waite Research Institute, it produces approximately 70% of Australia's research output in viticulture and oenology and around 80% of cereal varieties used in southern Australia were created there. A Soil Research Centre was founded in 1929 with a donation of £10,000 from Harold Darling of J. Darling and Son, grain merchants. In 2004, State Premier Mike Rann opened the A$9.2 million Plant Genomics Centre at the campus. In 2010, he opened The Plant Accelerator, a A$30 million research facility which is the largest and most advanced of its kind in the world.

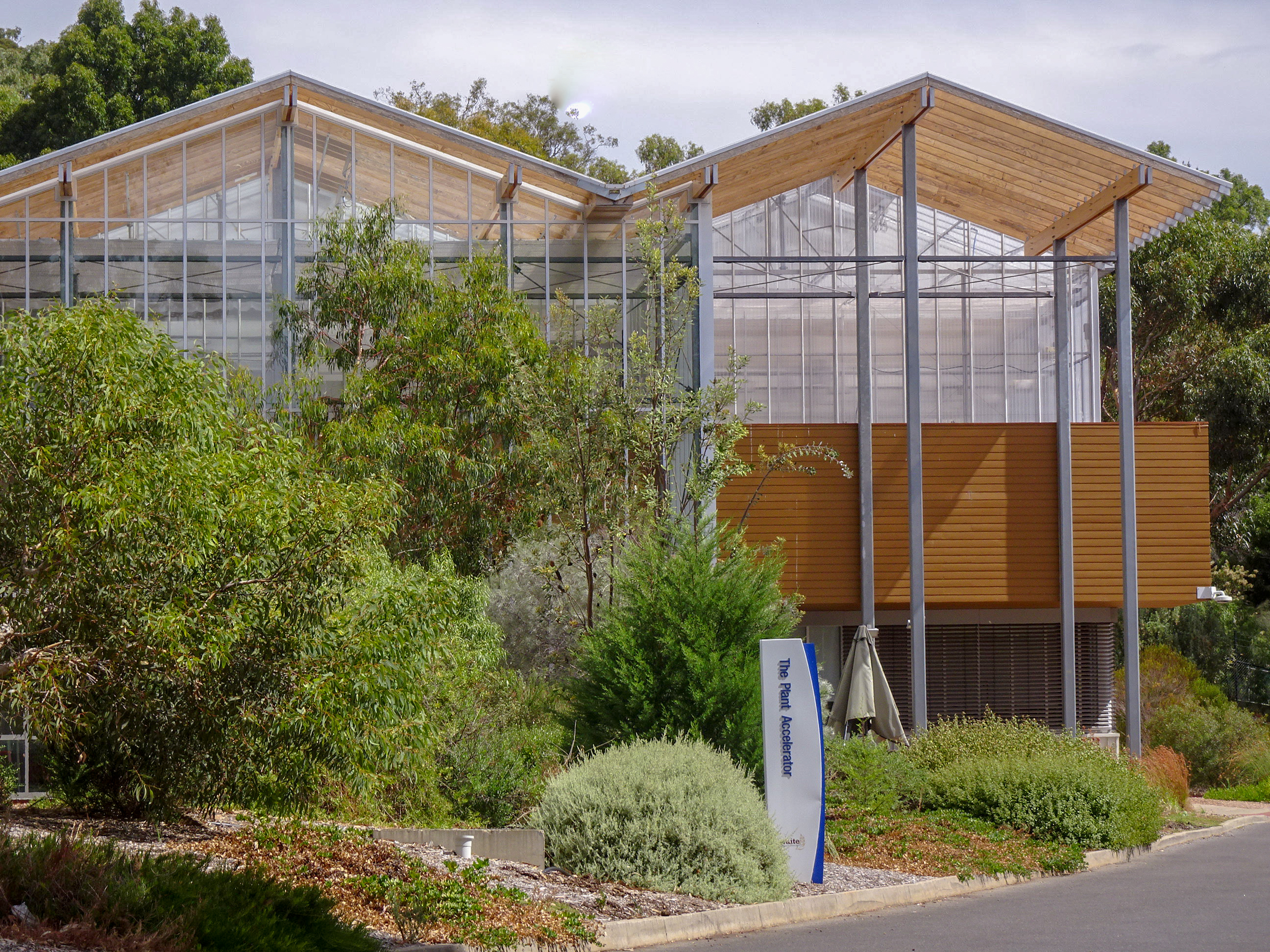
The Plant Accelerator is a plant phenotyping facility.

A number of other organisations are co-located in the precinct including the South Australian Research and Development Institute (or SARDI, part of Primary Industries and Regions SA which is also headquartered at the campus), Australian Grain Technologies, Australian Wine Research Institute and the Commonwealth Scientific and Industrial Research Organisation (CSIRO).

The Urrbrae House built in 1891, now a museum, served as the home of Peter and Matilda Waite who purchased the land with support from Thomas Elder. Its interior & Co is designed by Aldam Heaton & Co, who was also responsible for designing interiors for the Titanic. The campus is also home to the Waite Arboretum and Conservation Reserve. The Waite Arboretum is a tree museum which is home to over 2,500 tree specimens from over 1,000 taxa, many of which are endangered in the wild. The Waite Conservation Reserve, also co-located on the campus, is home to native plants and wildlife.

=== Roseworthy ===
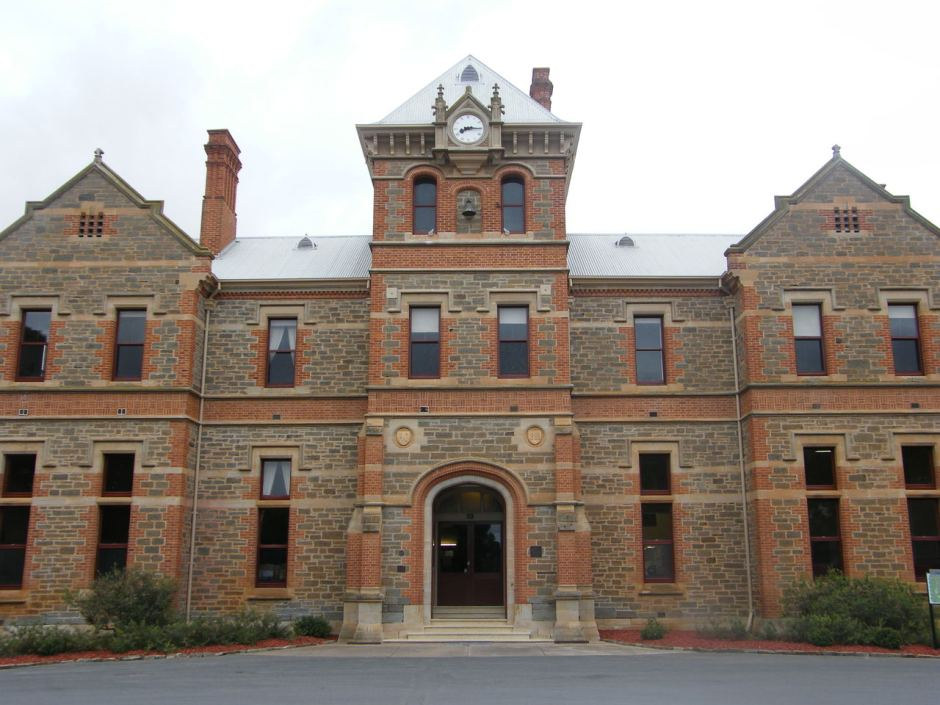
The Roseworthy College Hall, built in 1884, is a student hub.

Located north of the city, the Roseworthy campus comprises 16 km^{2} (6.2 sq mi) of farmland and is a large centre for agricultural research and veterinary sciences. It was the site of the former Roseworthy Agricultural College which was established in 1883 as the first agricultural college in Australia. The Roseworthy College Hall, now the student hub, is the main building on the campus and was built in 1884. Its clock tower features a Swiss precision clock that is synced via GPS with Greenwich Mean Time. The clock tower was missing a clock for more than 120 years until 2003, when the mechanism was finally added following a donation. The colleges' teaching and research in oenology and viticulture were transferred to the Waite campus, along with the bulk of its work in plant breeding. Before studies in oenology were transferred to the Waite campus, the college had produced a number of highly regarded and awarded winemakers and wine critics.

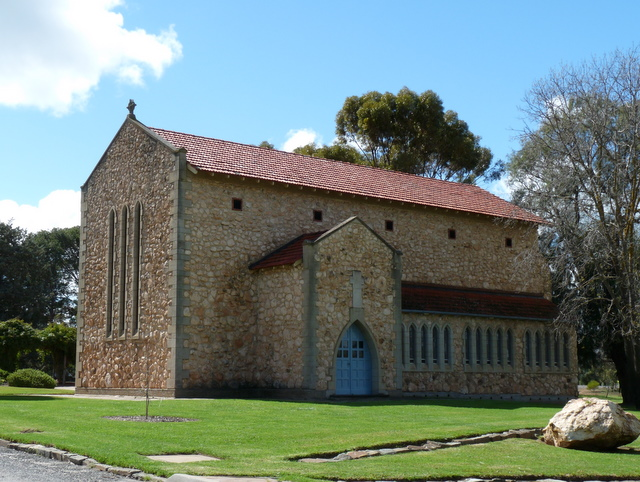
The Roseworthy Memorial Chapel was built to memorialise fallen soldiers from the college.

Following the merger, the campus expanded its focus in dryland agriculture, natural resource management and animal production by the mid-1990s. The campus is also now home to South Australia's first veterinary science training program, which commenced in 2008. The Veterinary Science Centre houses teaching facilities including a surgical skills suite, a public veterinary clinic offering general practice as well as emergency and specialist veterinary services for pet animals. There are also specialised pathology laboratories at the centre for teaching, research and diagnostics. In 2013, the veterinary science facilities were expanded with the opening of the Equine Health and Performance Centre, a specialised facility for equine surgery, internal medicine, sports medicine and reproduction.

The Memorial Chapel is a notable building on the Roseworthy campus. It was built in 1955 to memorialise students from the former college who died during World War I, World War II and the Boer Wars. The entrance features a limestone statue of a young soldier "discarding his uniform in readiness to return to the land". The organ of the chapel was donated by the mother of a student that died in New Guinea during World War II. There is a time capsule from 1976 located near the chapel. It is expected to be opened in 2026.

In 2021, the A$7 million Roseworthy Solar and Energy Storage Project was opened on the campus. It included a solar farm with an output of 1.2MW with a 420/1200kWh hybrid battery. Its 3,200 solar panels are estimated to produce 42% of the campus' energy requirements.

== Governance and structure ==
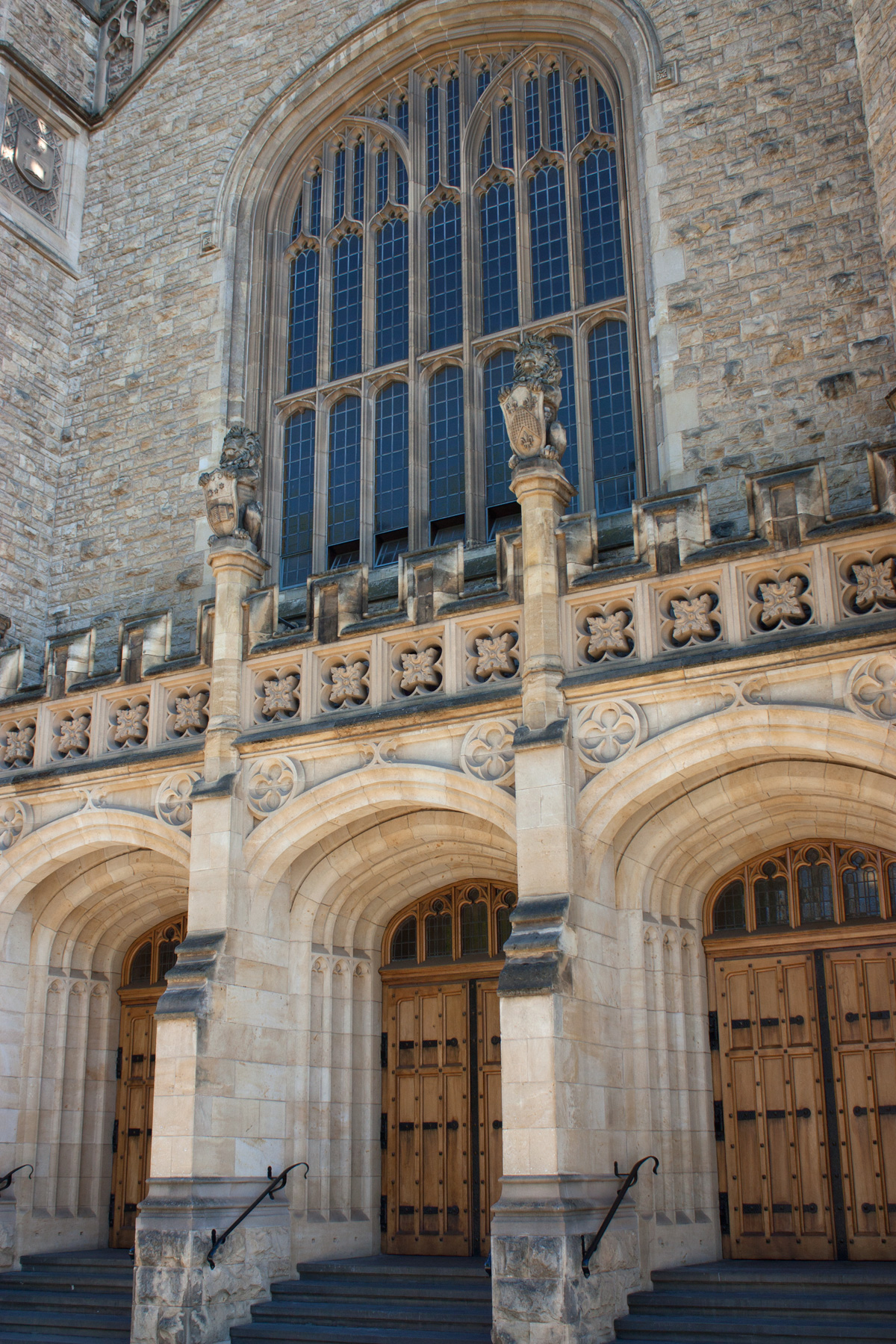
Entrance to Bonython Hall, a great hall of the university, and venue for graduation events

=== Faculties and departments ===
Research and teaching is organised into three faculties, each of which contains a number of constituent schools, departments and institutes. The current faculties at the university were developed over a series of mergers, the latest of which were in 2022 following a merger between the Arts and Professions faculties and the Faculty of Sciences into the Faculty of Engineering, Computer and Mathematical Sciences. The establishment of faculties and academic departments is formally the responsibility of the University Council.

Faculty of Health and Medical Sciences
- Adelaide Dental School
- Adelaide Medical School
- Adelaide Nursing School
- Adelaide Rural Clinical School
- School of Allied Health Science and Practice
- School of Biomedicine
- School of Psychology
- School of Public Health
Faculty of Sciences, Engineering and Technology
- School of Agriculture, Food and Wine
- School of Architecture and Civil Engineering
- School of Biological Sciences
- School of Chemical Engineering
- School of Computer and Mathematical Sciences
- School of Electrical and Mechanical Engineering
- School of Physics, Chemistry and Earth Sciences
- School of Animal and Veterinary Sciences
Faculty of Arts, Business, Law and Economics
- Adelaide Business School
- Adelaide Law School
- Elder Conservatorium of Music
- School of Economics and Public Policy
- School of Education
- School of Humanities
- School of Social Sciences

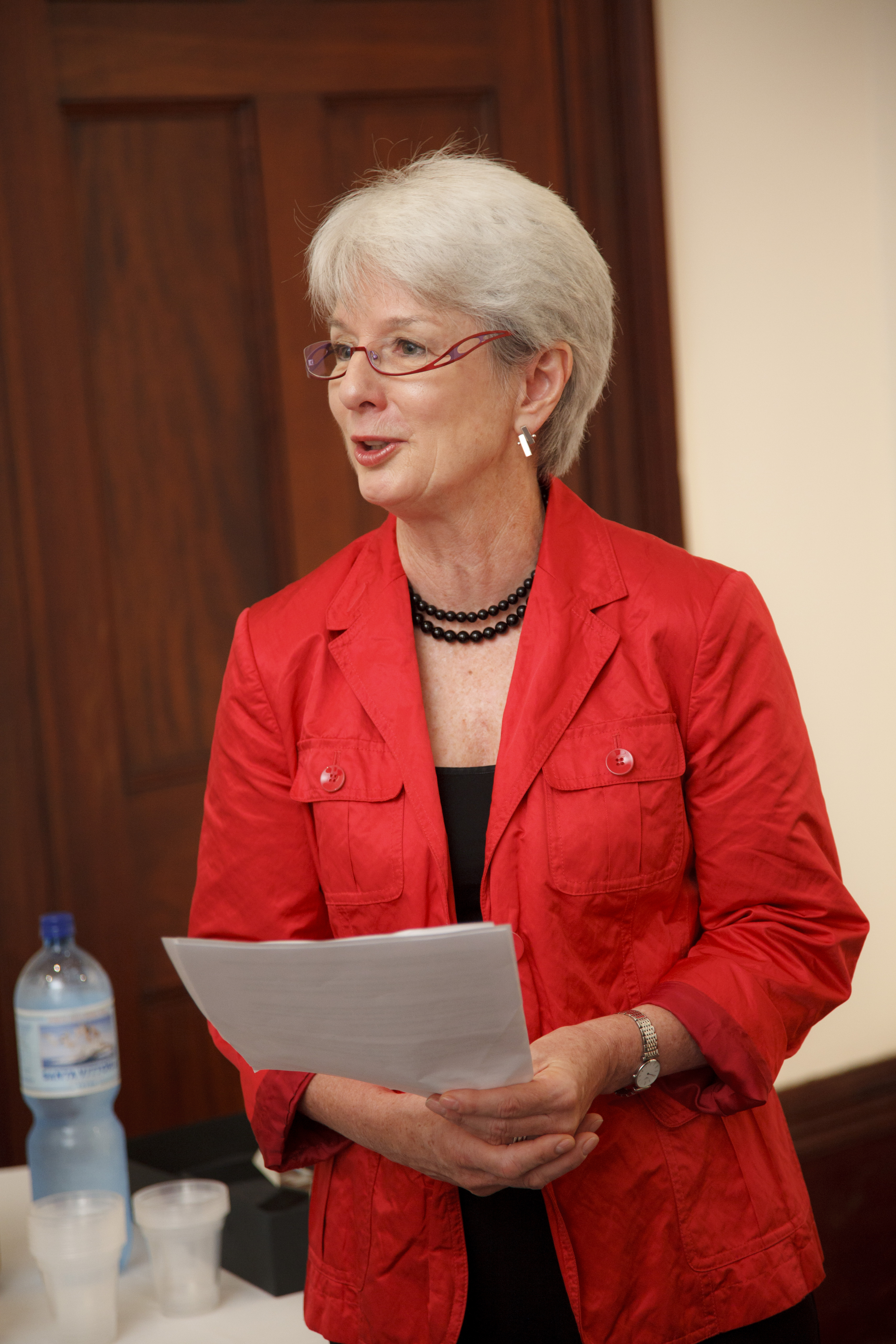
Catherine Branson at a ceremony to present the 2010 Human Rights Medal to Therese Rein prior to her chancellorship

=== University Council ===
The main governing body of the institution is its council. It is the executive committee responsible for managing operations, setting policies and appointing the chancellor and vice-chancellor. The council comprises the chancellor, vice-chancellor, a member of the academic staff, a member of the professional staff, an undergraduate student, a postgraduate student, at least one member with a commercial background, two members with prior experience in financial management and other members appointed by the selection committee. The selection committee, which comprises the chancellor and six other appointed members, can appoint members to the council to serve for between 2 and 4 years. This excludes elected staff and student members, which have a term limit of 2 years.

==== Chancellor and Vice-Chancellor ====
The chancellor of the university was a limitless term position that was mainly ceremonial and was held for the final time by former Federal Court judge Catherine Branson (who succeeded Kevin Scarce following his retirement in May 2020). Branson was appointed by the University Council. The 24th and final vice-chancellor was Danish biochemist Peter Høj, who began his role in February 2021 following similar roles at the University of South Australia and the University of Queensland. While the chancellor's office was ceremonial, the vice-chancellor served as the university's de facto principal administrative officer. The university's internal governance was carried out by the University Council formed through the University of Adelaide Act 1971. The legislation, which superseded the Adelaide University Act 1874, was repealed due to the introduction of the Adelaide University Act 2023.

=== Finances and endowment ===
In 2023, the University of Adelaide had a total revenue of A$1.13 billion (2022 – A$1 billion) and a total expenditure of A$1.09 billion (2022 – A$995.46 million). Key sources of income included A$228.2 million from research grants and fees (2022 – A$190.97 million), A$105.95 million from other research funding (2022 – A$93.22 million), A$350.71 million from tuition fees and grants (2022 – A$318.44 million), A$313.91 million from HESA funding (2022 – A$305.91 million) and A$134.47 million from donations and investments (2022 – A$86.48 million). At year-end the university had endowments of A$393.4 million (2022 – A$366.3 million) and total net assets of A$2.19 billion (2022 – A$2.15 billion).

=== Heraldry and insignia ===
The university uses a number of symbols to represent the institution. The present logo is based on the coat of arms. Other symbols utilised by the university includes a flag, also based on the coat of arms, as well as a ceremonial mace. The university also uses several taglines including its motto and the slogans "seek light" and "make history". The overall branding is expected to be superseded following the merger.

Additionally, Adelaide University Sport has its own crest and motto.

==== Coat of arms ====
While all Australian universities have common seals that are used on parchments, some Australian universities also possess a coat of arms. These were usually grant by the College of Arms in London due to, as opposed to the United Kingdom and Canada, an absence of a national heraldic authority. The coat of arms of the university was grant during the reign of George V in 1925 and has historically since been used on all degree parchments issued by the university. While some universities such as the Universities of Western Australia and Queensland have modified the coat of arms issued on parchments over time, its design has mostly remained the same with the exception of a minor tweak to the crux. The motto in Latin reads Sub Cruce Lumen translated "the light (of learning) under the (Southern) Cross". The official coat of arms, in heraldic terminology, is:

Coat of arms of the University of Adelaide
Granted in 1925 by the College of Arms, London Escutcheon Per pale Or and Argent an Open Book proper edged Gold on a Chief Azure five Mullets, one of eight, two of seven, one of six and one of five points of the second, representing the Constellation of the Southern Cross

As part of the merger, the coat of arms has been de facto retired for new students and will only be available to University of Adelaide alumni and continuing students who started their programs on or before 2024.

==== University mace ====
Many universities possess ceremonial maces used during graduation ceremonies. The University of Adelaide Mace was forged by silversmiths using silver-gilt under the supervision of Frederick Millward Grey. It features the coat of arms on an orb symbolising the world protruding from an open book representing learning with gum leaves-inspired design. Grey was a designer based at the School of Fine Arts in Adelaide which later became an antecedent institution of the University of South Australia. The first mace bearer was KH Boykett in 1926 who carried it during the 50th anniversary jubilee of the first classes at St Peter's Cathedral. The mace symbolises protection of the chancellor and the mace bearer, who is usually a student of the university, carries it in front of the chancellor during ceremonies.

== Academic profile ==
The university is a member of the Group of Eight, a coalition of research-led Australian universities. It is also a member of the Association of Pacific Rim Universities, an international association of research-intensive universities, and the former Academic Consortium 21. It plans to merge with the University of South Australia, forms part of the Adelaide BioMed City research precinct and is a close partner with the Australian Space Agency whose national headquarters is located alongside it on Lot Fourteen. The university also offers a wide range of free online MOOC courses on digital learning platforms edX and FutureLearn, including the MathTrackX bridging program.

The university also offers degree programs in Singapore as part of a joint venture with the Ngee Ann Kongsi foundation.

=== Research and publications ===
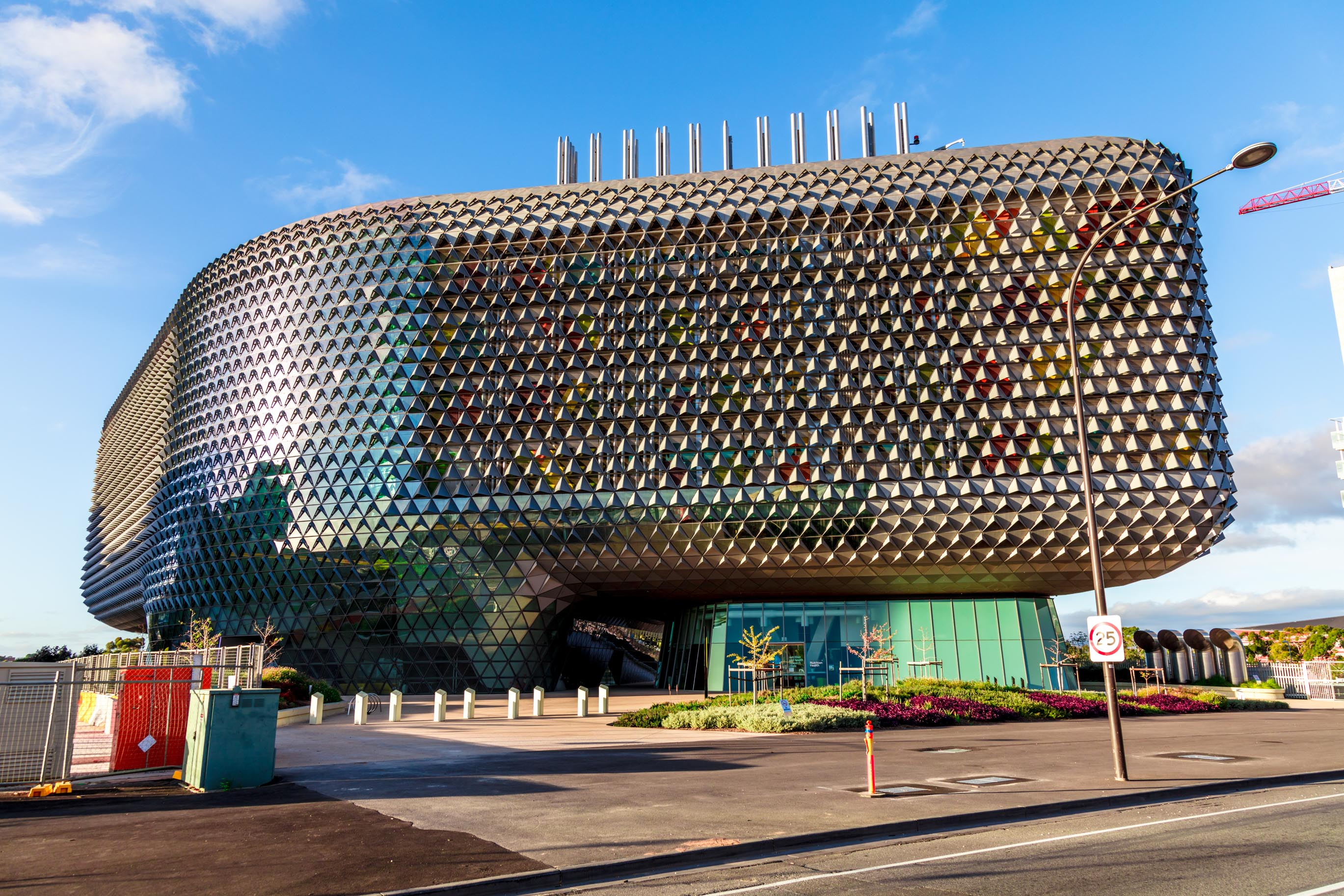
South Australian Health and Medical Research Institute

In 2023, the University of Adelaide had a total research income of A$261.59 million, of which A$121.62 million was from the National Competitive Grants Program; A$65.48 million from other public sector research; A$8.04 million from Cooperative Research Centres; and A$66.44 million from industry and other research. Additionally, it also received A$49.59 million from the Research Support Program and A$53.24 million from the Research Training Program as research block grants.

In the 2018 ERA National Report, the Australian Research Council evaluated work produced between 2014 and 2018. 100 per cent of the university's research activity was judged to be "at or above world standard" (3-5*) with 57 of the 67 fields of research evaluated being "above world standard" (4*) or "well above world standard" (5*). The university had a positive trajectory since 2010.

=== Research institutes ===
The university operates a large number of disciplinary-specific research institutes in partnership with other research institutions and private enterprises. Notable examples include:

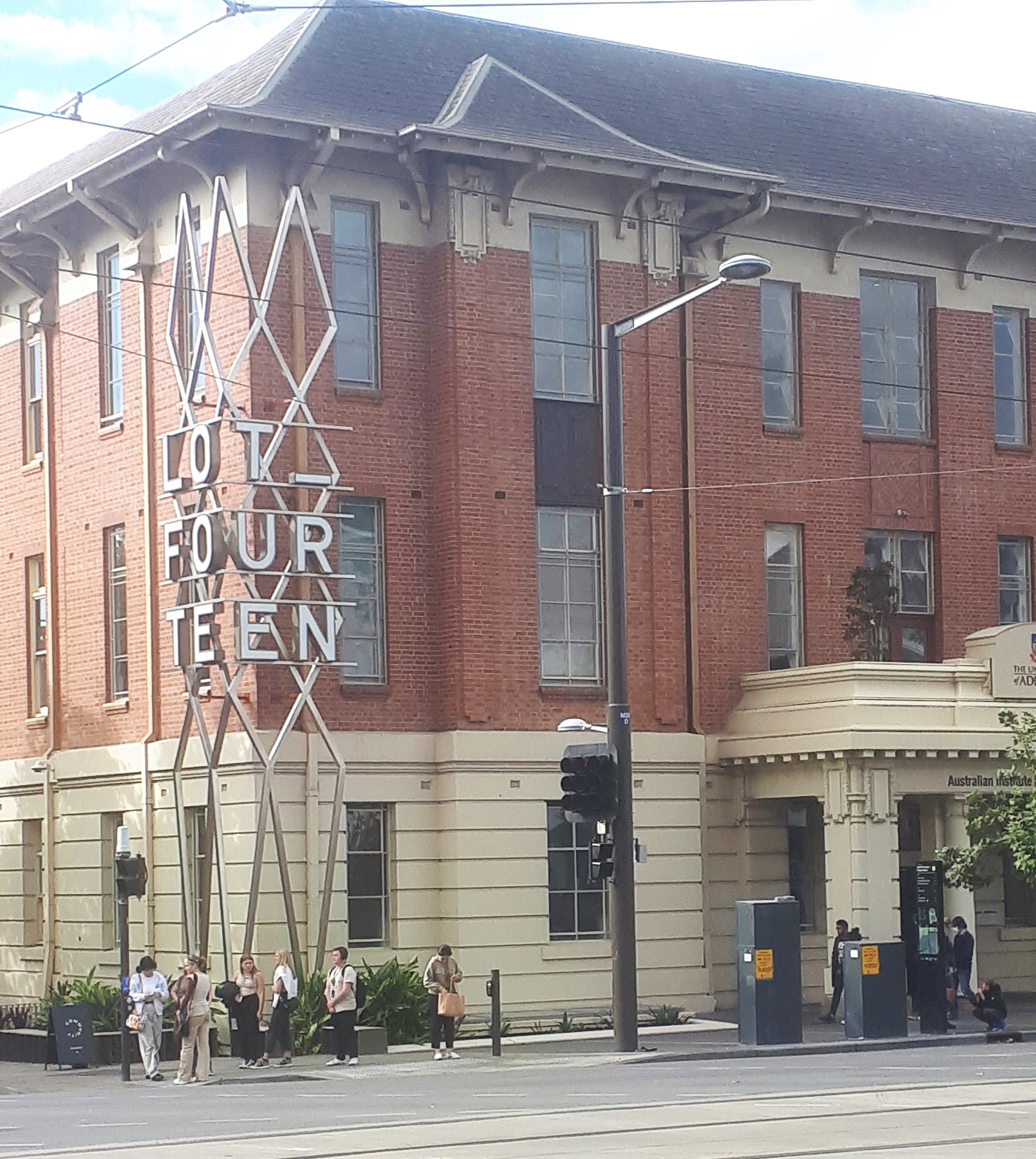
The Australian Institute for Machine Learning next to the Australian Space Agency HQ

==== Australian Institute for Machine Learning ====
The Australian Institute for Machine Learning (AIML) is an artificial intelligence and machine learning research and translation institute based on Lot Fourteen, a business and technology precinct. It is located in a former Royal Adelaide Hospital building in-between the Australian Space Agency headquarters and the University of South Australia's Brookman Building. Established in 2018 with funding from the South Australian government, it is the largest university-based research site dedicated to machine learning in Australia, as well as ranking among the global top sites for its computer vision research capability.

The institute runs on an open access basis; most of its research is open to the rest of the world, either through conferences and journals or via open source software. Its researchers have used machine learning to support industries such as agriculture, medical imaging, defence, space exploration, manufacturing, mining operations and filmmaking. Notable partners have included its foundational partner Lockheed Martin, Rising Sun Pictures and Microsoft.

==== Defence and Security Institute ====
The Defence and Security Institute in Lot Fourteen conducts research in the defence and security sectors including lasers, robotics, autonomous systems, CBRN defence, space exploration, artificial intelligence, cybersecurity and fields of quantum mechanics.

==== Environment Institute ====
The Environment Institute specialises in environmental sciences and research in the areas of climate, biodiversity, ecology and marine sciences.

==== Institute for Photonics and Advanced Sensing ====
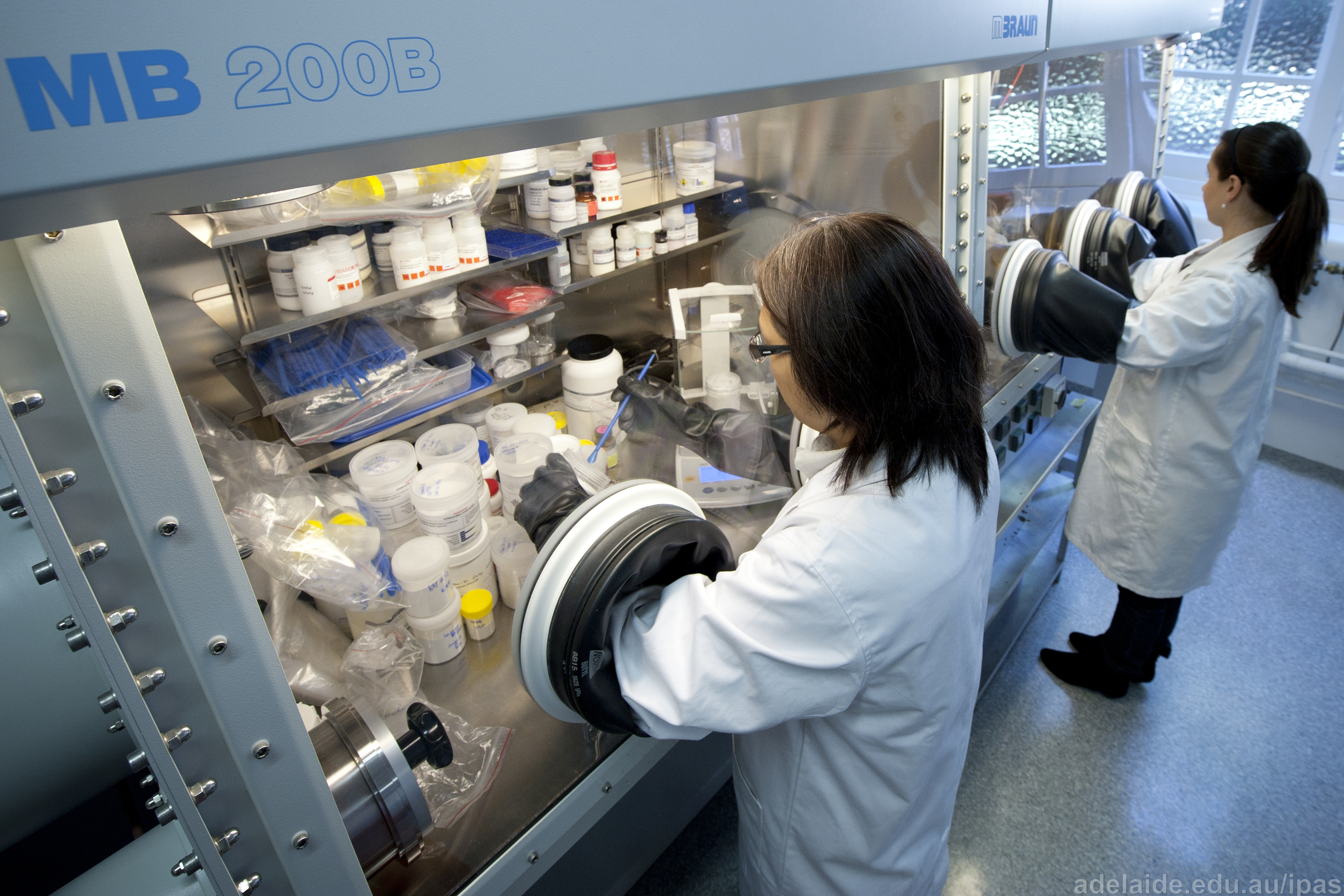
Researchers working at the Institute for Photonics and Advanced Sensing

The Institute for Photonics and Advanced Sensing specialises in photonics, sensing and precision measurement technology. It is based in the Braggs Building, a purpose-built A$95 million headquarters funded with support from the federal and state governments. The institute has 10 research groups and is home to various interdisciplinary scientific and advanced manufacturing facilities. It has developed high-precision measuring instruments used in the agriculture, defence, health, space exploration, tectonics, earth system science, manufacturing, mining and resources sectors.

==== Institute for Sustainability, Energy and Resources ====
The Institute for Sustainability, Energy and Resources conducts research in the sustainability, energy, mining and resources sectors. It has over 20 research centres in fields including mineralology, geosciences, ecology, energy generation, space resources, food production, mineral processing, radiation science, hydrogen production, supply chains, environmental and natural resources.

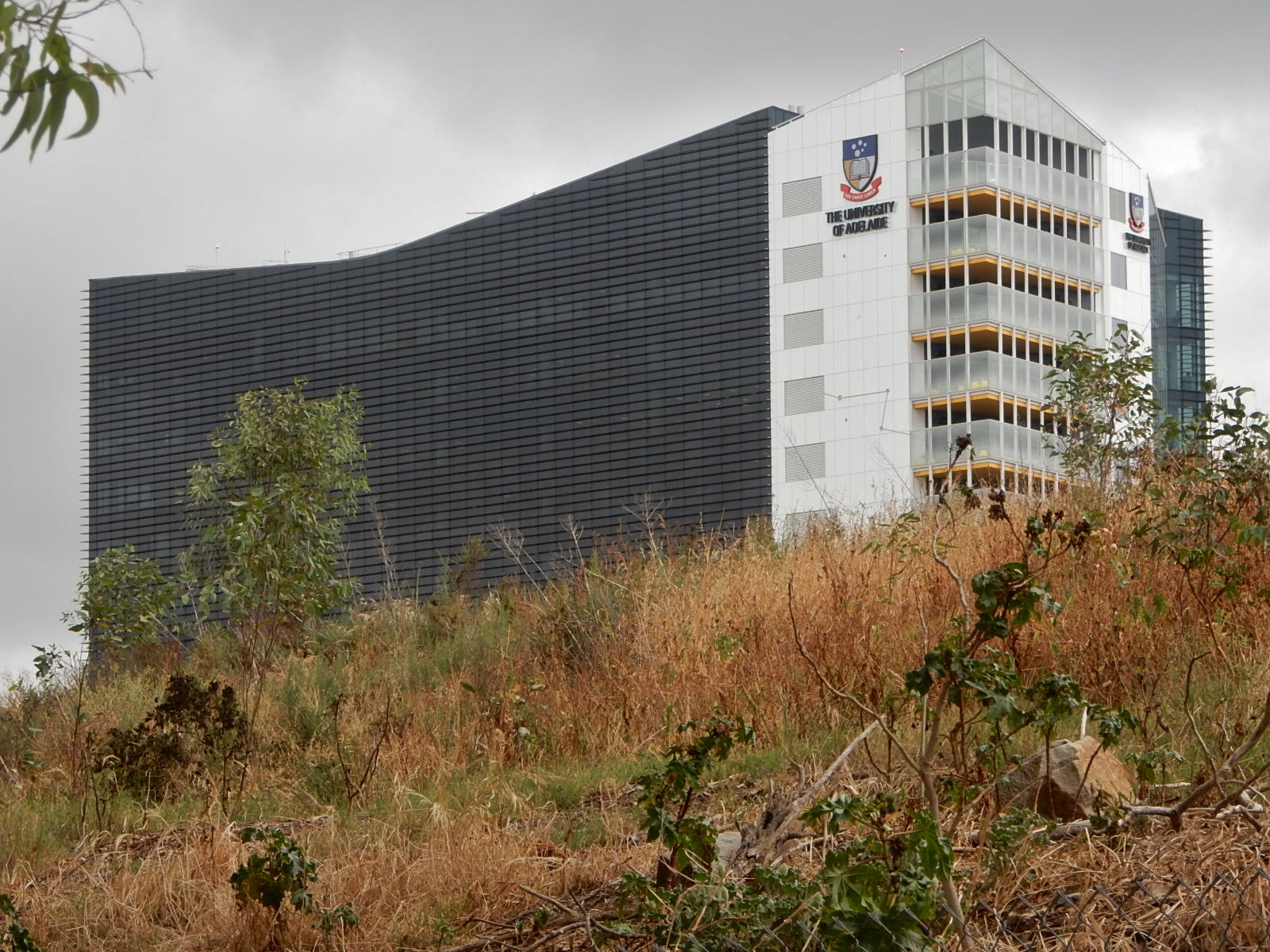
The Adelaide Health and Medical Sciences Building

==== Robinson Research Institute ====
The Robinson Research Institute conducts biomedical research concerning fertility, pregnancy and child health. It has over 45 research groups specialising in fields including biotechnology, congenital disorders, endocrinology, epigenics, genomics, gynaecology, immunology, medical machine learning, medicine, metabolic health, neurology, nutrition, obesity, obstetrics, oncology, ovarian development, placental development, pharmacology, polysomnography, reproductive biology, vaccinology and women's health.

==== South Australian immunoGENomics Cancer Institute ====
The South Australian immunoGENomics Cancer Institute (SAiGENCI) is a planned (as of December 2024 cancer research institute. It was established through A$80 million in funding from the federal government, which was obtained with the support of South Australian Senator Stirling Griff. It is jointly resourced by the federal Department of Health and Aged Care, the Central Adelaide Local Health Network, and the University of Adelaide.

SAiGENCI is located in the Adelaide Health and Medical Sciences Building, in between the University of South Australia's Bradley Building and the South Australian Health and Medical Research Institute, adjacent to the Royal Adelaide Hospital.

==== Stretton Institute ====
The Stretton Institute is named in honour of Hugh Stretton, who was professor and reader at the university from 1954 until he retired in 1989. It was established in 2020 under director Adam Graycar "to conduct research on public policy issues in a multi-disciplinary and multi-method manner and to contribute to policy agendas locally and beyond". No research was undertaken in the first year as it focused on engaging with stakeholders and building recognition. The COVID-19 pandemic delayed some of its plans, such as the inaugural Hugh Stretton Oration. In 2020, through online meetings and webinars with stakeholders, the institute established five initiatives: Agrifood Policy; Building a City for the Future; Climate Change and Energy Transition; Democracy, Security, Trust and Integrity; and Economic Productivity through Population.

The inaugural Hugh Stretton Oration was held in 2021, with Glyn Davis as the speaker, after being postponed from 2020. Since then, speakers included Natasha Stott Despoja, Mark Butler and Danielle Wood.

==== Waite Research Institute ====
The Waite Research Institute specialises and conducts research in agricultural science, viticulture, oenology, plant breeding, food research and biotechnology. It is located on the Waite campus in Adelaide's south-eastern foothills, in the suburb of Urrbrae on 184 hectares (450 acres), a large amount of which was donated through the will of Scottish-born pastoralist Peter Waite. It was established in 1924 as the Waite Agricultural Research Institute. The institute produces approximately 70% of Australia's research output in viticulture and oenology and around 80% of cereal varieties used in southern Australia were created there. A Soil Research Centre was founded in 1929 with a donation of £10,000 from Harold Darling of J. Darling and Son, grain merchants. In 2004, State Premier Mike Rann opened the A$9.2 million Plant Genomics Centre at the campus. In 2010, he opened The Plant Accelerator, a A$30 million research facility which is the largest and most advanced of its kind in the world.

== Academic reputation ==
University rankings

Global – Overall
- ARWU World: 151–200 (2025)
- CWTS World: 205 (Note: The CWTS Leiden Ranking is based on P (top 10%).) (2024)
- QS World: =82 (2025)
- QS Employability: 171–180 (2022)
- THE World: =128 (2025)
- THE Reputation: 151–200 (2025)
- USNWR Global: 99 (25/26)

National – Overall
- ARWU National: 8 (2025)
- CWTS National: 7 (2024)
- ERA National: 8 (2018)
- QS National: 8 (2025)
- THE National: 7 (2025)
- USNWR National: 9 (25/26)
- AFR National: 7 (2025)

In the 2024 Aggregate Ranking of Top Universities, which measures aggregate performance across the QS, THE and ARWU rankings, the university attained a position of #95 (8th nationally).

=== National publications ===
In the Australian Financial Review Best Universities Ranking 2025, the university was ranked #7 amongst Australian universities.

=== Global publications ===
In the 2025 Quacquarelli Symonds World University Rankings (published 2024), the university attained a tied position of #82 (8th nationally).

In the Times Higher Education World University Rankings 2025 (published 2024), the university attained a tied position of #128 (7th nationally).

In the 2025 Academic Ranking of World Universities, the university attained a position of #151–200 (8th nationally).

In the 2025–2026 U.S. News & World Report Best Global Universities, the university attained a position of #99 (9th nationally).

In the CWTS Leiden Ranking 2024, the university attained a position of #205 (7th nationally).

== Libraries and archives ==
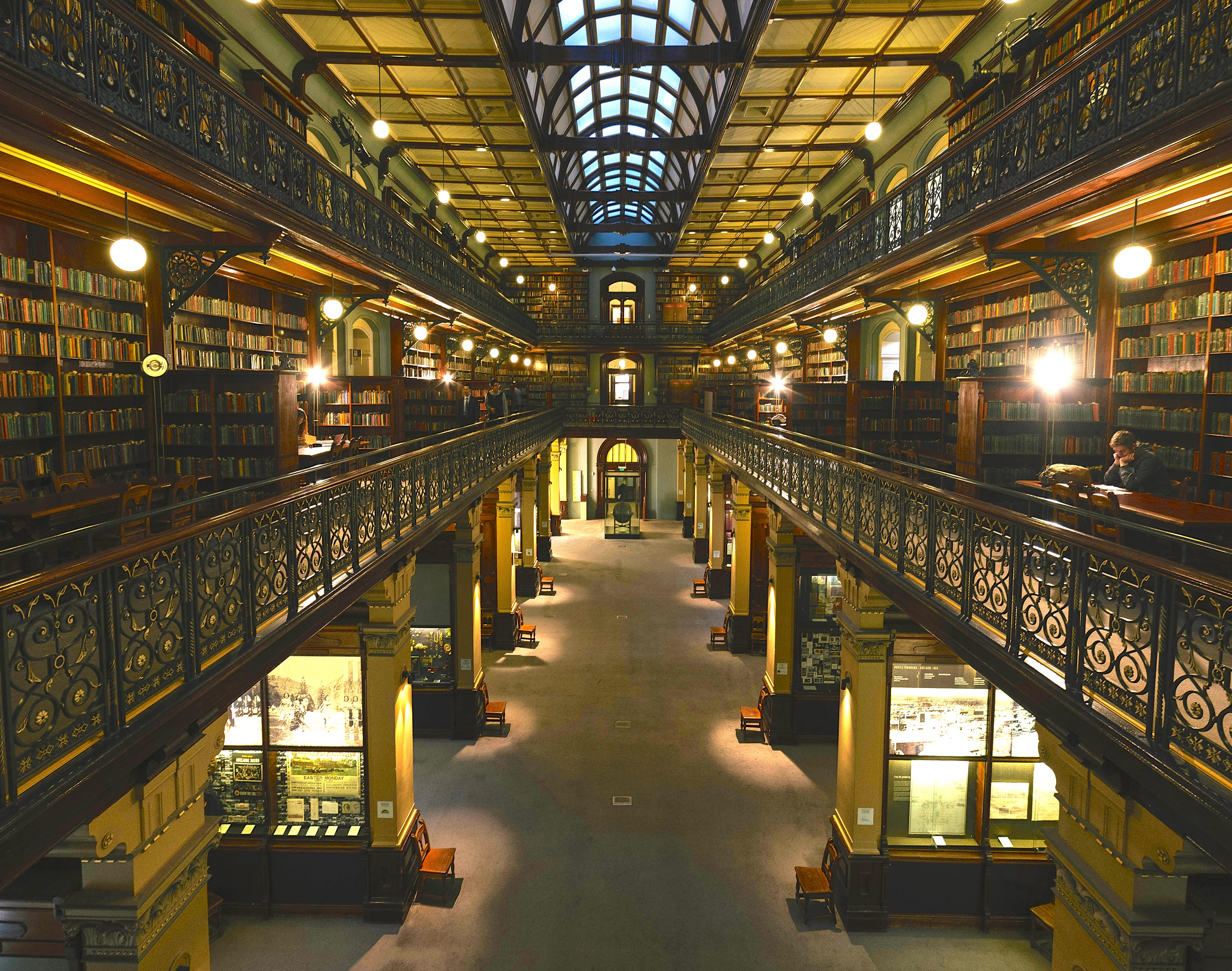
The university is co-located with the State Library where studies were initially conducted.

The library system comprises four libraries located across its three campuses. The largest library is the Barr Smith Library which is located with the Sir John Salmond Law Library on the main campus and the two satellite campuses each have their own libraries. Additionally, the university also has several open access repositories and university members have subscriptions to online academic journals and databases. The State Library of South Australia is also co-located with the university.

=== Barr Smith Library ===
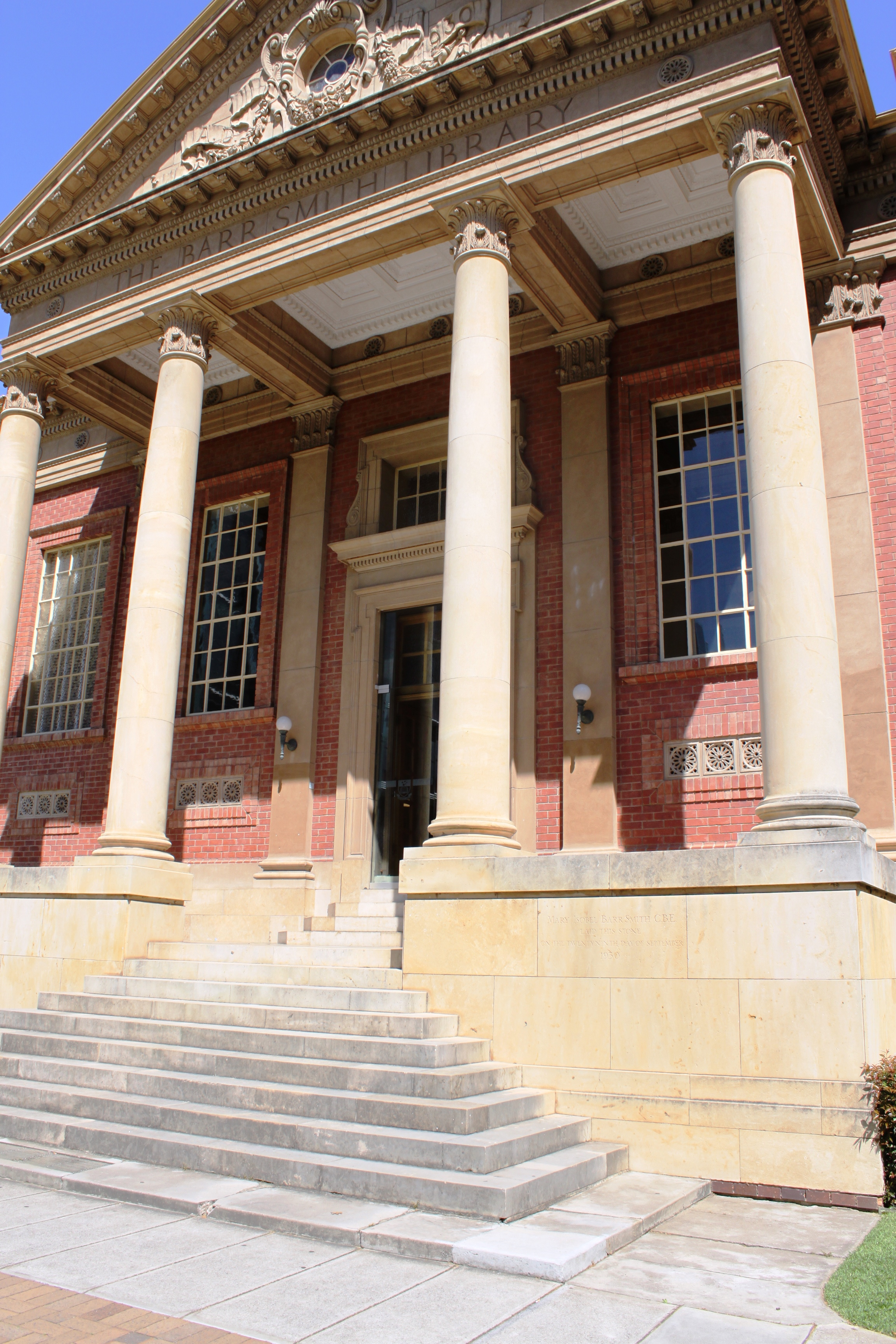
Corinthian pillars incorporated into the Barr Smith Library

The Barr Smith Library is the third-oldest university library in Australia and was originally located in the Mitchell Building. The library purchased its first book in 1877 for £11, prior to its formal establishment in 1882. It was later named after its founder Robert Barr Smith who throughout his life had donated £9,000 to purchase books towards the struggling library, which previously had no librarian and an annual budget of £200 of which £150 were spent on books. William Barlow, the registrar, acted as the de facto first librarian of the then-small library and R. J. M. Clucas was the first official librarian in 1900.

Following Robert's death in 1915, an additional endowment of £11,000 in 1920 was made by his family. In 1928, his son Tony Elder Barr Smith donated almost £35,000 towards a new building for the library to reduce congestion at its original site. Robert's granddaughter Christine Margaret Mcgregor also donated almost 5,000 books in 1974. The building was designed in the Georgian Revival architecture style by Walter Hervey Bagot of the Adelaide-based architecture firm Woods, Bagot & Laybourne Smith and was inspired by Kensington Palace in London. Following its completion, its collection was transferred from the Mitchell Building through a zip line. The building features red-brick exteriors with an entrance with Corinthian pillars below an inscription reading "The Barr Smith Library". It was later expanded twice to increase capacity, reaching a peak of 2 million books in 1999.

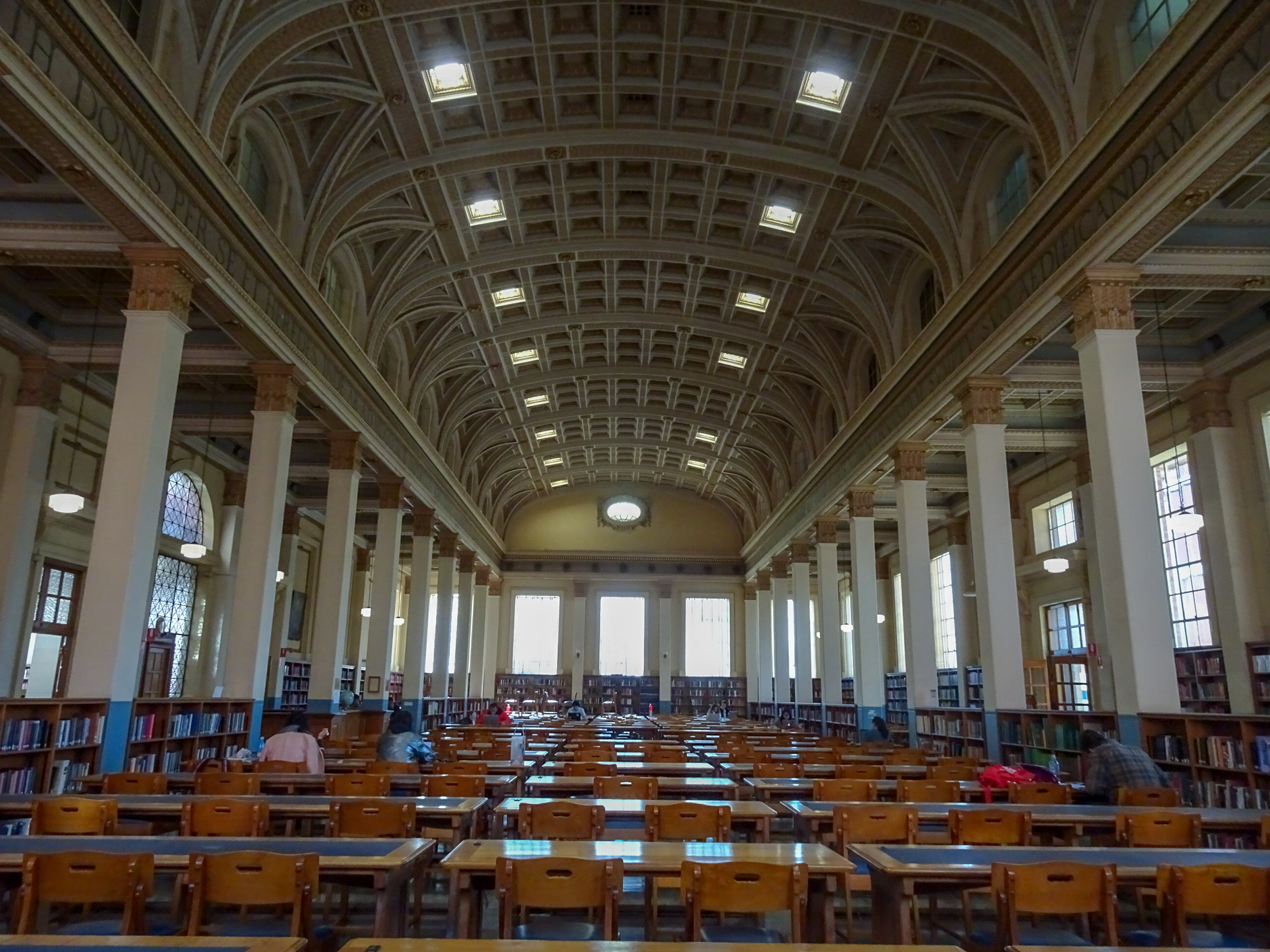
The Reading Room in the library features gilded ivory arches and tall pillars.

The Barr Smith Reading Room is a notable feature of the library on Level 2. It features oak flooring and furniture with white pillars holding the gilded and ivory arches that form the rounded ceiling. Between the pillars and the arches are two large Latin inscriptions that run across both sides of the room in gold and commemorate the donations from Robert and his family who played a major role in its development. In mid-2023, over 61 paper planes were found in ledges around the ceiling of the reading room, including one made using a university brochure dating back to 1991.

The library is also home to a collection of rare books, the archives documenting the development of the university among other collections across various subject areas. This includes books belonging to Samuel Way's collection, who had donated 16,000 books.

=== Sir John Salmond Law Library ===
Established in 1883, the Sir John Salmond Law Library holds a collection of legal works from Australian and overseas sources including the United Kingdom, Canada, New Zealand and the United States. In 1967, the law library moved to the Ligertwood Building, which was among those that replaced the demolished Jubilee Exhibition Building. It was renamed two years later after John William Salmond who was the third Professor of Law at the Adelaide Law School.

=== Roseworthy Library ===
The Roseworthy Campus Library, formerly the Roseworthy Agricultural College Library, is located on the Roseworthy campus.

It dates back to the former Tassie Memorial Library which was funded by John Tassie in 1920. It was built as a memorial to his son, also named John Tassie, who was a student at the then Roseworthy College who died during World War I in France. It was later expanded in 1945 through donations by A Lowrie, the widow of former principal William Lowrie. The William Lowrie Memorial Annexe, which connected to the previous library in a T-shape, was completed in 1947. The library moved to its current site in 1974 due to increasing size constraints with the former site now used as a gymnasium.

=== Waite Woolhouse Library ===
The Waite Campus Library, also known as the Woolhouse Library, is located on the Waite campus in Urrbrae.

== Museums and collections ==
=== Tate Museum ===
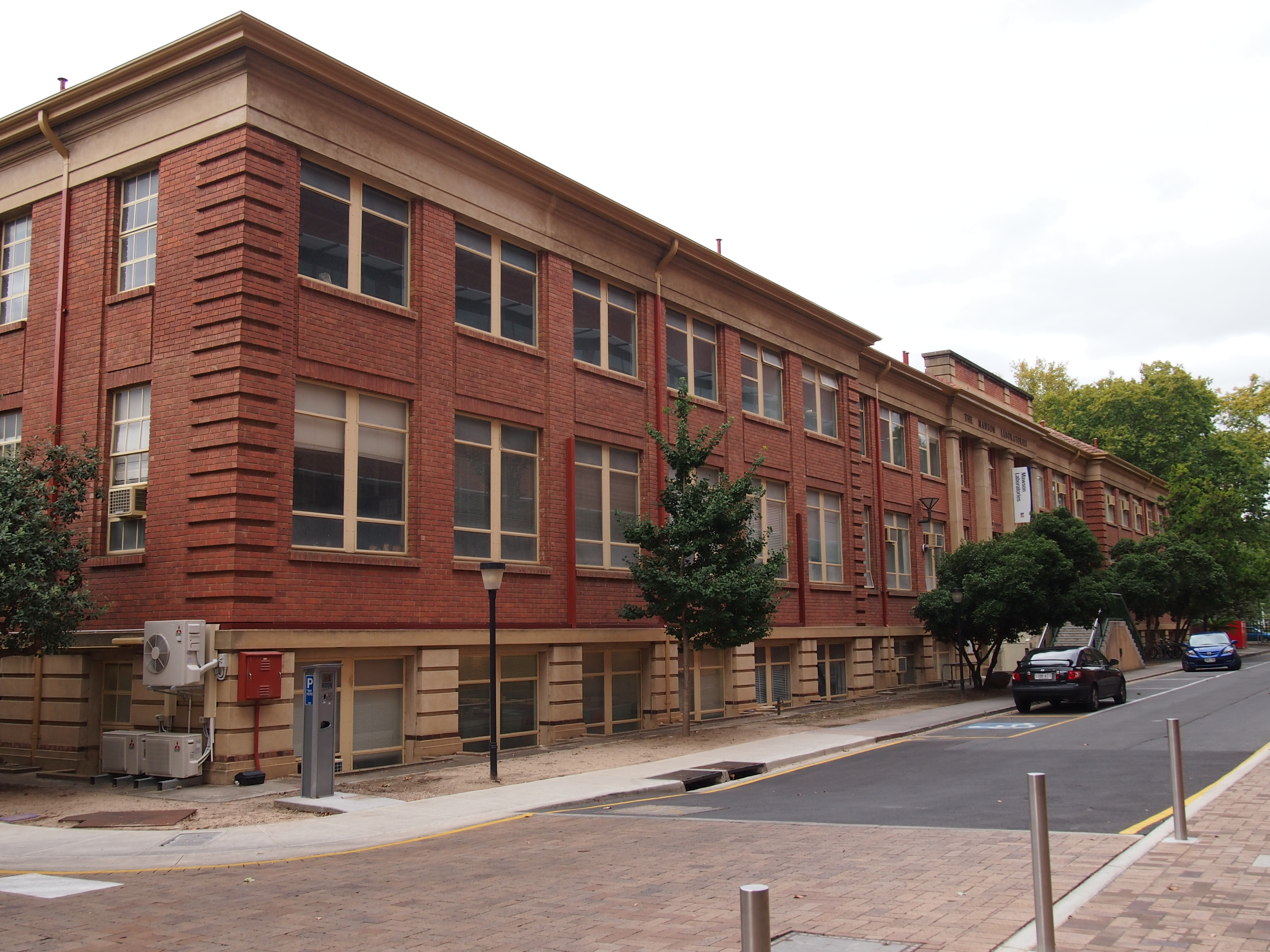
The Tate Museum, located in the Mawson Building

The Tate Museum is a large geological museum housed in the Mawson Building. It was established in 1902 following the death of its namesake botanist and geologist Ralph Tate, foundation Elder Professor of Natural Sciences from 1875 until 1901. The museum had existed informally since 1881, when Tate first began the collection. In 1952, it moved from the former Prince of Wales Building to the Mawson Laboratories (now Mawson Building; named after geologist and explorer Douglas Mawson).

It is one of the largest geological museums in Australia, with a collection of approximately 29,000 rocks and fossils including meteorites, tektites, and specimens of early life. Notable specimens include some of earth's earliest organisms from the Ediacaran, a number of which are from up to 550 million years ago, as well as a display on an asteroid impact that smashed into the state's Gawler Ranges around 580 million years ago, and its associated widespread ejecta layer.

The museum also hosts artefacts from Mawson's various expeditions to the Antarctic, including one of his original sleds, bequeathed to the university by Mawson's widow Paquita Mawson after his death in 1958, and officially named the Douglas Mawson Antarctic Collection. It also houses Mawson Institute for Antarctic Research (founded 1959). The aim of the institute was to foster Antarctic study and research, by the maintenance of a library and collection, and by the delivery of occasional public lectures. George Ligertwood, deputy chancellor of the university, was the inaugural chairman of the management committee.

The museum's first official curator is Tony Milnes, who had worked to restore and document the large collection.

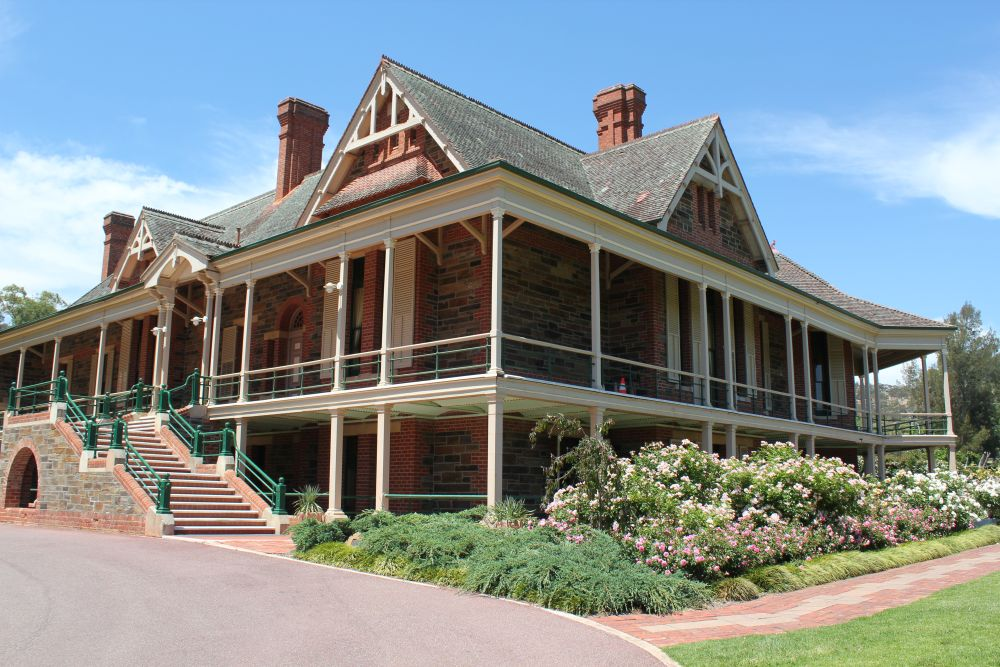
Urrbrae House, built in 1891, now a museum

=== Waite Historic Precinct ===
The Waite Historic Precinct includes the Urrbrae House museum, Waite Arboretum, and Waite Conservation Reserve. The museum resides in the former home of Peter Waite and was built in 1891. Its interior is designed by Aldam Heaton & Co, who was also responsible for designing interiors for the Titanic. The Waite Arboretum, a tree museum, is home to over 2,500 tree specimens from over 1,000 taxa, many of which are endangered in the wild. The annual rainfall at the arboretum is 622mm. The Waite Conservation Reserve is home to native plants and fauna.

== Other divisions ==
Other notable divisions of the university include:

=== Elder Conservatorium ===
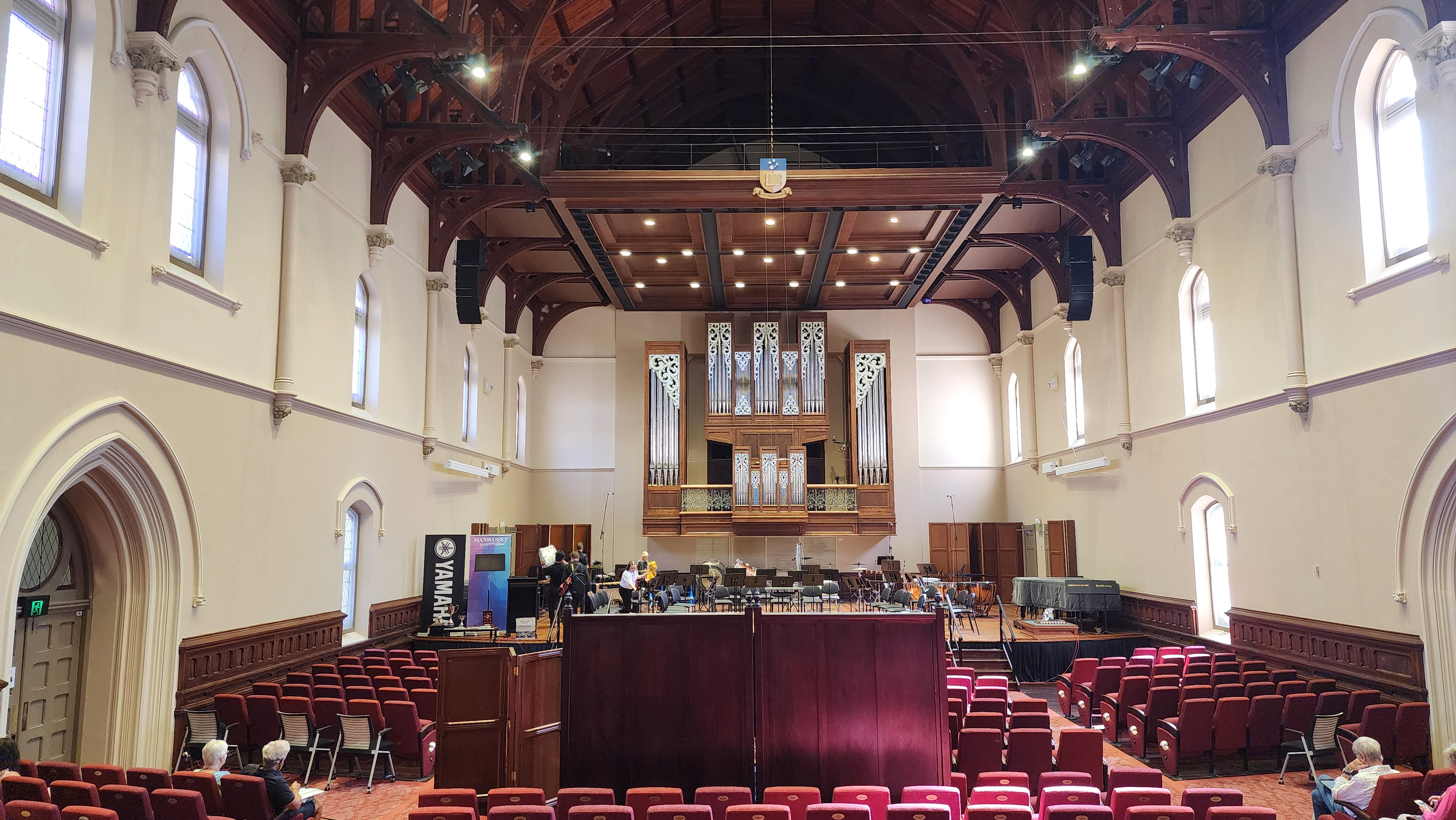
The Elder Hall was inspired by Florentine Gothic architecture.

Established in 1883, the Elder Conservatorium of Music is the oldest tertiary music academy in Australia. It offers study and research programs in jazz, classical performance, musical theatre, classical voice, pop music, sonic arts, music production, song-writing, music composition, conducting, teaching, ensembles and performance studies. It is also home to the Australian String Quartet, Sia Furler Institute and the Centre for Aboriginal Studies in Music. The conservatorium also offers theatre performances and Lunchtime and After Hours concert series. The academy's first Professor of Music was Cambridge graduate Joshua Ives, also the first professor of music in Australia. Edward Harold Davies was the first Australian to graduate with a Doctor of Music in 1902 and Ruby Claudia Davy was the first Australian woman to earn the doctorate.

The Elder Hall used by the conservatorium was built following the death of its namesake and music lover Thomas Elder who left £20,000 towards its construction. The founding stone, made from nearby gumtree, was placed on 26 September 1898 by then-state governor Thomas Fowell Buxton. The building was officially opened exactly two years later on 26 September 1900 in a formal ceremony despite having been already used for months. The South Australian Register reported the next day that the great hall was opened by Lord Tennyson "positively for the last time" and that "the majority of those who were present had already attended at two more or less appropriate ceremonial openings of the Elder Hall". Its current organ is built by Casavant Fréres of Quebec in 1979, having replaced the previous Dodd organ that later was purchased by St Mark's Cathedral in Port Pirie.

The great hall, which was previously used for graduation ceremonies until the construction of Bonython Hall in 1936, was constructed in the Florentine Gothic architectural style integrating freestone from Mount Gambier.

=== National Wine Centre ===
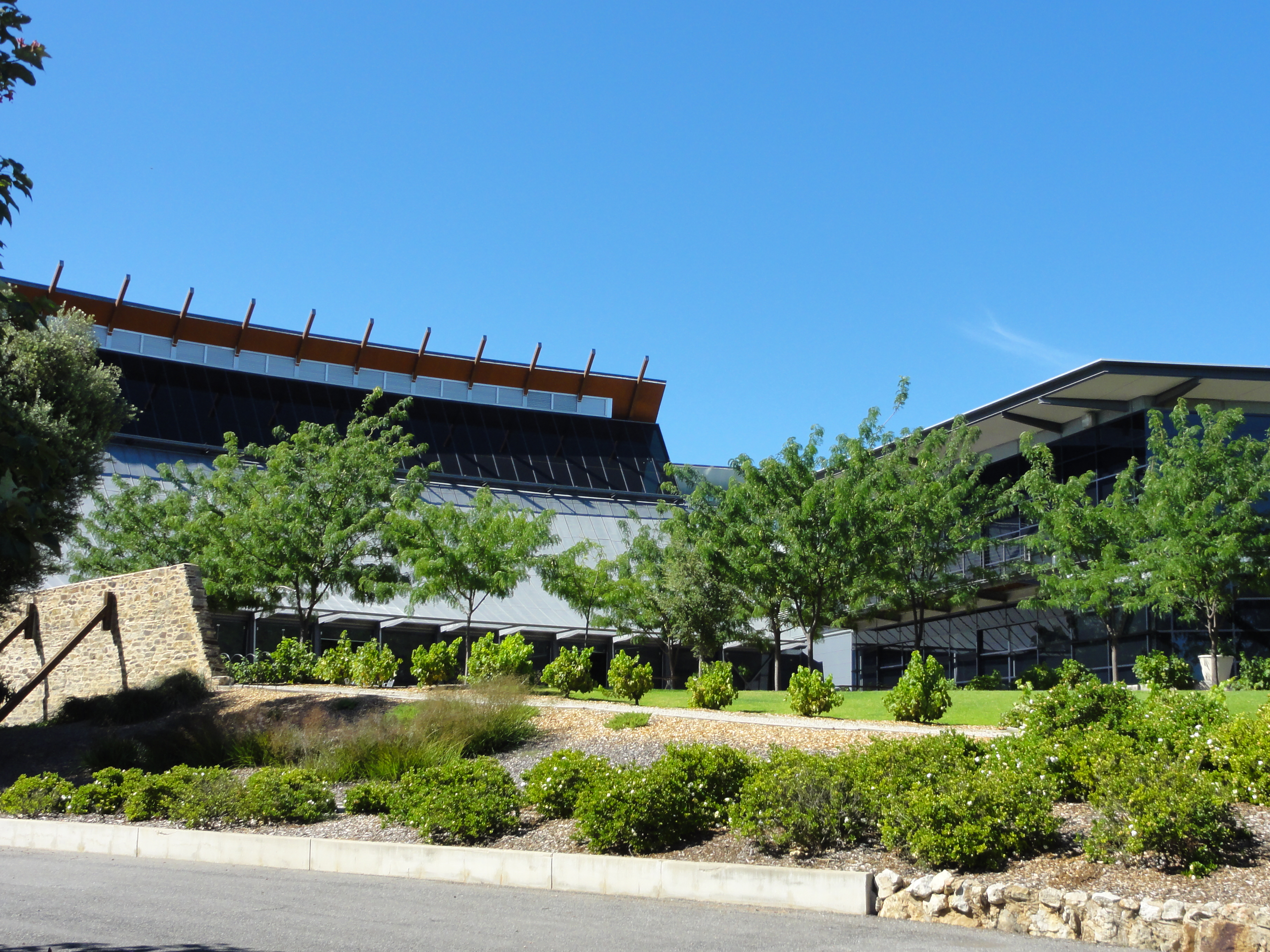
The National Wine Centre of Australia on North Terrace

Located in the Adelaide Park Lands at the eastern end of North Terrace, the National Wine Centre offers some of the university's oenology courses. Opened in 2001, the facility also hosts public exhibitions about winemaking and its industry in South Australia. It contains an interactive permanent exhibition of winemaking, introducing visitors to the technology, varieties and styles of wine. It also has wine tasting areas, giving visitors the opportunity to taste and compare wines from across Australia. The building, which is adjacent to the Adelaide Botanic Gardens, was designed by Phillip Cox and Grieve Gillett and uses building materials to reflect items used in making wine.

== Student life ==
=== Student association ===
YouX SRC Political Groups

Structure
- Political groups: Left Action (5); Grassroots (2); UNITE (4); Progress (12); Activate (1); Independent (2); Vacant (0)*

Website
- youx.org.au/voice/src/

Footnotes
- Accurate as of 23 July 2024

Founded in 1895, the Adelaide University Union, trading as YouX, is one of the oldest students' unions in Australia. The union operates both as the representative voice for university students and as a provider of a wide range of services. It is democratically controlled through its board and Students Representatives Council and is run by elected student officers. The union also supports a range of services, including numerous clubs and societies, social events and an advice service. Union members also receive various discounts including at the UniBar, cafes and shops.

As of 2024, there are over 175 clubs and societies under the umbrella of the union. These include the Adelaide University Sciences Association (the oldest society at the union not related to sports), the Adelaide Medical Students' Society established in 1889 and formerly the Adelaide University Sports Association whose founding clubs predate and ultimately founded the union. The sports association, which was founded in 1896, became directly affiliated with the university in 2010.

In September 2024, YouX and the University of South Australia Student Association announced their intention to merge.

=== Annual Prosh ===
The inaugural Prosh Parade following its 1905 formalisation

The student union also organises the annual Prosh week events inspired by the medieval tradition of ragging or "an extensive display of noisy disorderly conduct, carried on in defiance of authority or discipline". The annual Procesh procession began in 1905 as a means for students to poke fun at established South Australian institutions, though ragging at the university dates back to the late 19th century. In one example, multiple alarm clocks set and hid by students behind books made constant interruptions during a 1896 ceremony at the former Mitchell Building library. The Prosh parade has in modern times included live band performances on flatbed trucks, student club-made floats and booze cruisers transporting inebriated students. Among notable pranks, students suspended a Holden car on Adelaide University Footbridge in 1971 above the River Torrens as part of Operation Bridge-hang.

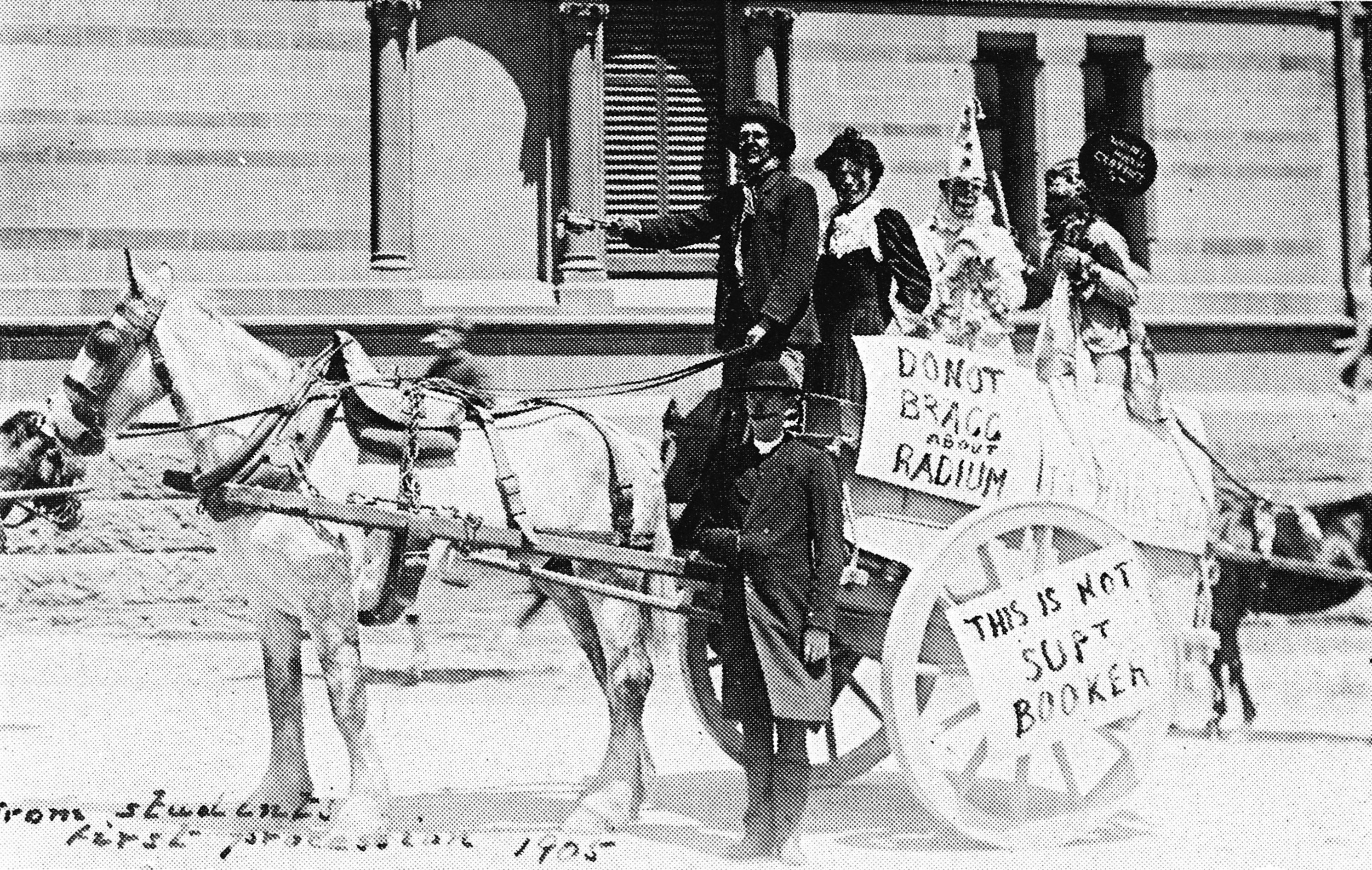
Students on horse cart during the 1905 Prosh Parade with a poster that reads "DO NOT BRAGG ABOUT RADIUM"

Since 1954, the event has also involved the sale of satirical newspapers in public settings. The Prosh Rag, later an annual issue of the On Dit student magazine, contains humorous references to various well-known persons of the day. It has been sold on city streets by students to raise funds for charity as an attempt to legitimise the event following attempts to ban it in the early 1950s. Since at least the 1960s, the event and magazine has often been involved in controversial topics including Australia's involvement in the Vietnam War, apartheid, nuclear warfare, Aboriginal rights and the general administration of the university. Following the end of free university education, the event has toned down in more recent times as a result of increased work commitments by students and the rise of social media for activism. Prosh week winds up with the Prosh After Dark social event in the UniBar which has its origins from the Prosh Ball.

=== Student newspapers and radio ===
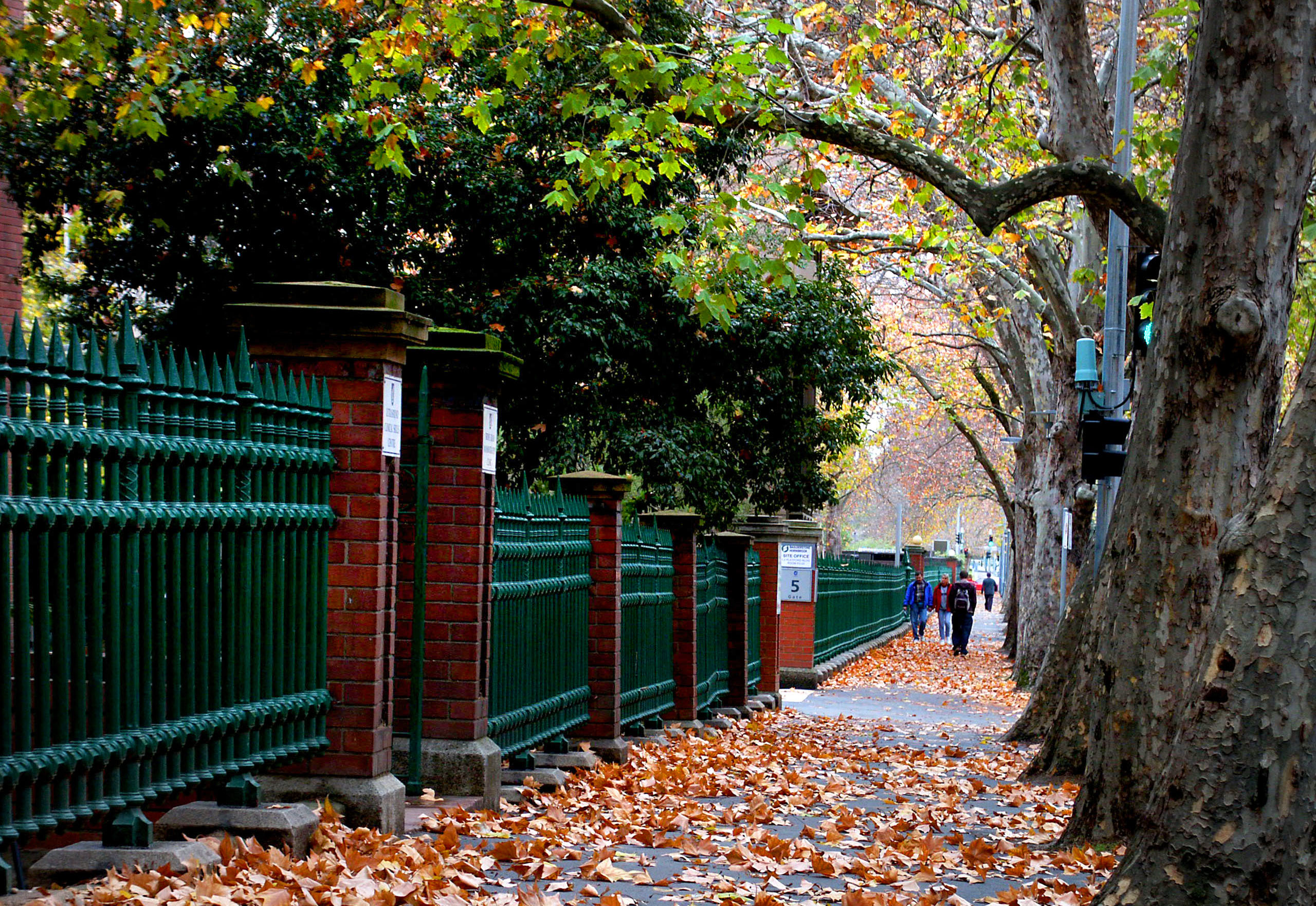
A footpath along the southern fence on War Memorial Drive

On Dit (pronounced on-dee), the second-oldest student-run print media in Australia, was established by the student union in 1932. It is named after the French expression "we say" and operates independently of the university. It also occasionally uses the name "Hearsay" as a creative writing edition of the magazine that dates back to 1972 when the then-newspaper changed its name to "Heresay" in Volume 14 as part of a protest against nuclear testing in the Pacific by France. The Prosh Rag, which contains satirical content, is another special issue that is sold by students to the public to raise funds for charities. On Dit often publishes content on national and global politics and is an example of student activism at the university. Former writers of the newspaper include politicians Julia Gillard, Christopher Pyne, Penny Wong, Nick Xenophon and John Bannon.

It is the successor to the Varsity Ragge which was founded in 1929. It also published news, poetry and comedic works from various student clubs and societies, including the neighbouring Adelaide Teachers College which later became part of the university campus. According to On Dit, the original newspaper failed due to student apathy. The oldest student-run newspaper dates back to 1889 as the Review, which was previously ran by the Adelaide Medical Students' Society.

The Adelaide University Magazine was another student-run magazine that began printing in 1918. Following the establishment of On Dit as the official organ of the student union, it renamed to the Phoenix in 1935 as a modernist cultural and artistic magazine with literary works including poetry. Following funding cuts in 1940, its editors founded the Angry Penguins which was influential in the then-isolationist Australia as a socially-progressive magazine promoting internationalism. The magazine ceased operations after six years, following the Ern Malley hoax that set back modernism in the country. The magazine was later revived on-and-off the following years as the Phoenix but published its final issue in 1949. Later attempts by the student union in the 1950s to revive the Adelaide University Magazine as a staff and graduate magazine, rather than one focussed on artistic and literary works, failed.

The University of Adelaide also runs its own official university-run newspapers including Lumen and formerly The Adelaidean between 1991 and 2016. Other historical student newspapers include The Torch and Flambeau, also associated with the affiliated Adelaide Teachers College which later merged with the university.

The university founded Radio Adelaide, Australia's first community radio channel, in 1972 and operated it until 2016. Adelaide University Student Radio was established in 1975 and was the oldest student-run radio program in Australia.

=== Sports and athletics ===
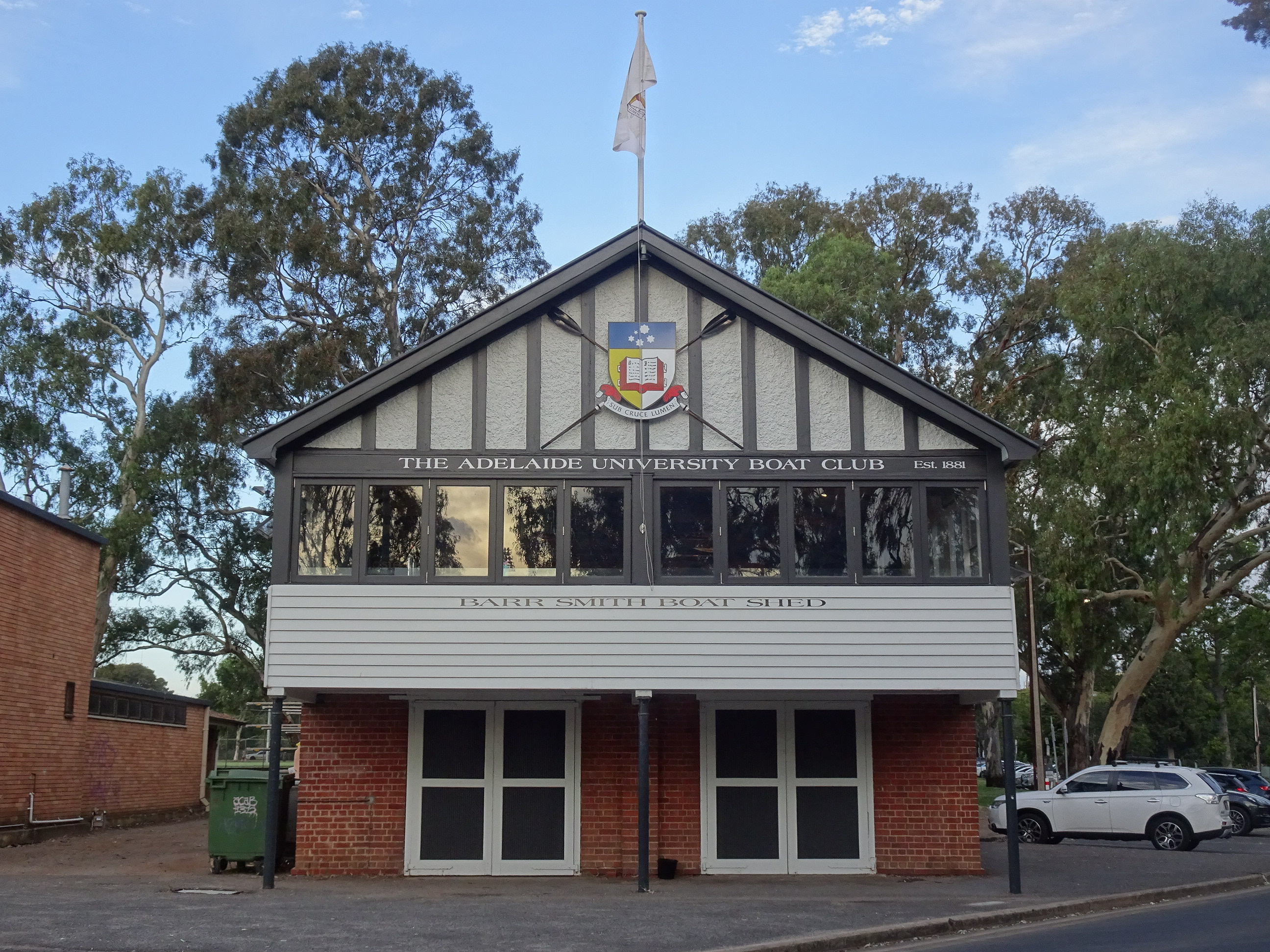
The boat shed of the Adelaide University Boat Club was donated by Robert Barr Smith.

Established in 1896, Adelaide University Sport has 37 sports clubs, including some that predate its establishment. Its historical motto is Mobilitate Vigemus translated "we thrive by mobility". Its sporting colours black and white are likely from the white-backed magpie, an Australian bird found on its crest and the state badge. Its mascot is Gus, a black lion, which replaced the piping shrike on its historical crest.

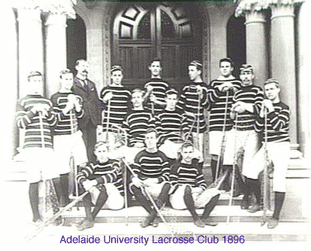
The Adelaide University Lacrosse Club "A" team in black and white sporting colours

The Adelaide University Boat Club was founded in 1881 and operates from the River Torrens in the Adelaide city centre and from West Lakes. Its primary boat shed was donated by Robert Barr Smith in 1909. The club claims to be the second-oldest in Australia, though this claim is disputed with the Sydney University Boat Club who uses the founding date of the Sydney Rowing Club. Each year the club competes in a number of events including the Oxford and Cambridge Cup, which was donated by Old Blues of the Universities of Oxford and Cambridge in the 1890s. Several Olympians have previously been members of the club including Collier Cudmore who later became Australia's first gold medalist in rowing at the 1908 London Olympics. The Adelaide University Tennis Club was founded in 1885 and is a lawn tennis club. The Adelaide University Lacrosse Club was founded in 1889 by future Nobel laureate William Henry Bragg and is one of the oldest in Australia. It is long-time rivals with the Melbourne University Lacrosse Club.

Following the 1895 establishment of the Adelaide University Union, the student association, the three clubs co-founded the Adelaide University Sports Association in 1896. Additional sports clubs such as the Adelaide University Football Club were established throughout the 20th century. The sports association was administered by the student union for over 100 years before becoming directly affiliated with the university in 2010. The Adelaide University Sports Association renamed to Adelaide University Sport that same year.

=== Residential colleges ===
The university did not set any land aside on its main campus for student accommodation due to ideological opposition to the culture of live-in students at the time but also influenced by the small size of the original campus. However, demand for residential college accommodation led to the establishment of private colleges affiliated to the university.

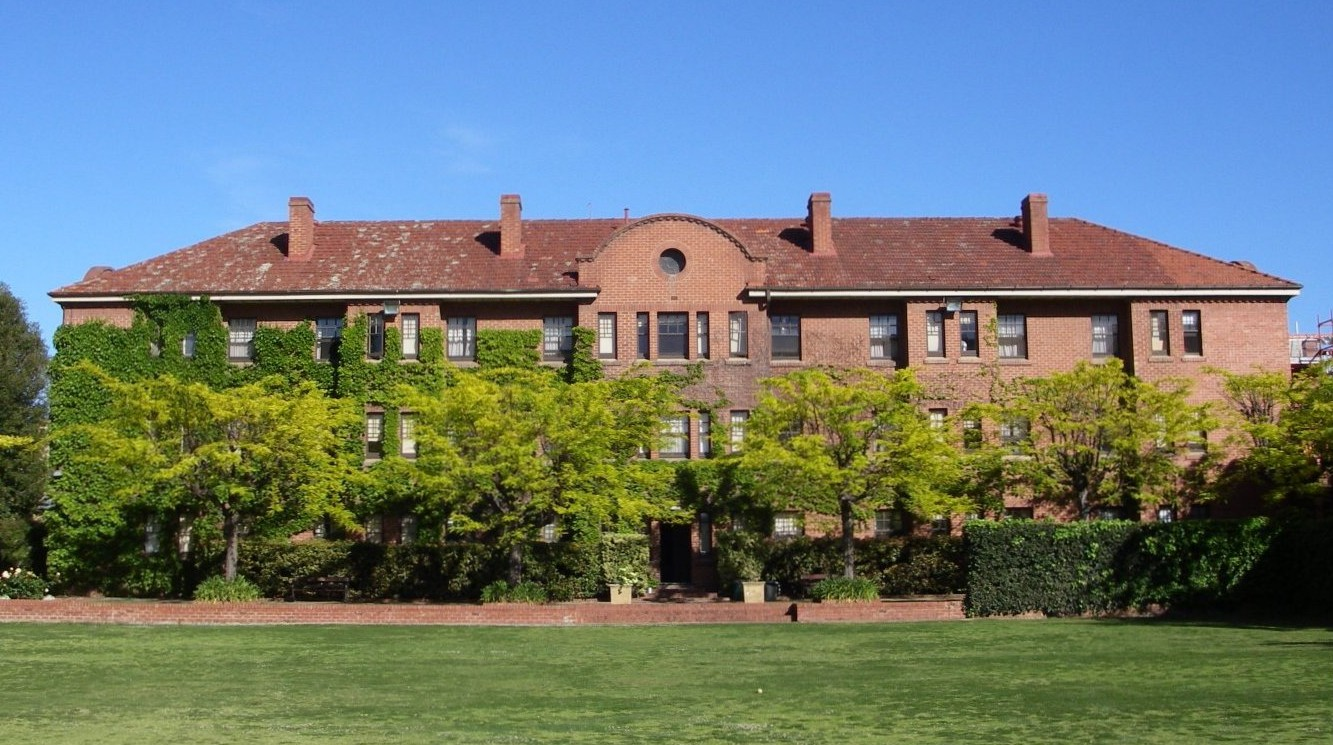
Newland Building of St Mark's College, one of several private residential colleges

St Mark's College was founded in 1925 by the Anglican Diocese of Adelaide and is the oldest of the colleges. It was developed by some former residents of the Universities of Oxford and Cambridge among others with the goal of developing a similar collegiate lifestyle.

Aquinas College was founded as a men's college in 1950 by the Catholic Church at Montefiore House, the former residence of Samuel Way who was a chancellor and vice-chancellor at the university. It later expanded to surrounding sites and became co-residential in 1975.

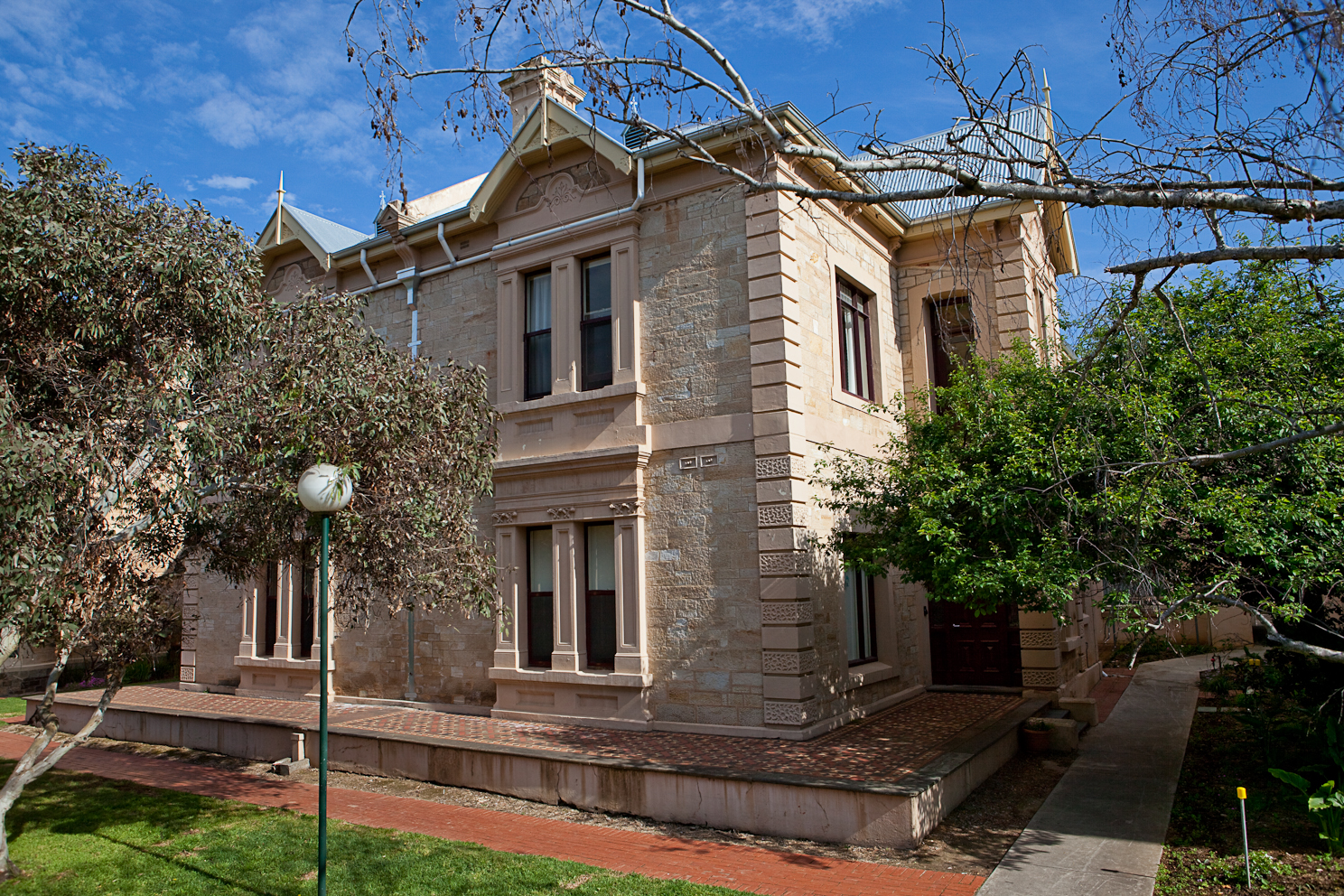
Abraham House, one of several heritage buildings that are part of Lincoln College

St Ann's College was founded as a women's college in 1947. The college's honorary founder is politician Josiah Symon who in 1924 suggested that female students at the university should have somewhere to live. It became co-educational in 1973.

Lincoln College was founded in 1952 by the Methodist Church and named after the Lincoln College at the University of Oxford. Originally established as a men's college, it became co-residential in 1973. It features several heritage-listed buildings.

There are also other private student accommodation providers in the city centre and in suburban Adelaide. The university also manages the University Village, Mattanya Student Residences and the Roseworthy Residential College.

==== Former colleges ====
Kathleen Lumley College was a postgraduate college founded by the university in 1965. It closed in 2022 following a drop in overseas students during the COVID-19 pandemic.

== Notable people ==
The University of Adelaide's alumni also includes students from past mergers including the Roseworthy Agricultural College and the City campus of the former South Australian College of Advanced Education (including its predecessors the Adelaide Teachers College and the Adelaide College of Advanced Education).

Notable alumni of the university include:

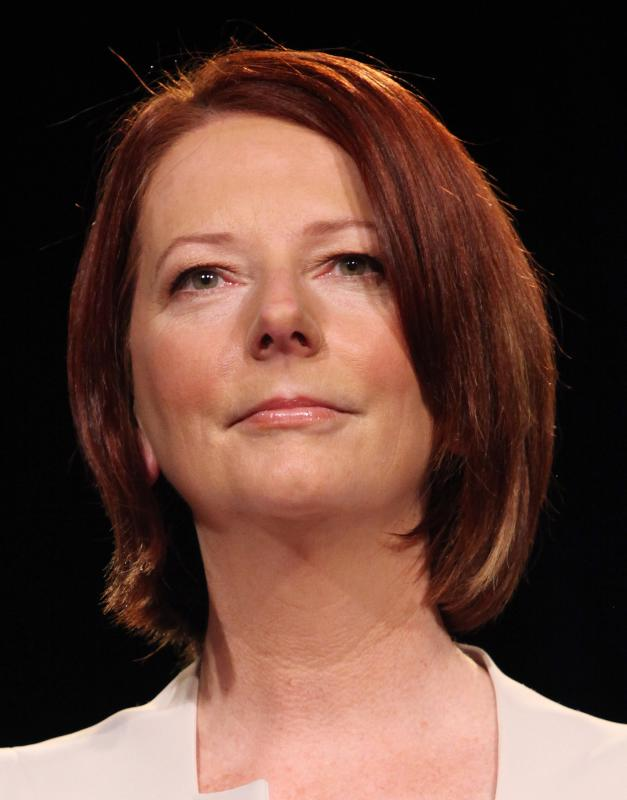
Julia Gillard
First female prime minister of Australia

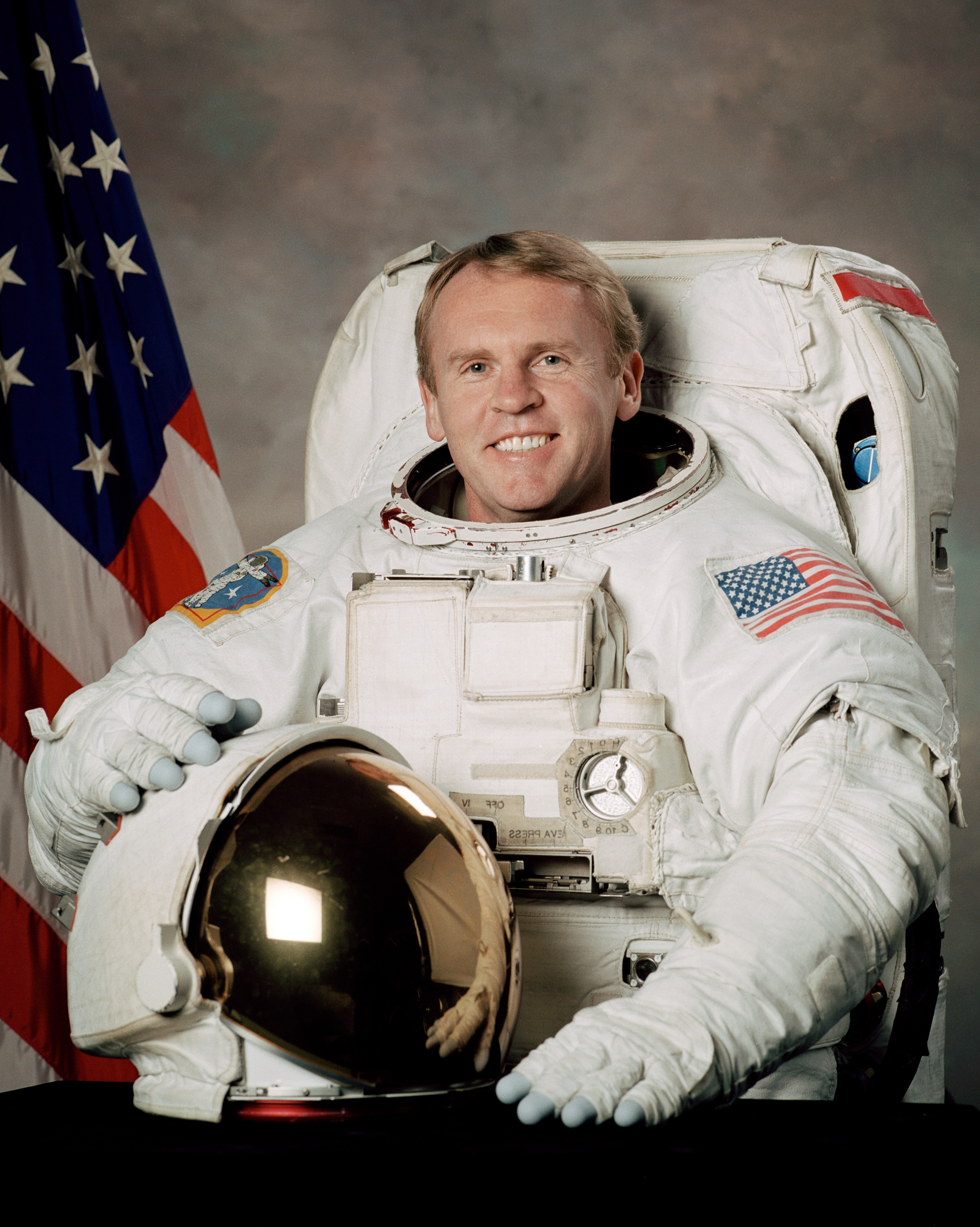
Andy Thomas
Aerospace engineer and first Australian-born astronaut

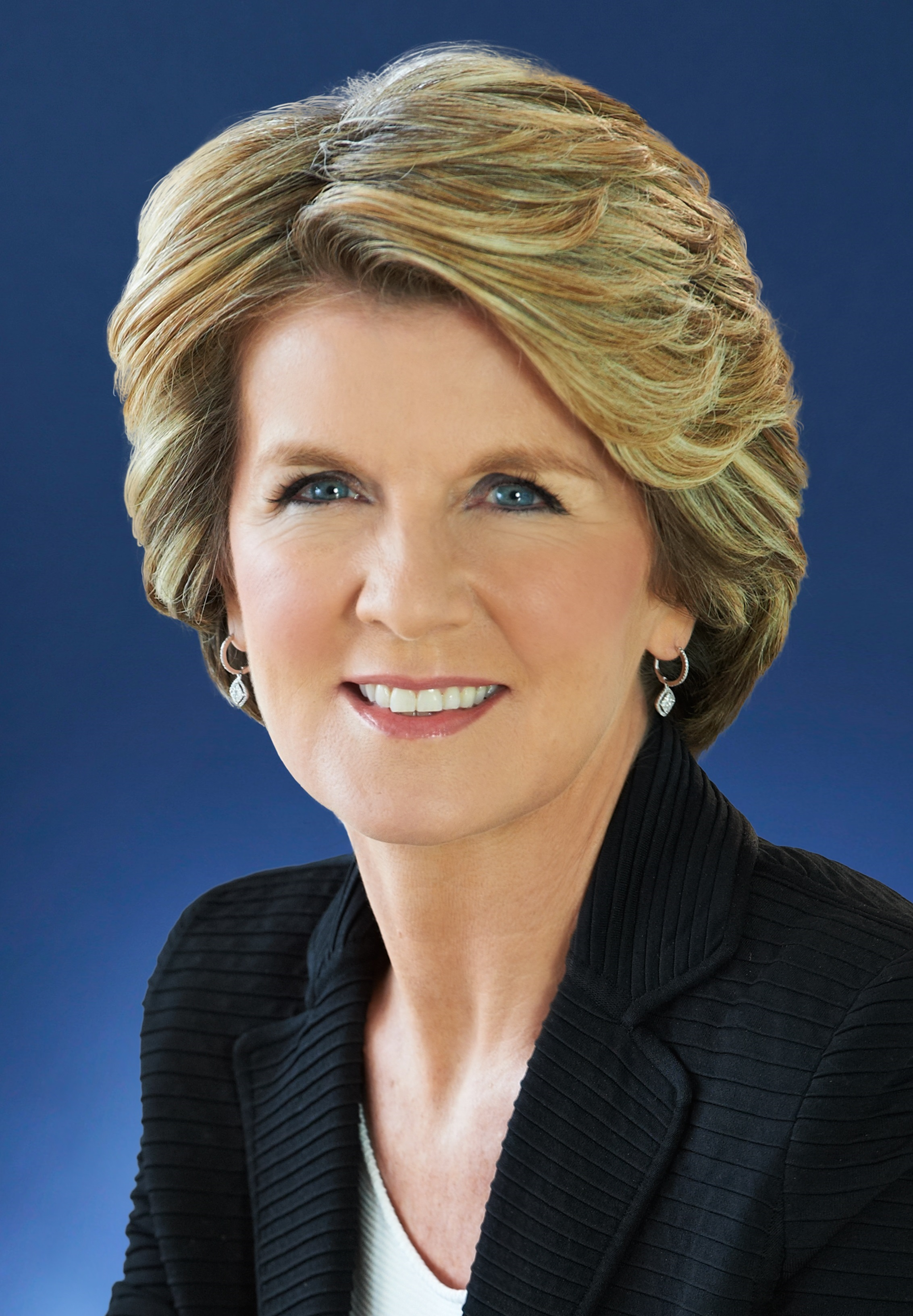
Julie Bishop
First female Minister for Foreign Affairs of Australia

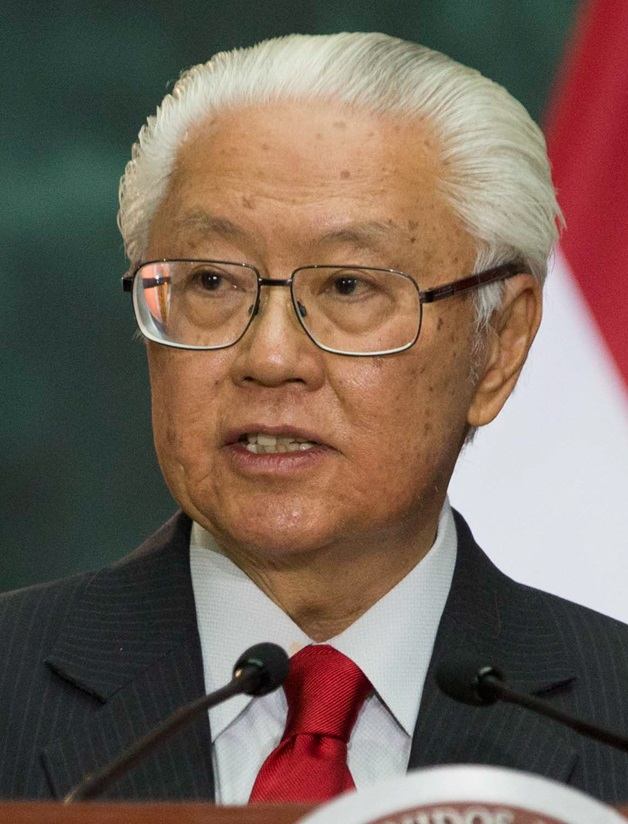
Tony Tan
7th president of the Republic of Singapore

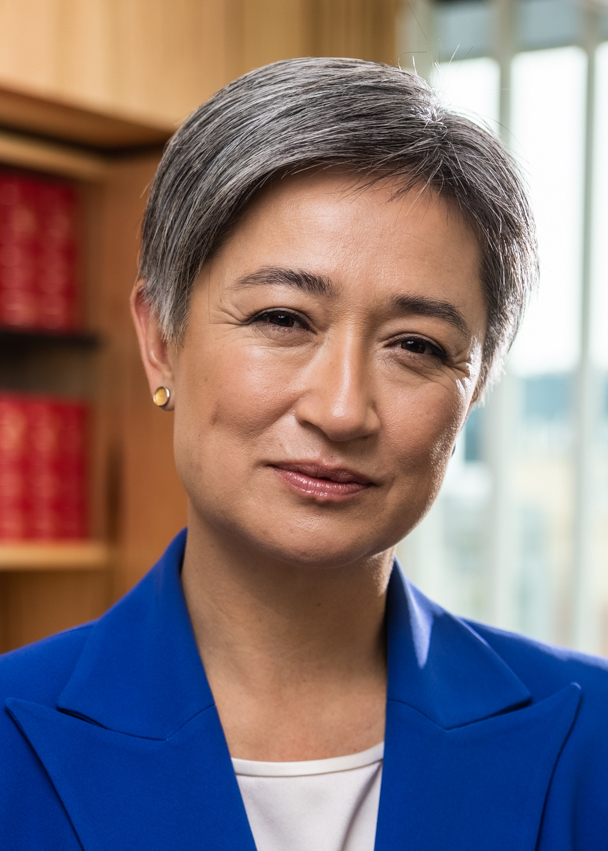
Penny Wong
Current Minister for Foreign Affairs and senate leader

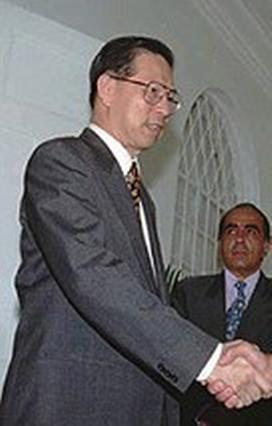
Ong Teng Cheong
5th president of the Republic of Singapore

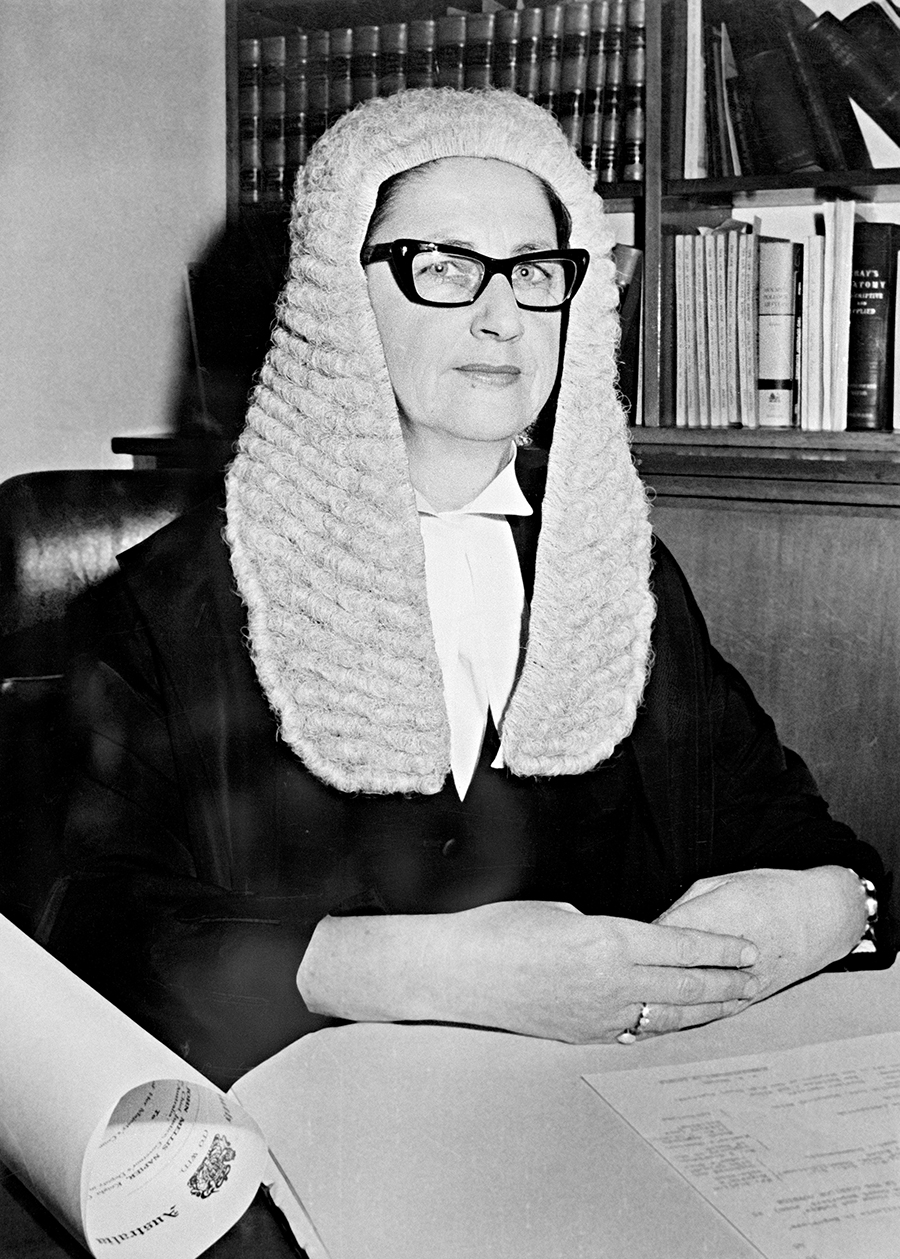
Roma Mitchell
First female Australian judge, chancellor and state governor

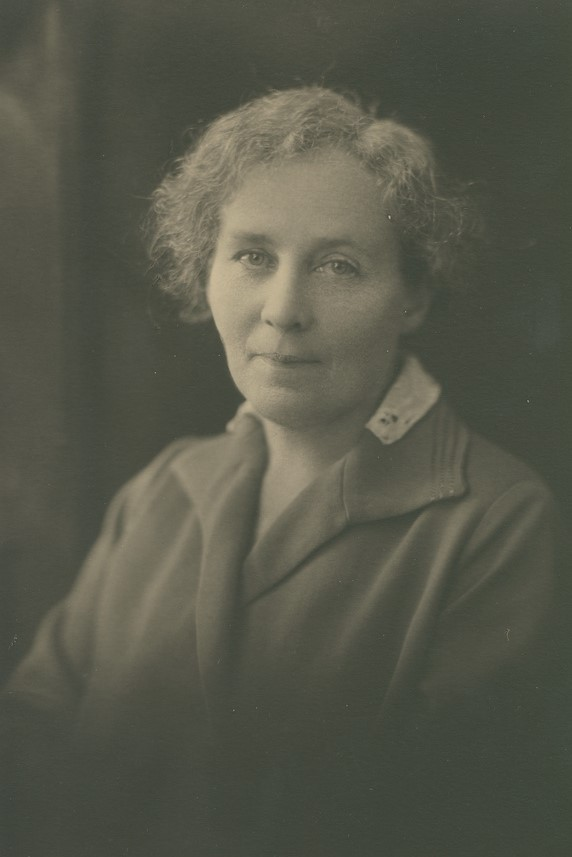
Laura Margaret Hope
First female surgeon in Australia

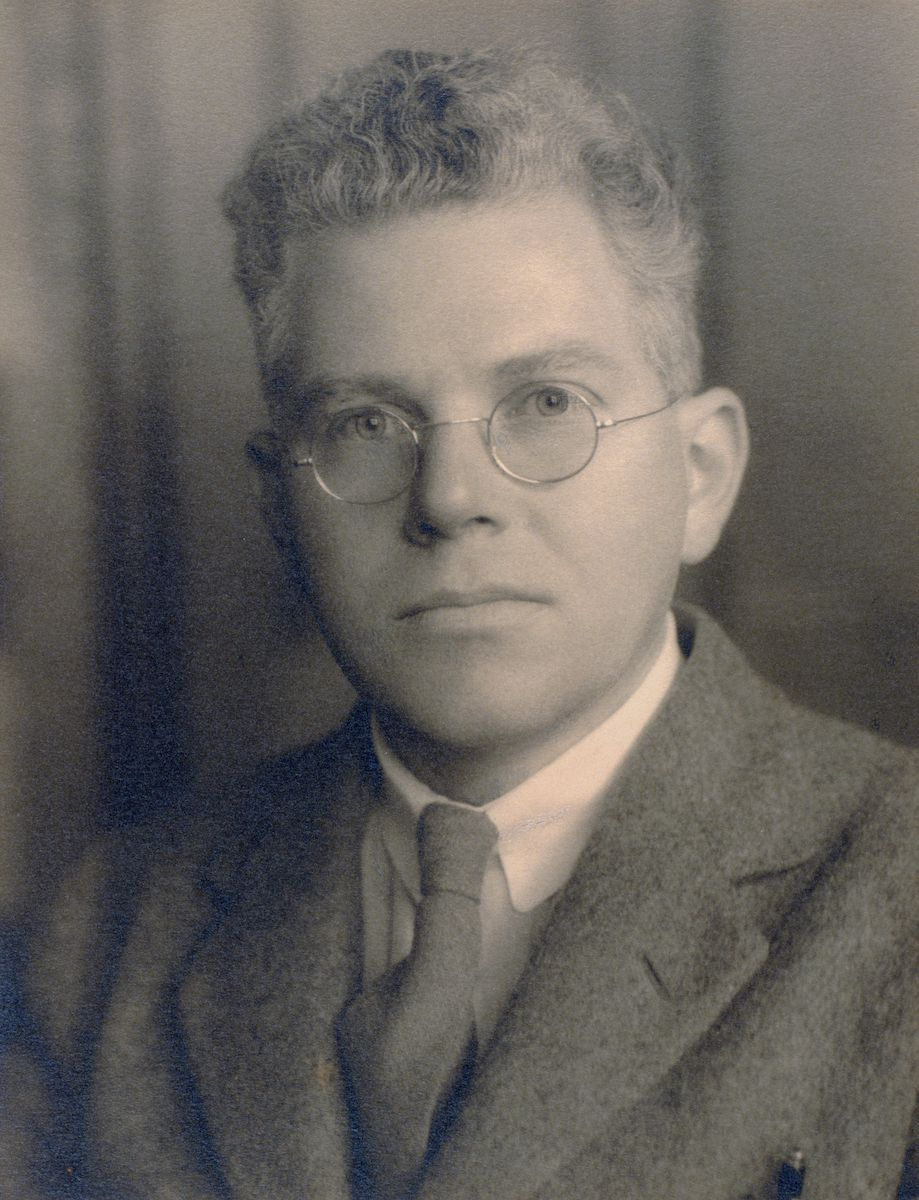
Mark Oliphant
Nuclear physicist and humanitarian

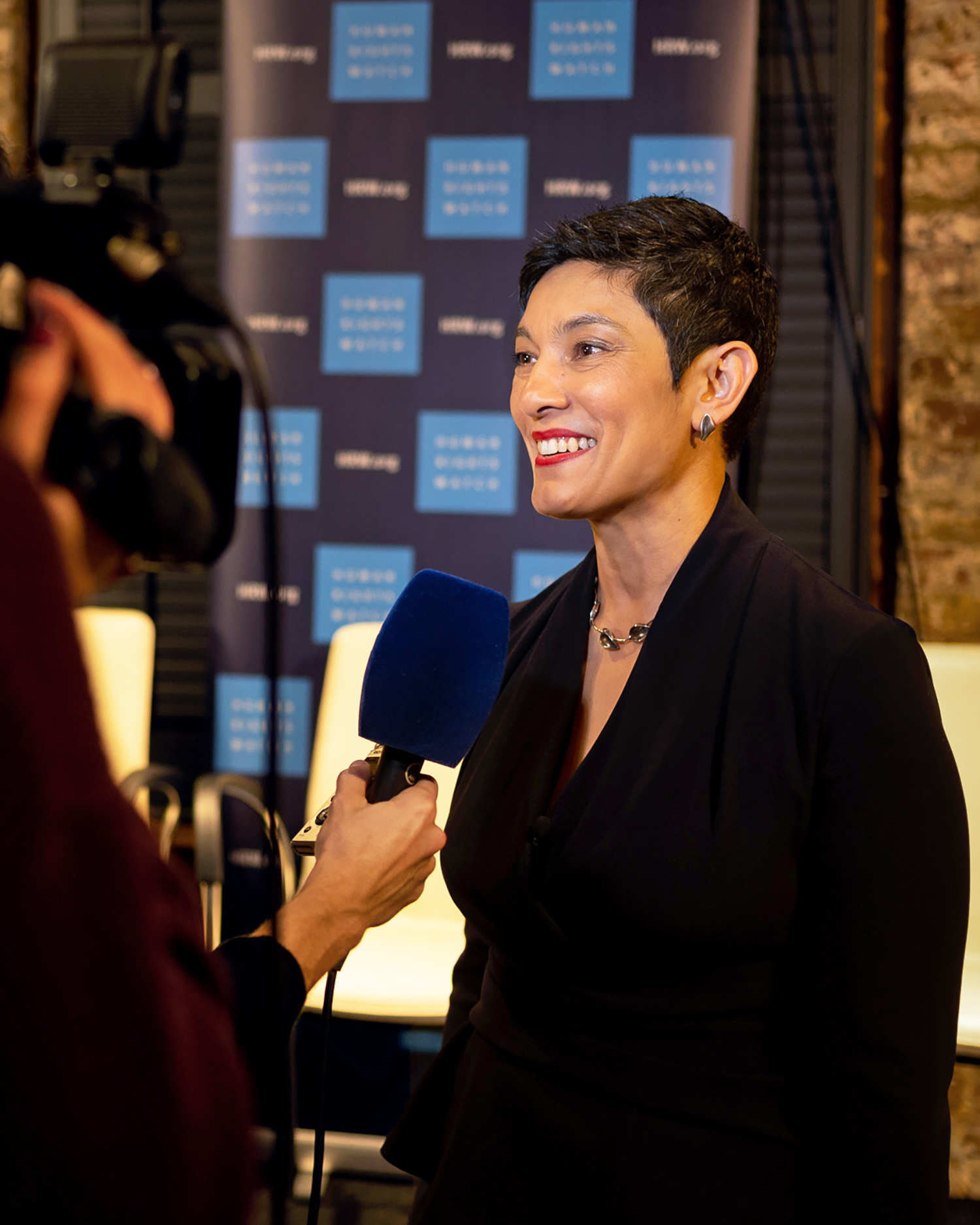
Tirana Hassan
Executive director of Human Rights Watch

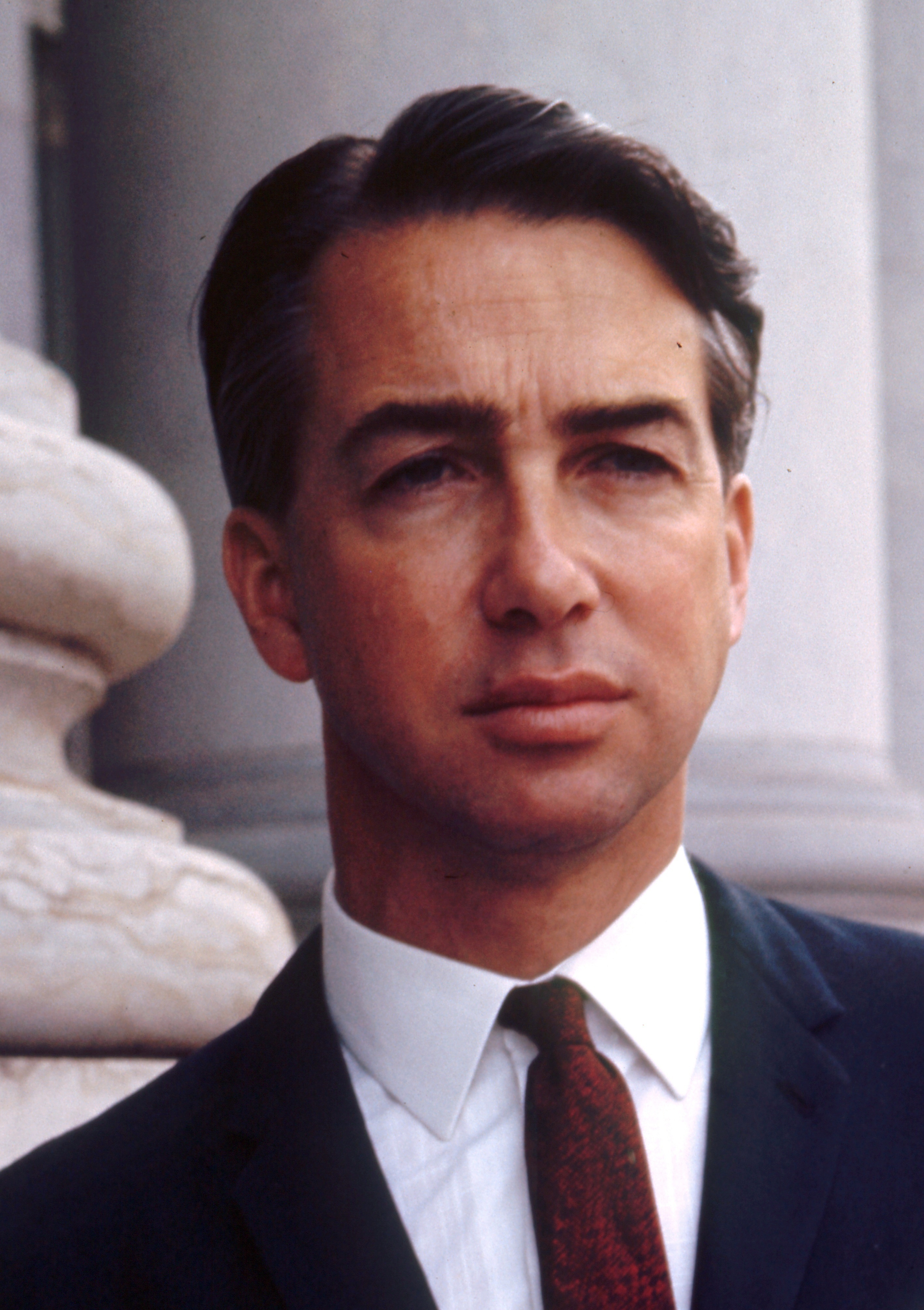
Don Dustan
Former premier of South Australia

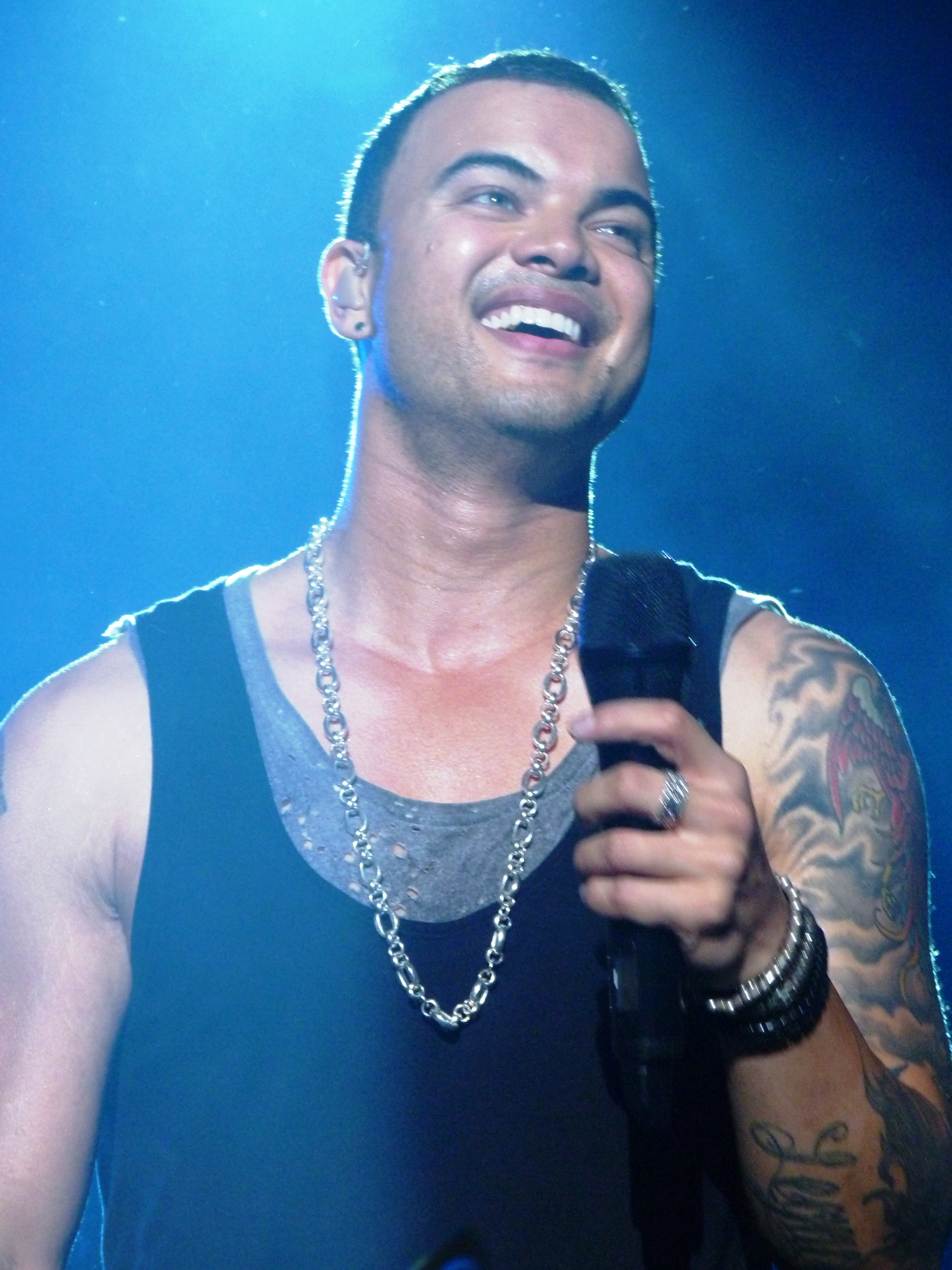
Guy Sebastian
Singer-songwriter and musician

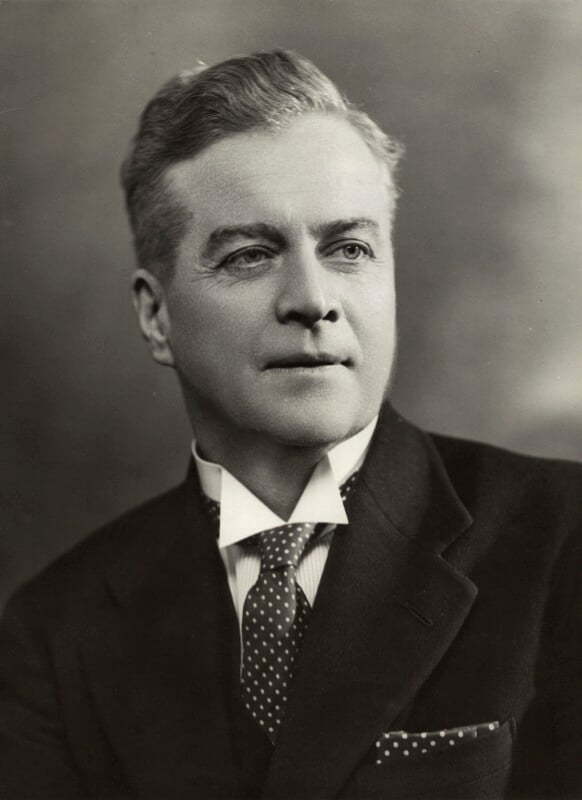
Lionel Logue
Speech and language therapist

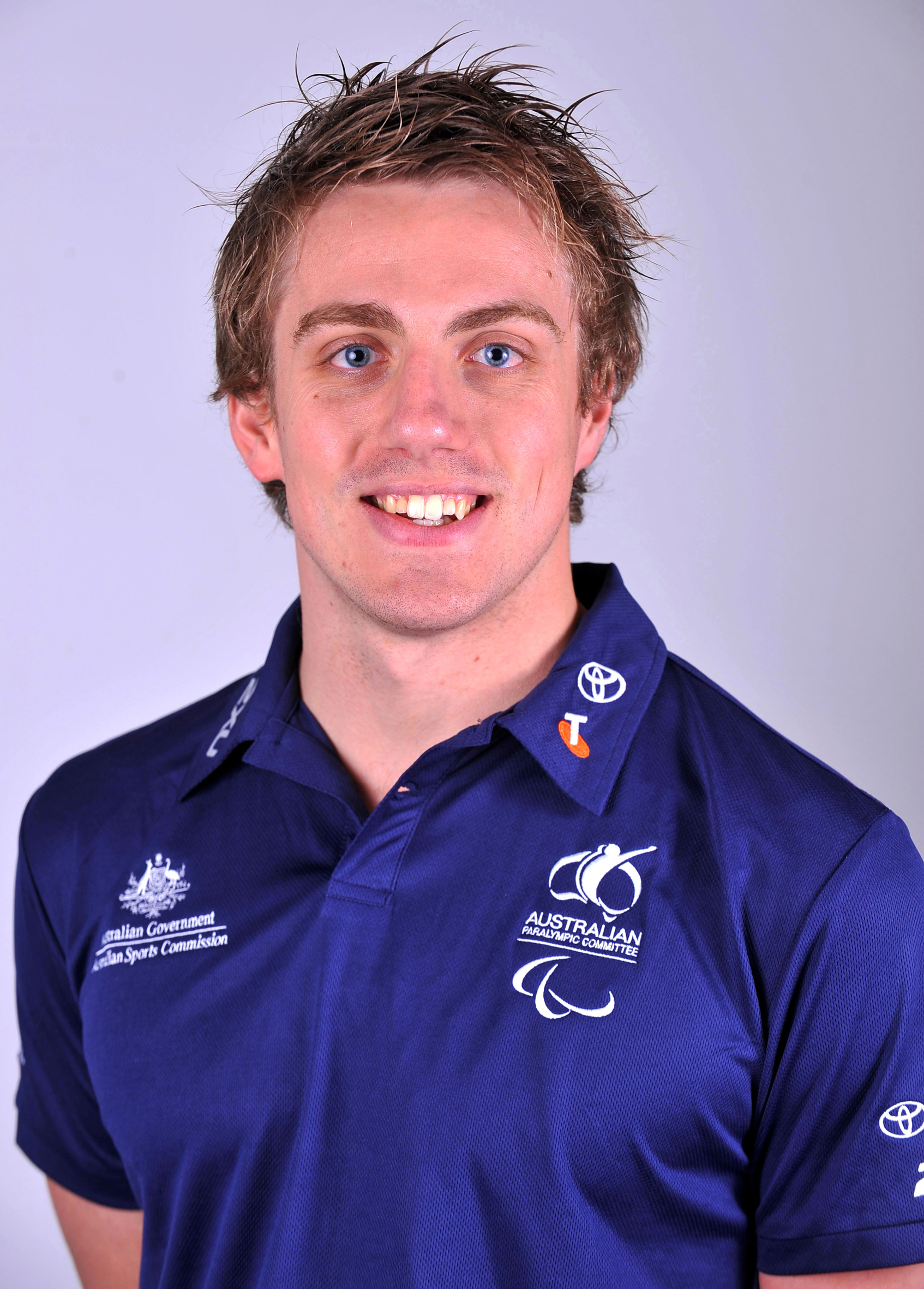
Matthew Cowdrey
Paralympian and state politician

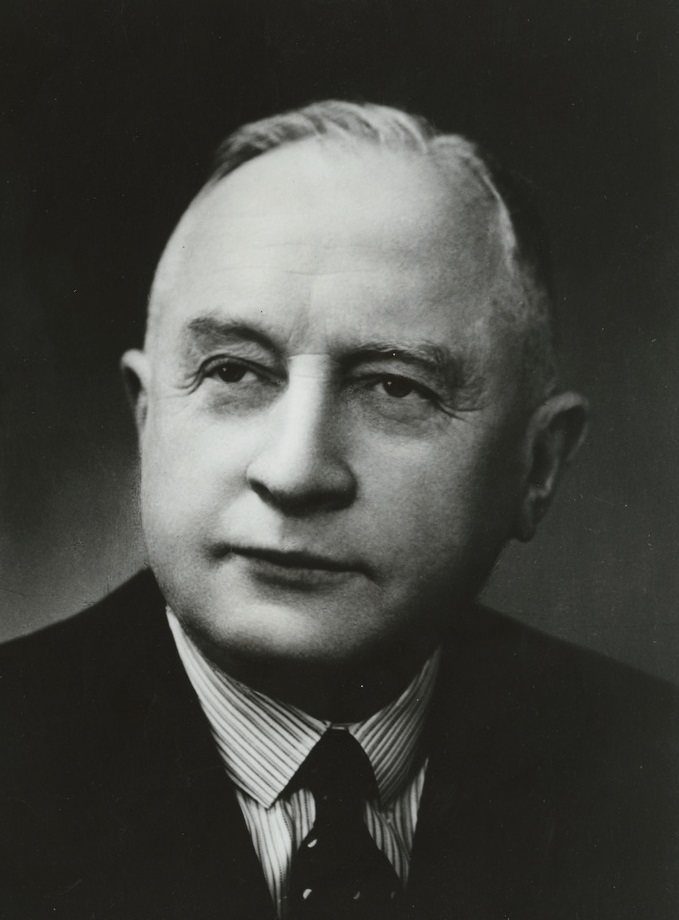
Edward Holden
Industrialist and founder of GM Holden

The university has had a significant impact on the public life of South Australia, having educated many of the state's earliest businesspeople, lawyers, medical professionals and politicians. It has also produced 117 Rhodes scholars, 168 Fulbright scholars and is associated with five Nobel laureates which constitute one-third of Australia's total Nobel laureates. The university throughout its history has been associated with the development of penicillin, space exploration, sunscreen, the military tank, Wi-Fi, polymer banknotes and X-ray crystallography, and the study of viticulture and oenology.

Notable alumni of the university include the first female Australian prime minister Julia Gillard, Singaporean presidents Tony Tan and Ong Teng Cheong, the first Australian-born astronaut Andy Thomas, the first demonstrator of nuclear fusion Mark Oliphant, singer-songwriter Guy Sebastian, the industrialist Edward Holden who founded Australian automobile manufacturer GM Holden, the speech therapist Lionel Logue who helped King George VI manage his stammer, the inventor of modern sunscreen Milton Blake and Neil Weste whose advancements in wireless communications are widely used. Several Olympians and Paralympians have also studied at the university including Matthew Cowdrey. Incumbent office-holders include the state premier Peter Malinauskas, state governor Frances Adamson, the Human Rights Watch executive director Tirana Hassan, the national senate leader Penny Wong, the Australian National University chancellor Julie Bishop and several federal cabinet ministers.

=== Women's education ===
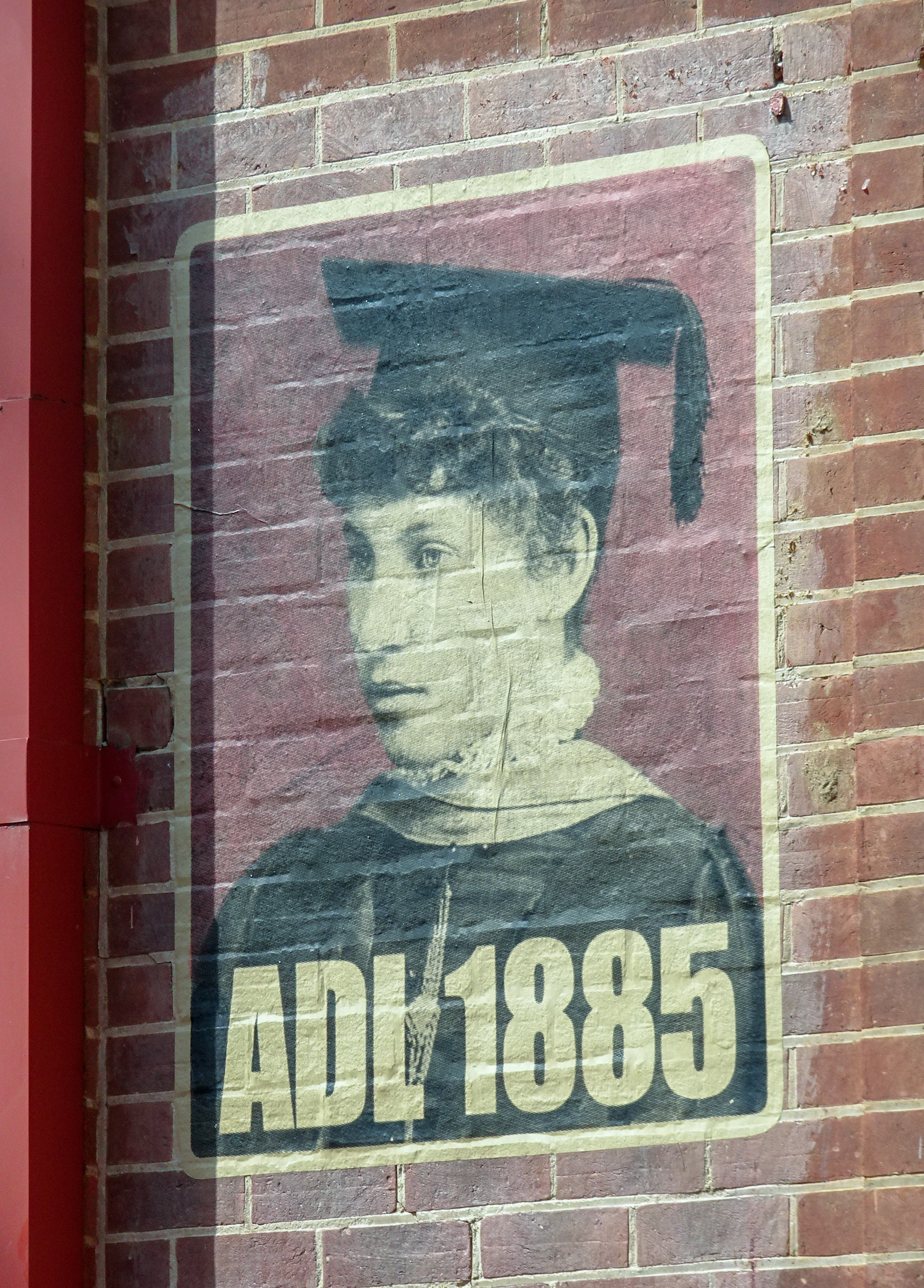
Mural to Edith Emily Dornwell, Australia's first BSc graduate

Following a royal charter granted by Queen Victoria in 1881, the university became the second university in the English-speaking world to formally admit women to degree-conferring programs on equal terms as men, contributing to a number of firsts in the history of women's education in Australia. Its first female graduate was Edith Emily Dornwell who concurrently became the first person in Australia to receive the degree of Bachelor of Science in 1885. The university also graduated Australia's first female surgeon Laura Margaret Fowler in 1891. Ruby Claudia Davy was the first Australian woman to receive a doctorate in music in 1918. Other notable firsts also include Winifred Kiek, Margaret Reid and Janine Haines. In 1914, the university was also the first to elect a woman, Helen Mayo, to a university council in Australia. It is also the alma mater of Roma Mitchell who was Australia's first female judge, the first woman to be a Queen's Counsel, a chancellor of an Australian university and the governor of an Australian state. Australia's first female prime minister Julia Gillard had also studied at the university and the first Aboriginal Rhodes Scholar Rebecca Richards in 2010.

=== Nobel laureates ===
Nobel laureates associated with the university:

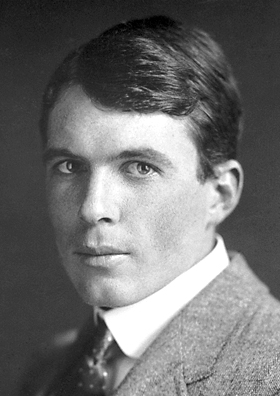
Lawrence Bragg
Physicist

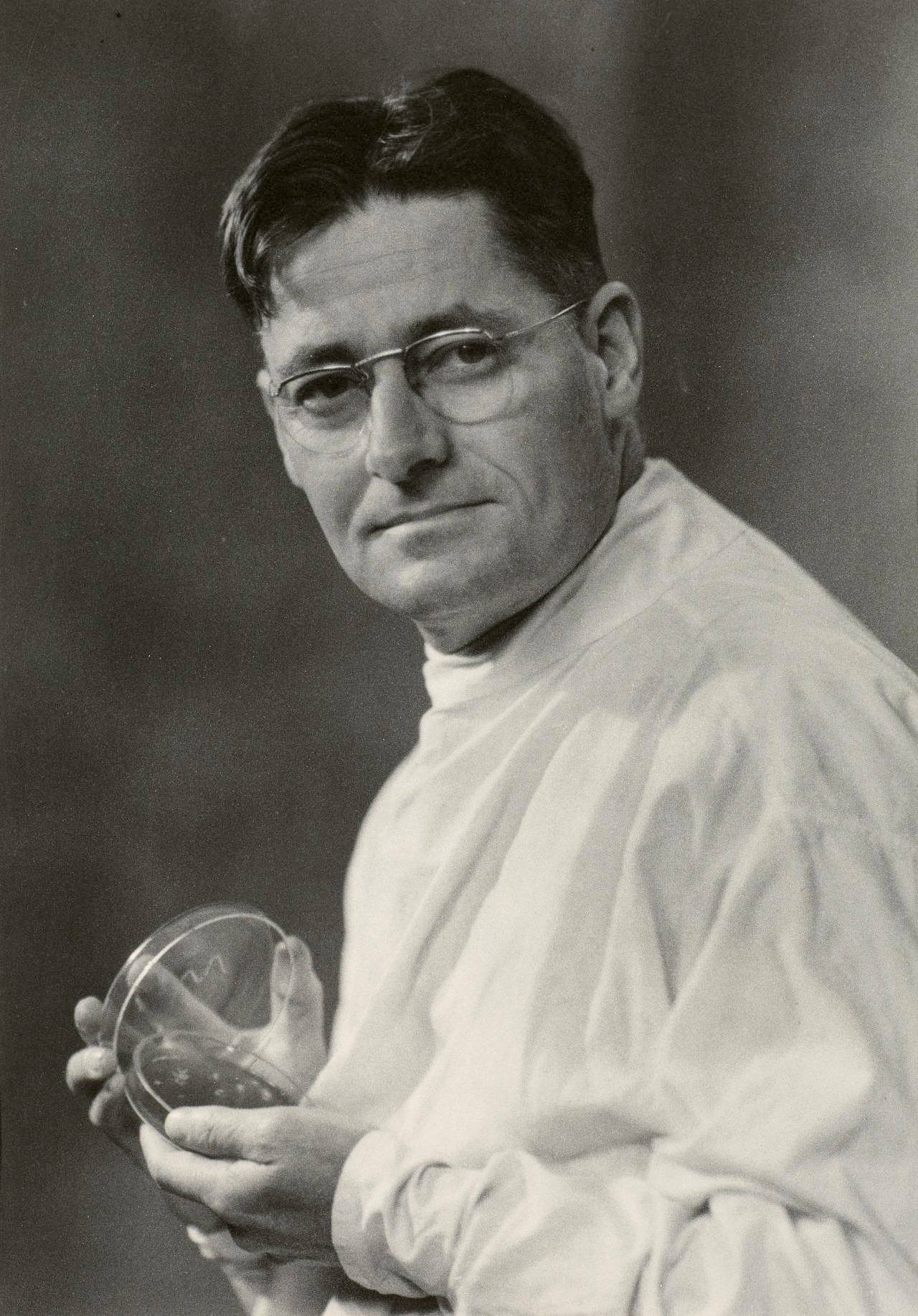
Howard Florey
Pharmacologist

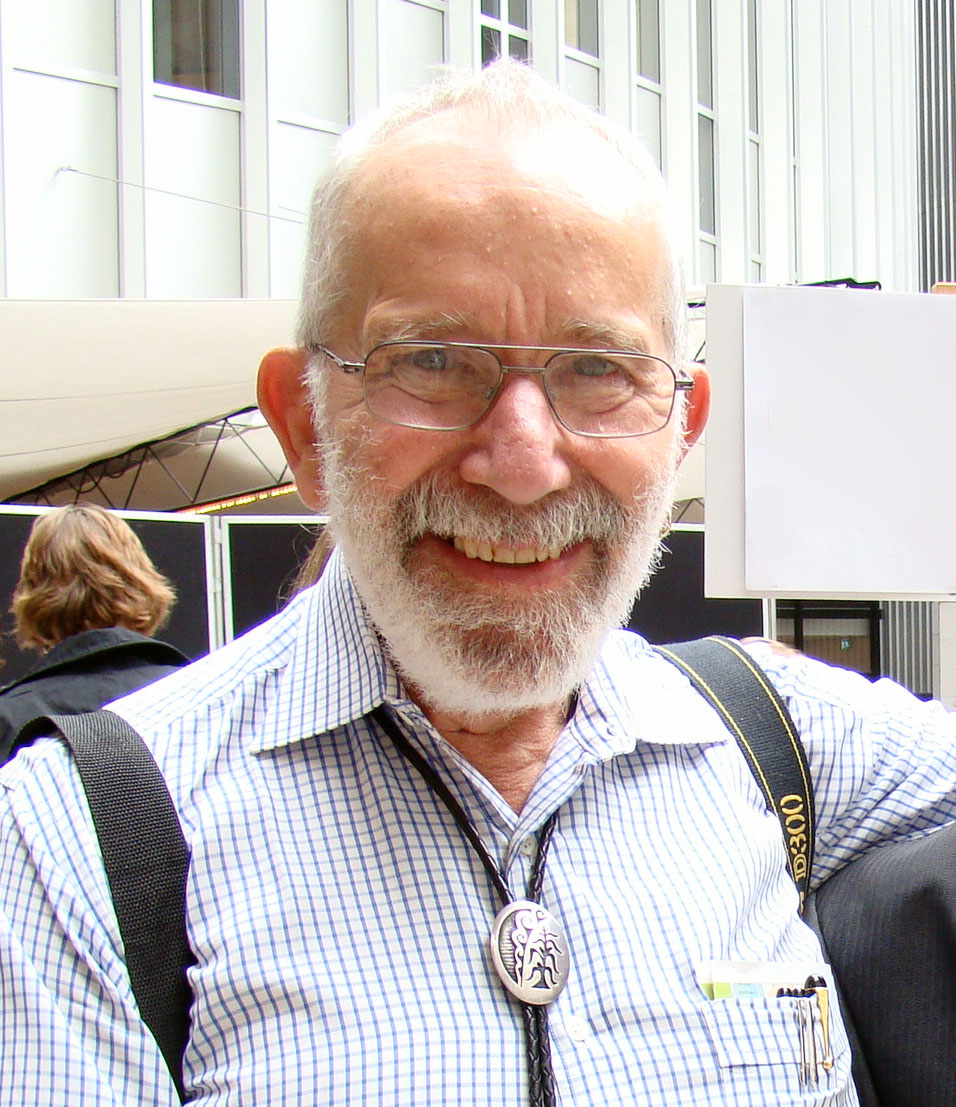
Robin Warren
Pathologist

Nobel laureates associated with the university include alumni Lawrence Bragg, who held the record for the youngest laureate ever until 2014, co-recipient with his father William Henry Bragg for their work in x-ray crystallography in 1915. Howard Florey, a pharmacologist and pathologist, shared the 1945 Nobel Prize in Physiology or Medicine with Alexander Fleming and Ernst Chain for their role in the development of penicillin. J. M. Coetzee, a novelist and member of the faculty, had won the Nobel Prize in Literature in 2003. Robin Warren was a pathologist who, alongside Barry Marshall, discovered that peptic ulcers were largely caused by the infection Helicobacter pylori, graduated from the university in 1961. Warren and Marshall won the Nobel Prize in Physiology or Medicine for their discovery in 2005.

== Controversies ==
=== University merger ===
==== Initial merger discussions ====
The University of Adelaide and the University of South Australia had previously engaged to discuss a merger in 2018 but failed due to disagreements from the latter about the post-merger leadership structure.

==== Opinion polling on staff ====
The National Tertiary Education Union SA conducted a survey of 1,100 university staff and found that three-quarters of respondents were against the merger. In addition, the state government has been accused of coercing the universities to agree to merge, indicating that a commission of inquiry would be established to find ways to compel the two universities to merge had their councils refused to do so, with less financial support available.

Andrew Miller, the state secretary of the union, raised concerns that staff were under "extreme psychosocial pressure" to meet the 2026 launch deadline. Backing his claims with communications from the Integration Management Office staff responsible for merging the two institutions, he added that the "Game of Thrones" perception among staff competing "for the final spots of the new Adelaide University" was causing tensions, breakdowns and disharmony. The institutions' vice-chancellors David Lloyd and Peter Høj criticised the claims, referring to them as "whispers of Little Birds or Littlefingers", though they had previously admitted that the "two-by-two approach across the board" was "not as linear as first conceived".

In 2025, a FOI document obtained by The Australian found an increase in bullying and harassment reports at the university following the announcement of the merger. It added concerns from staff that the merger would result in a "meat grinder producing poorly educated students" that would be seen as "walking dollar signs".

The post-merger plan to switch to a trimester academic calendar has also been criticised by the union whose internal poll showed that more than 4 in 5 members were against the move.

==== Land re-development ====
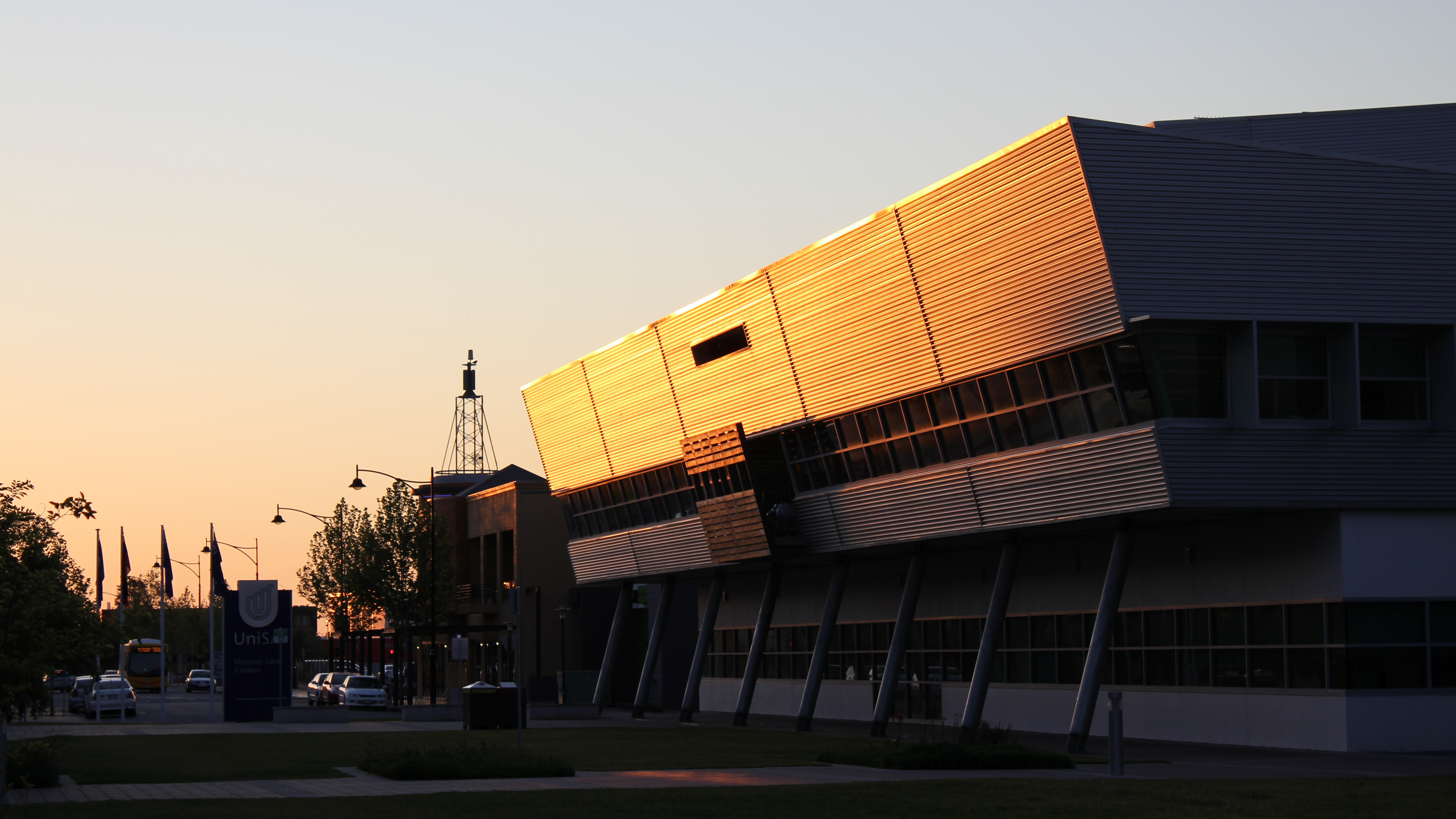
Around half of UniSA's Mawson Lakes campus will be sold for development

In February 2024, the State Government drew criticism for its plans to convert land it had purchased from two University of South Australia campuses for housing and commercial re-development. As part of the merger agreement, the land was to be sold to the South Australian Government for A$114.5 million and leased back to the university for a period of up to 10 years. Following the release of several internal FOI documents retrieved by InDaily from the Premier's Office, it was later revealed that the land was "earmarked for future development" for residential and commercial purposes.

The original media release replaced the phrase with "short-term transitional lease to university", referring to the leaseback period of 10 years, following concerns from UniSA vice-chancellor David Lloyd that the original draft would "create enormous community reaction which will be particularly unhelpful at this time". The land sales account for the entirety of the Magill campus and approximately 50% of the Mawson Lakes campus.

=== Staff conduct ===
In May 2020, then vice-chancellor Peter Rathjen commenced an indefinite leave of absence after chancellor Kevin Scarce resigned without public explanation the previous day. Later in the week, the Independent Commissioner Against Corruption (ICAC) confirmed he was investigating allegations of improper conduct by the vice-chancellor of the University of Adelaide. Rathjen, accused of engaging in "a personal relationship with a staff member", was succeeded by acting vice-chancellor Mike Brooks. Rathjen formally resigned in July 2020, "due to ill health". In August 2020, the ICAC found that Rathjen had committed "serious misconduct" by sexually harassing two University of Adelaide colleagues, had lied to the then-chancellor Kevin Scarce, and also lied to the commissioner in his evidence with respect to an investigation of sexual misconduct with a postgraduate student when he was employed at the University of Melbourne. The ICAC Commissioner Bruce Lander acknowledged there were "further issues" in the full 170-page report on the investigation which he chose not to release due to privacy concerns surrounding the victims, instead releasing an abridged 12-page version 'Statement about an Investigation: Misconduct by the Vice-Chancellor of the University of Adelaide'. In determining his findings, the commissioner relied in part on the personal blog of US journalist Michael Balter, who documented Rathjens prior history of sexual harassment, and was largely responsible for bringing the matter to the public's attention, and ultimately ICAC's. Claiming ill-health, Rathjen formally resigned in July 2020 and, despite the ICAC Commissioner's findings, received a large payout from the university.

== Gallery ==
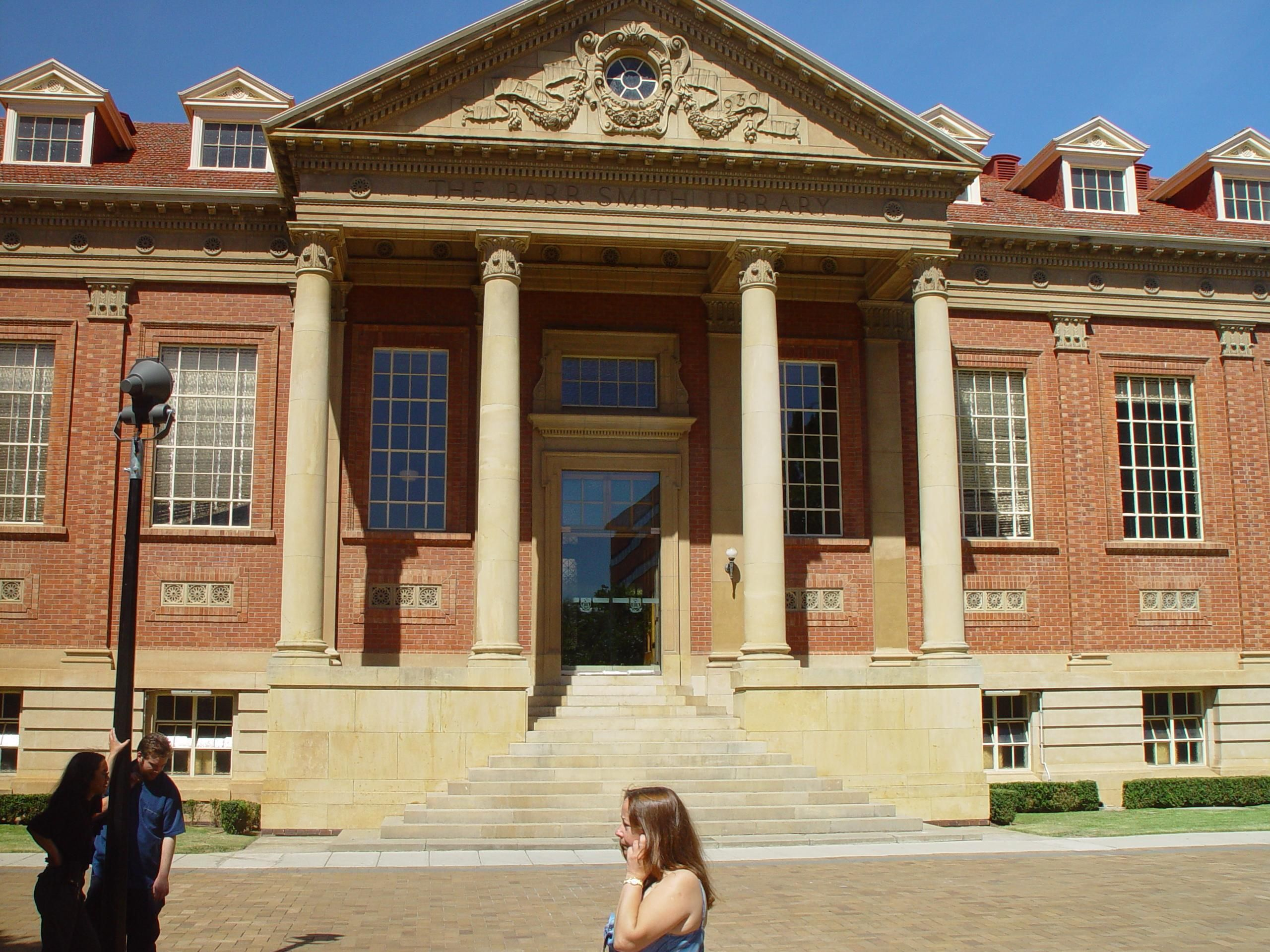
Barr Smith Library

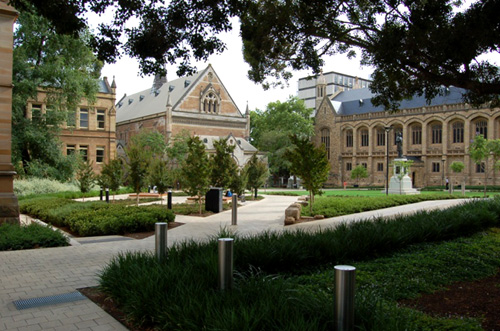
University buildings

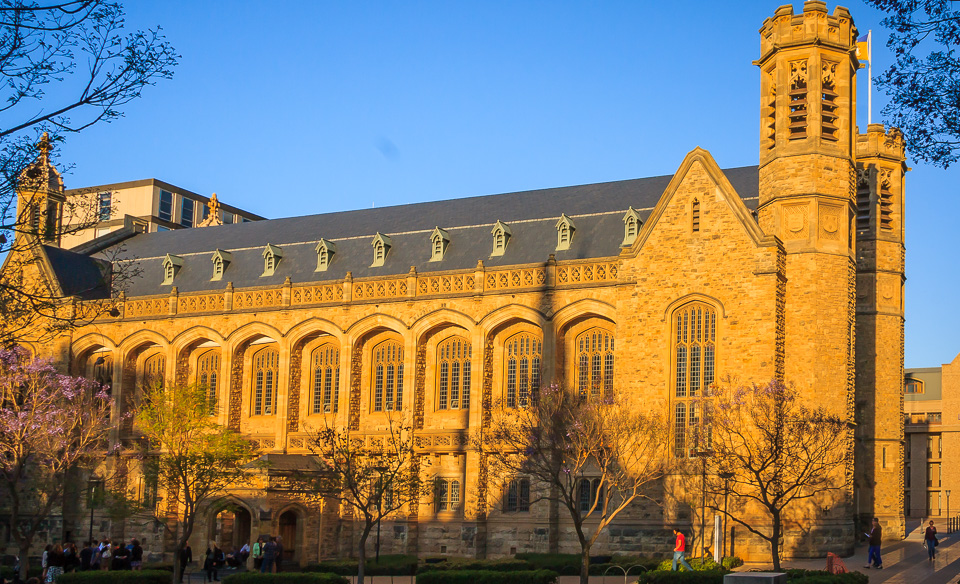
Bonython Hall during sunset

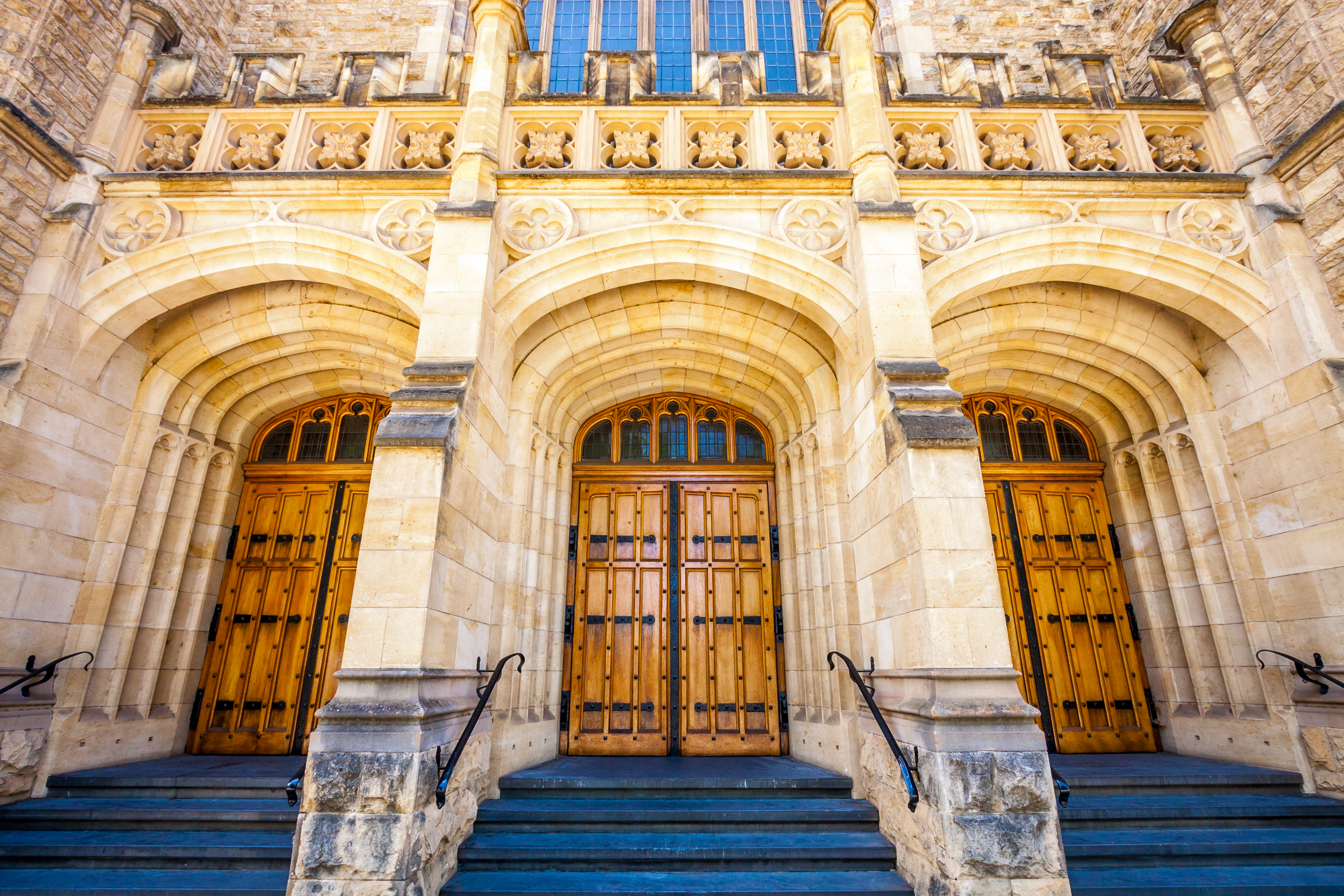
Entrance to Bonython Hall

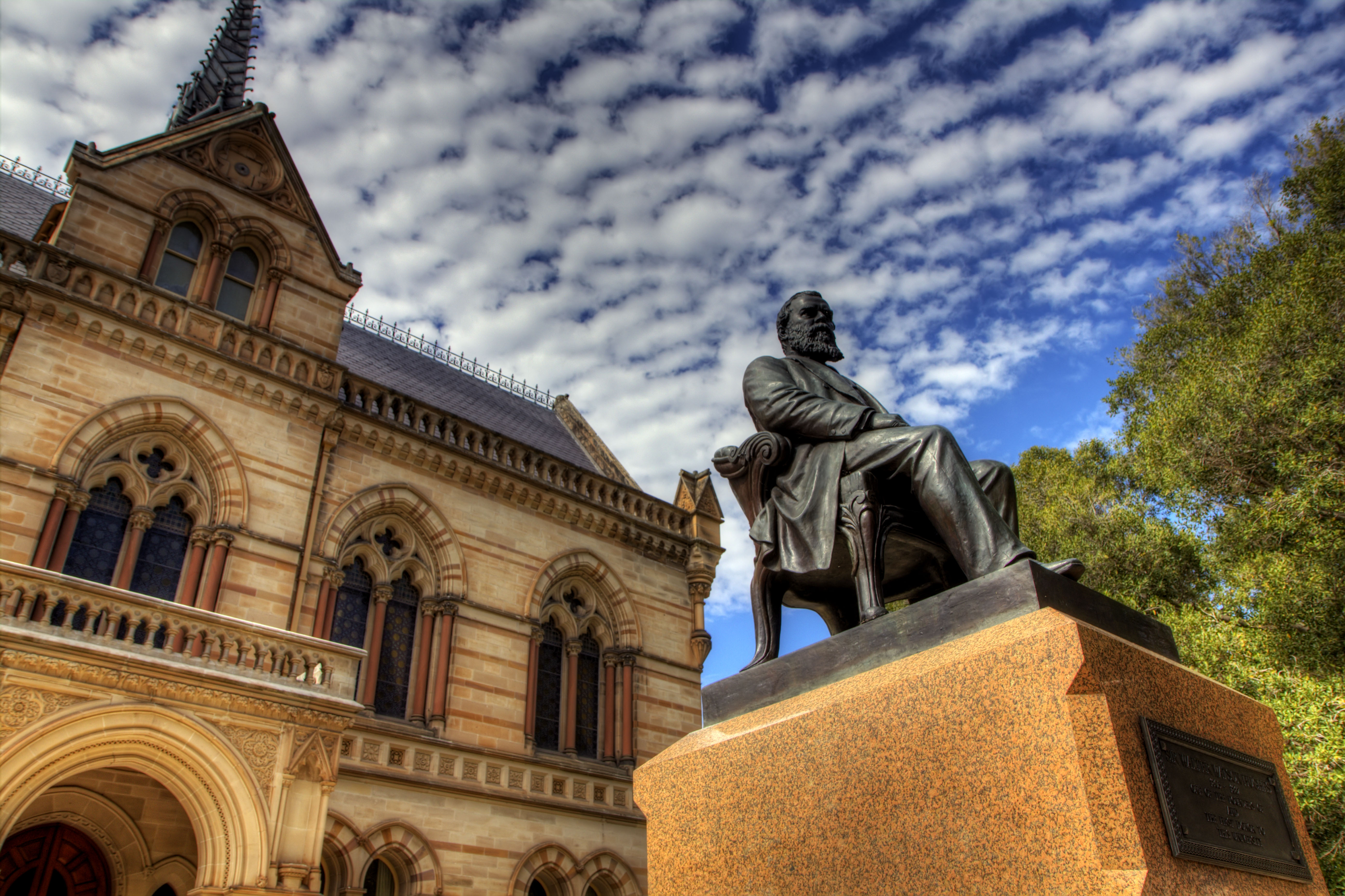
Statue of Walter Hughes

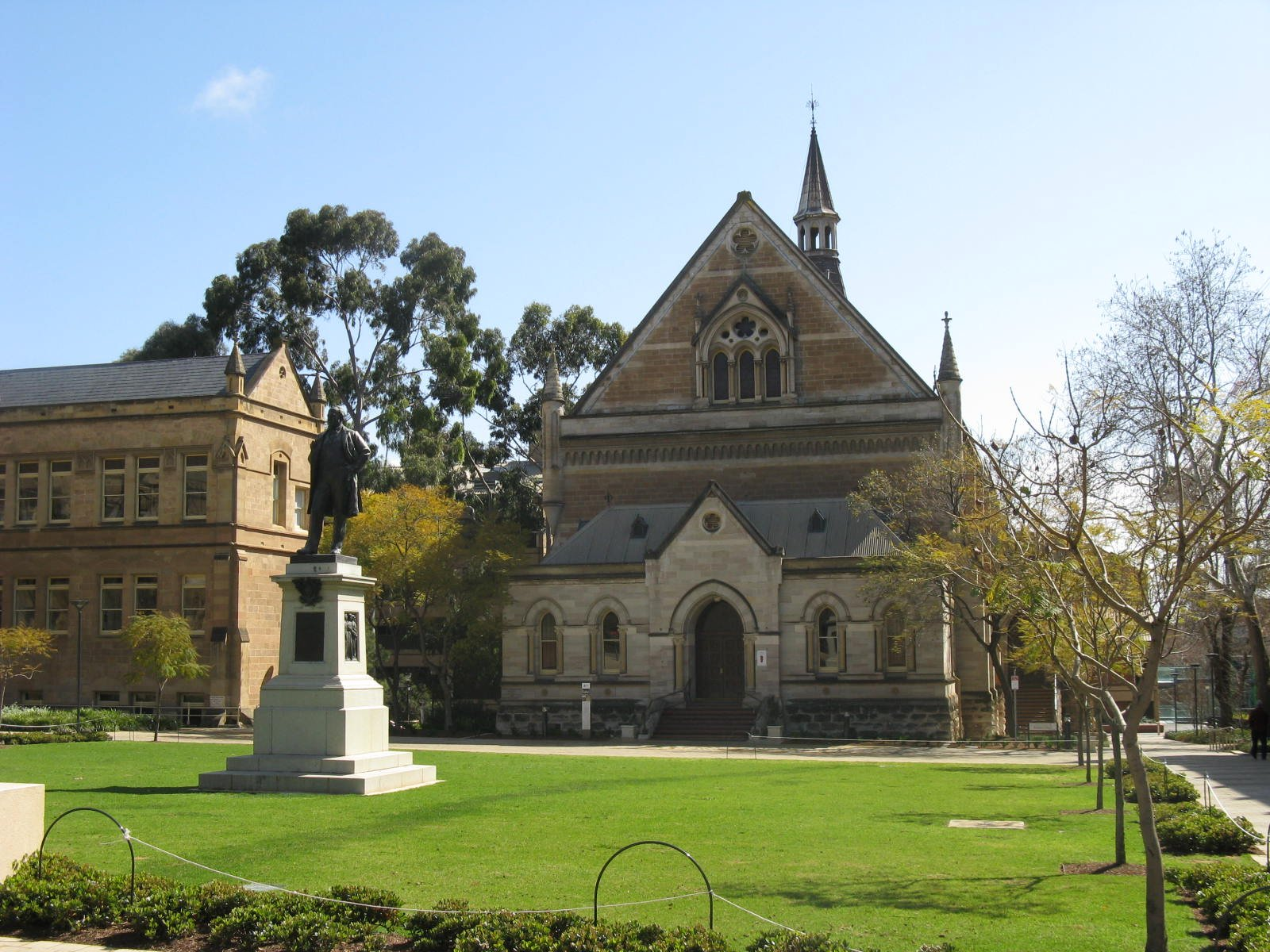
Elder Conservatorium

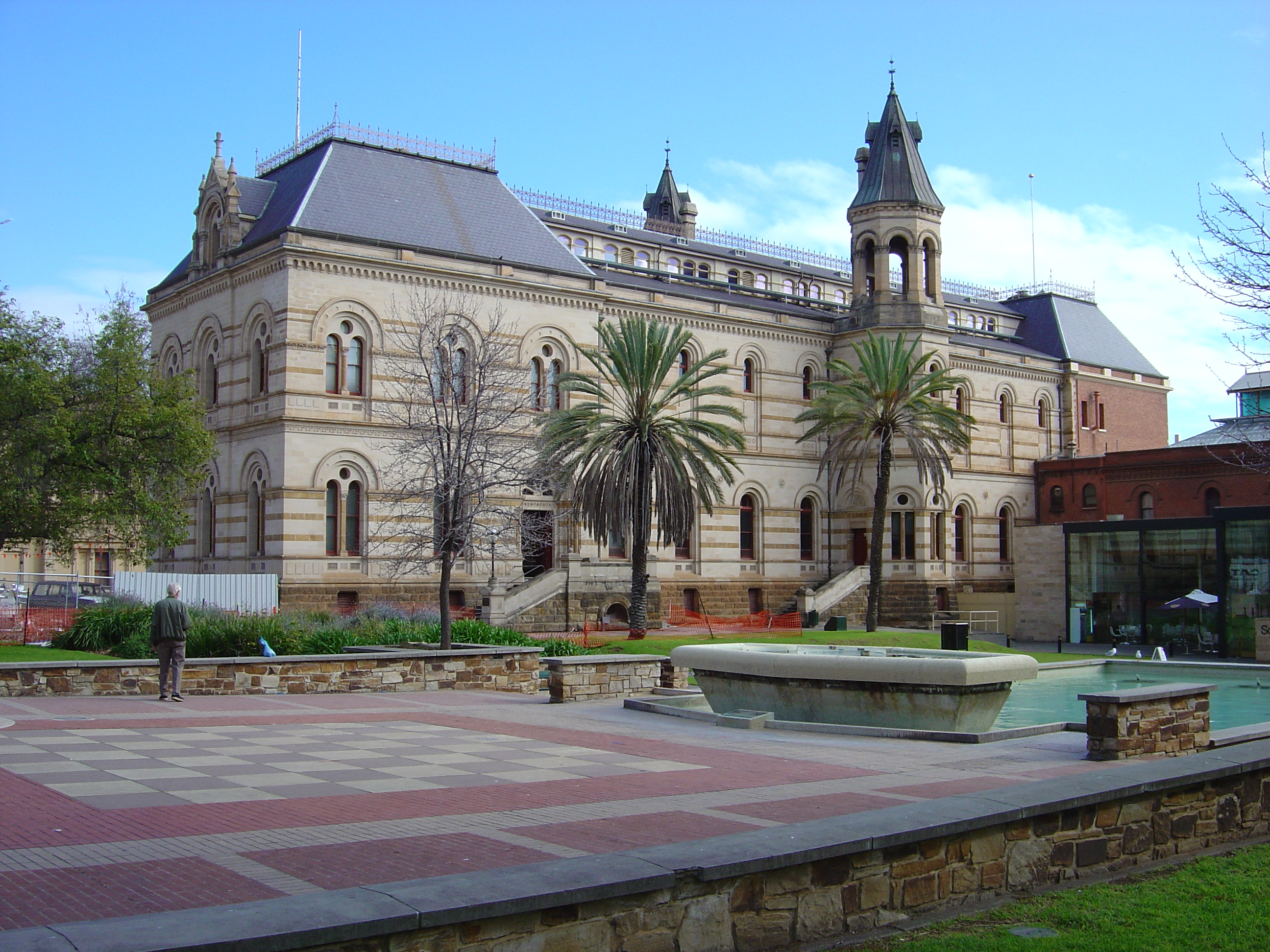
SA State Library

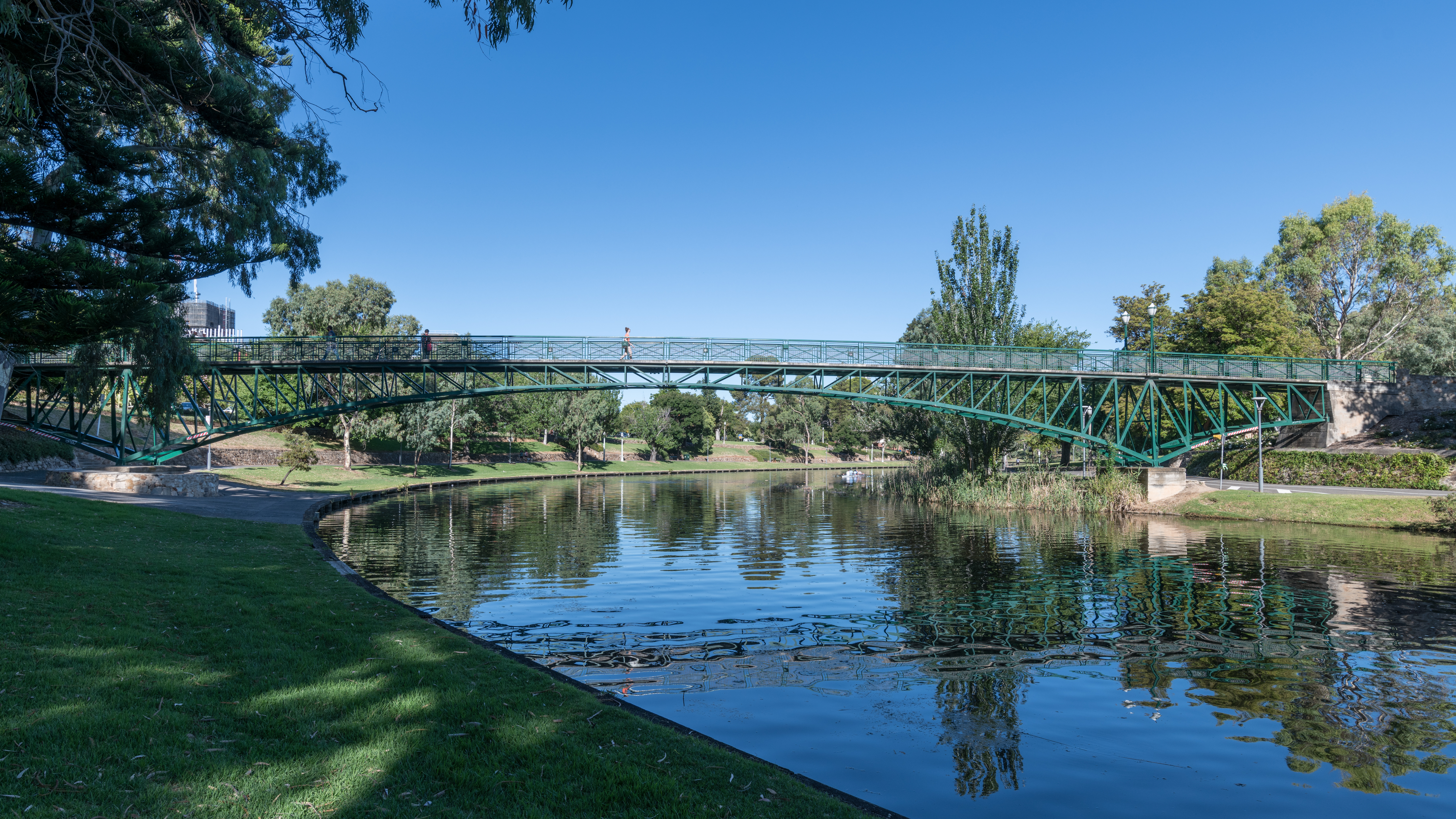
Adelaide University Footbridge

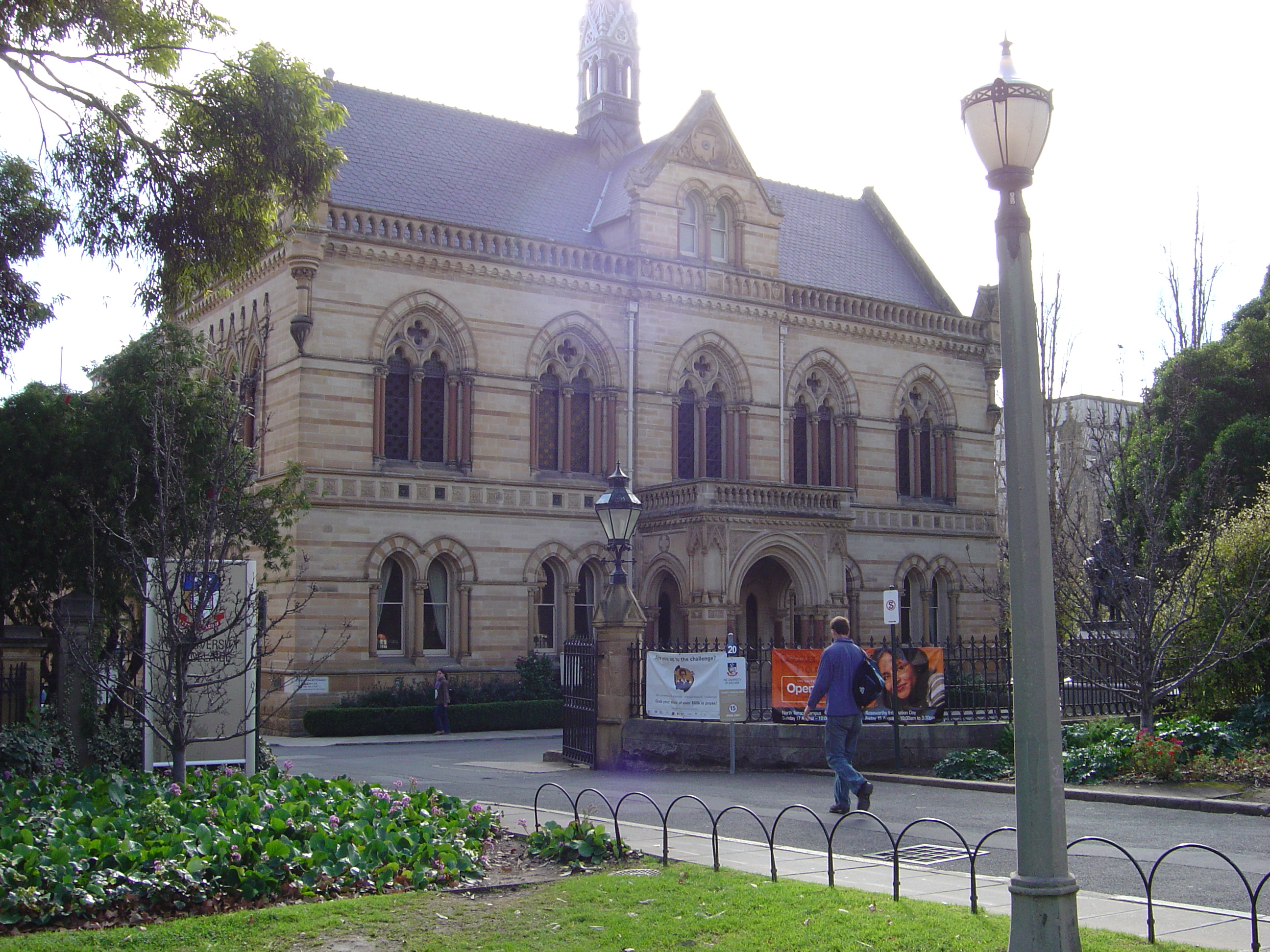
Mitchell Building

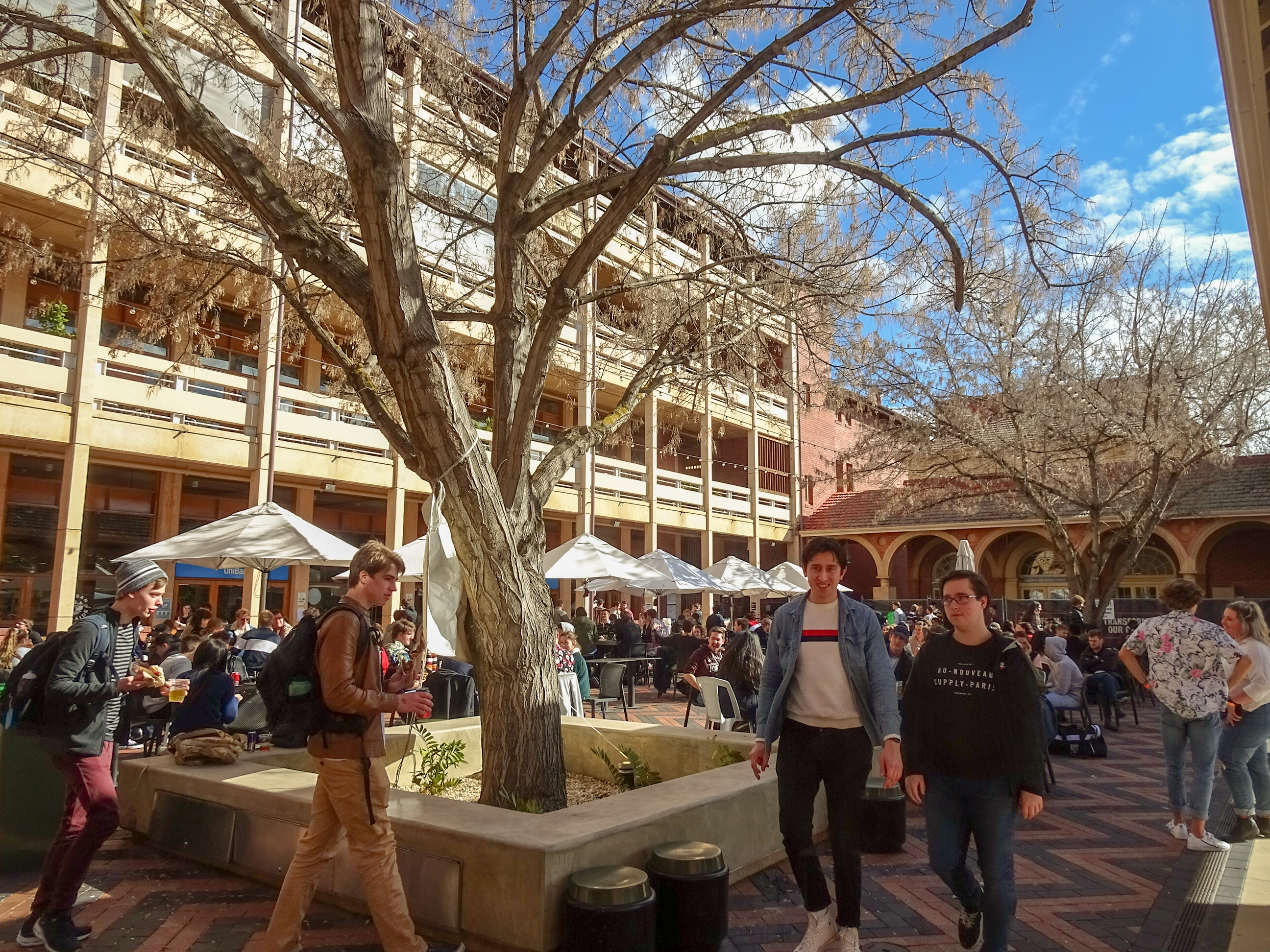
Courtyard with students

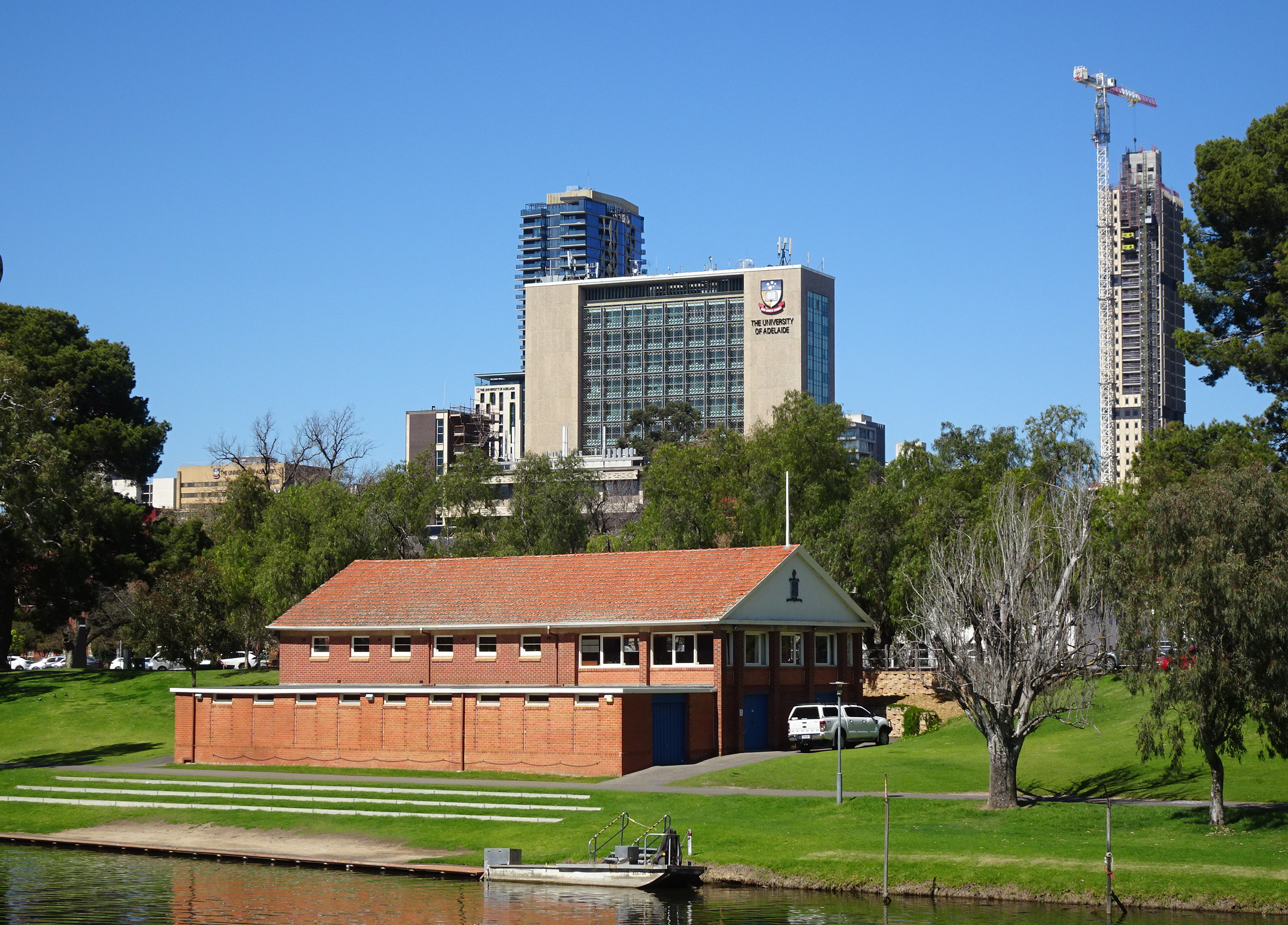
View across the River Torrens

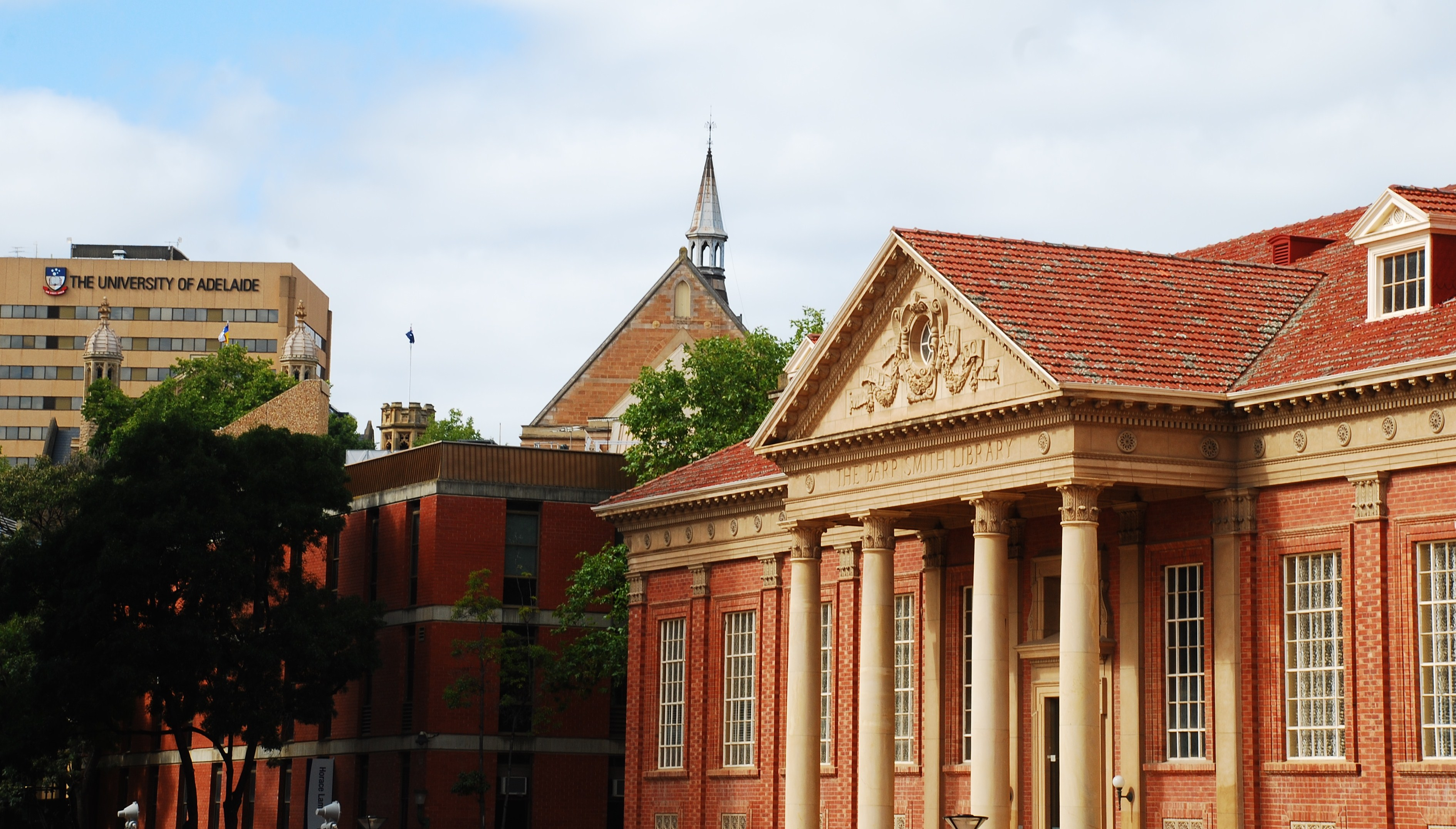
View across Barr Smith Library

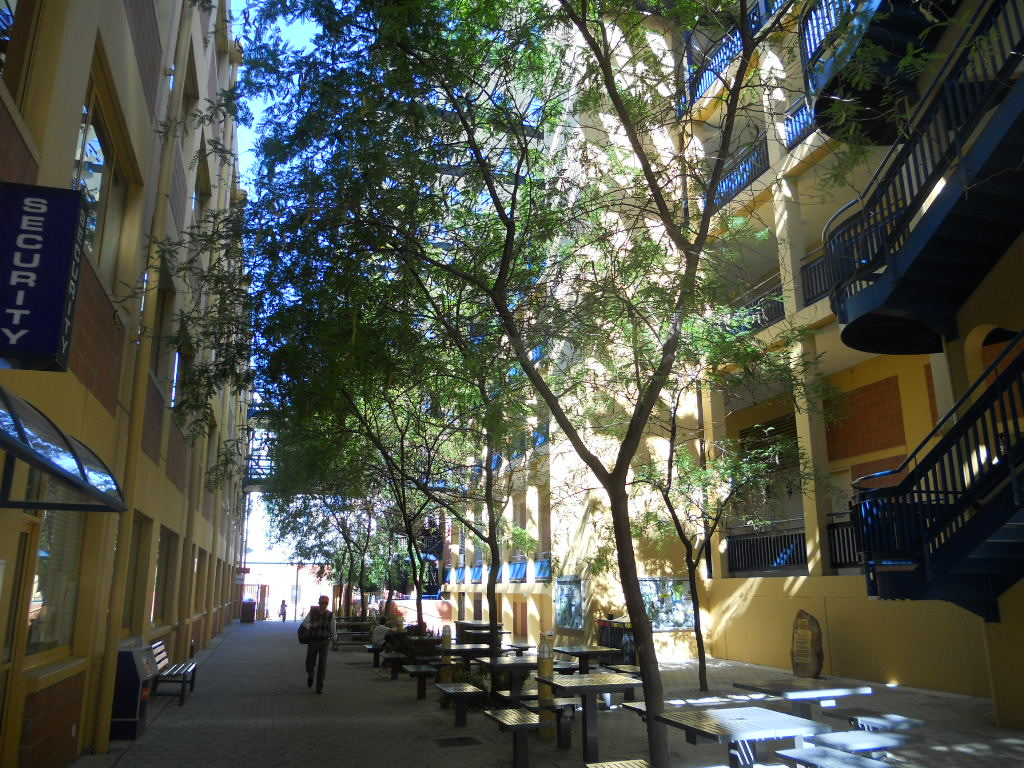
Shaded courtyard

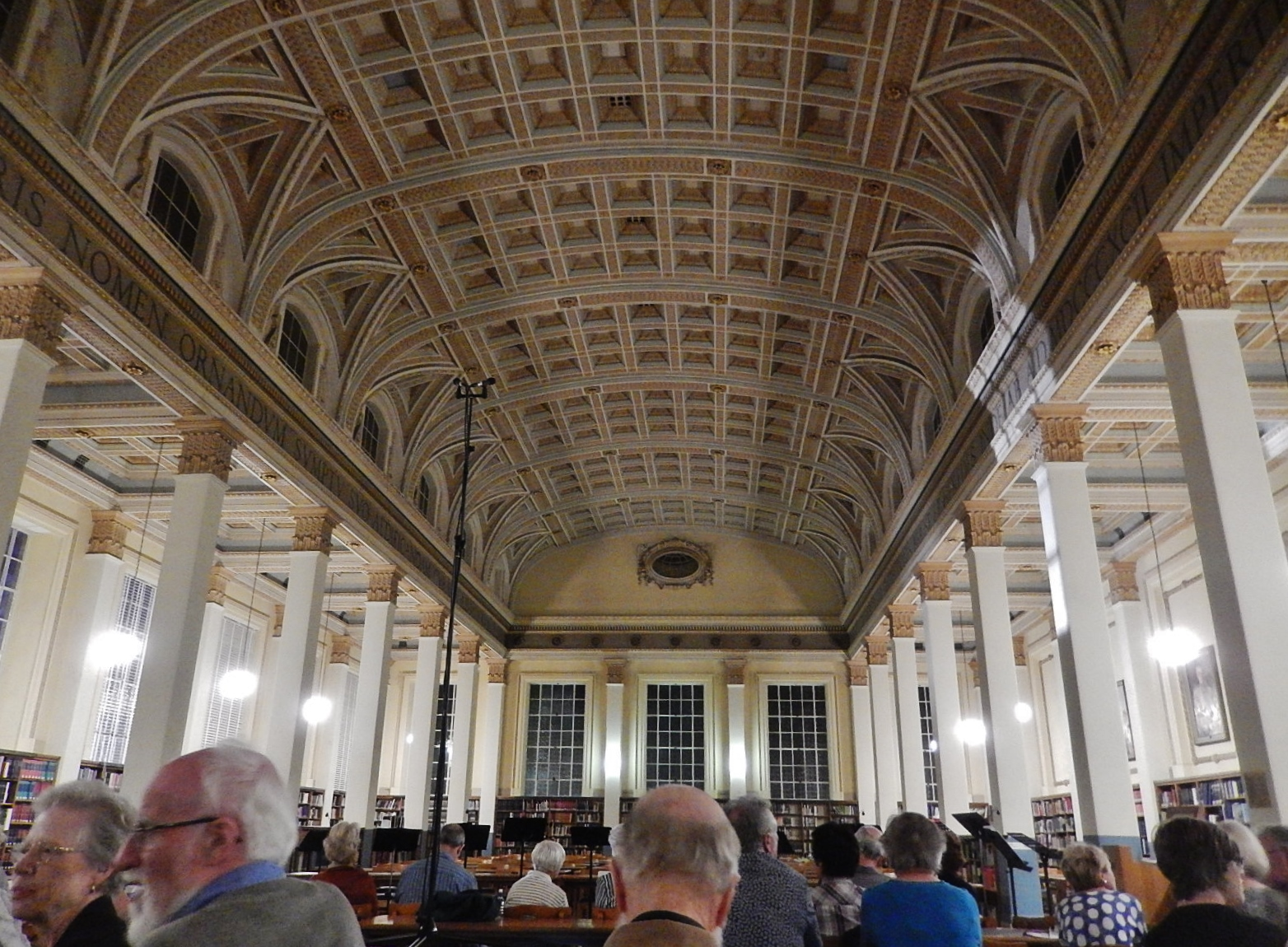
Barr Smith Library ceiling

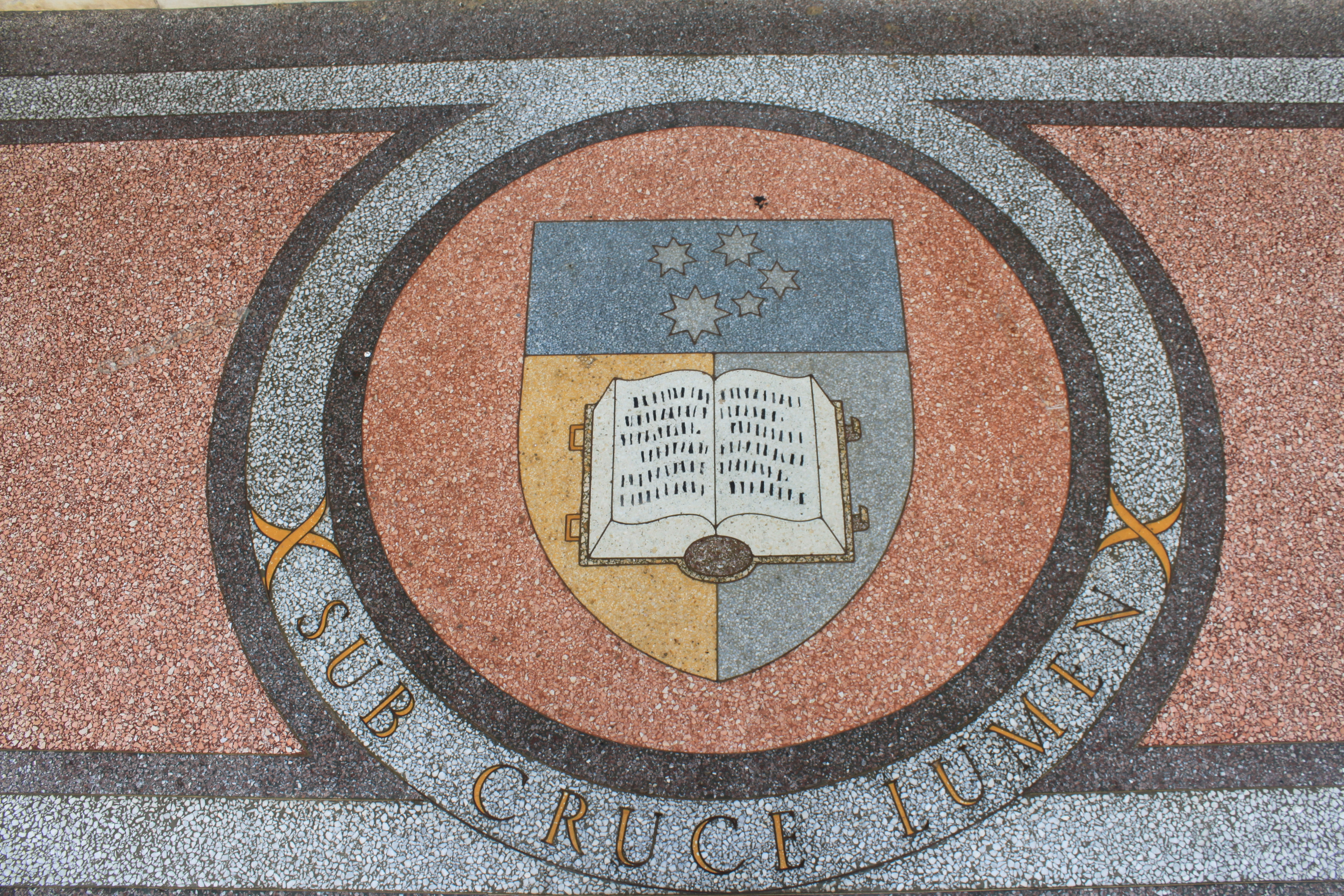
University shield near library

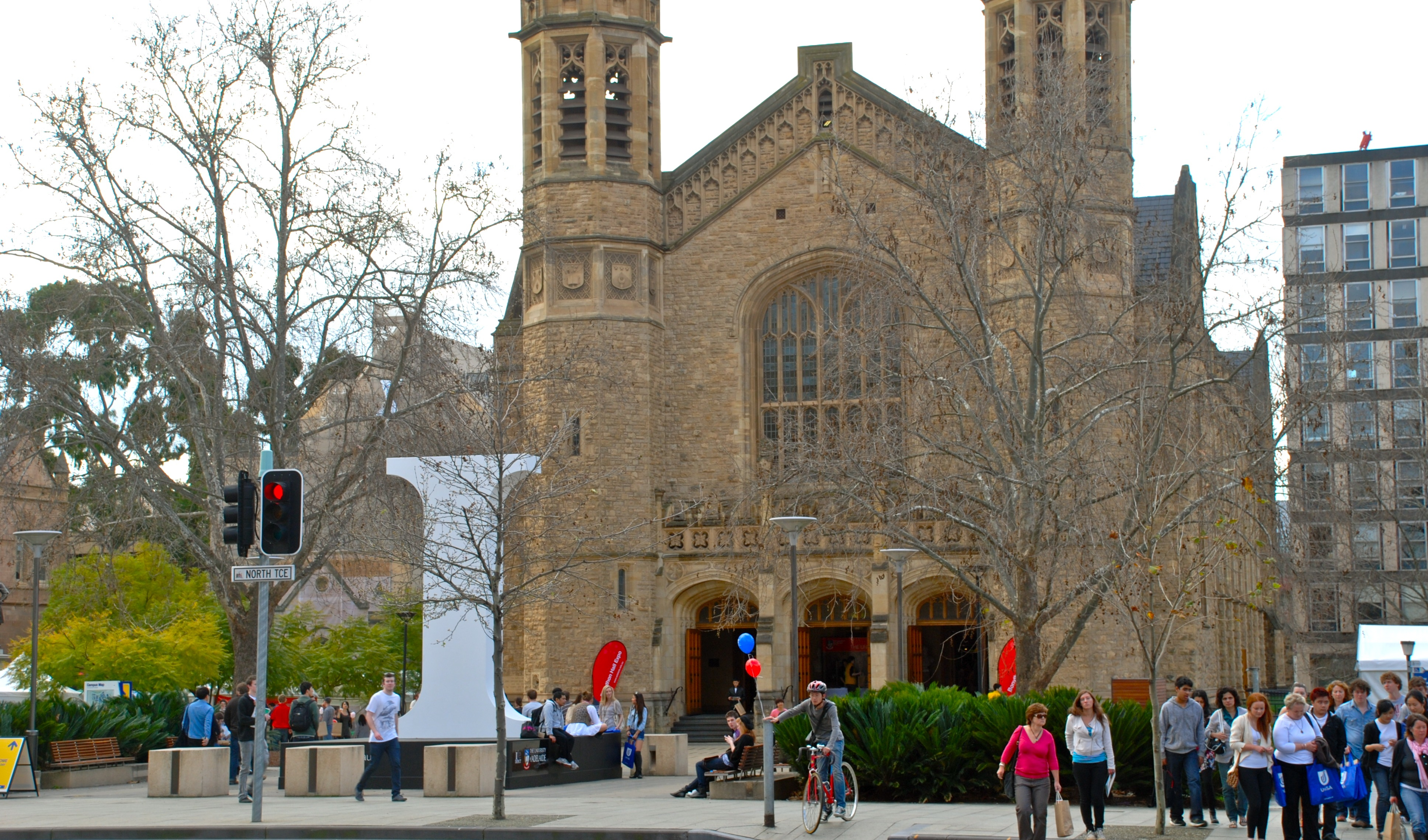
Bonython Hall during winter

== Tram stop ==
The university is served by two stops on the Glenelg tram line, University and City West, which connects the main campus on the east with the Adelaide Health and Medical Sciences Building on the west end of North Terrace.

Preceding station	Adelaide Metro	Following station
Art Gallery towards Adelaide Entertainment Centre	Glenelg tram line	Botanic Gardens Terminus

== See also ==
- List of universities in Australia
- University of Adelaide College - a private pre-university pathways college
- Elder Conservatorium of Music
- Roseworthy Agricultural College
- Education in Australia
- Barr Smith Library
- On Dit

== Sources ==
- Sumerling, Patricia; McDougall, Katrina (August 2006). "The City of Adelaide: A Thematic History". McDougall & Vines. Adelaide, South Australia. Archived from the original on 16 December 2019.
- Hodder, Edwin (July 2013). The History of South Australia Volume II. Adelaide, South Australia: Sampson Low, Marston & Company. ISBN 9781334291111. Archived from the original on 28 April 2024.
- Edgeloe, Victor Allen (1983). "The Adelaide Law School 1883-1983" (PDF). Adelaide Law Review. Adelaide, South Australia: The University of Adelaide. Archived (PDF) from the original on 5 June 2024.
- Harvey, Nick; Fornasiero, Jean; McCarthy, Greg; Macintyre, Clem; Crossin, Carl, eds. (2012). A History of the Faculty of Arts at the University of Adelaide 1876-2012 (PDF). Adelaide, South Australia: University of Adelaide Press. Archived (PDF) from the original on 14 February 2024.
- Zeitz, Lynette D. (2014). The Waite: A Social and Scientific History of the Waite Agricultural Research Institute. Adelaide, South Australia: Barr Smith Press. doi:10.20851/waite. ISBN 9781922064615. ISSN 0312-9640. Archived from the original on 16 July 2024.
- Gardner, J.A.; Delaporte, K.L. (24 March 2023). "Waite Arboretum – An enduring gift" (PDF). Enviro Data SA (Government of South Australia). Adelaide, South Australia: Board of the Botanic Gardens & State Herbarium. Archived (PDF) from the original on 29 May 2024.
- Gardner, Jennifer A. "The Waite Arboretum – Science, Trees and Technology" (PDF). Australian Forest History Society. Archived (PDF) from the original on 16 March 2024.
- Burn, Margy (1982). The Barr Smith Library: its early days. Adelaide, South Australia: The University of Adelaide Library. ISBN 978-0-909766-04-7. Archived from the original on 21 November 2023.
- Gosse, Fayette (1996). Joanna and Robert: the Barr Smiths' life in letters, 1853-1919. Adelaide, South Australia: Barr Smith Press. Archived from the original on 22 July 2024.
- Emery, Margaret (November 1990). "Roseworthy Agricultural College and its Library 1883 – 1990" (PDF). Roseworthy Agricultural College. Roseworthy, South Australia. Archived (PDF) from the original on 21 May 2024.
- "The University of Adelaide - 150 Years of Making History". The University of Adelaide. Adelaide, South Australia. Archived from the original on 19 August 2024.
- Hoskin, Cheryl (May 2013). "A Genius About the Place: The Phoenix Magazine and Australian modernism" (PDF). The University of Adelaide. Adelaide, South Australia. Archived (PDF) from the original on 30 May 2023.
