= List of University of South Australia people =

This is an incomplete list of University of South Australia people including notable alumni and staff associated with the former University of South Australia in Australia.

== Alumni ==
=== Arts ===
- Lainie Anderson, author
- Andrew Baines, artist
- Beverley Bolin, architect
- David Caon, industrial designer
- Angelica Cheung Editor-in-chief, Vogue China
- David Cornish, author
- Ari Gibson, artist, animator, and game designer
- Barbara Hanrahan, artist, printmaker and writer
- Peter Serwan, artist
- Jeffrey Smart AO, artist, studied at the South Australian School of Art and Crafts circa 1940
- Poh Ling Yeow, artist, celebrity chef, television presenter

=== Business ===
- Essington Lewis, chairman, BHP
- Dr Nalaka Godahewa, chairman, Securities & Exchange Commission of Sri Lanka

=== Journalism and media ===
- Kate Collins, Nine News presenter
- Sarah Cumming, former Seven News presenter and reporter
- Will McDonald, Nine News reporter
- Georgina McGuinness, former weekend anchor and reporter for National Nine News. (Alumna of SACAE, Magill campus, graduated 1987)
- Rebecca Morse, Ten News presenter, former ABC reporter and presenter, and South Australian Media Awards Journalist of the Year in 2005
- Indira Naidoo, consumer rights advocate and former television news presenter (ABC and SBS). (Alumna of SACAE)
- Sally Sara AM, ABC TV journalist and correspondent

=== Sports ===
- Eleni Glouftsis OAM, Australian rules football field umpire in the Australian Football League (AFL)
- John Gloster, physiotherapist for the Indian Cricket Team
- Nathan Konstandopoulos, footballer
- Isabella Rositano, multi-sport athlete
- Rachael Sporn OAM, Olympic basketballer Atlanta 1996, Sydney 2000, Athens 2004
- Darryl Wakelin, AFL footballer
- Jenny Williams, multi-sport athlete

=== Politics ===
- Dean Brown AO former premier of South Australia
- Robert Lau Hoi Chew (1942–2010), Malaysian member of parliament, and Deputy Minister of Transportation of Malaysia
- Lina Chiam, Non-Constituency Member of Parliament, Singapore
- Nick Champion, ALP member of the South Australian House of Assembly representing the Electoral district of Taylor since 2022
- Bob Day, former Family First Senator for South Australia
- Glenn Docherty, Mayor of the City of Playford
- Trish Draper, former Liberal member of the Australian House of Representatives, representing the Division of Makin
- Iain Evans, former Leader of the Liberal Party in South Australia and former Leader of the Opposition in the South Australian parliament (Alumnus of SAIT)
- Tom Kenyon, ALP Former member of the Parliament of South Australia representing the Electoral district of Newland
- Michelle Lensink MLC, Deputy Leader of Liberal in the South Australian Legislative Council
- Steven Marshall, former Premier of South Australia, former Leader of the Liberal Party in South Australia, and member representing the Electoral district of Dunstan
- Tony Messner, former Liberal Senator for South Australia and federal Minister for Veterans Affairs
- Mark Parnell, former SA Greens member of the Parliament of South Australia
- Christopher Pyne, former Liberal member of the Australian House of Representatives, representing the Division of Sturt, and former Minister for Defence
- Trish White, former ALP member of the Parliament of South Australia representing the Electoral district of Taylor from 1994 to 2010
- Dana Wortley, ALP member of the Australian Senate
- Penny Wong, Leader of the Government in the Senate and Minister for Foreign Affairs

== Honorary alumni ==
=== Doctor of the University ===
The university awards the Honorary Doctorate to recognise an individual who has achieved eminence in an area of education or research, or is distinguished by eminent service to the community.

The honorary doctorate is not a recognised qualification and as such the title 'Doctor' is not used by recipients, but the Post-nominal letters "DUniv" is granted.

Recipients

Year	Name	Citation
2019	Terry Evans	
2019	Adam Goodes	
2019	Jim McDowell	
2019	The Honourable Dr Brendan Nelson, AO	
2018	Deborah Cheetham, AO	
2018	The Honourable Greg Combet, AM	
2018	Peter Gago, AC	
2018	Eric Idle	
2018	William Muirhead, AM	
2018	Adjunct Associate Professor Monica Oliphant, AO	
2017	Emeritus Professor MaryAnn Bin-Sallik, AO	
2017	The Honourable Julia Gillard, AC	
2017	Dr Ian Gould, AM	
2017	Janet Holmes à Court, AC	
2017	Air Chief Marshal Sir Angus Houston, AK, AC (Mil), AFC	
2017	Thomas Keneally, AO	
2017	The Honourable John Mansfield, AM, QC	
2017	Kevin O'Loughlin, OAM	
2017	Curtis Wong	
2016	Mr Jack Manning Bancroft	
2016	Professor Gary Banks, AO	
2016	Ms Maggie Beer, AM	
2016	Mrs Marie Coleman, AO	
2016	Ms Evonne Goolagong Cawley, AC, MBE	
2016	Professor Lord Anthony Giddens	
2016	Mr John Barry Humphries, AO, CBE	
2015	Professor Gerald Goodhardt	
2015	Professor Robyn Williams, AM	
2014	Dr Wolf Blass, AM	
2014	Major General Charles Bolden Jr.	
2014	The Honourable Quentin Bryce, AD, CVO	
2014	Professor Brian Burdekin, AO	
2014	Mr Vinton G Cerf	
2014	Mr Peter Gabriel	
2014	Dr Jane Goodall, DBE	
2014	Professor Peter Høj, AC	
2014	Professor Mary McAleese	
2014	Sir Terence Pratchett, OBE	
2014	Dr Anne Summers, AO	
2013	Mr Sydney Ball	
2013	The Honourable Alexander Downer, AC	
2013	Mr Michael Heard	
2013	The Honourable Robyn Layton, AO, QC	
2012	Ms Fiona Hall, AO	
2011	Emeritus Professor Maxwell Brennan, AO	
2011	Ms Alice McCleary	
2011	Professor Ashis Nandy	
2011	Mr Jeffrey Smart, AO	
2010	Adjunct Professor Neil Bryans	
2010	Professor Brian Vincent	
2009	Mr Martin Albrecht, AC	
2009	Mr David Klingberg, AO	
2009	Professor Jarl Rosenholm	
2008	Mr Milton Moon, AM	
2008	Dr Pamela Ryan, OAM	
2007	Emeritus Professor Denise Bradley, AC	
2007	Professor Don Bursill, AM	
2007	Dr Ron Radford, AM	
2007	Professor Leanna Read	
2006	Mr Norton Jackson, AM	
2006	Mr Mike Rann, AC	
2006	Honourable Susan Ryan, AO	
2005	Professor Frank Bass	
2005	Dr Julian Burnside, QC	
2005	Mr Leon Davis, AO	
2005	Professor Andrew Ehrenberg	
2005	Professor R Natarajan	
2005	Dr Gregor Ramsey, AM	
2005	Dr Simon Wong	
2004	Mr Phillip Adams, AO	
2004	Mr Stephen Page, AM	
2003	Mr Maurice de Rohan, AO, OBE	
2003	Dr Alfred Huang, AM	
2003	Dr Yuan Tseh Lee	
2003	Professor Zhang Xiaowei	
2002	Ms Dagmar Egen, AM	
2002	Professor Eleanor Ramsay	
2001	The Honourable Justice Michael Kirby, AC, CMG	
2000	Mr Rick Allert, AO	
2000	Mr Kym Bonython, AC	
2000	Adjunct Professor Lyndsay Connors, AM	
2000	Dr Patricia Crook, AO	
2000	Dr Malcolm Kinnaird, AC	
1999	The Honourable Dr Basil Hetzel, AC	
1999	Dr Colin Thiele, AC	
1999	Professor Lyndall Ryan	
1998	Dr Julian Clark	
1998	Honourable Robert J. L. Hawke, AC	
1998	Mr Nelson Mandela	
1998	Dr Alice Rigney, AO	
1998	Ms Ruth Tuck, AO	
1998	Mr Bruce Webb	
1998	Dr Don Williams, AO	
1997	Honourable Justice Samuel Jacobs, AO	
1997	Mr John Kundereri Moriarty, AM	
1997	Dr S (Max) Richards	
1997	Mr Daniel Thomas, AM	
1997	Ms Sue Vardon, AO	
1996	Mr Archie Barton, AM	
1996	Dr Betty Davis, AM	
1996	Honourable Dr John Dawkins, AO	
1996	Ms Wendy McCarthy, AO	
1996	Sir Eric Neal, AC, CVO	
1996	Honourable Justice John Von Doussa, AO, QC	
1995	Ms Doreen Kartinyeri	
1995	Dr Christobel Mattingley, AM	
1995	Dr David Pank, AM	
1995	Dr James CY Soong	
1994	Ms Anne Deveson, AO	
1994	Dame Roma Mitchell, AC, DBE	
1994	Mr John Uhrig, AC	
1994	Mr Gavin Walkley, AM	
1993	Dr Jean Edna Blackburn, AO	
1993	Ms Alison Crook, AO	
1993	Dr James May	
1993	Mr John McDonald, AM	
1993	Professor Lowitja O’Donoghue, AC, CBE, DSJ	

== Administration (1991–2026) ==
=== Chancellors ===
No.	Chancellor	Commenced	Concluded	Ref.
1	John McDonald (aka MacDonald)	1991	1992	
2	Basil Hetzel	1992	1998	
3	David Klingberg	1998	2008	
4	Ian Gould	2008	2015	
5	Jim McDowell	2016	2018	
6	Pauline Carr	2018	2024	
7	John Hill	2024	2026	

=== Vice-Chancellors ===
No.	Vice-Chancellor	Commenced	Concluded	Ref.
1	Alan Mead	1991	1992	
2	David A. Robinson	1992	1997	
3	Denise Bradley	1997	2007	
4	Peter Høj	2007	2012	
n/a	Marnie Hughes-Warrington (as Standing Acting Vice-Chancellor)	2023	2025	
5	David Lloyd	2013	2026	

=== Interim vice-chancellors (1998–2026) ===
Acting Vice-Chancellors:

- Michael Rowan (1999, 2005)
- Kevin O'Brien (2003–2004)
- Hilary Patience Winchester (2004, 2007)
- Joanne Wright (2012; 2012–2013)
- Allan Mark Evans (2013, 2018, 2020, 2021)
- Simon Charles Beecham (2020)
- Distinguished Professor Marnie Hughes-Warrington (2022, 2025)
- Joanne Cys (2022, 2024)

=== Deputy Chancellors ===
No.	Deputy Chancellor	Commenced	Concluded	Ref.
1	Dr Virginia C. Kenny (aka Kennedy)	1991	1992	
2	Dagmar Egen	1992	2002	
3	Alice McCleary	2002	2009	
4	Wendy Craik	2009	2018	
5	John Hill	2018	2024	
6	Michael L. Abbott	2024	2026	

== Faculty ==
- Clare Belfrage, lecturer in Glass Studies at the South Australian School of Art from 1996; as of 2025 adjunct professor, UniSA Creative (incorporating the School of Art)
