= List of Australian university leaders =

Since the development of the university sector in Australia and the foundation of the first university (University of Sydney, 1850), a small number of Vice-Chancellors have served for 15 years or more with some portion of this time in office as Vice-Chancellor in Australia. They include:

29 years: Sir Anthony Brownless KCMG KSG (Melbourne 1858–87);

26 years: Sir William Mitchell (philosopher) KCMG (Adelaide 1916–42);

21 years: John Douglas Story (Queensland 1938–59);

20 years: Sir Stephen Henry Roberts CMG (Sydney 1947–67), James McWha AO (Lincoln 2018, Rwanda 2013–15, Adelaide 2002–12, Massey 1996–2001);

19 years: William Barlow (vice-chancellor) CMG (Adelaide 1896–1915); Sir Robert Strachan Wallace KCMG (Sydney 1928–47); Dianne Yerbury AO (Macquarie 1987–2006); Alan Gilbert (Australian academic) AO (Manchester 2004–10, Melbourne 1996–2004, Tasmania 1991–96); Paul Wellings CBE (Wollongong 2012–21, Lancaster 2002–2012); Margaret Gardner AC (Monash 2014–23, RMIT 2005–14);

18 years: Sir Raymond Priestley (Birmingham 1938–52, Melbourne 1934–38); Sir Stanley Prescott OBE (Western Australia (1953–70); Peter Høj AC (Adelaide University 2024–2026, UofA 2021–2026, Queensland 2012–2020, UniSA 2007–2012).

17 years: Sir George Currie (academic) (UNZ 1952–62, Western Australia 1945–52); Michael Birt (biochemist) AO CBE (UNSW 1981–92, Wollongong 1975–80); Brian Wilson AO (Queensland 1979–96); Roy Webb AO (Griffith 1985–2002); Glyn Davis AC (Melbourne 2005–18, Griffith 2002–05);

16 years: Sir Philip Baxter KBE CMG (UNSW 1953–69); Sir Louis Matheson KBE CMG (Monash 1960–76); Alec Lazenby AO (Tasmania 1982–91, UNE 1970–77); Ian Chubb AC (ANU 2001–11, Flinders 1995–2000); Gerard Sutton AO (Wollongong 1995–2011).

15 years: Ken McKinnon AO (Charles Darwin 2002–03, JCU 1997, Wollongong 1981–94); Dennis Gibson (academic) AO (QUT 1988–2003); Michael Osborne (La Trobe 1990–2005); John Hay (academic) AC (Queensland 1996–2007, Deakin 1992–95); Steven Schwartz (psychologist) AM (Macquarie 2006–11, Brunel 2002–2006, Murdoch 1996–2002); Janice Reid AC (Western Sydney 1998–2013); Peter Coaldrake AO (QUT 2003–17); Ian O'Connor AC (Griffith 2005–19), Sandra Harding (sociologist) AO (JCU 2007–2021), Michael Spence AC (UCL 2021–present, Sydney 2008–20).

Spence is still in office (as at May 2026).

The current Chancellors and Vice-Chancellors/Presidents are given as at April 2025 (or as at May 2026 for the SA-based universities):

University	Chancellor	Vice-Chancellor/President
Adelaide University	Pauline Carr	Nicola Phillips
Australian Catholic University	Martin Daubney, AM	Zlatko Skrbis
Australian National University	Gordon de Brouwer, AO, PSM	Rebekah Brown (interim)
Australian University of Theology	David Hurley	James Dalziel
Avondale University	Glenn Townend	Malcolm Coulson
Bond University	David Baxby	Tim Brailsford
Central Queensland University	Graeme Innes AM	Nick Klomp
Charles Darwin University	Paul Henderson, AO	Scott Bowman, AO
Charles Sturt University	Michele Allan	Renée Leon, PSM
Curtin University	Vanessa Guthrie, AO	Harlene Hayne
Deakin University	John Stanhope, AM	Iain Martin
Edith Cowan University	Gaye McMath	Clare Pollock
Federation University	Terry Moran AC	Duncan Bentley
Flinders University	John Hood	Colin J Stirling
Griffith University	Andrew Fraser	Carolyn Evans
James Cook University	Ngaire Brown	Simon Biggs
La Trobe University	John Brumby, AO	Theo Farrell
Macquarie University	Martin Parkinson AC PSM	S Bruce Dowton
Monash University	Megan Clark, AO FTSE	Sharon Pickering
Murdoch University	Gail McGowan PSM	Andrew Deeks
Queensland University of Technology	Ann Sherry, AO	Margaret Sheil, AO
RMIT University	Peggy O'Neal, AO	Alec Cameron
Southern Cross University	Sandra McPhee, AM	Tyrone Carlin
Swinburne University of Technology	John Pollaers, OAM	Pascale Quester
Torrens University Australia	Michael Thawley, AO	Alwyn Louw (Vice Chancellor), Dan Cockerell (President)
~~University of Adelaide~~ (defunct)	~~Catherine Branson~~ (2020–2026)	~~Peter Høj, AC~~ (2021–2026)
University of Canberra	Lisa Paul, AO PSM	Bill Shorten
University of Divinity	Graeme Blackman, AO	James McLaren
University of Melbourne	Jane Hansen AO	Glyn Davis AC (interim)
University of New England	Sarah Pearson	Chris Moran
University of New South Wales	David Gonski, AC	Attila Brungs
University of Newcastle	The Hon. Patricia Forsythe AM	Alex Zelinsky AO, FTSE
University of Notre Dame Australia	The Hon. Chris Ellison	Francis Campbell
University of Queensland	Peter N Varghese, AO	Deborah Terry AO
~~University of South Australia~~ (defunct)	~~The Hon. John Hill~~ (2024–2026)	~~David Lloyd~~ (2013–2026)
University of Southern Queensland	John McVeigh	Karen Nelson (acting)
University of Sydney	David Thodey, AO FTSE	Mark Scott, AO
University of the Sunshine Coast	Sir Angus Houston, AK, AC (Mil), AFC	Helen Bartlett
University of Tasmania	Alison Watkins AM	Rufus Black
University of Technology Sydney	Michael Rose	Andrew Parfitt
University of Western Australia	Robert French, AC	Amit Chakma
University of Wollongong	Michael Still	Eileen McLaughlin (Interim) Max Lu (from May 2025)
Victoria University	Steve Bracks AC	Adam Shoemaker
Western Sydney University	Jennifer Westacott AO	George Williams AO FASSA

== See also ==
- Lists of university leaders
