= Marnie Hughes-Warrington =

Australian historian

Distinguished Professor Marnie Hughes-Warrington AO
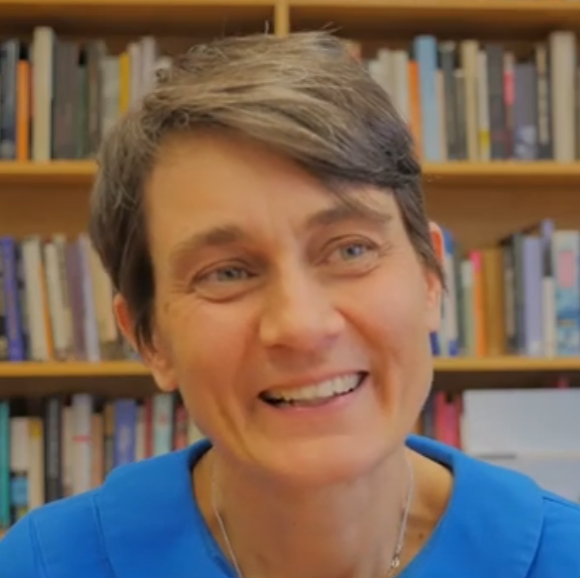
- In a 2021 interview

Standing Acting Vice-Chancellor of the University of South Australia
- In office 2023–2025
- Chancellor: Pauline Carr; John Hill
- Preceded by: David Lloyd
- Succeeded by: David Lloyd

Acting Vice-Chancellor and President of the University of South Australia
- In office 2022 – 2025 (intermittent)
- Preceded by: David Lloyd
- Succeeded by: Joanne Cys (acting); David Lloyd

Personal details
- Born: Victoria, Australia
- Education: University of Tasmania; Merton College, Oxford
- Occupation: Academic
- Awards: Officer of the Order of Australia (2022)

D.Prof Marnie Hughes-Warrington AO is an Australian academic who currently serves as professor of history at the University of South Australia (UniSA), where she has also served since 2020 as Deputy Vice-Chancellor (Research and Enterprise). She previously worked at the Australian National University. Her areas of expertise are the philosophy of history, historiography, and world history.

Hughes-Warrington served as UniSA's Standing Acting Vice-Chancellor from 2023–2025. Additionally, she was thrice appointed as acting Vice-Chancellor and President of UniSA in David Lloyd's absence.

== Early life and education ==
Hughes-Warrington was born in Victoria and grew up in Tasmania. She studied Philosophy and History at the University of Tasmania from 1988 to 1991, and graduated with a Bachelor of Education with First Class Honours with majors in history and philosophy in 1992.

She was chosen as a Rhodes Scholar in 1992, and completed her DPhil at Merton College, Oxford, where she served as President of the Middle Common Room. Her thesis, completed in 1995, is entitled Historical imagination and education, and focuses on the philosophy of history and education of R. G. Collingwood.

== Career ==
After completing her DPhil, Hughes-Warrington lectured in history at the University of Oxford, the University of Washington and Macquarie University. She became Associate Dean of Education at Macquarie in 1998, and held the position until 2009. She has also taught at Leipzig University and Harvard University.

From 2009 to 2012, she worked as Pro-Vice Chancellor (Learning and Teaching) at Monash University, and became Deputy Vice-Chancellor (Academic) at the Australian National University in 2012. In 2018 she announced her intention to go back to her twin loves of history and philosophy to work on three new books. Her current writing project focuses on the relationship between the scales of histories and ethics. She is the fifth secretary of the Rhodes Scholarships in Australia. She is also a member of the International Commission for the History and Theory of Historiography (ICHTH), currently serving as its Secretary-General (2022–2026).

== Published works ==
Hughes-Warrington is the author of eight books:

- Fifty Key Thinkers on History Brazilian Portuguese, Turkish and Bahasa translations (London: Routledge, 2000, 2009, 2014)
- How Good an Historian Shall I Be?: R. G. Collingwood, the Historical Imagination and Education (Thorverton: Imprint Academic, 2003)
- Palgrave Advances in World Histories (Basingstoke: Palgrave 2005)
- History Goes to the Movies: Studying History on Film (London: Routledge, 2007)
- The History on Film Reader (Abingdon: Routledge, 2009)
- Revisionist Histories (Abingdon: Routledge, 2013)
- History as Wonder: Beginning with Historiography (Abingdon: Routledge, 2018)
- Big and Little Histories: Sizing up Ethics in Historiography. With Anne Martin. (Abingdon: Routledge, 2021)

== Awards ==
- 2008: Australian Prime Minister's Award for University Teacher of the Year
- 2008: Teaching Excellence Award in Humanities and the Arts, Australian Learning and Teaching Council
- 2013: University of Tasmania Foundation Graduate of the Year Award
- 2022: Appointed Officer of the Order of Australia in the 2022 Queen's Birthday Honours for "distinguished service to tertiary education and governance as an administrator, leader and mentor".
