= Wendy Craik =

Australian scientist and public policy adviser

Wendy Craik AM FTSE

4th Deputy Chancellor of the University of South Australia
- In office 2009–2018
- Chancellor: Ian Gould; Jim McDowell; Pauline Carr
- Preceded by: Alice McCleary
- Succeeded by: John Hill

Personal details
- Born: Gwenneth Jean Steele Craik; 1949 (age 76–77) Canberra, Australian Capital Territory
- Education: Australian National University
- Alma mater: University of British Columbia
- Organization(s): Climate Change Authority; Reserve Bank of Australia

Academic background
- Thesis: A further investigation of the homing behaviour of the intertidal cottid, Oligocottus maculosus Girard (1978)

Academic work
- Institutions: Great Barrier Reef Marine Park Authority; National Farmers' Federation; Murray–Darling Basin Commission

Wendy Craik (born 1949) is an Australian scientist, public policy adviser and company director. She served as Deputy Chancellor of the University of South Australia.

== Early life and education ==
Gwenneth Jean Steele Craik was born in 1949 in Canberra, the second of four daughters of commerce graduate, Audrey Mavis (née Ion) and Duncan Robert Steele Craik, who later was Commonwealth Auditor-General. She was educated at Telopea Park High School, winning a Commonwealth scholarship in November 1965 for her final two years. She graduated from the Australian National University in 1973 with a BA (Hons) and the University Medal for Zoology. She then won a CSIRO scholarship and went to Vancouver, Canada where she completed a PhD in Zoology at the University of British Columbia with her thesis, "A further investigation of the homing behaviour of the intertidal cottid, Oligocottus maculosus Girard".

== Career ==
After her PhD, Craik returned to Canberra and joined the Department of the Environment and was sent to the Great Barrier Reef Marine Park Authority (GBRMPA) as part of her public service traineeship. She transferred to work in Townsville for the GBRMPA in 1978, where she initially did a lot of field work. During her time with the Authority she saw its staff grow from ten to 150 and in 1992 she became its executive officer.

In 1995 she changed career direction, left Queensland and was appointed executive director of the National Farmers' Federation (NFF), replacing Rick Farley in the role. Although her focus was on running the NFF and managing the conflicting demands of its member organisations, she retained her link to marine and water science when she served on the Council of the Australian Institute of Marine Science and as chair of the CSIRO Land and Water Sector Advisory Committee from 1997 to 2000. She was also a member of the University of Melbourne's Institute of Land and Food Resources and, from 1997 to 1999, a member of the Australian Landcare Council.

In 2000 she left the NFF to lead Earth Sanctuaries Limited in Adelaide and also became chair of the Australian Fisheries Management Authority the same year and given a second three-year term in 2003. She returned to Canberra in 2002 to join ACIL Tasman (now ACIL Allen) as chief operating officer. She was a member of the National Competition Council and its president in 2003. She was appointed CEO of the Murray Darling Basin Commission (now Murray–Darling Basin Authority) in 2004 for four years.

Craik joined the board of the Climate Change Authority in 2015 and served as chair from 2016 to 2020. She was appointed to the board of the Reserve Bank of Australia in 2018 for a five-year term.

== Awards and honours ==
Craik was elected a Fellow of the Australian Academy of Technology and Engineering in 1996.

Craik was awarded the Centenary Medal in January 2001 for her "contribution to industry development and social issues impacting on rural industries". She was appointed a Member of the Order of Australia in the 2007 Australia Day Honours for "service to the natural resource sector of the economy, particularly in the areas of fisheries, marine ecology and management of water reform, and for contributions to policies affecting rural and regional Australia".

She was awarded an honorary doctorate by the University of Canberra in 2009.
