= David Lloyd (chemist) =

Irish-Australian academic (born 1974)

David Lloyd FRSC FTSE
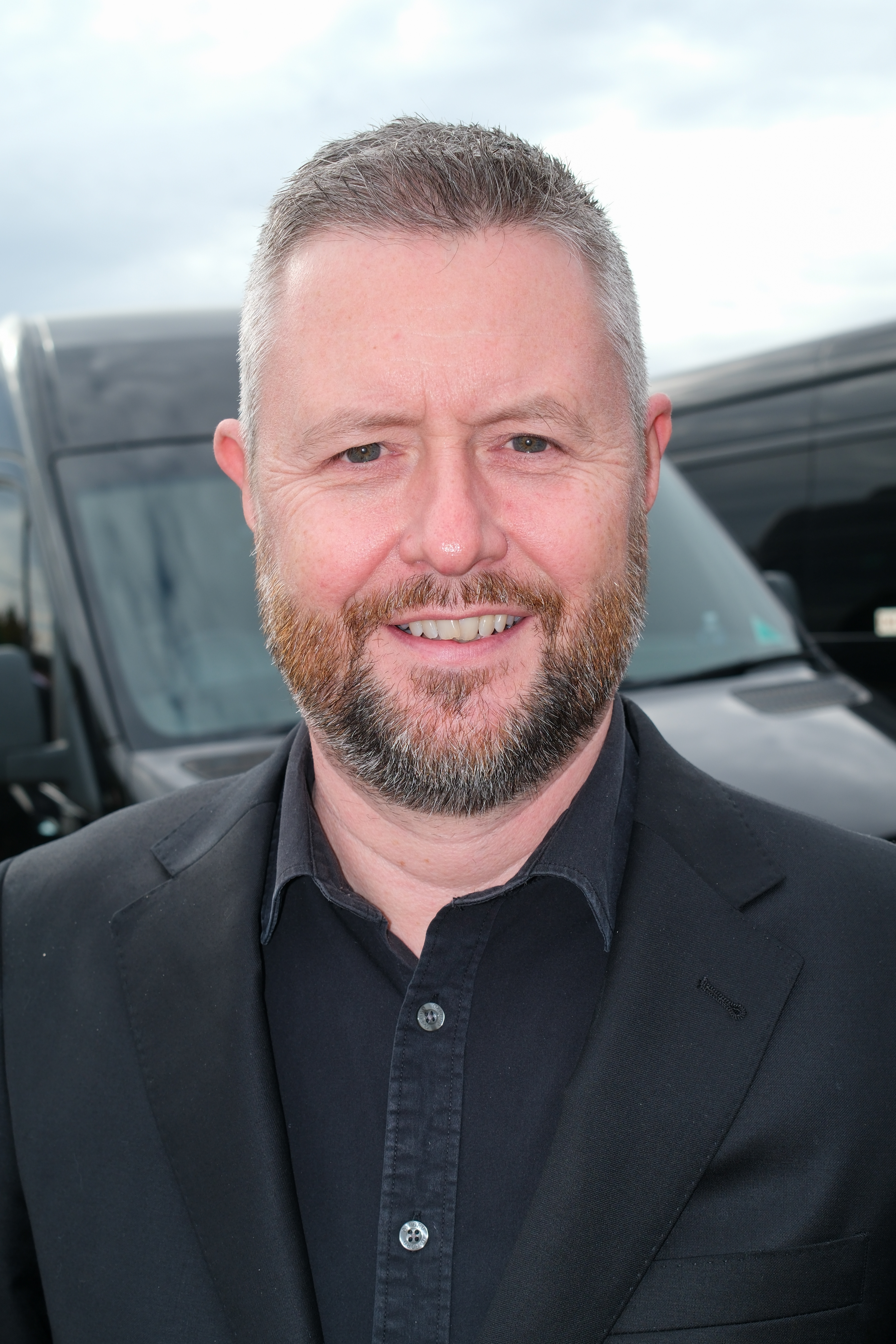
- Lloyd in 2026

Founding Vice-Chancellor of Adelaide University (Note: Even though Høj and Lloyd was appointed as the founding co-Vice Chancellor of Adelaide University, their successor Phillips became the first Vice Chancellor and President of the institution.)
- In office 8 March 2024 – 12 January 2026 Serving with Peter Høj
- Chancellor: Pauline Carr
- Preceded by: Position established
- Succeeded by: Nicola Phillips

5th Vice-Chancellor and President of the University of South Australia
- In office 21 January 2013 – February 2026
- Chancellor: Ian Gould; Jim McDowell; Pauline Carr; John Hill
- Preceded by: Peter Høj
- Succeeded by: Position abolished

Personal details
- Born: David George Lloyd; 25 April 1974 (age 52) Dublin, Ireland
- Spouse: Annie Timlin (m. 2001 d. 2017) Penny Lloyd (m. 2025)
- Education: Dublin City University (BSc; PhD); Trinity College Dublin (MA)

David George Lloyd (born 25 April 1974) is an Irish–Australian chemist and university administrator. He became the youngest vice-chancellor in Australia when he was appointed in 2013, at the age of 38.

Born in Dublin, Ireland, Lloyd studied applied chemistry at Dublin City University and completed a Doctor of Philosophy in medicinal organic chemistry, followed by a Master of Arts from Trinity College Dublin. After postdoctoral research and work in the pharmaceutical industry, he joined De Novo Pharmaceuticals in Cambridge in 2001 and returned to Trinity College Dublin in 2004, where he held several academic and administrative positions, including Dean and Vice President of Research from 2007 to 2011. In 2012, he became chair of the Irish Research Council and was involved in national science and innovation policy.

Lloyd was appointed Vice Chancellor and President of the University of South Australia (UniSA) on 22 August 2012, and commenced in early 2013. At 38, he became Australia's youngest vice-chancellor. During his tenure, he oversaw UniSA's strategic and capital development programs, including the development of Pridham Hall and the Health Innovation Building, and established partnerships with industry and universities in Australia and overseas. He also served on the boards of the South Australian Health and Medical Research Institute and the state's Economic Development Board, and was appointed to the Australian Research Council Advisory Council in 2018. In 2018, Lloyd initiated discussions with the University of Adelaide (UofA) about a possible merger, although the negotiations ended without agreement later that year.

In 2022, Lloyd and Peter Høj proposed merging UniSA with UofA to establish Adelaide University (AU). The merger was approved in 2023 and AU was established on 8 March 2024, with Lloyd and Høj serving as co-vice chancellors during the transition. Lloyd was also chair of Universities Australia from 2023 to 2025. In that same year, he and Høj announced that they would not seek appointment as AU's inaugural substantive vice-chancellor, and Nicola Phillips commenced in the role in early 2026. Lloyd concluded the operations of UniSA at the end of March 2026 and left university management of the merger, establishing BlueRange Advisory. In September 2026 Lloyd was announced as the Interim Vice Chancellor of the University of Notre Dame Australia.

== Early life and education ==
David George Lloyd was born on 25 April 1974 in Dublin, Ireland, and became the first member of his family to attend university. He studied applied chemistry at Dublin City University, where he graduated with a Bachelor of Science (Honours) and later completed a Doctor of Philosophy in medicinal organic chemistry, researching antimalarial compounds. During his undergraduate studies, he worked part-time at Waltons music store in Dublin and undertook an internship with the Irish division of the Dutch pharmaceutical company Organon, where he worked in quality assurance. He subsequently obtained a Master of Arts from Trinity College Dublin.

== Academic career ==
Following his doctoral studies, Lloyd undertook postdoctoral research at Trinity College Dublin, where his research focused on molecular modelling and computer-aided drug design. He subsequently worked in the pharmaceutical industry in the United Kingdom and, in 2001, joined Cambridge-based start-up De Novo Pharmaceuticals as a senior scientist. He returned to Trinity College Dublin in 2004 as a senior lecturer and was appointed Associate Dean of Research in 2005. He later became head of the Molecular Design Group and served as Dean and Vice President of Research from 2007 to 2011, before becoming Bursar and Director of Strategic Innovation. In these roles, he was involved in Trinity's research and development strategy, including funding for the Trinity Biomedical Sciences Institute, and served on the National Advisory Council for Science, Technology and Innovation and a subgroup of the Taoiseach's Innovation Task Force. In March 2012, he became chair of the Irish Research Council, having previously served as its first chair. Lloyd supported the Innovation Alliance and the establishment of a national innovation task force in Ireland during the post-2008 economic downturn.

== University career ==
=== University of South Australia (2013–2022/2026) ===
On 22 August 2012, Lloyd was appointed Vice Chancellor and President of the University of South Australia (UniSA), commencing in early 2013 and succeeding Peter Høj. He relocated to Adelaide in 2013 and, at 38, became Australia's youngest vice-chancellor. In February, he identified student–teacher ratios and the student experience as areas of focus and directed a research collaboration with Tianjin University on sustainable urban development, with A$1 million in funding provided by each university. In May, he confirmed that UniSA was developing plans for a major presence on North Terrace near the new Royal Adelaide Hospital. In August, he released a five-year plan that included evaluating two-year professional master's degrees in selected disciplines following three-year bachelor's degrees, with physiotherapy, occupational therapy and education identified as possible areas for consideration. The plan also included a cancer biology centre, a new great hall and other infrastructure developments across UniSA's four campuses.

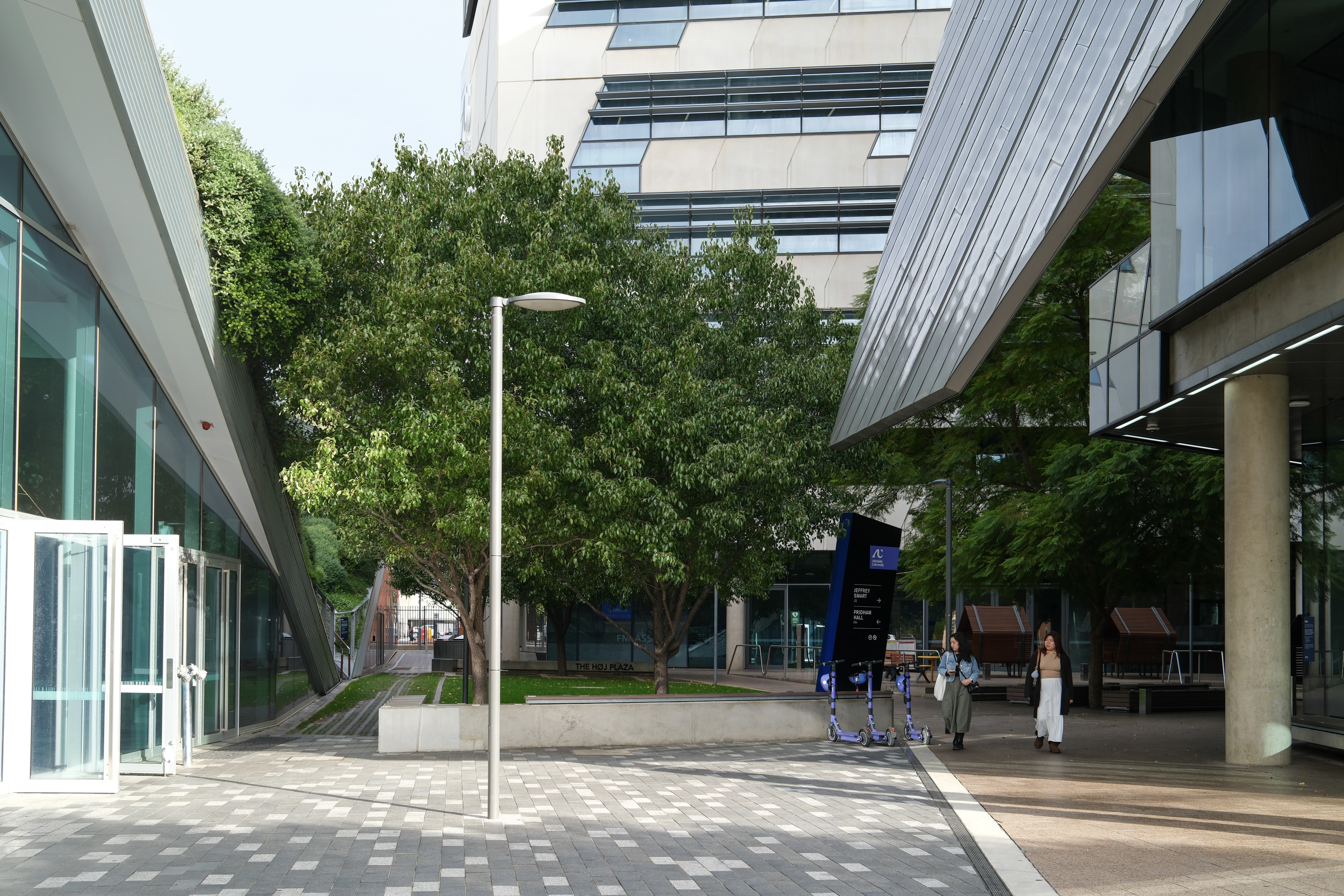
Pridham Hall (left), Høj Plaza (centre), and Jeffrey Smart Building (right) in 2026

Lloyd was appointed to the South Australian Health and Medical Research Institute board on 29 November 2013. In January 2014, he approved construction of a new great hall as part of UniSA's City West Campus development on Hindley Street, with the project comprising an underground hall, pool, student accommodation and a plaza adjoining the Jeffrey Smart Building. During 2014, he continued implementing UniSA's strategic and capital development programs, sought to increase international student numbers and opposed consolidation of South Australia's universities, arguing that a merger would create an overly large institution. His remuneration as vice chancellor increased from approximately $540,000–$550,000 in 2013 to $810,000–$820,000 in 2014; UniSA said the increase had been determined through sector benchmarking by the university council. In June, Lloyd was appointed to the state's 12-member Economic Development Board, which advised on economic development. In August, he supported discussions about establishing a single commercial entity for the corporate arms of South Australia's three universities. He also founded the Innovation and Collaboration Centre, a joint venture between UniSA, the Weatherill government and Hewlett Packard Enterprise intended to support innovation, entrepreneurship and business development.

In April 2015, UniSA rose from 49th to 35th among universities aged under 50 in the Times Higher Education University Rankings. Lloyd also promoted a proposal under which university fees would be announced five years in advance, with provision for subsequent reductions. In May, his appointment as vice chancellor was extended to 2022. In September, he facilitated a partnership between UniSA and China's Yabao Pharmaceutical Company to establish a drug discovery laboratory for cancer research. That month, he announced that the David Unaipon College of Indigenous Education and Research would cease operating as a separate college at the end of the year, with its courses transferred to other UniSA campuses, following recommendations from a government-commissioned report published in 2012. The proposal prompted concern among Aboriginal community members that integrating the programs into the wider university structure could reduce culturally safe services and environments. Lloyd said the institution-wide model would provide greater opportunities for Indigenous students and support increased Indigenous enrolments, including through the creation of an Indigenous pro vice-chancellor. Some Aboriginal representatives criticised the consultation process as insufficiently involving the local Indigenous community. In October, Lloyd became involved in establishing the Sir Terry Pratchett Memorial Scholarship after a letter from Pratchett expressing his wish for such a scholarship was discovered and referred to Lloyd.

As vice chancellor, Lloyd's remuneration rose by 9% in 2016, from roughly $880,000 to $960,000. In May 2017, he supported the establishment of the Saab Australia–UniSA Institute for Defence Technologies through a partnership between the two organisations. Based at Saab Australia's Mawson Lakes headquarters, the institute was intended to provide industry-based education and research in systems engineering, engineering, information technology and related fields. In October, Lloyd announced a three-year partnership between UniSA and the Adelaide Football Club covering both the AFL and AFLW teams. In November, plans were announced for the $247 million Health Innovation Building on North Terrace. Designed under Lloyd's leadership, the building was to incorporate the Cancer Centre for Biology, the Museum of Discovery and the Innovation and Collaboration Centre.

Pridham Hall main entrance in 2026

Lloyd remained a member of the Economic Development Board until 2018. In February 2018, UniSA completed its $50 million Pridham Hall on Hindley Street and took possession of the facility ahead of its first major event, a graduation ceremony scheduled for April. In June, Lloyd initiated discussions concerning a possible merger between UniSA and the University of Adelaide (UofA), reviving a proposal that had been considered periodically since 2010. A six-month process was established to examine the potential benefits, threshold issues and strategic risks, with Lloyd supporting the proposal. On 1 July, he was appointed to the Australian Research Council Advisory Council. In August, UniSA announced plans under its Enterprise25 strategy to redevelop the Magill campus as an aged-care facility for training, research and practice development in partnership with an aged-care organisation. In October, the merger discussions ended without agreement after the universities differed over key issues and risks. UofA subsequently confirmed that UniSA had decided not to continue negotiations. Lloyd said the UniSA Council had concluded that there was no compelling case for a merger and that the university would continue with its independent strategy.

In July 2019, UniSA announced a restructuring of its academic organisation under Lloyd's leadership, proposing to replace its 14 schools across four divisions, together with UniSA College, with seven academic units. In August, Lloyd was appointed chair of the Committee for Adelaide. By 2021, UniSA had developed a course in collaboration with aged-care provider ACH and established an Enterprise Partnership Hub at Light Square to facilitate businesses' access to university research. In an open letter, Lloyd characterised UniSA as a $700 million not-for-loss company employing more than 5,000 people; the characterisation was subsequently discussed in scholarly literature concerning the application of corporate efficiency and effectiveness principles to Australian universities. In June 2021, UniSA extended Lloyd's term as vice chancellor until December 2027, citing the university's 30-year anniversary and its Academic Enterprise Plan 2021–2025 under the Enterprise25 framework.

=== Adelaide University (2022–2026) ===
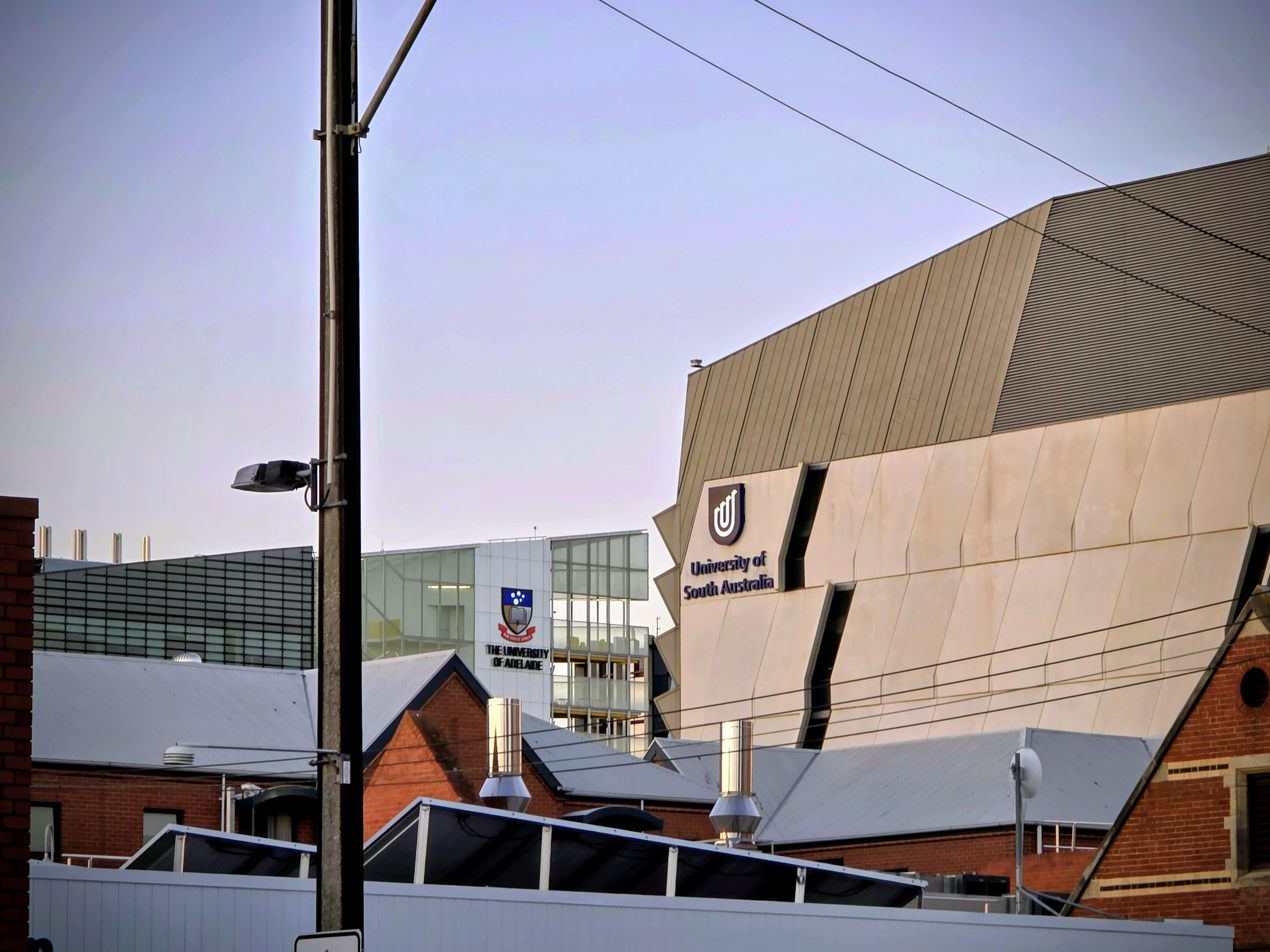
Adelaide Health and Medical Sciences Building of UofA and Jeffrey Smart Building of UniSA in April 2025, prior to the merger

In December 2022, Lloyd and UofA vice chancellor Høj proposed merging UniSA and UofA to establish Adelaide University (AU). Lloyd said the proposed institution would develop its curriculum in consultation with business and the community, incorporate digital technology into its courses and expand enrolments through online study, including among mid-career students from other Australian states. In March 2023, he proposed that companies could assist graduates with HECS-HELP debt through employment agreements linked to internships and advocated a government-backed, means-tested scholarship scheme for disadvantaged students, including mature-age students ineligible for Youth Allowance.

On 31 May 2023, Lloyd was confirmed as chair of Universities Australia, succeeding John Dewar. In July, Lloyd and Høj were parties to the agreement under which the two universities proceeded with the merger. Both university councils approved the proposal, which received about $450 million in Malinauskas government support for research and student assistance, the acquisition of UniSA properties and measures to attract international students. The universities committed to no compulsory redundancies or retrenchments resulting from the merger from its proposed commencement in January 2026 until 18 months afterwards. Under the December 2022 agreement, Lloyd and Høj were to serve as co-vice chancellors during the initial transition before an open competitive process to appoint a vice chancellor. On 8 March 2024, AU was established under the Adelaide University Act 2023, with Lloyd and Høj serving as co-vice chancellors during the transition. In April 2024, UniSA, the state government, defence industry representatives and the Australian Industry Group launched a degree apprenticeship program. Lloyd said the program would provide students with early experience in the South Australian defence industry and develop skills relevant to the sector; the government committed $450,000 over three years to the program.

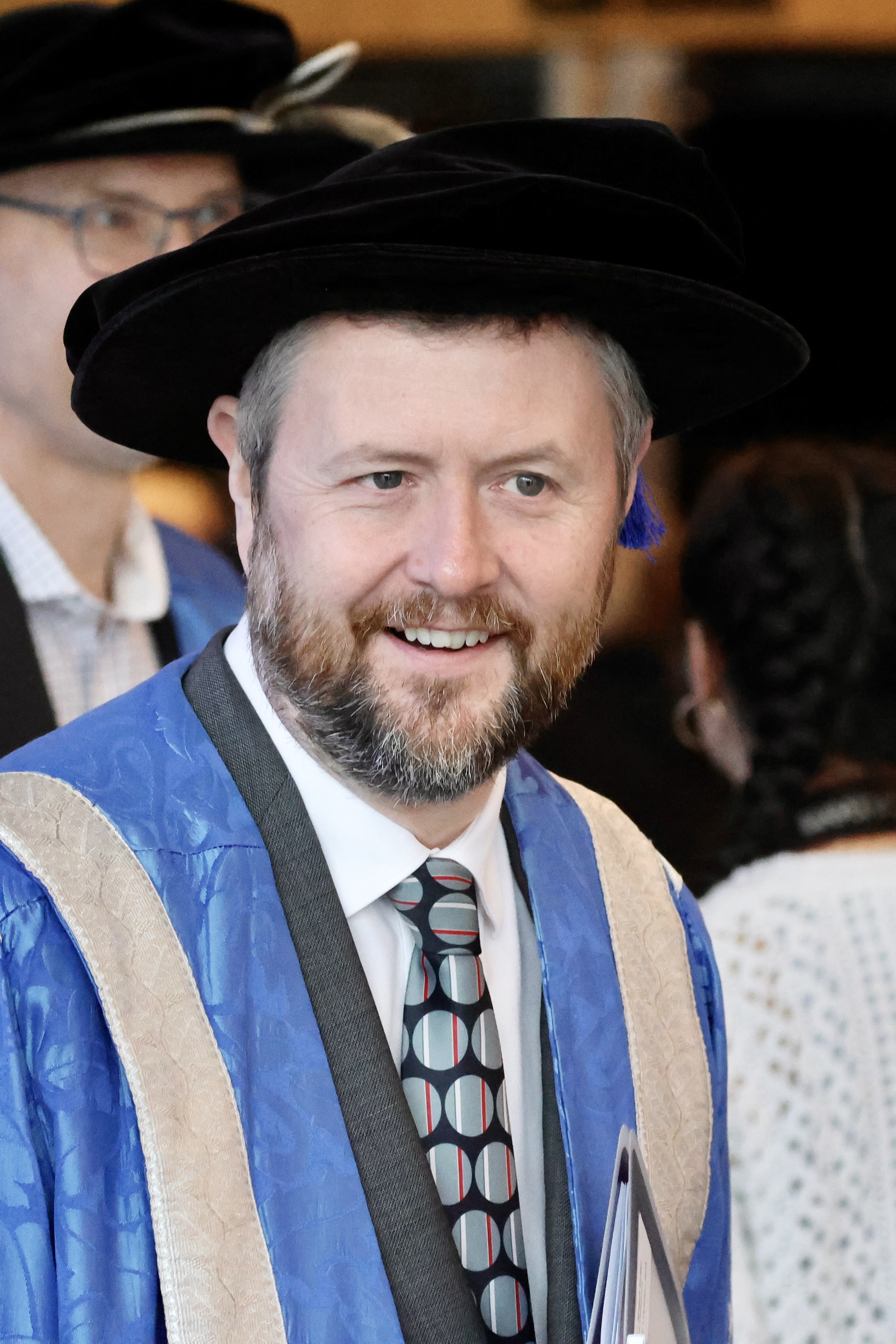
Lloyd as chancellor at a graduation ceremony at Pridham Hall in 2025

In January 2025, Lloyd and Høj announced that neither would seek appointment as AU's inaugural substantive vice-chancellor, citing their roles in overseeing the merger and the need to avoid a conflict of interest. Following an international recruitment process, Nicola Phillips was appointed (second) vice-chancellor and president and commenced on 12 January 2026. In May 2025, Lloyd told a South Australian parliamentary committee that 2,767 UniSA staff had transferred to AU through the merger, leaving him as the only remaining employee on the UniSA payroll. He also raised concerns about the effects of a proposed cap on international student numbers and visa costs on future enrolments. The estimated cost of the merger was reported at between $500 million and $650 million. Lloyd's term as chair of Universities Australia ended on 29 May 2025, when he was succeeded by Carolyn Evans. On 19 November, Lloyd was appointed to the board of governors of St Andrew's Hospital in Adelaide. In that same month, Lloyd and Høj appeared before an Australian Senate inquiry into university governance, where they discussed the merger, regulatory requirements and the integration of staff and operations. A farewell ceremony for Lloyd was held by Governor Frances Adamson on 6 February 2026.

In July 2026, AU Council stated that Lloyd's remuneration for 2025 and 2026 had not met community expectations. An auditor-general's report tabled in the South Australian Parliament recorded total remuneration of $3.112 million for Lloyd in 2025, comprising a base salary of $1.015 million, $209,000 in superannuation, a $1.128 million merger-related termination payment and about $760,000 in performance pay and long-service leave payments. The reported 2025 remuneration represented a 138 per cent increase from the $1.303 million he received in 2024 as UniSA vice chancellor and AU co-vice chancellor. Lloyd received a further $1.451 million payment in 2026 after leaving university management following completion of the merger. Education Minister Jason Clare criticised the $1.128 million termination payment and sought an explanation from the former UniSA council. AU stated that Lloyd's and Høj's remuneration arrangements had been determined by the respective university councils.

== Later career ==
Following his departure from AU, Lloyd established BlueRange Advisory, a consulting firm providing independent strategic advice on organisational and institutional change. As of 2026, he is a presiding member of Super SA.

He commenced as Interim Vice Chancellor of the University of Notre Dame Australia on Monday 28 September 2026, and will continue until the incoming Vice Chancellor commences in the role.

== Honours and recognitions ==
The Lloyd Building at Light Square, Adelaide in September 2026

In 2008, Lloyd was elected a fellow of Trinity College Dublin. He is also a Fellow of the Royal Society of Chemistry and an honorary professor at Tianjin University. In 2019, he was elected a Fellow of the Australian Academy of Technological Sciences and Engineering (FTSE). In November 2025, UniSA's Enterprise Hub building at Light Square was renamed the Lloyd Building in recognition of his service as the university's vice-chancellor. In March 2026 Lloyd was conferred with an honorary doctorate and an emeritus professorship by UniSA.

== Personal life ==
In 1995, Lloyd met his future wife, Annie Timlin, while they were both working at Waltons. He performed in bands and played several instruments, including guitar, keyboard, mandolin and hammered dulcimer. Lloyd has two adult children from his first marriage. He remarried, to Penny, in 2025. Lloyd was a friend of author Pratchett and wrote a review of Pratchett's The Shepherd's Crown in 2015, stating that they had been friends since 2008. He was also awarded an honorary Doctor of Unseen University, the fictional institution featured in Pratchett's novels. In October 2024 Penguin announced Lloyd as one of two contributing co-authors for the new introduction and annotations of the Modern Classics edition of Pratchett's bestselling novel, Night Watch.
