= Peter Høj =

Danish-Australian academic (born 1957)

Peter Høj AC FAA FTSE
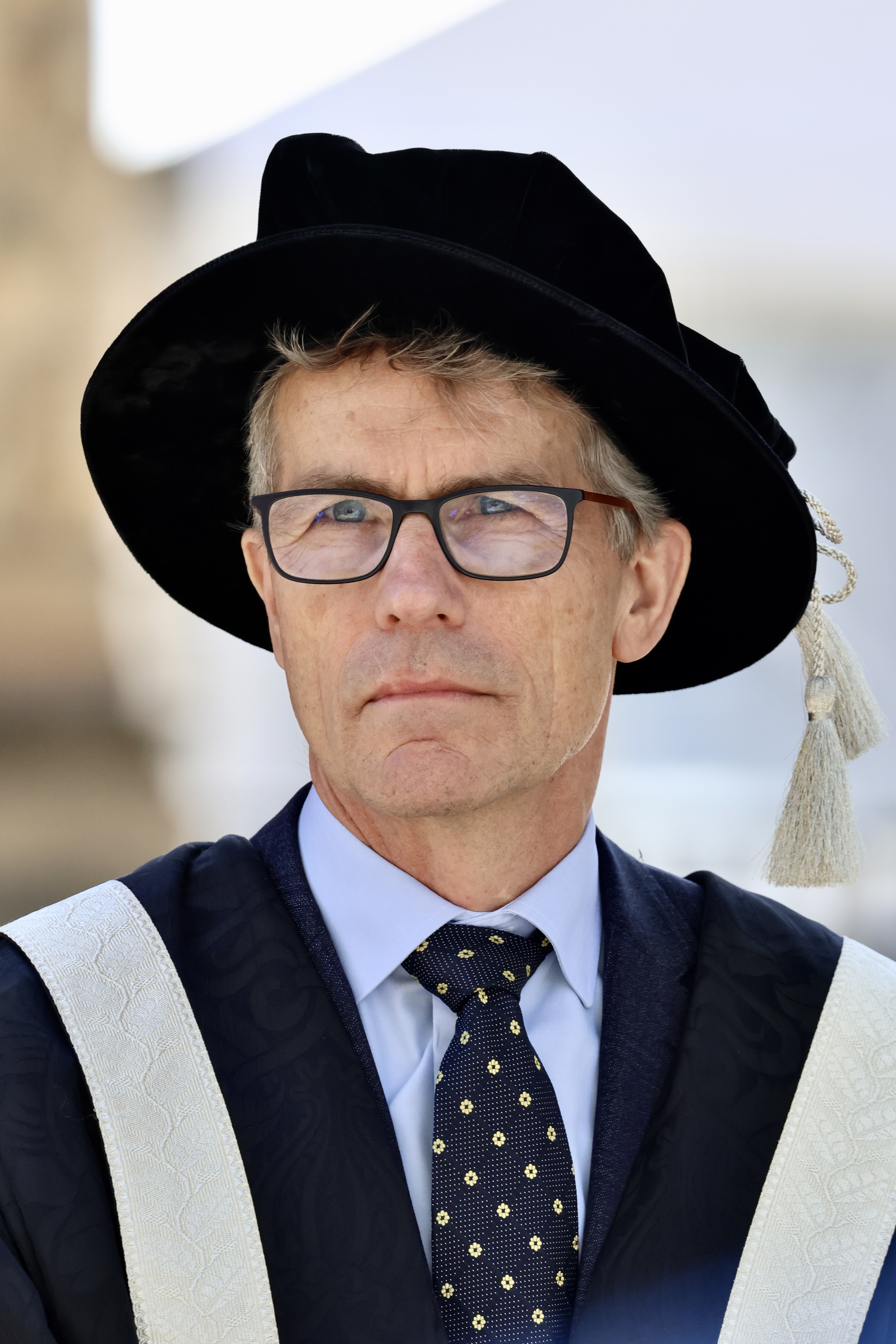
- Høj in 2025

Founding Vice-Chancellor of Adelaide University (Note: Even though Høj and Lloyd was appointed as the founding co-Vice Chancellor of Adelaide University, their successor Phillips became the first Vice Chancellor and President of the institution.)
- In office 8 March 2024 – 12 January 2026 Serving with David Lloyd
- Chancellor: Pauline Carr
- Preceded by: Position established
- Succeeded by: Nicola Phillips

24th Vice-Chancellor and President of the University of Adelaide
- In office 8 February 2021 – February 2026
- Chancellor: Catherine Branson
- Preceded by: Peter Rathjen; Mike Brooks (interim)
- Succeeded by: Position abolished

10th Vice Chancellor and President of the University of Queensland
- In office 8 October 2012 – 31 July 2020
- Chancellor: Peter Varghese
- Preceded by: Paul Greenfield; Deborah Terry (acting)
- Succeeded by: Deborah Terry

4th Vice-Chancellor and President of the University of South Australia
- In office 1 June 2007 – 31 August 2012
- Chancellor: Ian Gould; Jim McDowell
- Preceded by: Denise Bradley
- Succeeded by: David Lloyd

Personal details
- Born: Peter Bordier Høj; 29 April 1957 (age 69) Copenhagen, Denmark
- Spouse(s): Robyn van Heeswijk (died 2003) Mandy Thomas
- Children: 2
- Education: University of Copenhagen (BSc); Carlsberg Laboratory (MSc); Royal Veterinary and Agricultural University (PhD)

Academic background
- Thesis: Iron-Sulfur Proteins af Photosystem 1 (1987)

Academic work
- Discipline: Biochemistry
- Institutions: La Trobe University

Peter Bordier Høj (born 29 April 1957) is a Danish–Australian biochemist and university administrator. Having served as vice-chancellor of four universities, he was the longest-serving university vice-chancellor in Australia at the time.

Born and raised in Copenhagen, he did his education in biochemistry and chemistry at the University of Copenhagen, and then did his postgraduate education in genetics and plant biochemistry. In 1988, he relocated to Australia on a Danish scholarship, where he started off his teaching profession in La Trobe University and then became the professor of viticulture in the University of Adelaide in 1995 and director of Australian Wine Research Institute in 1997. From 2004 to 2007, he held the position of CEO of the Australian Research Council.

Høj subsequently held senior university leadership positions, holding positions of Vice Chancellor and President of the University of South Australia from 2007 to 2012, and the University of Queensland from 2012 to 2020. He served as Vice Chancellor of the University of Adelaide from 2021, and also held the position of co-Vice Chancellor of Adelaide University alongside David Lloyd during the transition period to the combined university from 2024 to 2026, following the appointment of Nicola Phillips as the second Vice Chancellor of Adelaide University.

== Early years and education ==
Peter Bordier Høj was born on 29 April 1957 in Copenhagen, Denmark, where he was raised by his parents, John and Bodil. His father, John, operated a fish and game meat business, while his mother, Bodil, worked as a nurse. His childhood experiences in the family business contributed to his early interest in science. Høj attended Birkerød Statsskole, where he graduated as dux, and chose to pursue science rather than medicine. Høj studied biochemistry and chemistry at the University of Copenhagen before completing a Master of Science degree in genetics at the Carlsberg Laboratory and a Doctor of Philosophy in plant biochemistry at the Royal Veterinary and Agricultural University in Denmark.

== Academic career ==
After completing his studies, Høj moved to Australia on a Danish scholarship and joined La Trobe University in 1988 as a postdoctoral associate, where he collaborated with Nick Hoogenraad on research into molecular chaperones and mitochondrial biogenesis. In 1995, he was appointed professor of viticulture at the University of Adelaide (UofA), and in 1997 became director of the Australian Wine Research Institute (AWRI).

Høj served as director of the AWRI from 1997 until his appointment as Chief Executive Officer (CEO) of the Australian Research Council (ARC), commencing on 1 October 2004. During his tenure at the AWRI, he adopted an interdisciplinary approach to research and development and served on several industry and government advisory bodies, including as a private member of the Prime Minister's Science, Engineering and Innovation Council (PMSEIC) from 1999 to 2004 and on the Steering Committee for the 2003 McGauchie Review of collaboration between universities and publicly funded research agencies. He served as CEO of the ARC from 2004 to 2007, was a council member of the Australian Institute of Marine Science from 1 March 2005 to 31 December 2009, and served as an ex officio member of PMSEIC from 2006 to 2007.

== University career ==
=== University of South Australia (2007–2012) ===
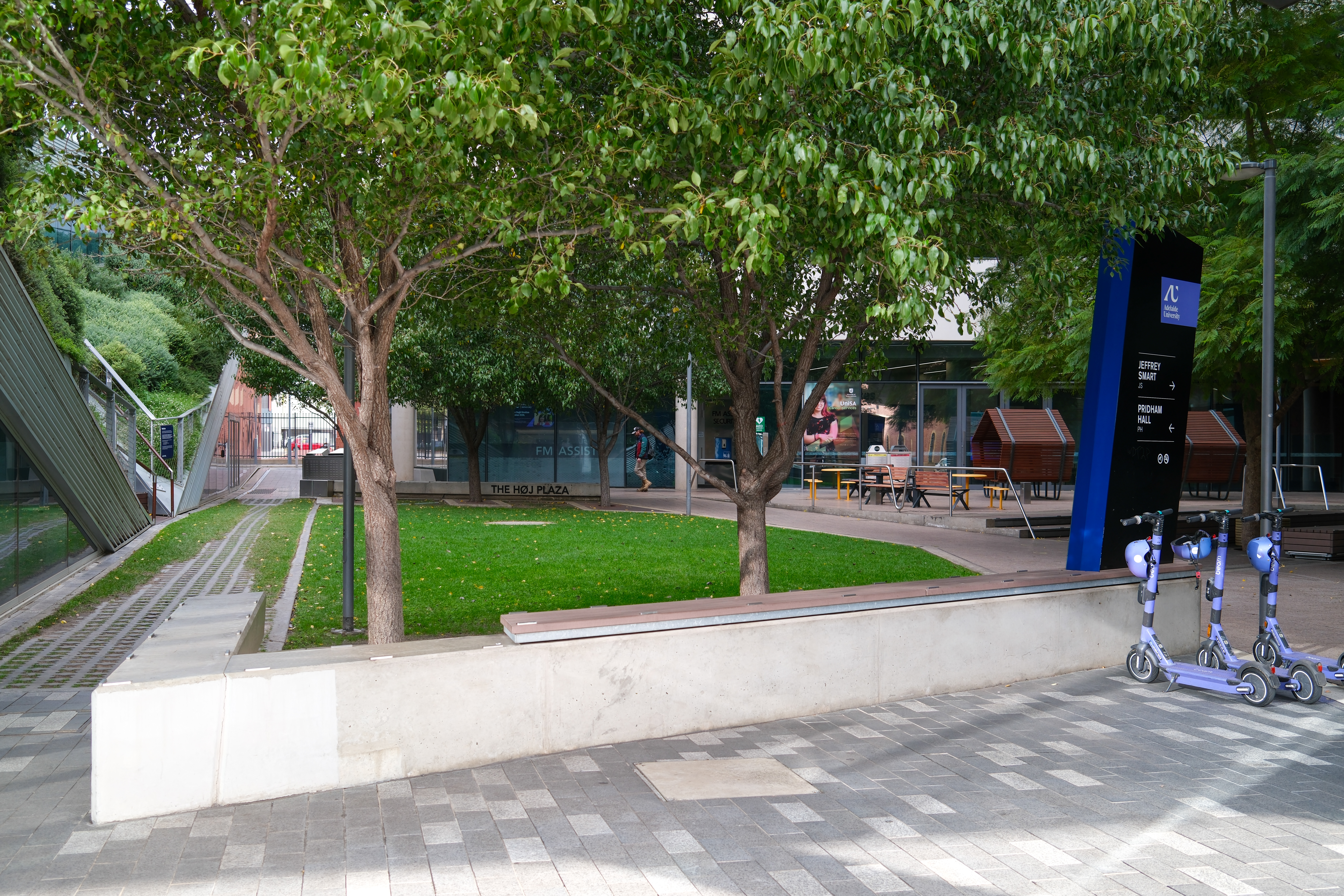
The Høj Plaza at Adelaide University's City West campus (formerly UniSA), 2026

Høj was appointed Vice Chancellor and President of the University of South Australia (UniSA) on 1 June 2007 and served in the role until 2012. During his tenure, the university improved its position among Australian universities in the QS World University Rankings, rising from 19th in 2009 to 11th in 2011, and was the most improved Australian university in the rankings for two consecutive years (2010–2011). During the same period, the proportion of the university's research assessed as at or above world standard in the Excellence in Research for Australia evaluations increased from about 70% in 2010 to 86% in 2012. Høj also oversaw a long-term infrastructure investment programme valued at more than A$1 billion, including the development of the A$90 million Jeffrey Smart Building and Learning Centre, whose plaza was later named in his honour.

Høj was scheduled to leave UniSA on 31 August 2012. His departure followed the conclusion of unsuccessful merger discussions between UniSA and UofA, a proposal he had supported as a means of reducing administrative duplication and increasing institutional scale for teaching, learning, and research. The negotiations ended after UofA decided to appoint its own vice chancellor, and Høj was succeeded as Vice Chancellor of UniSA by David Lloyd.

=== University of Queensland (2012–2020) ===
On 5 October 2012, Høj became Vice Chancellor and President of the University of Queensland (UQ), succeeded Paul Greenfield following Michael Keniger's resignation amid the university's medical school admissions controversy involving the admission of a family member who had not met all entry requirements. Shortly after taking office, Høj stated that he was aware of the controversy surrounding the university, had not discussed the matter with former senior executives, and had relied on media reports for information. He also acknowledged that the long-term effect of the controversy on the university's reputation would become clear over time. In responding to the admissions controversy, Høj said that the student concerned was not believed to have known that her admission had resulted from a non-merit-based process and that expulsion would generally require evidence that a student had provided false information.

Alongside his role at UQ, Høj served as a member of the Australian Research Committee from 2012 to 2014 and as a member of the Commonwealth Scientific and Industrial Research Organisation Board from 7 December 2011 to 6 December 2014. In 2013, he commented publicly on UQ's investigation into allegations of research misconduct relating to Parkinson's disease studies conducted by former researchers Bruce Murdoch and Caroline Barwood. Høj acknowledged that the university's initial investigation had been slow and said that a panel of experts had subsequently been appointed, leading to the retraction of a paper in August 2013.

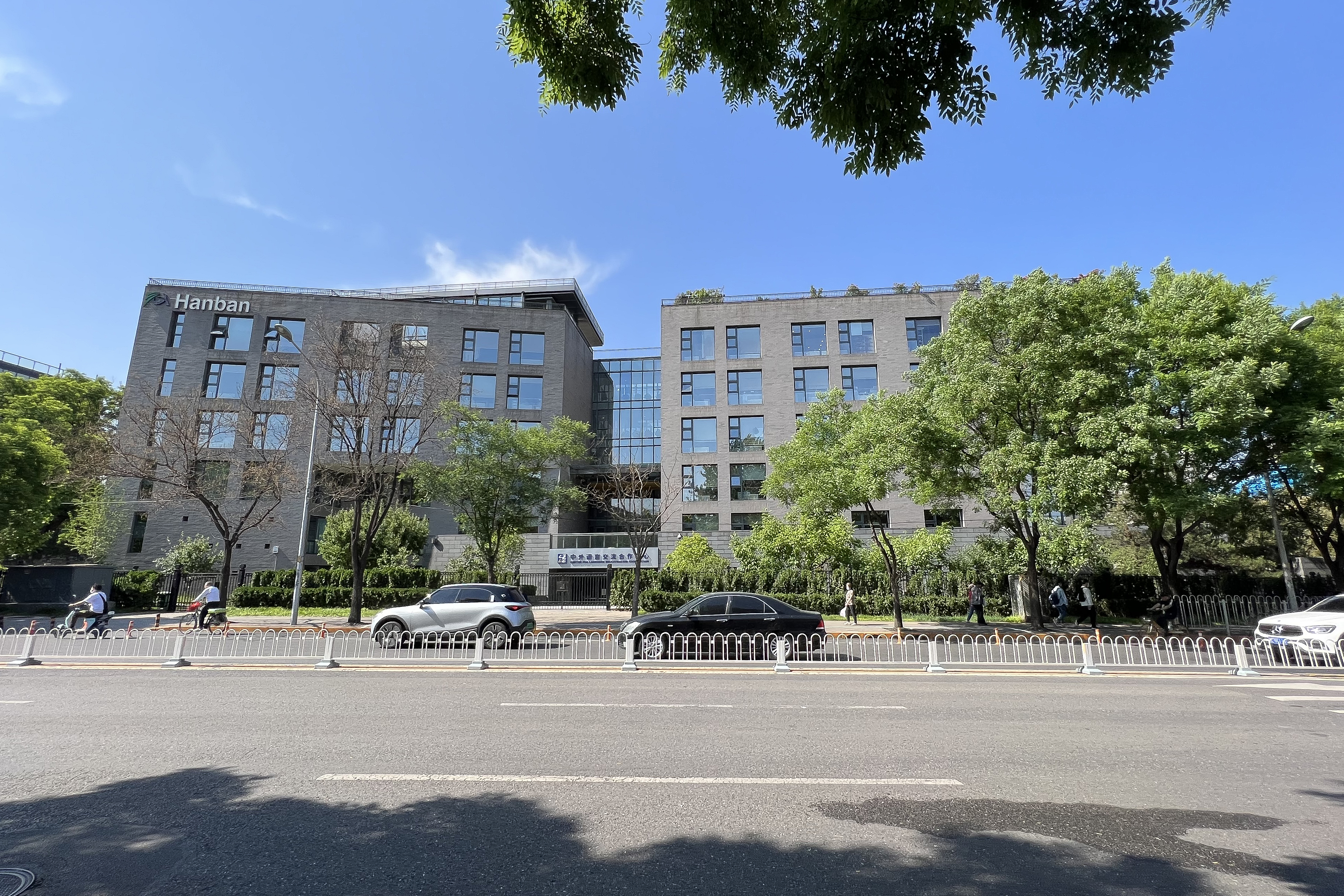
Headquarters of Hanban in Beijing, 2023

In late 2013 and January 2014, Høj reported that a review of approximately 100 publications had found no evidence of fabricated or missing data or broader research misconduct, although it identified issues relating to authorship, statistical methods in one paper, and a review article that cited the retracted study. He stated that these matters had been referred to the relevant journal editors and noted that Barwood had received a university research fellowship before the preliminary findings of the inquiry were available. During this period, Høj also served as an unpaid consultant to Hanban, the headquarters of the Confucius Institute, beginning in 2013. He later defended the role, stating that his involvement occurred during a period when Australian institutions were encouraged to strengthen engagement with China. In 2015, UQ was ranked as Australia's most productive research institution in the Nature Index. Høj attributed the result to previous investments by the Queensland Government in research capacity and support from Atlantic Philanthropies to attract researchers in the life sciences.

In 2016, Høj was appointed to the Australian Medical Research Advisory Board for the Turnbull government's Medical Research Future Fund. The UQ Senate reappointed Høj as vice chancellor and president on 4 March 2016 for an additional five years, making it possible for him to serve in the position until March 2021. Høj was appointed chair of the Group of Eight (Go8) on 29 November 2016, and he succeeded Michael Spence in January 2017. On 30 May 2019, Høj advised the university senate of his intention to retire as vice chancellor, effective 30 June 2020.

On 8 August 2019, Høj declared that UQ has entered into a memorandum of understanding with the Ramsay Centre for Western Civilisation, allowing for an extended major in Western Civilisation. The deal was justified by Høj in response to fears expressed by some staff and students regarding freedom of speech and donor involvement. The university, he said, will continue to have control over the curriculum, quality of teaching, admissions policy, staffing, and academic freedom, with the donations being described as a major investment in the humanities, which are struggling at the moment. In November, the university announce that their law faculty dean Patrick Parkinson will be joining the Centre for Western Civilisation, which was set up under an agreement between the university and the Ramsay Centre for Western Civilization. This comes amid continued controversy regarding the program, which includes criticisms of the effects on academic freedom and Ramsay Centre's involvement.

In October 2019, following reports that the Confucius Institute at UQ had contributed funding to university subjects developed in collaboration with the institute, Høj stated that the institute should not be involved in designing or teaching university courses. He said he had resigned from his unpaid advisory positions with Hanban after receiving advice regarding his responsibilities under the Foreign Influence Transparency Scheme. In April 2020, Høj and UQ came under public scrutiny following disciplinary action against student Drew Pavlou, who alleged that the proceedings were politically motivated because of his criticism of the Chinese government and the university's links with Chinese organisations. The university denied the allegation, stating that the disciplinary action related solely to breaches of university policies. In July, the university rejected Pavlou's internal appeal, reducing his suspension from two years to the remainder of the 2020 academic year and requiring him to complete 25 hours of campus service, while maintaining that the disciplinary decision was unrelated to his views on China and Hong Kong.

On 18 July 2020, Høj issued a statement to students defending the university's commitment to freedom of expression and stating that its relationships with China had not influenced teaching or academic freedom. He acknowledged, however, that changing public perceptions of those relationships could have broader economic implications for Australia, and noted that UQ had amended its agreements with the Confucius Institute and the Ramsay Centre to reinforce their institutional independence. Høj retired as Vice Chancellor and President of UQ on 31 July and was succeeded by Deborah Terry.

=== University of Adelaide (2021–2026) ===
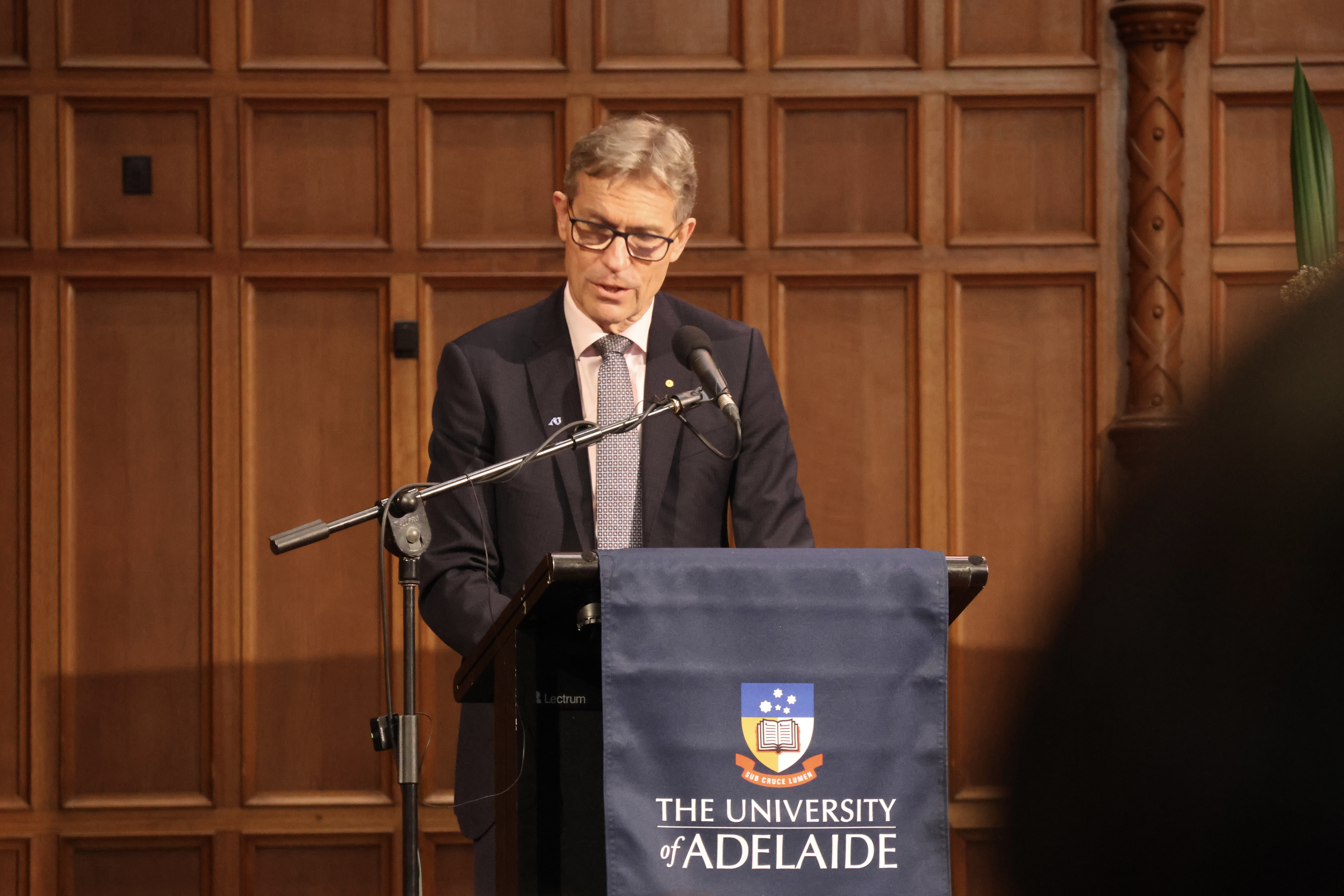
Høj speaking at the 2025 Julia Gillard Public Lecture in Bonython Hall

On 2 February 2021, UofA announced Høj's appointment as Vice Chancellor for a five-year term commencing on 8 February, following the resignation of his predecessor, Peter Rathjen. Shortly after taking office, Høj said his decision to return to South Australia was influenced by his long-standing connections with the state and a desire to contribute to its future. During the university's orientation programme, Pavlou organised a protest outside Bonython Hall in response to Høj's appointment. Soon after assuming office, Høj called on the Australian government to provide an additional A$1 billion in research funding for universities to help offset the financial impact of restrictions on international students during the COVID-19 pandemic. He also said that any future merger between UofA and UniSA should be considered within the broader context of the future of higher education in the state.

In December 2023, Høj delivered the second Bradley Oration at the University of Sydney. On 8 March 2024, Adelaide University (AU) was formally established under the Adelaide University Act 2023, with Høj and Lloyd serving as co-Vice Chancellors during the transition following the merger of the two universities. At the time, making him the longest-serving vice chancellor in the country. In January 2025, they announced that neither would seek appointment as the inaugural substantive Vice Chancellor of AU, stating that, as the joint vice chancellors responsible for overseeing the merger, they wished to avoid any conflict of interest. Following an international search conducted by the AU Transition Council, Nicola Phillips was appointed the second (though first substantive) Vice-Chancellor and President, commencing on 12 January 2026.

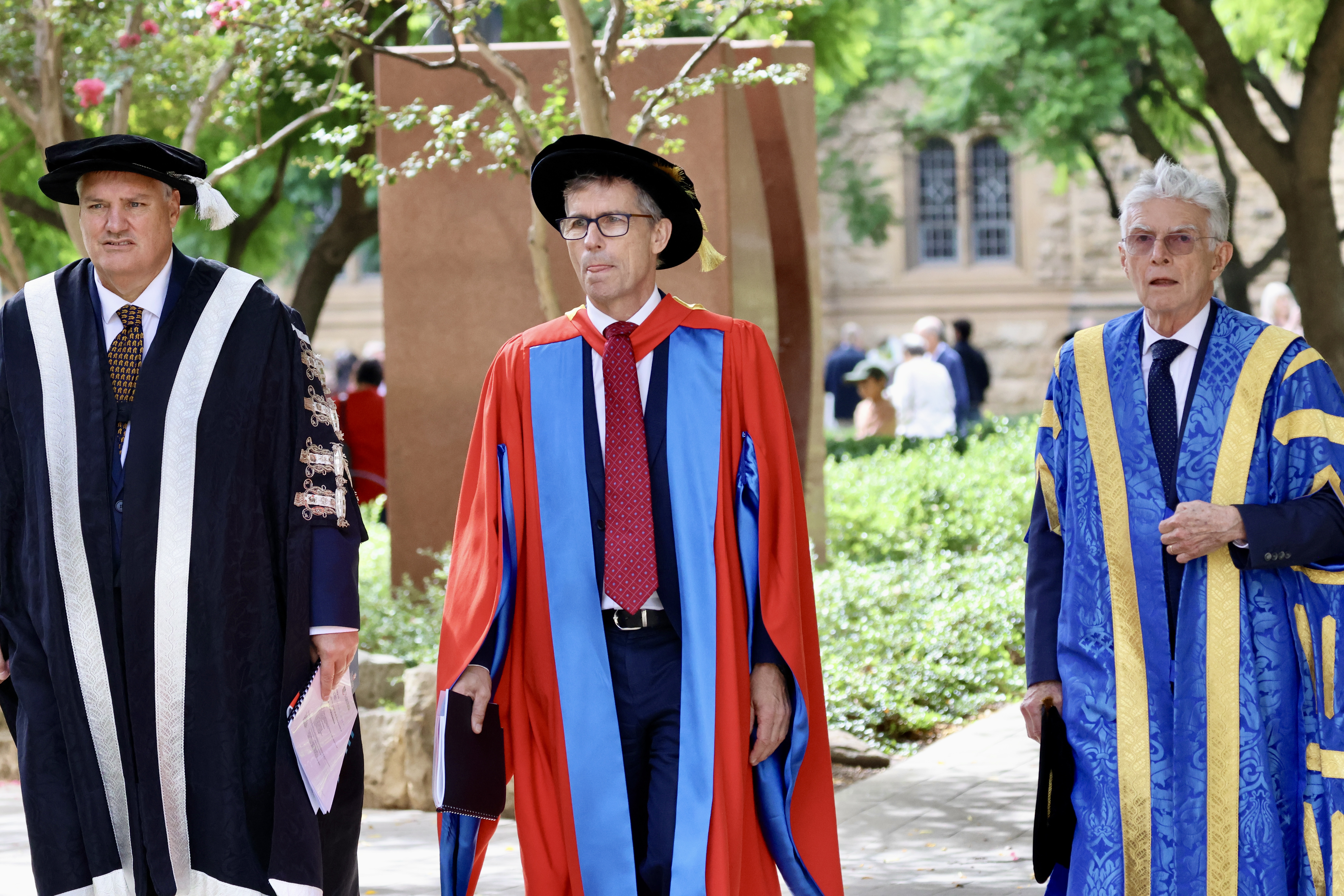
John Williams, Høj and John Hill at the final UofA graduation ceremonies following Høj's tenure as vice-chancellor, March 2026

In November 2025, Høj and Lloyd appeared before an Australian Senate inquiry into university governance in connection with the university merger. Høj discussed the increasing regulatory requirements for universities, stated that most staff had been placed in comparable roles following the merger, and addressed UofA's underpayment of casual employees, noting that compensation was underway. A farewell ceremony for Høj was held at Bonython Hall on 13 February 2026.

== Honours and awards ==
Høj was elected a Fellow of the Australian Academy of Technological Sciences (FTSE) by 2013 and became a foreign member of the Royal Danish Academy of Sciences and Letters in the natural sciences category. He was appointed a Fellow of the National Academy of Inventors in 2018 and a Fellow of the Australian Academy of Science (FAA) in 2022. His honours include the Centenary Medal, awarded by the Howard government in 2002 for services to science and the Australian wine industry, and the Companion of the Order of Australia (AC), awarded in January 2019 for service to higher education, science, research commercialisation, and policy development and reform. In 2015, he received the Outstanding Individual of the Year Award from Hanban, and in April 2019 he received the Asia-Pacific Leadership Award from the Council for Advancement and Support of Education.

Høj has received honorary degrees from several universities, including an honorary doctorate from UniSA in 2014, an honorary doctorate from the University of Copenhagen in 2008, a university honoris causa from UofA, and a Doctor of Science honoris causa from La Trobe University. He was awarded a Doctor of the University honoris causa by UQ in 2022 and received an honorary degree from the University of Surrey in 2025.

== Personal life ==
While undertaking his postgraduate studies in Denmark, Høj met his first wife, Robyn van Heeswijck, before the couple moved to Australia in 1987. Van Heeswijck was an academic in plant and microbiology research at UofA, and the couple had two children. She was diagnosed with breast cancer in the late 1990s and died in September 2003 at the age of 47. Høj later married retired academic Mandy Thomas.
