= David Klingberg =

Australian academic administrator and engineer

David Klingberg AO FTSE
- Klingberg in 2026

3rd Chancellor of the University of South Australia
- In office 1998–2008
- Deputy: Dagmar Egen (1992–2002); Alice McCleary (2002–2009)
- Preceded by: Basil Hetzel
- Succeeded by: Ian Gould

Personal details
- Born: David John Klingberg; 1944 (age 81–82) Loxton, South Australia, Australia
- Education: South Australian Institute of Technology
- Occupation: Civil engineer; businessman
- Awards: Centenary Medal (2001); Member of the Order of Australia (2003); Officer of the Order of Australia (2009)

David John Klingberg AO is a South Australian businessman, civil engineer and chancellor of the University of South Australia (1998–2008).

Between 1986 and 1998, Klingberg was managing director of engineering firm Kinhill Ltd. Klingberg is also a former director of Codan Ltd, Barossa Infrastructure Ltd, Snowy Hydro Ltd and former chair of the Premier's Climate Change Council in South Australia.

Klingberg was a director of Eyre Iron Pty Ltd, when it sought to develop the Fusion Magnetite Project circa 2011-13.

As of 2015 Klingberg is a director of ASX listed companies E&A and Centrex Metals Ltd. Klingberg is chair of a technical sub-group working on the Australian Government's National Radioactive Waste Management Project. Klingberg is a patron of the Cancer Council of South Australia and the St Andrew's Hospital Foundation.

As of 2017, Klingberg is a member of the Committee of the SA Division of ATSE.

== Honours ==
Klingberg has been highly decorated by the Australian Government for his service to engineering, the education sector, public policy and infrastructure development.

Klingberg received a Centenary Medal in 2001 for "service to Australian society in civil and mining engineering", was made a Member of the Order of Australia in 2003 for "contributions to the tertiary education sector and through engineering projects designed to improve infrastructure and services" and was made an Officer of the Order of Australia in 2009 for "service to the tertiary education sector as a contributor to governance policy, and to commercial and economic development and infrastructure projects".
