= Green Industries SA =

South Australian Government organisation

Green Industries SA is a South Australian government agency, established under the Green Industries Act 2004. It replaced Zero Waste SA.

It has jointly funded and supported a number of key South Australian waste management initiatives.

== See also ==
- Zero Waste SA
