= Basil Hetzel =

Australian medical researcher (1922 – 2017)

The Honourable Basil Hetzel AC FRACP FRCP
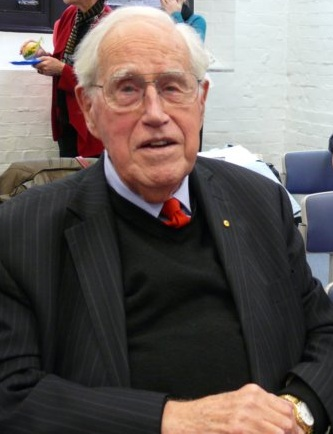
- Dr Basil Hetzel at the University of South Australia Library, City East campus, 2011

Lieutenant-Governor of South Australia
- In office 28 May 1992 – 18 April 2000
- Preceded by: Condor Laucke
- Succeeded by: Bruno Krumins

2nd Chancellor of the University of South Australia
- In office 1992–1998
- Preceded by: John McDonald
- Succeeded by: David Klingberg

Personal details
- Born: 13 June 1922 London, England
- Died: 4 February 2017 (aged 94) Adelaide, South Australia
- Education: University of Adelaide
- Profession: Scientist (Medicine, Epidemiology)

The Hon. Basil Stuart Hetzel AC (13 June 1922 – 4 February 2017) was an Australian medical researcher who made a major contribution to combating iodine deficiency, a major cause of goitre and cretinism worldwide.

== Early life and education ==
Hetzel was born in London to Elinor Hetzel (née Watt) and Kenneth Stuart Hetzel, an anaesthetist. Hetzel's parents were originally from South Australia but in London at the time while Kenneth worked at the University College Hospital. They returned to Adelaide in 1925. There he, along with his brother Peter (born 1924), was schooled at King's College and St Peter's College, Adelaide.

Hetzel studied medicine at the University of Adelaide from 1940 to 1944. As a medical student, he was granted reserved occupation status during World War II. He later applied to join the Royal Australian Air Force as a medical officer but was denied on grounds of being unfit due to a long bout of pulmonary tuberculosis in 1945.

He was a Fulbright Research Scholar in the 1950s which included an appointment at New York Hospital. In 1954, Hetzel and his family travelled to London where he undertook a Research Fellowship in the Department of Endocrinology and Metabolism at St Thomas' Hospital.

== Career ==
His first job after completing medical studies was as a Resident Medical Officer at Parkside Mental Hospital from 1946 to 1947. Upon completion of his Fulbright Scholar commitments, Hetzel was appointed as the first Michell Research Scholar at the University of Adelaide, where he remained for three years. He then undertook the role of Reader in Medicine at the Queen Elizabeth Hospital, Adelaide before moving to Monash University as the Foundation Professor of Social and Preventive Medicine. In 2001, the Queen Elizabeth Hospital established the Basil Hetzel Institute for Medical Research in his honour.

In 1956, Hetzel became a founding member of the South Australian Mental Health Association, and along with other members, went on to assist with the establishment of the crisis support service Lifeline which still runs today.

He also held the position of first chief of the CSIRO Division of Human Nutrition. Hetzel was the Chancellor of the University of South Australia from 1992, shortly after its establishment, until 1998. In 2005, the building for health sciences at the university's City East campus was named the Basil Hetzel building and the campus library also has a Hetzel room which contains a collection of his research. Hetzel was Lieutenant Governor of South Australia from April 1992 to May 2000. He was chair of the Bob Hawke Prime Ministerial Centre from 1998 to 2007.

=== Research ===
During the 1960s, Hetzel pioneered research in Papua New Guinea confirming the first definite link between iodine deficiency and significant brain damage in unborn children.

In the 1980s, Hetzel, supported by the Australian Agency for International Development, became an international advocate for iodine supplementation, which is now taken for granted with iodinated table salt. This was part of the stimulus for the creation of the Iodine Global Network, then called the International Council for Control of Iodine Deficiency Disorders (ICCIDD), which is funded by various government, non-government and community organisations including the United Nations, the Global Alliance for Improved Nutrition, UNICEF, the World Health Organization, and the World Bank. The ICCIDD is considered the expert body regarding iodine deficiency disorders and they implement national programs for the prevention of iodine deficiency. As a result of their advocacy, many countries have now legislated that salt for human and animal consumption must be iodised. Much of this success has been attributed to Hetzel's "indefatigable dedication to elimination of iodine deficiency disorders." In 2010, the ICCIDD established a Basil Hetzel International Award for Communications for individuals who contribute to promoting awareness of iodine nutrition.

== Other activities ==
Hetzel gave the ABC's Boyer Lecture in 1971, which he titled "Life and health in Australia".

Hetzel and his second wife, Anne, were patrons of the State Library of South Australia Foundation from 2001 to 2003, a very important time for the library's fund-raising program, to fund its redevelopment.

== Personal life and death ==
Hetzel married Mary Helen Eyles in 1946. Together they had five children: Susan, Richard, Robert, Jay, and Elizabeth. Mary died of cancer in December 1980.

In 1983 Hetzel married again, to Anne Fisher, the widow of the headmaster of Geelong Grammar School, Charles Fisher. Anne Hetzel OAM grew up in Rhodesia and studied music at the Guildhall School of Music and Drama in London. She first married Charles Fisher, having six children with him. After moving from England to Rhodesia to Australia, she attended university and later worked as a teacher. Charles died in a car accident, and Anne went to work with Governor-General Sir Zelman Cowen and his wife in Canberra, where she met Hetzel. She supported his work, including travelling with him, and during this time developed a love of art and textiles.

Hetzel was a member of Pilgrim Uniting Church in Adelaide.

Hetzel died on 4 February 2017, aged 94.

== Recognition and honours ==
- 1964: Eric Susman Prize, a prize for medical research presented by the Royal Australasian College of Physicians
- 1989: Honorary professor at the Tianjin Medical University
- 1990: Companion of the Order of Australia
- 1993: Alwyn Smith Prize, Faculty of Public Health Medicine, UK
- 1997: RSL Anzac Peace Prize
- 1999: Doctor of the University, University of South Australia, 1999
- 2001: Clinical Research Centre at the Queen Elizabeth Hospital named the Basil Hetzel Institute for Medical Research
- 2004: National Trust as a National Living Treasure
- 2005: Adelaide Festival of Ideas dedicated to him
- 2008: Prince Mahidol Award from King Bhumibol Adulyadej of Thailand
- 2009: Pollin Prize for Pediatric Research

In 2000, following the completion of his term as lieutenant-governor, in an unusual break from convention, Hetzel was conferred the title 'The Honourable' by Elizabeth II on 20 July 2000 for his services.

In 2006, the lecture theatre in the State Library's Institute Building was named Anne and Basil Hetzel Lecture Theatre.

Government offices
Preceded by Sir Condor Laucke	Lieutenant-Governor of South Australia; 1992–2000	Succeeded by Bruno Krumins
