= Martin Daubney (judge) =

Australian lawyer

Alfred Martin Daubney AM (born 18 January 1961) was appointed as a judge of the Supreme Court of Queensland in 2007. He is an honorary fellow of the Australian Catholic University, a member of the senate of the University of Queensland and president of the King’s College council at the University of Queensland. In July 2021 he was appointed chancellor of the Australian Catholic University and took up the position in January 2022.

== Education ==
Daubney attended Downlands College, a co-educational Catholic school located in Toowoomba. He graduated from the University of Queensland with a Bachelor of Arts and Bachelor of Laws.

== Legal career ==
After completing articles of clerkship, Daubney was admitted as a solicitor in April 1987, becoming a barrister in 1998. He was appointed Senior Counsel in 2000.

In addition to his practice in Queensland, he also practiced as a barrister in the High Court of Fiji from 1994-2007.

While a barrister, Daubney was involved in the administration and regulation of the profession, first as honorary treasurer of the bar association of Queensland from 1998-2005. In 2005 he held the position of vice-president of the Queensland Bar Association, to be appointed president in 2006. Daubney was also a director of the Law Council of Australia and a member of the Council of the Australian Bar Association from 2006-2007.

While holding these positions within the Bar Association, he was an active member of the management committee of the Queensland Bar Practice Course from 2000-2007 and of the Legal Practitioners Admission Board, 2004-2007.

In 2004-2005, Daubney chaired a commission of inquiry into the Queensland Thoroughbred Racing Industry.

== Judicial career ==
Daubney was sworn in as a judge of the Supreme Court in the Trial Division on 18 July 2007. He has been involved in many cases of note, including some very serious cases in the criminal sphere and some important commercial matters.

== Extra judicial positions ==
Daubney has been president of the King's College Council at the University of Queensland since 2009 and has been a member of the senate of the University of Queensland since 2010. Daubney also served from 2007-2009 as the chair of the Law School Advisory Committee for the University of Southern Queensland. In 2007 he was made an honorary fellow of the Australian Catholic University. He was a director of the Stuartholme School Foundation from 2003-2011.

As a member of the University of Queensland's senate, he was subject to an unlawful investigation by the Crime and Misconduct Commission following the university's admission scandal involving the admission of the daughter of then vice-chancellor Paul Greenfield. Daubney challenged the legality of the investigation to the commission's parliamentary committee as the CMC's role does not involve the investigation of judicial officers in such a situation, even though he was performing in a non-judicial role.

Daubney has also been a member of the Queensland Law Society's Commercial Litigation Specialist Accreditation Advisory Committee since 2007. He was a national vice-president and Queensland chair of the Australian Association of the Sovereign Military Order of Malta from 2008 to 2014, and has been a member of the Catholic Archdiocese of Brisbane Finance Council since 2011.

In June 2018, Daubney was appointed a Member of the Order of Australia for significant service to the law, and to the judiciary, to education and to the community.

In 2026, Daubney was honoured with the award from Pope Leo XIV of a Papal Knighthood as a Knight of St Gregory the Great, conferred by the Roman Catholic Archbishop Shane Mackinlay, and presented by Emeritus Archbishop Mark Coleridge. The award citation commended Daubney for “exemplary service to the Church, the law and the wider community over many decades, marked by integrity, intellectual distinction, personal faith and a deep commitment to justice and good governance”.

== Publications ==
- M Daubney, G Mullins, G O'Grady, M Rackemann, Time Limits in Queensland (Queensland Law Society, 1997)
- R Byers, M Daubney, J Green, The Company Secretaries Handbook (Butterworths, 1990)
