= South Australian Minerals & Petroleum Expert Group =

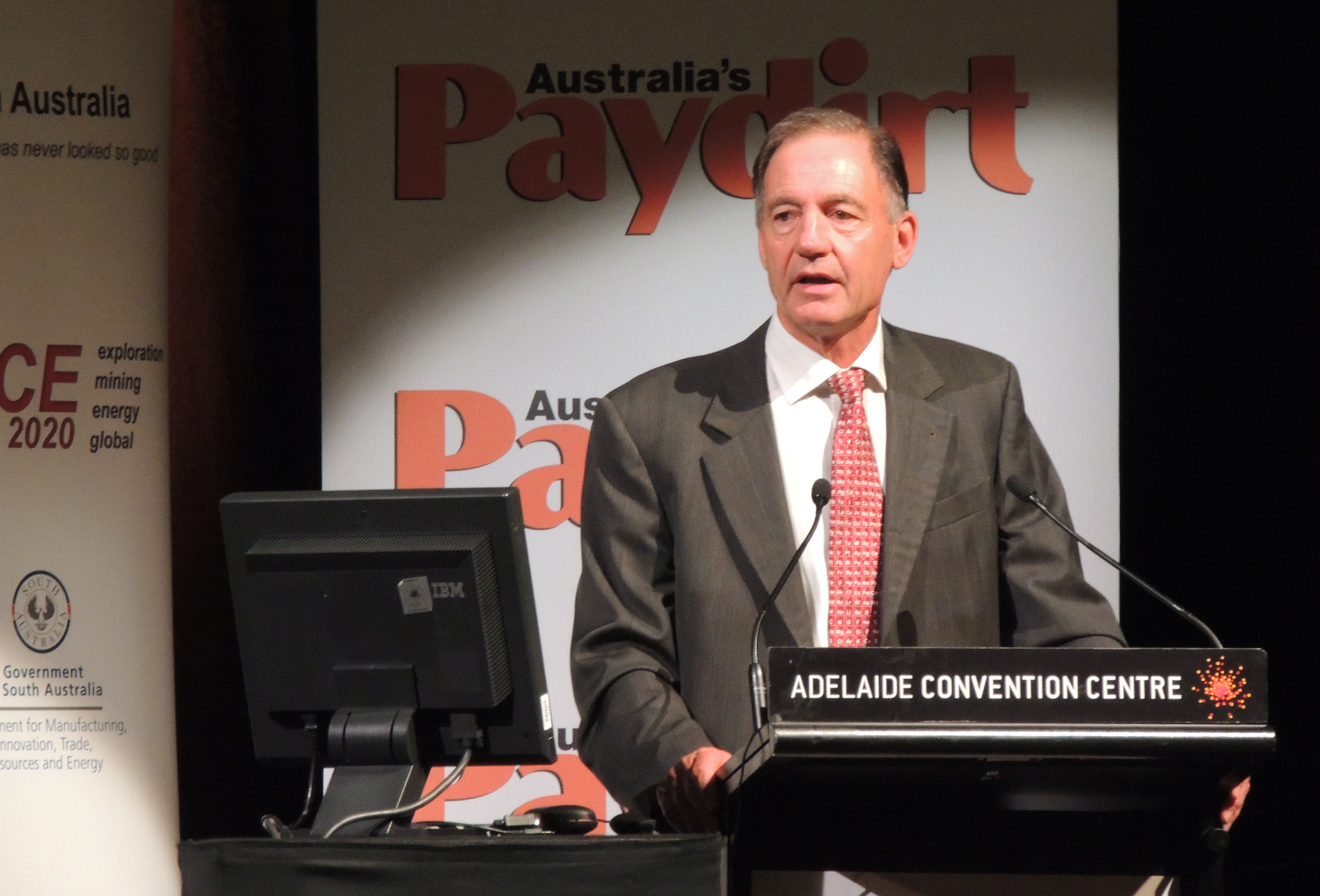
Derek Carter from SAMPEG speaks at Paydirt Uranium Conference 2013 in Adelaide, South Australia

The South Australian Minerals and Petroleum Expert Group (SAMPEG) was first created by the Government of South Australia in 2004. Appointments were made by Premier Mike Rann under Theme 8 of the PACE (Program for Accelerated Exploration) initiative, with the aim of addressing historical perceptions of South Australia's poor mineral and petroleum prospectivity. Appointed members include high-profile national and international leaders in the resource sector. SAMPEG promotes the message that South Australia’s resources potential is under-explored and that the State Government "is willing to back investors in the resources sector, in a strategic, tangible and substantial way, including subsidised drilling and new, free, pre-competitive data."

SAMPEG members also address public perception of the sector by informing the public of improving performance in environmental management, good governance and engagement with local and indigenous communities. This group replaced the original PACE proposal to appoint a single Ambassador. The group currently includes 16 members.

== Membership ==
As of 2014, SAMPEG membership includes the following persons:

- Ross Adler AC
- Terry Burgess
- Pauline Carr
- Derek Carter
- Owen Hegarty
- Dr Ian Gould AM (chair)
- Geoff Knight
- Robert J Champion de Crespigny AC
- Hugh M Morgan AC
- Leon A Davis AO
- Paul Dowd
- John Roberts
- Erica Smyth
- Kerry Stokes AC
- Trevor Sykes
- Keith R Yates

The original Chair of SAMPEG was Robert J Champion de Crespigny AC. This position was passed to Ian Gould following de Crespigny's relocation to the United Kingdom in 2006.

== Objectives ==
SAMPEG's objectives include:

- to attract new explorers to South Australia
- to identify companies to be strategically targeted for meetings
- to undertake promotional activities and plan events to further attract investment
- to advise the Minister for Mineral Resources Development
- to achieve third party endorsement of the credentials of the PACE initiative and South Australia’s mineral prospectivity; and
- to support explorers in South Australia by publicizing their successes to the wider investment community

== Achievements 2004-2009 ==
As of 2009, SAMPEG's achievements include hosting a variety of dinners and cocktail events, including some in association with Minister Paul Holloway. The PACE program received the inaugural Premier’s Award for Growing Prosperity in 2008. SAMPEG and/or PACE programs featured in a variety of publications including AusIMM Bulletin, Independent Weekly, Australia’s Paydirt, The Australian Mining Club Journal, Gold and Minerals Gazette, Australia's Mining Monthly Magazine, SACOME’s regular publication and the SA Mining and Petroleum Bulletin during this period. PACE has a regular feature in each volume of the Department of State Development's (previously DMITRE) MESA Journal, which is published on a quarterly basis through the Minerals and Energy Resources Division.

The Chair of SAMPEG, Dr Ian Gould, was appointed to the Economic Development Board and to Chancellor of the University of South Australia in 2008. SAMPEG Chair and various members held regular briefings as required with Premier Mike Rann and Minister Paul Holloway. SAMPEG claims to have been largely responsible for the record increase in exploration expenditure in South Australia during this period by its promotion of the state's prospectivity. The group has also been responsible for facilitating a number of joint venture deals and new entrants to South Australia following promotional activities.
