= Peter Serwan =

Australian artist

- Born: 1962 (age 63–64); Mount Gambier
- Known for: Oil paintings

Peter Serwan (born 1962, in Mount Gambier) is an Australian artist and educator based in Adelaide, South Australia. Serwan works mostly in the medium of oil paint however he is also a fine printmaker. Serwan is known for his paintings' focus on suburban life and the human experience. His artwork features both impressionist works as well as key figures from his own like including family and friends. His works have been known to showcase the nuanced exploration between human existence and urbanization. Serwan has exhibited frequently in Australia and is represented in private and institutional collections.

== Background ==
Born in Mount Gambier in 1962 to Polish immigrant parents, Serwan grew up with three siblings in a Catholic household and spoke Polish only until starting school at the age of 5. Serwan attended Tenison Woods College, Mount Gambier (1975 – 1979) and art classes at the local TAFE. Serwan completed a Bachelor of Fine Arts at the University of South Australia in 1983 before undertaking a Graduate Diploma in Visual Arts teaching at the Gippsland Institute of Advanced Education. From 1984 he taught at the Catholic Regional College in Traralgon in the Latrobe Valley, where he lived and worked until moving to Adelaide in 1996.

== Works ==
Pruning Apple Trees (1978), painted when Serwan was still at high school, showing the artist's father in the back garden is impressionist in style, utilising gesture, and bright colour to capture an image of his immediate environment. Life: A Symphony in White (1979), depicts chooks in an outdoor setting, Morwell Back Yard (1987) and LaTrobe Valley Roadside (1986) use structural elements of fences, gateways, buildings, and posts to create compositional interest.

In the 1990s, Serwan's works increasingly included figures. Figures first made an appearance in Serwan's works form the 1980s, notably the artist's father, Frank Serwan. In Manifestations of Time (1990), the artist's father stands in a backyard next to a Hills Hoist clothesline, a Black Madonna appears at one window if the house behind him, a naked figure of woman in another. A flayed ox carcass, based on Rembrandt's Slaughtered Ox (1655) can be seen in the distance - a motif that appears prominently in another work depicting his father in a back yard setting Figure in a Yard (1989). Figure in a Landscape (1994) sees the artist's father again standing next to a clothesline. This time he is in profile with one arm raised. The work Evening Interlude (1995) sees an elderly man holding a baby in a backyard. A cat scrambling over the fence is a counter to the solemn atmosphere.

Between 2000 and 2004, Serwan produced a series of large-scale paintings in which the composition is tilted upwards. In Suburbia (2000), a couple stand surrounded by suburban boundary fences, on the other side of which people mow their lawns. In Suburban Interlude (2003) a girl holds a cat at the bottom left of the picture, hemmed in on three sides by a fence, a somewhat cruciform Hills Hoist, and a wheelie bin to her right. Similarly, Dwellers I (2004), is composed of various tableaus occurring in isolation from one another, divided by backyard fences. Marking Time I (2004) presents two scenes, on either side of a backyard fence – a woman holding a baby on her hip, on one side, an older man watering his garden on the other.

By 2005, Serwan's figures were relocated from their backyards, to stand out the front of their houses, or to look out from their front windows. Weltanschauung (2005) sees faces stare out of windows, in various states of contemplation. Posed like Renaissance portraits, which the artist intended as a means of conveying that these characters are endowed with a ‘world view’. Sanctum (2005), with its basis in the notion of the Trinity, poses three figures, each of them based on people known to the artist, in the setting of an ordinary street, a white dove with wings outstretched above in the dawn sky. Other works relocate characters away from their houses entirely, placing them in sea-side piers, as in Seafarers (2001), or bus stops as in Bus Stop (2002).

Breadwinners (2009), positions men in suits of various ages on a staircase. In New Estate (2007) a middle-aged man carries a ‘green’ shopping bag up a flight of stairs to a dwelling in a new housing estate which, we infer, includes a supermarket. In Fringe Dwellers (2010) new estates feature as ‘pop-ups in the landscape’.

Serwan's exploration of the phenomenon of urbanisation continued, including Promised Land (2015). The work is dominated by a central billboard and features orange bunting.

Bunting and billboards appear often in Serwan's works. As devices they lend both compositional structure and meaning. The billboard in Promised Land, with its glamorous figures, seemingly entranced by the prospect of living in the estate shown in the background, is a nod to the promise of consumerism to accommodate our deep desires. Partially obscuring the estate in the background, Serwan suggests that no one really knows what's going on in these nice new houses. The work, Serwan says, ‘taps into the deception of blissful outward appearances in a society obsessed with the bright and shiny...the peeing dog ‘throws water’ on the appearance of tranquil bliss.. outward appearances can be deceptive.’

== Solo exhibitions ==
- 1995: Recent Works, Riddoch Art Gallery, Mount Gambier
- 1996: Paintings and Studies, Latrobe Valley Regional Gallery, Victoria
- 1998: Peter Serwan, Hill Smith Gallery, Adelaide
- 1999: Peter Serwan: Recent Paintings, Riddoch Art Gallery, Mount Gambier
- 2000: Peter Serwan: Paintings, Hill Smith Gallery, Adelaide
- 2002: Peter Serwan: Recent Paintings, Hill Smith Gallery, Adelaide
- 2003: Peter Serwan: Recent Paintings, Libby Edwards Galleries, Sydney
- 2004: Peter Serwan: A Survey Exhibition 1984 - 2004, Riddoch Art Gallery, Mount Gambier
- 2006: Peter Serwan: New Paintings, Hill Smith Gallery, Adelaide
- 2007: Peter Serwan: Recent Paintings, Libby Edwards Galleries, Melbourne
- 2009: Graphic Work 1984 - 2008, Gippsland Art Gallery, Sale, Victoria
- 2010: Peter Serwan: New Paintings, Hill Smith Gallery, Adelaide
- 2013: Urban Sojourn: Selected Works by Peter Serwan 2002 - 2012, Latrobe Regional Gallery, Victoria
- 2015: Business as Usual, Hill Smith Gallery, Adelaide
- 2022: Day Follows Night, The Main Gallery, Adelaide

== Selected group exhibitions ==
- 1995: Contemporary Gippsland Painters, Latrobe Regional Gallery, Victoria
- 2000: Three Adelaide Painters, Riddoch Art Gallery, Mount Gambier
- 2002: Fleurieu Art Prize, McLaren Vale, South Australia; Adelaide Festival Exhibition, Hill Smith Gallery, Adelaide; Works of Distinction, Hill Smith Gallery, Adelaide
- 2003: Tattersall's Club Landscape Art Prize, Brisbane
- 2005: Kedumba Drawing Award, New South Wales; James Farrell Self Portrait Award, Castlemaine Art Museum, Victoria; Sydney 05 Art Fair
- 2006: John Leslie Art Prize, Gippsland Art Gallery, Victoria
- 2007: Director's Choice, Hill Smith Art Gallery, Adelaide; Whyalla Art Prize, Whyalla, South Australia; Tattersall's Art Prize, Brisbane; James Farrell Self Portrait Award, Castelemain Art Gallery, Victoria; McArthur Cook Art Awards, Melbourne, Victoria
- 2008: Fleurieu Landscape Prize, McLaren Vale, South Australia
- 2009: James Farrell Self Portrait Award, Castlemaine Art Gallery, Victoria; Figurative Painting, Hill Smith Gallery, Adelaide; Transformer: Views from the Valley, Latrobe Regional Art Gallery, Victoria
- 2012: John Leslie Art Prize, Gippsland Art Gallery, Victoria; Parallel Lines: Recent Work by Robert Clinch and Peter Serwan, Riddoch Art Gallery, Mount Gambier; Melbourne Art Fair, Melbourne Exhibition Building
- 2013: Represented Artists: South Australian Living Artists (SALA) Festival Roll Call, Hill Smith Gallery, Adelaide
- 2014: Walking the Line, Hill Smith Art Gallery, Adelaide; Artist's Studio Mixed Works, Hill Smith Gallery, Adelaide
- 2016: Menagerie, Hill Smith Art Gallery, Adelaide; Best in Show: Dogs in Australian Art, Orange Regional Gallery, New South Wales; The Landscape, Hill Smith Gallery, Adelaide
- 2017: Saint Ignatius' College Art Show, Adelaide
- 2018: Metropolis (curated by Carolyn Kavanagh), Adelaide Airport
- 2019: Feels Like Home, Praxis ARTSPACE, Adelaide

== Collections ==
- Latrobe Regional Gallery, Victoria
- Riddoch Art Gallery, South Australia
- Narracoorte Art Gallery, South Australia
- The Joseph Brown Collection, Melbourne
- Luciano Benetton Imago Mundi Collection, Treviso, Italy
- Newman College, University of Melbourne
- Aquinas College, University of Adelaide
- Saint Ignatius College Riverview, Sydney
- Saint Ignatius College, Adelaide
- Prince Alfred College, Adelaide
- St Peter's College, Adelaide
- Yalumba Wine Company, Adelaide
- The Adelaide Club, Adelaide
