= Paul Greenfield =

University of Queensland President and Vice Chancellor 2008-2012

Professor Paul Greenfield AO

9th Vice-Chancellor of University of Queensland
- In office 1 January 2008 – 13 January 2012
- Preceded by: John Hay
- Succeeded by: Peter Høj

Personal details
- Born: Paul Fawcett Greenfield
- Profession: academic, administrator

Academic background
- Education: University of New South Wales

Academic work
- Discipline: Engineering
- Sub-discipline: Chemical engineering
- Institutions: University of Queensland

Paul Fawcett Greenfield AO was the President and Vice Chancellor of The University of Queensland from 1 January 2008 to 13 January 2012.

== Career ==
As Vice Chancellor, he was the university's chief executive officer and responsible to the University Senate for the overall direction of strategic planning, finance and external affairs. As a chemical engineer, he was made an Officer in the General Division of the Order of Australia in 2006 for service to science and engineering, thereby providing recognition of his "distinguished service of a high degree to Australia". His annual salary in 2010 was reported to be A$1,069,999.

Greenfield resigned from his position as president and vice-chancellor of the university on 13 January 2012 in the aftermath of what was known as the UQ admissions scandal. The scandal related to an "irregularity" in the enrolment of a student in the medicine course who was a "close relative" of his. He had planned to step down in mid-2012 but changed his mind on 9 December 2011 and said he would leave the university on 13 January 2012. It was subsequently revealed that the "close relative" was in fact his daughter, Charlotte Greenfield, who was offered a place in the medicine course despite not having met the entry requirements and being ranked below 343 other applicants who were not admitted. The Queensland Crime and Misconduct Commission (CMC) investigated the matter and issued an investigative report in September, 2013. As Charlotte was unaware of the actions on her behalf, she remained in the University of Queensland's medical school and has since graduated as a registered medical practitioner.

Greenfield was the Chair of the Australian Nuclear Science and Technology Organisation from February 2011 to August 2014.

== Honours ==
- Centenary Medallist in 2001 for service to Australian society in chemical engineering.
- Officer of the Order of Australia in the 2006 Australia Day Honours.
