= John Hill (Australian politician) =

Australian politician (born 1949)

The Honourable John Hill FAICD
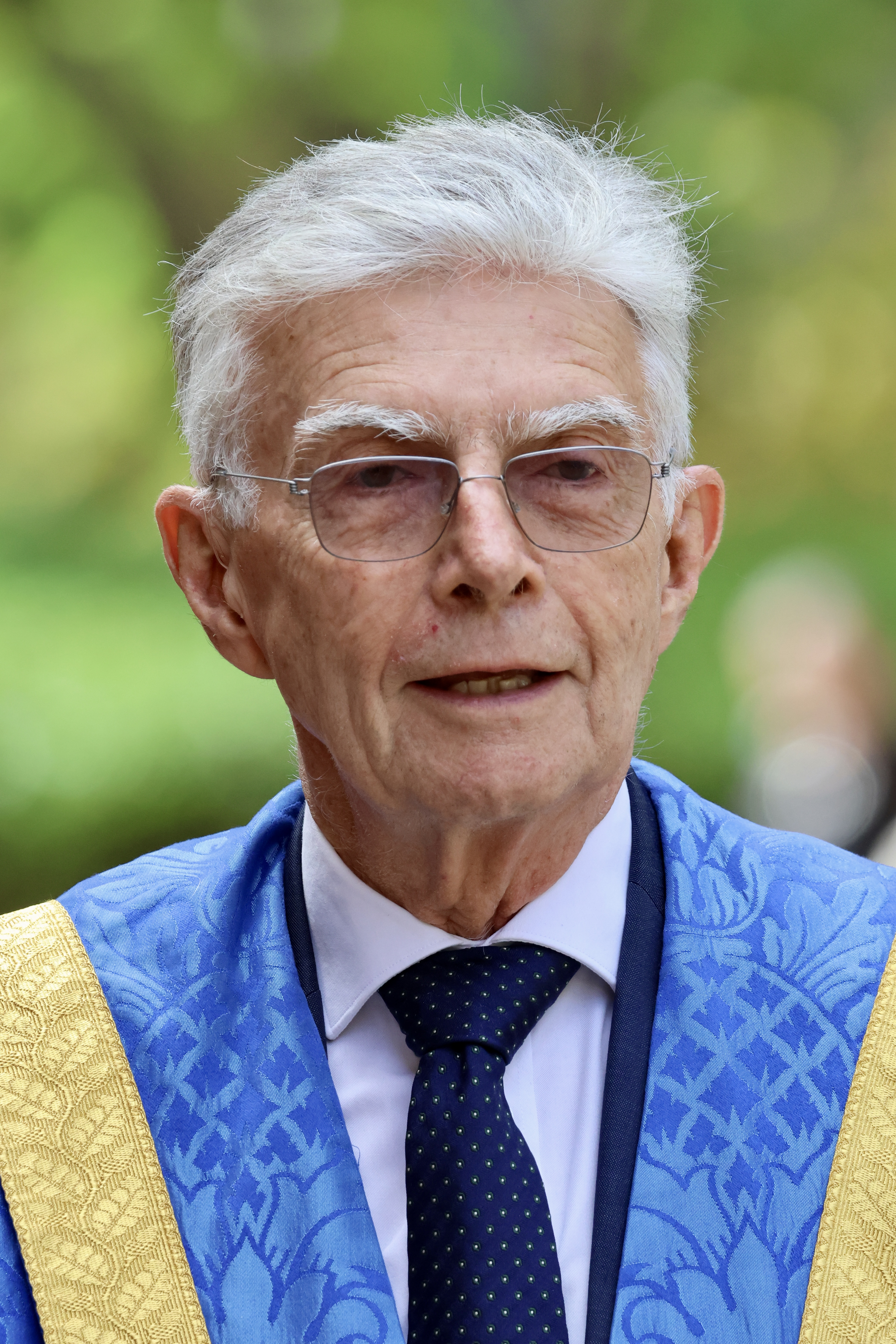
- Hill in 2026

7th Chancellor of the University of South Australia
- In office 2 May 2024 – 31 March 2026
- Deputy: Michael Abbott
- Preceded by: Pauline Carr
- Succeeded by: Position abolished

5th Deputy Chancellor of the University of South Australia
- In office 19 December 2018 – 2 May 2024
- Chancellor: Pauline Carr
- Preceded by: Wendy Craik
- Succeeded by: Michael Abbott

Member of the South Australian Parliament for Kaurna
- In office 11 October 1997 – 14 March 2014
- Preceded by: Lorraine Rosenberg
- Succeeded by: Chris Picton

Personal details
- Born: John David Hill; 1949 (age 76–77) Sydney, New South Wales, Australia
- Party: Labor
- Spouse: Andrea Dale
- Children: 2
- Education: University of Sydney (BA); University of Adelaide (LLB)
- Occupation: Lawyer; politician; teacher

John David Hill (born 1949) is an Australian lawyer and former politician in the South Australian House of Assembly as member of the Australian Labor Party from 1997 until 2014. He was a cabinet minister between 2002 and 2013 under Premiers Mike Rann and Jay Weatherill. Later, he was the 7th and final Chancellor of the University of South Australia from 2024 to 2026.

Hill was born in the western suburbs of Sydney. He received a Bachelor of Arts degree from the University of Sydney and a Diploma of Education and Bachelor of Law from the University of Adelaide. Hill relocated to South Australia in 1974 drawn by the reform policies of the Dunstan government and worked as a schoolteacher and later joined law. He served as a Labor organiser and state secretary before securing Kaurna seat in 1997.

In his role as minister for the environment, Hill played a key role in the setting up of Zero Waste SA, environmental protection areas, and bans on plastic shopping bags. In his role as the health minister, he guided the health care planning process and contributed in the setting up of South Australian Health and Medical Research Institute and construction of the new Royal Adelaide Hospital. Hill left cabinet in January 2013 and parliament in March 2014.

Following his exit from parliament, Hill had various governance positions in aging care, medical research, the arts, and higher education. He was the chairman of the South Australian Film Corporation and Private Healthcare Australia and the independent assessor for the Stolen Generations Reparations Scheme of South Australia. Hill assumed the post of Deputy Chancellor of the University of South Australia in December 2018 and Chancellor in May 2024. He served in this capacity until the university was dissolved and transformed into Adelaide University in 2026.

== Early life and education ==
John David Hill was born in the western suburbs of Sydney in 1949. Hill received a Bachelor of Arts degree from the University of Sydney and a Diploma of Education and Bachelor of Law from the University of Adelaide (UofA).

Hill settled in South Australia in 1974 drawn towards the social reforms of the South Australian government headed by Don Dunstan. Hill was employed as a schoolteacher between 1974 and 1986 before becoming a lawyer.

== Political career ==
=== Early political career (1982–2002) ===
The 1982 South Australian state election saw Hill unsuccessful in his bid to contest Mitcham for the Australian Labor Party (ALP). He was a ministerial assistant from 1986 to 1989, and then a state party organiser from 1989 to 1994. In the 1993 election, he ran against the Liberal Party's Lorraine Rosenberg for Kaurna, but lost the seat. He was the state secretary of Labour in South Australia from 1994 to 1997.

Hill succeeded in winning Kaurna at the 1997 election on 11 October, which had an 8.7 per cent swing to him, while also being the ALP's state campaign director. In his first term in parliament, he was selected to serve on committees studying water allocations in the South East region from December 1998 to August 1999, the Murray River from November 1999 to July 2001, and groundwater resources in the South East from May 2001 to January 2002.

=== Rann government (2002–2011) ===
Hill kept his seat of Kaurna in the election of February 2002, winning 61.0 per cent of the two party preferred vote against Liberal Party candidate Lauren Susan Kenyon. In the new Rann government he was appointed Minister for Environment and Conservation, River Murray, Gambling, Southern Suburbs and Minister Assisting the Premier on Arts on 6 March 2002. He was also a member of the Executive Council. He resigned from his gambling portfolio on 3 December of that year. From July 2002 to February 2006, he sat on the select committee examining the Crown Lands (Miscellaneous) Amendment Bill.

Furthermore, he was responsible for the consumer affairs and multicultural affairs portfolios from 30 June to 29 August 2003. Zero Waste SA was formed in July 2003 when he was the Minister for Environment. They then developed the state's Waste Strategy 2005–2010.

In 2003, Hill came under investigation for parliamentary privileges after Iain Evans accused him of misleading parliament on whether he had received departmental advice concerning the low-level waste repository. As per Michael Atkinson's subsequent report, Hill had been briefed on the repository through an incoming ministerial brief of 1,500 pages, despite what he had told parliament regarding his lack of recommendation from the department.

On August 2003, Hill appealed for increased funding from the Howard government to return water flows back into the River Murray and recommended a A$250 million contribution from the federal government towards an intended total funding of $500 million, whereby the participating states would contribute the other half. On December of that year, Hill was appointed chairman of the select committee that reviewed the Statutes Amendment (Co-managed Parks) Bill, up to February 2006.

Hill was against the proposal of the federal government to build a radioactive waste site at Woomera. He openly criticised the project during a public meeting held in February 2004. Later that year, his tenure as Minister for River Murray expired on 23 July. In October, Hill stated his intention to propose the formation of Yellabinna Wilderness Protection Area in Yellabinna Regional Reserve.

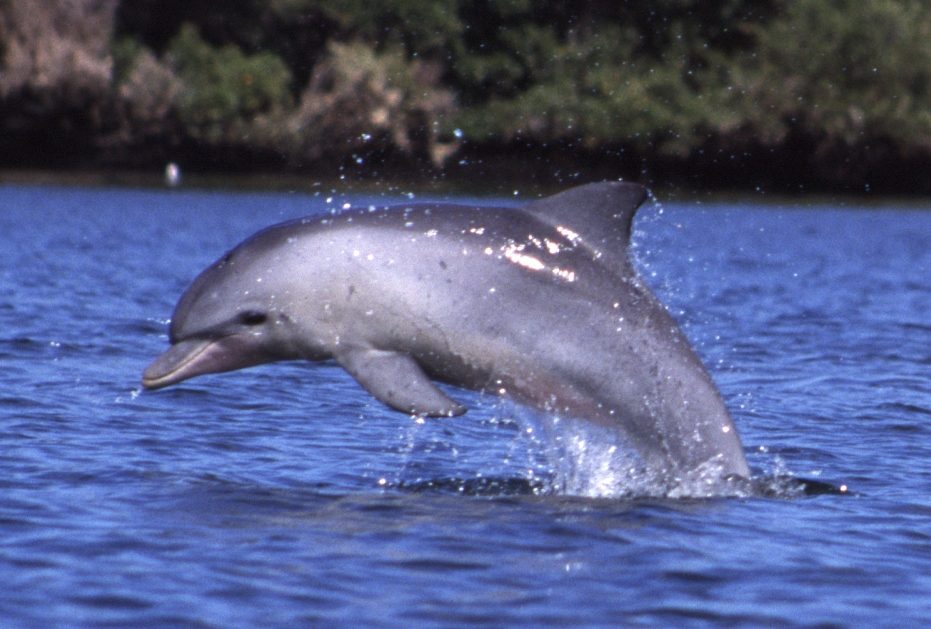
Dolphin in the Port River, 2003

Coongie Lakes National Park was created in March 2005. This was followed by the Adelaide Dolphin Sanctuary Act was enforced in June 2005 and ensured the protection of dolphins and their habitat in the Port River and Barker Inlet. In the meeting of environment ministers in July, Hill advocated for a nation-wide ban on plastic shopping bags to be implemented in 2009 and South Australia would impose the ban starting from 2008 if other jurisdictions do not consent. In 2025, Hill and his successor, Gail Gago, was later praised by Deputy Premier Susan Close for pushing the state to act alone while other states rejected the ban during a ministers' conference held around 2006.

On 4 November 2005, Hill was made Minister for Health while holding the portfolios of environment and conservation. In the election held in March 2006, he successfully defended his seat of Kaurna by gaining 72.0 per cent of the two-party-preferred vote, winning by 22.0 percentage points. Hill ceased to serve as environment minister on 23 March 2006. While serving as health minister, Hill developed a healthcare strategy for ten years that would modernise healthcare services and ensure a balance between hospital and community-based care.

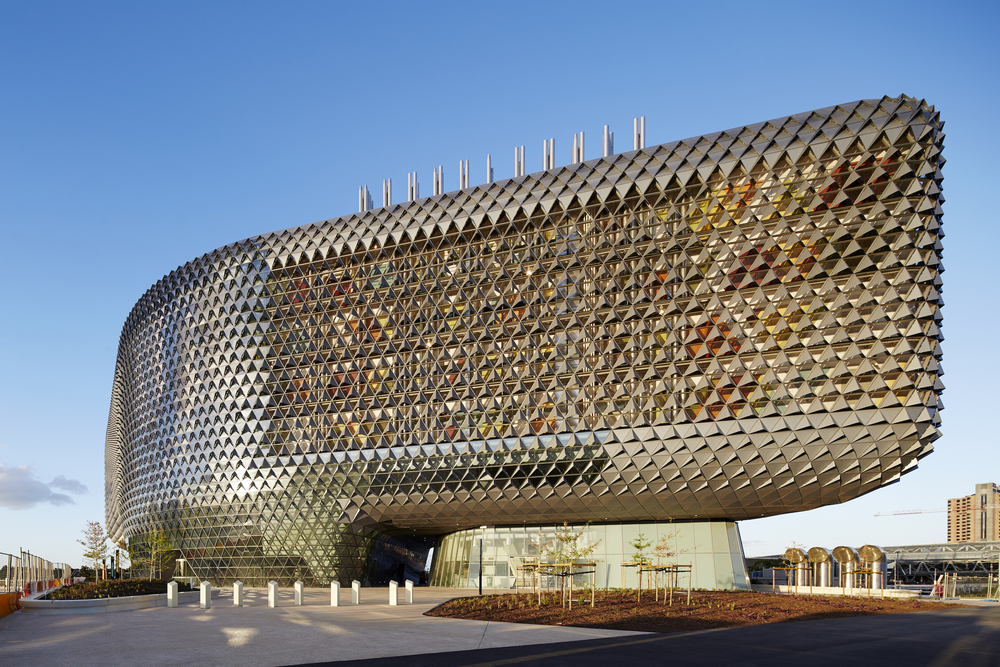
South Australian Health and Medical Research Institute on North Terrace, 2014

Through Hill, the Rann government appointed John Shine and Alan Young in 2008 to review the state's health and medical research sector. Among other suggestions, their review suggested setting up an independent research institution that resulted in the formation of the South Australian Health and Medical Research Institute (SAHMRI).

A restructure of the country health service that was suggested met with criticism in June 2008. This restructure would categorise 66 country hospitals into three groups and consolidate their operations in Whyalla, Port Lincoln, Berri and Mount Gambier. Geoff Brock, the mayor of Port Pirie and a member of the Rural Doctors Association, voiced their concerns regarding the restructure.

The opening plaque at Port Adelaide Ambulance Station, unveiled by Hill in 2009

Hill denied there was a cover-up of the calibration of equipment that went wrong at the Royal Adelaide Hospital (RAH) and resulted in about 900 cancer patients being given less radiation from July 2004 to July 2006. Between November 2008 and February 2009, he was also a member of the committee considering the Kapunda Hospital (Variation of Trust) Bill. He apologised in December 2008 after a computer programming mistake at the Women's and Children's Hospital led to 11 children receiving chemotherapy treatments 17 per cent more than prescribed. There were no negative impacts on the children as per an independent report.

Hill worked with Prime Minister Kevin Rudd and Premier Mike Rann to unveil designs of the federally funded SAHMRI research building worth $200 million, which will hold 675 researchers in February 2010. Kaurna was re-elected to Hill on the back of 58.6% of the two-party preferred vote in March 2010, defeating his Liberal opponent. There was a swing of 13.3% away from Hill. Atkinson went on to describe his performance as "a drop after a very high vote" and attributed it to Hill's consistent local campaigning. On 25 March, Hill received an extra portfolio in the area of mental health and substance abuse.

Planning for the construction of the new RAH started in February 2011. In May, Hill supported the public–private partnership of the project as more economical than a government contract. Upon the release of a leaked investor prospectus with the figures, he cited parliamentary privilege against Jim Katsaros for leaking the document.

=== Weatherill government (2011–2014) ===
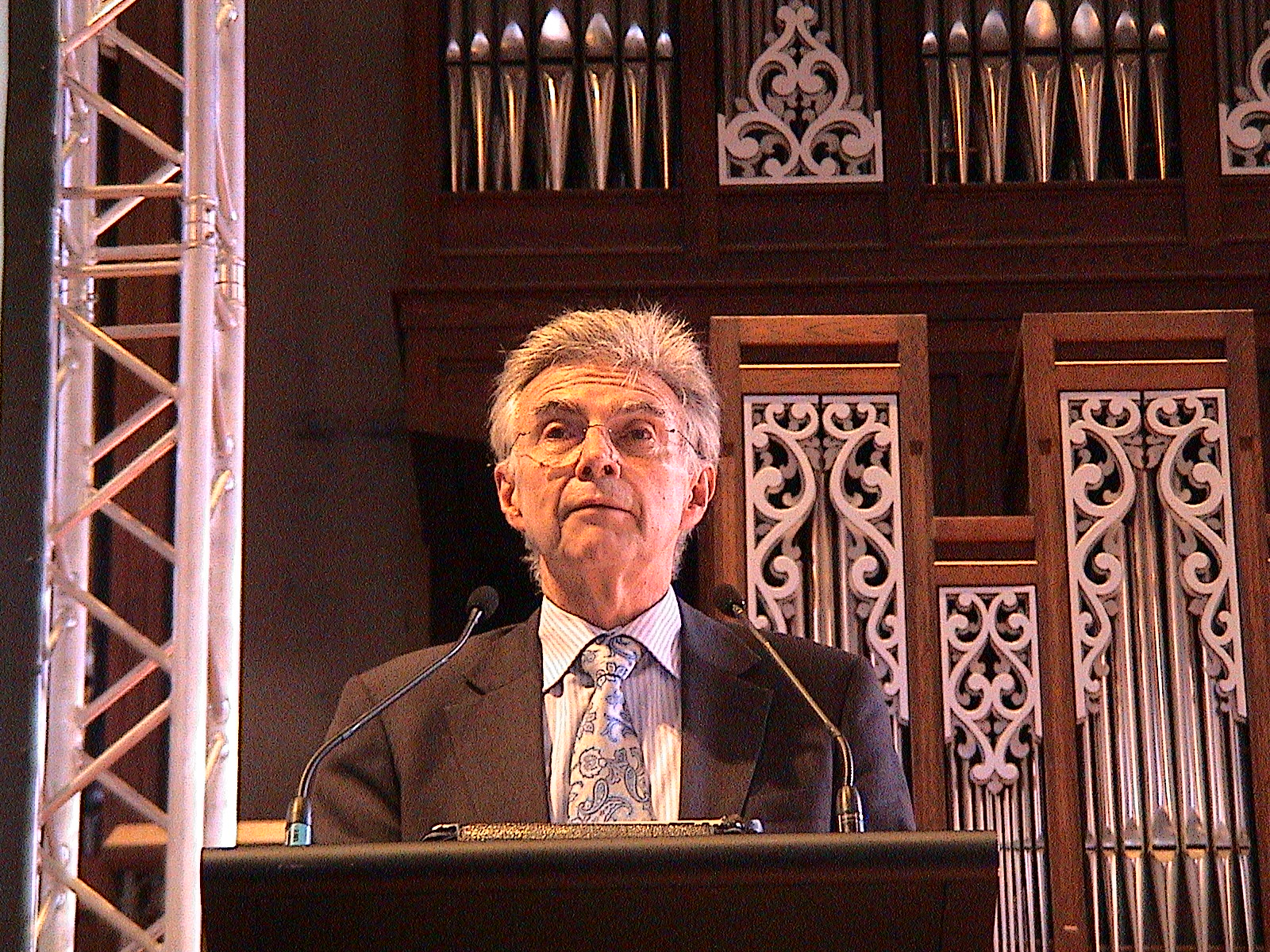
Hill opening the 2012 Museums Australia Conference at the University of Adelaide

After Jay Weatherill was sworn in as premier, Hill became Minister for Health and Ageing and Minister for the Arts on 21 October 2011. He continued to hold the portfolios of mental health and substance abuse, although his positions as Minister for Southern Suburbs and Minister Assisting the Premier in the Arts came to an end.

In 2012, Hill was a member of the EPODE International Network's Ministers' Club.

Hill resigned from the ministerial and Executive Council positions on 21 January 2013. He stated that he would become a backbencher and would not stand for re-election in 2014, because this was the logical end to his working life. Between April and November 2013, he chaired the parliamentary review committee for the Retirement Villages Act 1987.

During a November 2013 speech, Hill called for more workplace flexibility, wider role offorurses and pharmacists, and improved preventive medicine and primary care. He was also in favour of taxing carbonated beverages and debating on funding for health care and aged care.

During an address in parliament, Weatherill praised Hill's contribution to shaping the ALP's policy priorities in 2002, introducing environmental policies, and contributing to the construction of SAHMRI, the redevelopment of metropolitan hospitals, and the construction of the new RAH. Hill left the parliament on 14 March 2014, and Chris Picton took his place.

== Post-parliamentary career ==
Hill became the member of the ACH Group Board in July 2014. In June 2015, Bellberry Limited declared his inclusion into the company's Board of Directors. He also joined the University of South Australia (UniSA) Council in 2015.

Hill wrote a political memoir named "On Being a Minister: Behind the Mask," which described policy making, ministerial administration, interaction with public servants and press, campaign and new RAH. In his February 2016 review, Atkinson positively evaluated Hill's political abilities and accomplishments while criticizing some points of his narrative.

In April 2016, Hill became the independent assessor of the Stolen Generations Reparations Scheme of South Australia. The scheme had 449 applicants of whom 312 were declared eligible for compensation. Hill consulted with over 300 applicants who wanted to tell him about their experiences of being removed from their families. Releasing the report of Hill, Premier Steven Marshall highly valued his achievements and declared the compensation of additional $10,000 to each eligible applicant, thus increasing the total amount of payments up to $30,000.

Hill took up the position of Chair of South Australian Film Corporation (SAFC) on 26 April 2016. From 2017 to 2018, he also held the position of Deputy Chair of ACH Group. In 2018, he served as the Chair of South Australian Living Artists. In December 2018, Hill's tenure at the SAFC expired. He said that although he offered to extend his tenure, he accepted this decision without any political consideration.

On 19 December 2018, Hill became Deputy Chancellor of University of South Australia. On 3 May 2019, Hill was appointed the Independent Chair of Private Healthcare Australia. In the same year, he also served as Independent Chair of Goyder Institute for Water Research. Barry Hart succeeded Hill at Goyder Institute in December 2020, and the institute credited him for helping them move into their third phase.

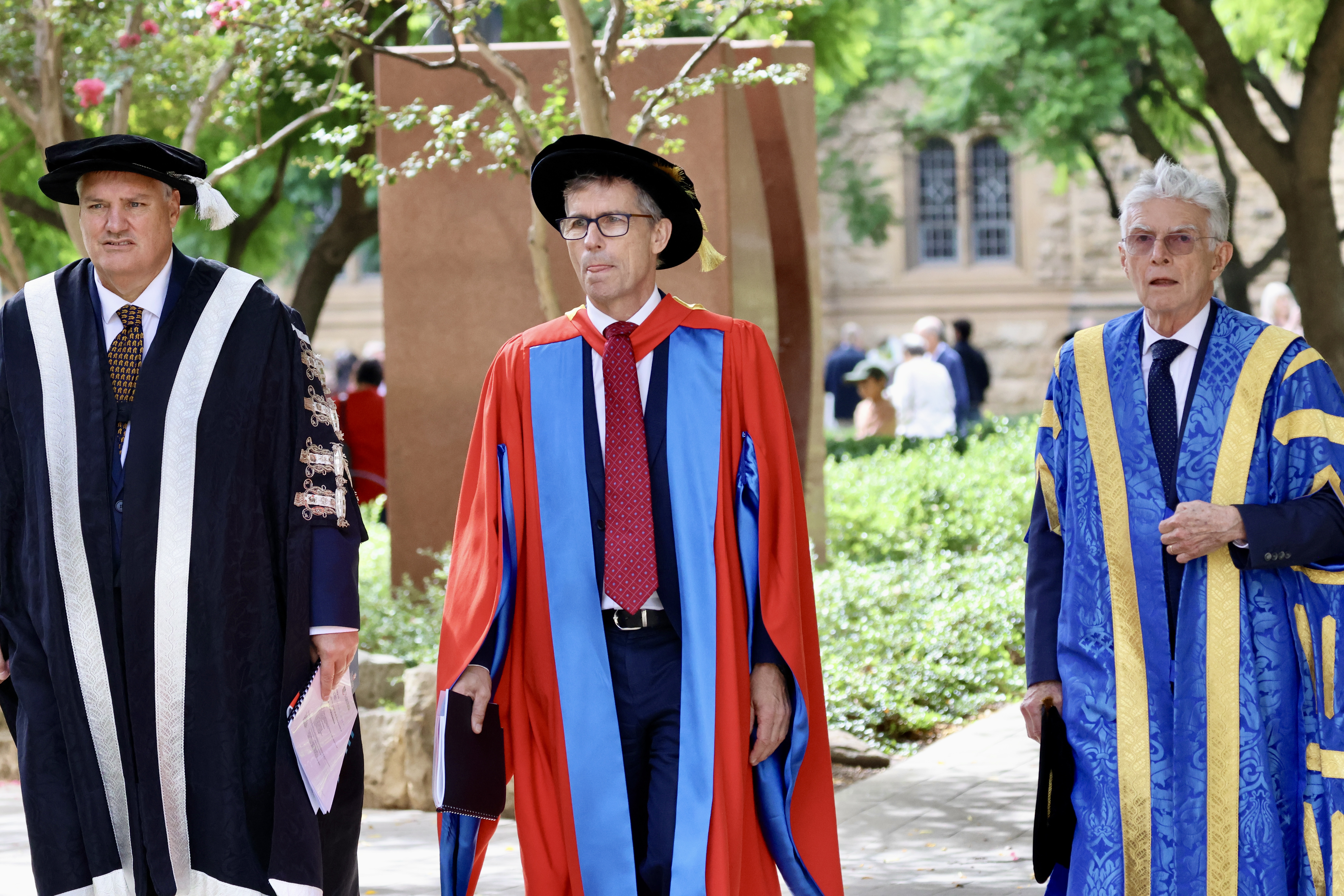
John Williams, Peter Høj and Hill at the final UofA graduation ceremonies following Høj's tenure as vice-chancellor, March 2026

Hill was a member of the Adelaide University Transition Council since it was formed on 8 March 2024 to his resignation on 2 May 2024. The UniSA Council made him the Chancellor of the university in its meeting in April 2024. Immediately afterwards, Hill replaced Pauline Carr, who resigned as the Chancellor of University of South Australia to focus on her new position as the Chancellor of Adelaide University Transition Council. In a speech he gave at the Academic Board of the university, he stressed the importance of acknowledging UniSA's accomplishments during the period of transitioning to Adelaide University. His tenure as chancellor came to an end when UniSA was officially dissolved on 31 March 2026.

== Personal life ==
Hill is married to artist and educator Andrea Dale, and they have two sons. They reside in Seaford, South Australia. His hobbies include cooking, exercising, movies, reading, and art.

Hill was listed among the Kingstonians, a supporters' club of the South Adelaide Football Club known earlier as the Vice Presidents Group. Hill has also been a patron of Southport Surf Lifesaving Club in 2012–2013.

In 2021, Hill and Dale have endowed scholarships at UniSA for young women pursuing social work, psychology, psychological science, and sociology in memory of their respective mothers, Mavis and Moira. They have been awarded membership to the university's Hetzel Group for donations exceeding $100,000.

== Honours and awards ==
The appointment of Hill as a Justice of the Peace (JP) in South Australia was done on 14 July 2011. As a result of his time in cabinet, he was permitted to retain the honorific title of "The Honourable," as gazetted on 28 March 2013. As of 2016, he was already a Fellow of the Australian Institute of Company Directors (FAICD). He was granted an honorary Doctor of the University degree from UniSA on 4 March 2026.

South Australian House of Assembly
Preceded by Lorraine Rosenberg	Member for Kaurna; 1997–2014	Succeeded by Chris Picton
Academic offices
Preceded by Pauline Carr	7th Chancellor of the University of South Australia; 2024–2026	Succeeded by Position abolished
