= Zero Waste SA =

South Australian Government organisation

Zero Waste SA was an agency of the Government of South Australia, charged with oversight of waste management within South Australia, including the promotion of waste recycling and waste minimisation. It had the goal of reducing waste to zero.
