= Jim McDowell =

Australian business executive and public servant

James White McDowell AO is a lawyer and defence sector businessman based in South Australia.

Jim McDowell AO commenced as Chair of the ASC Pty Ltd (ASC) Board on 1 January 2026, after serving as the Deputy Chair from September 2025. ASC's Board acts in the company's best interests on behalf of its sole shareholder, the Commonwealth of Australia, represented by the Department of Finance. Led by Jim McDowell, the Board exercises independent judgement in its strategic guidance and overview of ASC and its Executive.

He is a former CEO of BAE Systems Australia and BAE Systems Saudi Arabia. He was the Chief Executive of the Department of the Premier and Cabinet of the Government of South Australia from 2018, before moving to become CEO of Nova Systems, a global engineering services and technology solutions company, in November 2020. In May 2023, he was appointed Deputy Secretary Naval Building and Sustainment at the Australian Department of Defence.

== Personal life ==
McDowell went to school in Belfast, Northern Ireland and university in England. He graduated with honours in law from the University of Warwick in 1977.

Jim has an identical twin brother, John, who is the Archbishop of Armagh and Primate of All Ireland in the Anglican communion.

== Career ==
McDowell worked in legal, commercial and marketing roles with aerospace company Bombardier Shorts for 18 years after graduation. He has lived and worked in the United Kingdom, the United States, Korea, Singapore, Hong Kong, and Saudi Arabia.

In 1996 McDowell left Bombardier Shorts and joined British Aerospace in their Singapore office. Three years later, following the merger of British Aerospace and Marconi Electronic Systems, he was appointed regional managing director of BAE Systems for Asia. In March 2001 he was appointed as chief executive of BAE Systems Australia. Under his leadership, the company expanded to become Australia's largest defence firm, with more than 6,500 employees and annual sales of approximately AUD $1.7 billion. He oversaw a significant expansion of BAE's Australian operations and established the company's headquarters in Adelaide, South Australia. He ran operations from Adelaide until September 2011, when he was tasked to lead BAE Saudi Arabia.

In 2014 McDowell left BAE Systems Saudi Arabia and returned to Adelaide, marking a career shift from the private to the public sector, as CEO of the South Australian Department of the Premier and Cabinet.

On 1 January 2016, McDowell replaced Ian Gould as chancellor of the University of South Australia. McDowell had previously served on its council from 2007 and on its Business School Advisory Board and the Law School Advisory Board from 2010.

He resigned as chancellor in 2018 and became the chief executive of the Department of Premier and Cabinet.

In 2020, he became CEO of Nova Systems, based in Adelaide. In May 2023, he was appointed Deputy Secretary Naval Building and Sustainment at the Australian Department of Defence.

== Other roles ==
McDowell has served as chair on a range of boards, including the Australian Nuclear Science and Technology Organisation, where he was appointed deputy chair in March 2014. He was also chair of private company Total Construction Pty Ltd, and non-executive director of public companies Codan, Austal, and Micro – X.

In 2015, McDowell was a member of the Expert Advisory Panel on the Future Submarine Competitive Evaluation Process, formed by the Australian Government. McDowell's contract was valued at A$275,000 for 50 days' work, and included travel expenses. Concern was expressed regarding the remuneration for the advisory panel members by independent senator Nick Xenophon.

In 2017, McDowell was appointed as a director of the Adelaide Football Club. His term expired in March 2020.

McDowell was a director of the RAA, and has been a member of the Australian Strategic Policy Institute council and the council of governors at St. Peter's College.

== Honours ==
In 2019, McDowell was awarded an honorary doctorate by the University of South Australia.

On 8 June 2026, McDowell was appointed as an Officer of the Order of Australia (AO) for distinguished service to public administration, to the defence capability industry, to science and technology, and to education governance.
