= Ian Gould (geologist) =

Austrailian academic administrator

Ian Geoffrey Gould is a former Chancellor of the University of South Australia (2008–2015) and former Managing Director (Australia) of Rio Tinto Group. Gould is considered to be one of South Australia's most influential people.

== Career ==
Gould is a graduate of Sydney Technical High School and the University of Sydney. He holds a Bachelor of Science with Honours (Geology) conferred in 1967 and a PhD (Geology) conferred in 1975.

He worked as a geologist and mining professional for over 40 years, during which he held a number of diverse and senior positions in the Rio Tinto Group (formerly Conzinc RioTinto Australia) including Group Executive for Exploration and Group Executive Research & Development. In 2000, Gould retired from his executive career as Managing Director of the Adelaide-based Normandy Mining Group. He has since held a number of non-executive directorships within the resources sector, and received several accolades for his commitment to the resources industry. He was appointed Chancellor of the University of South Australia in July 2008.

He is a former chair of uranium mining company, Toro Energy. He resigned from Toro in April 2009 following his appointment as Chancellor at the university the previous year. The University of South Australia describes Gould as "a professional with long experience in governance and leadership and a comprehensive understanding of the nexus between education, innovation, the community and business."

In December 2015 Gould, retired from his position as Chancellor of the University of South Australia. He was replaced by Jim McDowell, chairman of ANSTO and former CEO of BAE Systems Australia. During his time as Chancellor, he also served as Convenor of the Universities Chancellors’ Council (UCC).

Gould supports experimentation and analysis in scientific endeavour through his Ian Gould Experimental Science Grant. The grant is offered to Honours and PhD students who seek to undertake hands on research, including the collection and analysis their own data for publication.

== Mining industry advocacy ==
Gould is deeply committed to the advancement of the mining industry in South Australia and has worked to that end through leadership positions on several government advisory boards and committees. He chairs the South Australian Minerals & Petroleum Expert Group (SAMPEG) and the CSIRO Mineral Resources Sector Advisory Committee, has previously chaired the South Australian Resources Industry Development Board and is a former member of the Economic Development Board of South Australia. In 2007 he told Ian Henschke of the ABC: "It will be the greatest concentration of known uranium resources in the world, in South Australia. We have such a large proportion of the world's known resources in this state and such a high potential to find more ... It's a technicolour paradise of spots here, where uranium has been discovered." On the topic of mining in South Australia he told The Advertiser in 2011: "We are witnessing the mining industry growing into the major plank of a balanced, strong economy based on our unique geology – demonstrated by the world class Olympic Dam resources – our expertise and the support of government."

In April 2012, Gould described the political landscape for the mining industry in South Australia while using the analogy of a football club, with the resources sector as its star player. He stated that "In SA, the club; ie the Government (and the Opposition) have gotten behind the star and openly stated that they are pro mining, albeit conditionally on his good social and environmental behaviour. In Canberra, the Federal League does not always project such clear support and the Green subcommittee is invariably anti mining." During the same speech he spoke optimistically about the Olympic Dam mine expansion, suggesting that "The longer term challenge is to use the opportunity [presented by the Olympic Dam mine expansion] to build new industries, just as Broken Hill did in the last two centuries. These are questions the Economic Development Board is currently pondering."

On 4 April 2013, Gould said of his role and responsibilities as chair of the South Australian Minerals and Petroleum Expert Group (SAMPEG) that "Our aims are to encourage investment in South Australia and advise government fearlessly – we are not a government committee or industry association. I am pleased to say that our independent view is much in line with that expressed by the Premier."

== Memberships ==
Gould is a present and former member of numerous key government advisory bodies at state and federal levels. He was appointed as a member of the Resources Industry Development Board in 2001, chair of the CSIRO Minerals Sector Advisory Committee in 2005 and Chair of South Australian Minerals and Petroleum Experts Group (SAMPEG) in 2006. Gould became a fellow of the Australian Academy of Technological Sciences and Engineering (AATSE) in 2007.

Gould is chair of the St Andrew's Hospital board, vice president of the Royal Flying Doctor Service (RFDS) Central Operations and was a member of the South Australian National Parks and Wildlife Council (2006–2007). In 2014 he held a position on the South Australian Premier's Science and Research Council.

== Honours ==
The Sir Willis Connolly Medal "for excellence in communication in the technological sciences" was awarded to Gould in 2003 by the AusIMM and Barbarians. He is a past president and fellow of the AusIMM and was awarded the AusIMM's highest honour, the Institute Medal in 2007. Gould was appointed Chancellor of the University of South Australia in 2008. At the time of his appointment, Professor Peter Høj commented: "In this new appointment we will have a Chancellor with broad and comprehensive experience across the mining and technology sectors and someone with a thorough understanding of what is required of graduates in the working world and the role of research in fostering development. That combination is more than appropriate in a State gearing up for a mining, defence and environmental science boom."

Gould responded by complimenting the university on its achievements: "Institutes such as the Ian Wark Research Institute are a marvellous success story for SA. UniSA has developed a research community that is clearly dedicated to adding value to industry."

Gould was awarded the Order of Australia (AM) in the 2011 Queen's birthday honours "for service to the mining industry, particularly as a proponent of environmental management, to education as Chancellor of the University of South Australia, and to the community."
