= List of University of Adelaide people =

This is an incomplete list of University of Adelaide people including notable alumni and staff associated with the former University of Adelaide (1874–2026) in Australia.

On 31 March 2026, the university was formally dissolved and (via a bilateral merger) transitioned into Adelaide University, also known as Tirkangkaku.

== Alumni ==
=== Business ===
- Shaun Bonett – founder of the Precision Group
- John Langdon Bonython – founding chairman of Santos
- Bruce Carter – chairman of ASC Pty Ltd
- Cheong Choong Kong – former chief executive officer of Singapore Airlines, chairman of Oversea-Chinese Banking Corporation
- Tim Cooper – managing director of Coopers Brewery
- Simon Hackett – founder of Internode (ISP)
- Tim Harcourt – economist
- Edward Holden – managing director of General Motors-Holden
- Wayne Jackson – former chief executive officer of the Australian Football League (AFL)
- Lim Siong Guan – group president of the Government of Singapore Investment Corporation
- Gillon McLachlan – chief executive officer of the AFL
- Thorburn Brailsford Robertson – pioneered insulin manufacture in Australia
- Bo Songvisava – chef and restaurateur
- John Spalvins – managing director of the Adelaide Steamship Company
- Raymond Spencer – chair of the South Australian Economic Development Board
- Neil Weste – microelectronics engineer and entrepreneur
- Philip Wollen – former vice president of Citibank; general manager at Citicorp, Philanthropist
- Danielle Wood – economist and incoming chair of the Productivity Commission
- Wan Zulkiflee – chairman of Malaysia Airlines, former president and chief executive officer of Petronas

=== Government ===
==== Heads of state ====
- Frances Adamson – governor 2021–present
- Roma Mitchell – Australia's first female judge; its first female governor 1991–1996
- Eric Neal – business leader, governor 1996–2001
- Mark Oliphant – physicist; governor 1971–1976
- Keith Seaman – Uniting Church minister; governor 1977–1982
- Hieu Van Le – lieutenant governor of South Australia 2007–2014; governor 2014–2021

==== Politicians ====
===== National leaders =====
====== Australia ======
- Julia Gillard – 27th Prime Minister of Australia (2009–2012) (attended 1979 to 1982, transferred to the University of Melbourne)

====== All other countries ======
- Peter Ong Boon Kwee – head of the Civil Service, Singapore since 2010, the Permanent Secretary of the Ministry of Finance, Singapore since 2009, and Permanent Secretary with Special Duties in the Prime Minister's Office, Singapore
- Ong Teng Cheong – 5th president of Singapore (1993–1999)
- Joseph Pairin Kitingan – 7th chief minister of Sabah, Malaysia (1985–1994)
- Adenan Satem – 5th chief minister of Sarawak, Malaysia (2014–2017)
- Abdul Taib – 4th chief minister of Sarawak, Malaysia (1981–2014); governor of Sarawak (2014–)
- Tony Tan Keng Yam – 7th president of Singapore (2011–2017); deputy prime minister of Singapore (1995–2005)

===== South Australian premiers =====
- Lynn Arnold – premier of South Australia 1992–1993
- John Bannon – premier of South Australia 1982–1992
- Henry Barwell – premier of South Australia 1920–1924
- Dean Brown – premier of South Australia 1993–1996
- Don Dunstan – premier of South Australia 1967–1968, and 1970–1979
- Rob Kerin – premier of South Australia 2001–2002
- Peter Malinauskas – premier of South Australia 2022–
- David Tonkin – premier of South Australia 1979–1982
- Jay Weatherill – premier of South Australia 2011–2018

===== Other Federal politicians =====
- Benjamin Benny – senator for South Australia (1920–1926)
- Gordon Bilney – member for Kingston (1983–1996), former minister
- Simon Birmingham – senator for South Australia (2007–), former minister
- Julie Bishop – member for Curtin (1998–), former minister
- Mark Bishop – senator for Western Australia (1996–2014)
- Nick Bolkus – senator for South Australia (1981–2005), former minister
- Mark Butler – member for Hindmarsh (2007–), current minister
- Peter Duncan – member for Makin (1984–1996), former minister
- Don Farrell – senator for South Australia (2008–2014, 2016–), current minister
- Janine Haines – senator for South Australia (1977–1978, 1981–1990)
- Sarah Hanson-Young – senator for South Australia (2008–)
- Robert Hill – senator for South Australia (1981–2006), former minister, and Permanent Representative of Australia to the United Nations
- Annette Hurley – senator for South Australia (2005–2011)
- Linda Kirk – senator for South Australia (2002–2008)
- Keith Laught – senator for South Australia (1951–1969)
- Alexander McLachlan – senator for South Australia (1926–1944), postmaster-general
- Andrew Nikolic – member for Bass (2013–2016)
- Christopher Pyne – member for Sturt (1993–2019), former minister
- Margaret Reid – senator for the Australian Capital Territory (1981–2003)
- Andrew Southcott – member for Boothby (1996–2016)
- Natasha Stott Despoja – senator for South Australia (1995–2008), Leader of the Australian Democrats (2001–2002)
- Amanda Vanstone – senator for South Australia (1984–2007), former minister, ambassador to Italy (2007–2010)
- David Vigor – senator for South Australia (1984–1987)
- Keith Wilson – senator for South Australia (1938–1944), member for Sturt (1949–1954, 1955–1966)
- Penny Wong – senator for South Australia (2002–), current minister
- Nick Xenophon – senator for South Australia (2008–2018)

===== Other state and territory politicians =====
- Adair Blain – member for the Northern Territory (1934–1949)
- Lia Finocchiaro – chief minister of the Northern Territory (2024–present)
- Pru Goward – member of the New South Wales Legislative Assembly, current minister
- Shane Stone – chief minister of the Northern Territory (1995–1999)
- Ian Wilson – member for Sturt (1966–1969, 1972–1993), former minister

===== Other politician figures =====
- David Combe – former Secretary of the Australian Labor Party
- Lynton Crosby – campaign strategist and co-founder of the Crosby Textor Group
- Lim Soo Hoon – first female Permanent Secretary of Singapore
- Raymond Lim – member of Parliament of Singapore (2001–2015), Minister for Transport
- G. Parameshwara – deputy chief minister of Karnataka
- Lockwood Smith – member of the New Zealand Parliament (1984–2013), speaker of the New Zealand House of Representatives, high commissioner of New Zealand to the United Kingdom

==== Public servants ====
- Finlay Crisp – public servant, academic and political scientist
- John Menadue – Secretary of the Department of Prime Minister and Cabinet
- Martin Parkinson – Secretary of the Department of the Treasury
- John E. Scanlon – Secretary General of CITES

===== Diplomats =====
- Richard Broinowski – Australian ambassador to Mexico (1994–1997)
- Walter Crocker – diplomat and writer
- Maurice de Rohan – South Australian agent general in London (1998–2006)
- Tim George – Australian diplomat

===== Military =====
- Brigadier Arthur Seaforth Blackburn VC, CMG, CBE – soldier and lawyer; awarded the Victoria Cross in 1916

=== Humanities ===
==== Arts ====
- Robyn Archer – performer and director
- Julian Cochran – composer
- Ruby Davy – pianist and composer
- John Dowie – painter and sculptor
- Francis Greenslade – comedian
- Robert Hannaford – realist artist
- Mark Holden – singer, actor, television personality and barrister
- Graham Jenkin – poet, composer and historian
- Graeme Koehne – composer
- Dichen Lachman – actress
- Anthony "Lehmo" Lehmann – comedian
- Lionel Logue – speech and language therapist and stage actor who successfully treated King George VI
- Gary McCaffrie – comedy writer and producer
- Shaun Micallef – comedian and writer
- Keith Michell – film and television actor
- Steve J. Spears – playwright and director
- Stephen Whittington – composer, pianist and writer on music

==== History ====
- Geoffrey Dutton – author and historian
- Anne Philomena O'Brien – author and historian
- Russel Ward – historian and author of The Australian Legend
- Graham Zanker – professor

==== Journalism and media ====
- Keith Conlon – television and radio presenter
- Annabel Crabb – political writer and commentator
- Zoe Daniel – ABC foreign correspondent
- Chris Dore – editor in chief of The Australian
- Fran Kelly – journalist and political correspondent
- Christian Kerr – political commentator and journalist
- Samantha Maiden – national political editor of News Corporation Sunday papers
- Hamish McLachlan – television sports commentator for the Seven Network
- David Penberthy – editor-in-chief of The Daily Telegraph
- Angela Pippos – ABC sports journalist
- Michael Stutchbury – editor-in-chief of The Australian Financial Review
- Anne Summers – feminist writer and commentator

==== Literature, writing and poetry ====
- Georgia Blain – author
- James Bradley – author
- John Jefferson Bray – poet and jurist
- Nancy Cato – author
- Garry Disher – author
- Brian Elliott – academic
- Anna Goldsworthy – writer and classical pianist
- Kerryn Goldsworthy – writer and critic
- Peter Goldsworthy – author
- Max Harris – Angry Penguins poet and publisher
- Rex Ingamells – poet and founder of the Jindyworobak Movement
- Joe Penhall – playwright
- Colin Thiele – writer
- Sean Williams – science fiction author

==== Philosophy and theology ====
- David Chalmers – philosopher and Federation Fellow
- Margaret Somerville – ethicist

=== Judiciary and the law ===
- Amanda Banton – lawyer
- John Basten – justice of the New South Wales Court of Appeal
- Richard Blackburn – former chief justice of the Australian Capital Territory
- Catherine Branson – former president of the Australian Human Rights Commission and justice of the Federal Court of Australia
- John Bray – chief justice of the Supreme Court of South Australia, poet and classicist
- James Crawford – legal academic; judge of the International Court of Justice (2014)
- Claudia Cream – first Asian woman to graduate in law in South Australia
- Bill Denny – Attorney-General of South Australia
- John Doyle – chief justice of the Supreme Court of South Australia
- John Finnis – legal scholar and philosopher
- Regina Graycar – emeritus professor of Law School, University of Sydney
- Hermann Homburg – attorney-general of South Australia
- Elliott Johnston – Communist activist and justice of the Supreme Court of South Australia
- Len King – South Australian attorney-general; chief justice of the Supreme Court of South Australia
- Robert Lawson – Attorney-General of South Australia
- Chris Kourakis – chief justice of the Supreme Court of South Australia
- Bruce Lander – South Australia's first Independent Commissioner Against Corruption
- G. C. Ligertwood – judge of the Supreme Court of South Australia
- Brian Martin – chief justice of the Supreme Court of the Northern Territory
- Robin Millhouse – lawyer, politician, justice of the Supreme Court of South Australia; chief justice of Kiribati and Nauru
- Roma Mitchell – lawyer, first female Queen's Counsel in Australia (1962); justice of the Supreme Court of South Australia; first female superior court judge in the British Commonwealth (1965)
- George Murray – chief justice of South Australia
- Mellis Napier – chief justice of the Supreme Court of South Australia
- Rosemary Owens – dean of Law at the University of Adelaide Law School
- Angas Parsons – former judge of the Supreme Court of South Australia and former attorney-general of South Australia
- Geoffrey Reed – judge in the Supreme Court of South Australia; the first director-general of ASIO
- Len Roberts-Smith – former justice of the Supreme Court of Western Australia
- Paul Rofe – former South Australian director of Public Prosecutions
- Colin Rowe – attorney-general of South Australia
- Reginald Rudall – attorney-general of South Australia
- Chris Sumner – attorney-general of South Australia
- Margaret White – first female judge of the Supreme Court of Queensland

=== Medicine and science ===
==== Nobel laureates ====
- William Lawrence Bragg – physicist, Nobel laureate with his father (William Henry Bragg) "for their services in the analysis of crystal structure by means of X-rays"
- Howard Florey – pharmacologist, Nobel laureate (Physiology or Medicine, 1945) "for the discovery of penicillin and its curative effect in various infectious diseases"
- Robin Warren – pathologist, Nobel laureate (Physiology or Medicine, 2005), for the "discovery of the bacterium Helicobacter pylori and its role in gastritis and peptic ulcer disease"

==== Medicine ====
- Raymond Begg – orthodontist
- Henry Fry – physician and anthropologist
- John Charles Hargrave – surgeon and leprosy expert
- Basil Hetzel – authority on iodine deficiency
- Rory Hume – dentist
- Tareq Kamleh – doctor who joined Islamic State of Iraq and the Levant
- Loretta Marron OAM – CEO of Friends of Science in Medicine
- Helen Marshall – vaccinologist
- Helen Mayo – pioneer in women's and children's health
- Henry Simpson Newland – surgeon
- Philip Nitschke – pro euthanasia advocate
- Nicola Spurrier – SA Chief Public Health Officer

==== Science and mathematics ====
- Herbert Basedow – anthropologist, geologist, politician, explorer and medical practitioner
- Warren Bonython – conservationist, explorer, author, and chemical engineer
- Keith Briggs – mathematician
- Henry Brose – physicist
- Helen Caldicott – physician and anti-nuclear advocate
- Herbert Condon – ornithologist
- Constance Davey – psychologist
- Margaret M. Davies – herpetologist
- Anthony C. Hearn – computer scientist
- Tim Jarvis – environmental scientist
- Norman Jolly – forest researcher
- Rodney Jory – physicist
- Abdul Karim – soil scientist
- Aubrey Lewis – first professor of psychiatry at the Institute of Psychiatry
- Jim May – chemical engineer and metallurgist
- Trevor McDougall – physical oceanographer and climate researcher
- Brian Morris – molecular biologist
- Keith Nugent – physicist
- Mark Oliphant – nuclear physicist
- Ian Plimer – professor and global warming critic
- Hugh Possingham – mathematical ecologist
- Lindsay Pryor – botanist and founding designer of the Australian National Botanic Gardens
- Enid Lucy Robertson – systematic botanist
- Roy Robinson – forest researcher
- Nagendra Kumar Singh – National Professor, Dr. B.P.Pal Chair, Indian Council of Agricultural Research
- H. Catherine W. Skinner – geologist and mineralogist
- Reg Sprigg – geologist and conservationist; discovered Ediacara biota
- Ted Strehlow – Australian anthropologist
- Andy Thomas – first Australia-born professional astronaut to enter space
- Cecil Edgar Tilley – petrologist and geologist
- Norman Tindale – Australian anthropologist, archaeologist, entomologist and ethnologist

=== Sports ===
- Max Basheer – football administrator
- Leonidas Bott – cricketer
- Matthew Cowdrey – swimmer; Australia's most successful Paralympian
- Collier Cudmore – Olympic rower and gold medal winner
- Albert Curtis – tennis player
- Hannah Davis – Olympic medal winning sprint canoer
- Moya Dodd – soccer official and player
- Annette Edmondson – Olympic cyclist and bronze medal winner at 2012 Summer Olympics
- Jaime Fernandez – three time Olympic rower in the men's eight (1992, 1996 and 2000), winning a silver medal in 2000
- David Fitzsimons – middle-distance runner
- Amber Halliday – rower
- Juliet Haslam – hockey player and Olympic gold medalist
- Marguerite Houston – Olympic rower
- James McRae – world champion and Olympic medal winning rower
- Chris Morgan – rower, world champion, and Olympian
- Darren Ng – professional basketball player for the Adelaide 36ers
- Kate Slatter – Olympic rower; won gold at Atlanta 1996 and a silver at Sydney 2000
- Tim Willoughby – Olympic rower

== Administration (1874–2026) ==
=== Chancellors ===
Order	Chancellors	Term start	Term end	Time in office	Notes
1	Sir Richard Hanson	1874	1876	1–2 years	
2	Dr Augustus Short	1876	1883	6–7 years	
3	Sir Samuel Way PC	1883	1916	32–33 years	
4	Sir George Murray KCMG	1916	1942	25–26 years	
5	Sir William Mitchell KCMG	1942	1948	5–6 years	
6	Sir Mellis Napier KCMG	1948	1961	12–13 years	
7	Sir George Ligertwood KC	1961	1966	4–5 years	
8	Sir Kenneth Wills KBE, MC, KStJ, ED	1966	1968	1–2 years	
9	John Jefferson Bray AC, QC	1968	1983	14–15 years	
10	Dame Roma Mitchell AC, DBE, CVO, QC	1983	1990	6–7 years	
11	WO Dr William Faulding (Bill) Scammell AO, CBE	1991	1997	5–6 years	
12	Bruce Phillip Webb AM	1998	2000	1–2 years	
n/a	Brian Croser AO (acting)	February 2000	March 2000	1–2 months	
13	Robert Champion de Crespigny AC	2000	2004	3–4 years	
n/a	Brian Croser (2) (acting)	June 2004	June 2004	0–1 months	
14	John von Doussa AO, QC, KC	2004	2010	5–6 years	
15	Robert Hill AC	2010	2014	3–4 years	
n/a	Di Davidson OAM (acting)	July 2014	November 2014	3–4 months	
16	Rear Admiral Kevin Scarce AC, CSC, RANR	1 December 2014	4 May 2020	5 years, 155 days	
17	Catherine Branson AC, QC, KC	14 July 2020	31 March 2026	5 years, 260 days	

=== Vice-chancellors ===
Order	Vice-chancellors	Term start	Term end	Time in office	Notes
1	The Rt. Rev'd Dr Augustus Short	1874	1876	1–2 years	
2	The Rt Hon. Sir Samuel Way	1876	1883	6–7 years	
3	The Rev. W. Roby Fletcher	1883	1887	3–4 years	
4	The Ven. George Henry Farr	1887	1893	5–6 years	
5	John Anderson Hartley	1893	1896	2–3 years	
6	Dr William Barlow	1896	1915	18–19 years	
7	Sir George; J. R. Murray	1915	1916	0–1 years	
8	Sir William Mitchell	1916	1942	25–26 years	
n/a	Edward Rennie (acting)	January 1924; November 1924; March 1926	April 1924; December 1924; June 1926	9–10 months (total)	
n/a	Sir Robert William Chapman (acting)	February 1928; November 1929; March 1930; June 1932; January 1933; November 1934	January 1929; December 1929; April 1930; June 1932; February 1933; January 1935	1–2 years (total)	
9	Sir Angas Parsons	1942	1945	2–3 years	
10	John McKellar Stewart	1945	1948	2–3 years	
11	Albert Percival (Jimmy) Rowe	1948	1958	9–10 years	
12	Sir Henry Bolton Basten	1958	1967	8–9 years	
13	Instr. Lt. Sir Geoffrey Badger	1967	1977	9–10 years	
n/a	CAPT James (Jim) Melville (acting)	July 1973; June 1974	August 1973; August 1974	4–5 months (total)	
n/a	LT Eric Stephen Barnes (acting)	October 1975	October 1975	0–1 months	
14	Donald Richard (Don) Stranks	1977	1986	8–9 years	
n/a	Peter Helmut Glow (acting)	August 1983	August 1983	0–1 months	
n/a	WGCDR; C. Angas Hurst (acting)	February 1985	March 1985	1–2 months	
n/a	Kevin McLeod Marjoribanks (acting)	August 1986	May 1987	9–10 months	
15	Kevin Marjoribanks (2)	1987	1993	5–6 years	
16	Gavin Brown	1994	1996	1–2 years	
17	Mary O'Kane	1997	2001	3–4 years	
18	Cliff Blake (interim)	2001	2002	0–1 years	
19	James McWha	2002	2012	9–10 years	
20	Warren Bebbington	2012	2017	4–5 years	
21	Michael J. (Mike) Brooks (interim)	April 2017	January 2018	8–9 months	
22	Peter Rathjen	8 January 2018	20 July 2020	2 years, 194 days	
23	Mike Brooks (2) (interim)	4 May 2020	12 February 2021	284 days	
24	Peter Høj	8 February 2021	February 2026	5 years	

== Governance (1958–2026) ==
=== Deputy Chancellors ===
Deputy Chancellor	Commenced	Concluded	Notes	Ref.
PTE Sir George Coutts Ligertwood	1958	1961	Position established	
BRIG Sir Kenneth Agnew Wills	1961	1966		
Office vacant	October 1966	April 1968		
The Rev. W. Frank Hambly (Note: Born William Frank Hambly; known as W. Frank or simply Frank Hambly.)	1968	1971		
Dame Roma Mitchell	1972	1978	Continuous service in DC roles: 1972–82	
Dame Roma Mitchell (2) (as Senior Deputy Chancellor)	1978	1982		
CAPT Dr; E. Harry Medlin	1978	1983	Continuous service in DC roles: 1978–97	
Dr Harry Medlin (2) (as Senior Deputy Chancellor)	1984	1996		
Dr Harry Medlin (3) (as Acting Deputy Chancellor / Emeritus Senior Deputy Chancellor)	1997	1997		
CAPT; Dr Sam Jacobs	1984	1993		
MAJ Dr Mervyn Keith Smith CBE	1994	1997		
Dr Irvine James (Jim) Bettison (as Senior Deputy Chancellor)	1997	1999		
Janine Haines	1997	1999		
Brian Croser	1999	2006	Served concurrently as Acting Chancellor in 2000 & 2004	
N. Ross Adler	2007	2009		
Pamela Martin	2010	2012		
Dianne Davidson	2013	2016	Served concurrently as Acting Chancellor in 2014	
Catherine Branson	2017	2020		
David Hill	2020	2022		
Kenneth Graham Williams	2022	2024		
Juliet Helena Brown OAM FAICD	2024	2026	Position disestablished; formation of Adelaide University.	

== Faculty ==
=== Nobel laureates ===
- Sir William Bragg – physicist, Nobel laureate (Physics, 1915) with his son William Lawrence Bragg "for their services in the analysis of crystal structure by means of X-rays"
- J. M. Coetzee – acclaimed South African novelist and Nobel laureate (Literature, 2003); retired to Adelaide and honorary visiting research fellow in the Discipline of English

=== Law ===
- Leo Blair – father of British Prime Minister Tony Blair; law lecturer at the University of Adelaide while Tony was a child
- William Jethro Brown – professor of law
- Hilary Charlesworth – feminist international law scholar
- Norval Morris – U.S. law professor
- Marcia Neave – judge of the Supreme Court of Victoria
- D. P. O'Connell – international law professor
- John Salmond – professor of law and judge of the Supreme Court of New Zealand

=== Science ===
==== Engineering ====
- Adrian Cheok – electrical engineer, roboticist
- Peng Shi – engineer
- George Karolyi – electrical engineer and parapsychology researcher; made early spectral measurements of light emitted by human skin

==== Natural sciences ====
- Noel Benson – geologist
- Lawrence A. Frakes – geologist and palaeoclimatologist
- Martin Glaessner – geologist and palaeontologist
- Victor Gostin – geologist
- Maciej Henneberg – physical anthropologist, anatomist
- Walter Howchin – geologist
- Arthur Mills Lea – entomologist
- Cecil Madigan – explorer and geologist
- Sir Douglas Mawson – Antarctic explorer and geologist
- Ian Plimer – geologist and noted global warming critic
- Ralph Tate – botanist and geologist
- Charles Rowland Twidale – geomorphologist
- Michael J. Tyler – herpetologist
- Frederic Wood Jones – naturalist and anthropologist

==== Mathematicians ====
- Keith Briggs – mathematician, formerly on the staff of the Physics Department
- Gavin Brown – mathematician, former vice chancellor of Adelaide and Sydney Universities
- Charles E. M. Pearce – applied mathematician
- Renfrey Potts – Adelaide's first professor of applied mathematics
- George Szekeres – mathematician known for the Erdős–Szekeres theorem
- Ernie Tuck – applied mathematician
- Mathai Varghese – pure mathematician, Elder Professor of Mathematics, Australian Laureate Fellow (2018)

==== Physicists ====
- Derek Abbott – physicist and engineer; pioneered the first terahertz radiation (T-ray) program in Australia; led the early development of a branch of game theory known as Parrondo's paradox; cracked the Somerton Man case
- Rod Crewther – physicist; former PhD student of the Nobel prize winner Murray Gell-Mann
- Sir Kerr Grant – Elder professor of physics 1911–1948
- Bert Green – former PhD student of the Nobel Laureate Max Born; the "G" in "BBGKY"
- Kenneth G. McCracken – physicist and former director of CSIRO
- Tanya Monro – physicist and Federation Fellow (2008)
- Albert Percival Rowe – vice-chancellor, physicist; previously radar pioneer in Britain
- Anthony William Thomas – Elder professor of physics; South Australian Scientist of the Year 2014

=== Medicine ===
- Caroline Crowther – professor of Women's and Children's Health
- Edward Charles Stirling – physiologist, politician and advocate for women's suffrage
- Sir Joseph Cooke Verco – physician and conchologist

=== Humanities ===
- Neal Blewett – academic, politician and diplomat
- Tristram Cary – composer of the Dalek theme tune for Doctor Who
- Brian Castro – novelist
- Robert Champion de Crespigny – industrialist
- Alexander Downer – former Minister for Foreign Affairs
- Keith Hancock – historian
- Graeme Hugo – demographer and Federation Fellow (2002)
- Ken Inglis – journalist and historian
- Frank Cameron Jackson – philosopher
- Jill Jones – poet
- Charles Jury – poet
- Gavan McCormack – orientalist
- Sir Leslie Melville – inaugural professor of economics at age 27; later vice-chancellor of the Australian National University
- Sir William Mitchell – philosopher
- Sir Archibald Grenfell Price – historian and politician
- George Rudé – Marxist historian
- J. J. C. Smart – philosopher
- J. I. M. Stewart – novelist
- Randolph Stow – novelist
- Hugh Stretton – historian and sociologist
- Andrew Taylor – poet
- Bryceson Treharne - composer
- Ghil'ad Zuckermann – linguist

==== Other ====
- Barry Brook – climate scientist and advocate of nuclear power
- Adrian Cheok – electrical engineer, roboticist
- Alan Cooper – ancient DNA expert and Federation Fellow (2004)
- Paul Davies – professor of Natural Philosophy, Templeton Prize winner (1995)
- Guy Debelle – economist and former deputy governor of the Reserve Bank of Australia
- Tim Flannery – palaeontologist, Australian of the Year
- Fay Gale – geographer; vice-chancellor of University of Western Australia (1990–1997)
- Elizabeth Grant – architect and anthropologist
- Geoff Harcourt – economist
- Peng Shi – engineer
- Peter Sutton – anthropologist
- Riccardo Tossani – Italo-Australian architect
