= Kevin Scarce =

Australian naval officer (born 1952)

Rear Admiral The Honourable Kevin Scarce AC CSC
- Scarce in 2026

16th Chancellor of the University of Adelaide
- In office 1 December 2014 – 4 May 2020
- Deputy: Di Davidson (2014–2016); Catherine Branson (2016–2020)
- Preceded by: Robert Hill; Di Davidson (acting)
- Succeeded by: Catherine Branson

34th Governor of South Australia
- In office 8 August 2007 – 1 September 2014
- Monarch: Elizabeth II
- Premier: Mike Rann (2007–2011); Jay Weatherill (2011–2014)
- Lieutenant: Hieu Van Le (2007–2014); Brenda Wilson (2014)
- Preceded by: Marjorie Jackson-Nelson
- Succeeded by: Hieu Van Le

Personal details
- Born: Kevin John Scarce; 4 May 1952 (age 74) Toorak Gardens, South Australia, Australia
- Spouse: Elizabeth Taylor (m. 1975)
- Children: 2
- Education: University of New South Wales; National War College; University of New England
- Profession: Naval officer

Military service
- Allegiance: Australia
- Branch/service: Royal Australian Navy
- Years of service: 1968–2004
- Rank: Rear admiral
- Unit: HMAS Sydney; HMAS Vendetta; HMAS Yarra; HMAS Duchess; HMAS Melbourne; HMAS Perth
- Commands: HMAS Cerberus (1995–1997); Naval Training Command (1997–1998); HMAS Cerberus (1997–1998); Support Command Australia – Navy (1999)
- Battles/wars: Vietnam War

Rear Admiral Kevin John Scarce (born 4 May 1952) is a retired Royal Australian Navy rear admiral who served as the 34th governor of South Australia from 2007 to 2014 and as chancellor of the University of Adelaide from 2014 to 2020. He led the state's Nuclear Fuel Cycle Royal Commission from 2015 to 2016.

Scarce was born in Toorak Gardens, and spent his childhood years in Woomera and Elizabeth. He joined the Royal Australian Naval College in 1968, underwent sea training on board HMAS Sydney during resupply of troops to Vietnam in 1971. He became an expert in naval logistics and served as a commander of HMAS Cerberus between 1995 and 1997 and was made rear admiral in 1999. He occupied a number of top positions in the Defence Materiel Organisation, but left the navy in 2004. Working as the head of the Defence Unit in the South Australian government, he headed the team which helped ASC Pty Ltd get the contract for the construction of three Hobart-class destroyers in Adelaide.

Scarce was succeeded by Marjorie Jackson-Nelson as governor on 8 August 2007. During his tenure as governor, he initiated the Governor's Multicultural Awards with the lieutenant-governor Hieu Van Le and acted several times as the administrator of the Commonwealth while the governor-general was out of the country. Hieu Van Le succeeded him on 1 September 2014.

Scarce became the chancellor of the University of Adelaide in December 2014. He headed the royal commission that considered the potential role of South Australia in the nuclear fuel cycle. The commission recommended that South Australia should seek an international facility for the storage and disposal of spent nuclear fuel and other radioactive waste, contingent on the support of the general population and the host community. Scarce was the chairman of the Adelaide Oval Stadium Management Authority from 2018 to 2022.

== Early life and education ==
Kevin John Scarce was born on 4 May 1952 in Toorak Gardens, South Australia. He spent part of his childhood in Woomera, where his father, John Scarce, worked in weapons research. Scarce and his family then moved to Elizabeth, where he attended Elizabeth East Primary School and Elizabeth High School. He joined the Cub Scouts while growing up in Elizabeth.

At Elizabeth High School, Scarce played cricket as a wicket-keeper in partnership with Steve Davis, who would later become an international umpire. Both their fathers played cricket for the Weapons Research Establishment Cricket Club.

Scarce spent some of his childhood in Woomera and Adelaide, where his father worked researching weapons. When he was around 14 years old, Scarce started the Navy selection process through the recommendation of his father.

Vehicles of the 3rd Battalion, Royal Australian Regiment, approach HMAS Sydney off Vũng Tàu in October 1971

Under the influence of his father, who suggested him to take a naval career, Scarce started the officer selection process at the age of 14 years old. At the age of 15, he was accepted to Royal Australian Naval College in HMAS Creswell of Jervis Bay as a cadet midshipman in 1968. In 1971, when he was still a cadet, he took part in the sea course in HMAS Sydney to Vietnam War resupplying in Vũng Tàu.

Scarce graduated in 1972. Scarce won the Farncomb Cup for the best all-rounder in cricket, the Morgan Trophy for the best batsman and the Governor-General's Cup for the best individual sportsperson performance. He also played for the college's first XVIII Australian rules football team.

== Naval career ==
=== Sea service and staff postings (1973–1987) ===
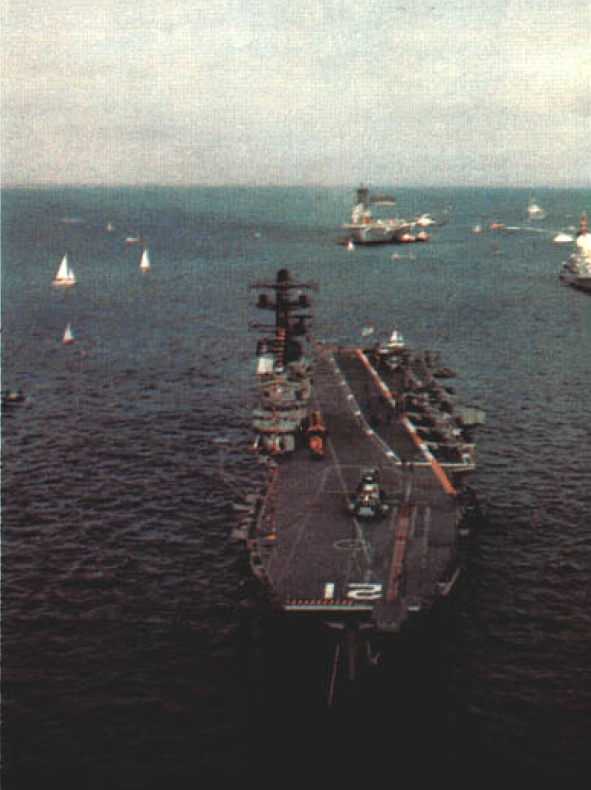
HMAS Melbourne at the Silver Jubilee Fleet Review at Spithead in 1977

In 1973, Scarce went on posting to the United Kingdom as a sub-lieutenant to undertake advanced training with the Royal Navy. On his return from there, he attended professional supply courses and was stationed on ships such as HMAS Vendetta, Yarra and Duchess. He was made lieutenant in 1975 and sent to HMAS Watson based in Sydney. In 1977, he served on the aircraft carrier HMAS Melbourne and participated in the Silver Jubilee Naval Review at Spithead. After this, he joined the Royal Australian Navy Staff College Project, which initiated the navy's first staff course in 1979.

Scarce joined the naval attaché's staff at the Australian embassy in Washington, D.C. in 1979. In December 1981, he received his promotion to lieutenant commander, and in 1982 he returned to Australia. Following additional training, he worked as a supply officer on board the HMAS Perth. In June 1985, he received the rank of commander, after which he served as an officer in the Directorate of Service Requirements – Navy at Navy Office, Canberra. In 1987, he worked as a supply officer at HMAS Albatross.

=== Senior command and logistics (1990–2004) ===
Scarce attained his master's degree in management economics at the University of New South Wales in 1990. The following year, he attained the rank of captain, serving as fleet supply officer and chief staff officer support at Fleet Headquarters. Subsequently, Scarce acquired his master's degree in national security strategy at the National War College in Washington, D.C. before commanding HMAS Cerberus from 1995 to 1997.

Scarce was the commander of HMAS Cerberus between 1995 and 1997. In 1997, Scarce was elevated to the rank of commodore and served as Flag Officer Naval Training Command between 1997 and 1998. In 1998, he graduated with a Bachelor of Financial Administration from the University of New England.

Subsequently, in 1999, Scarce was made Commodore Logistics Support – Navy. Upon being elevated to the rank of rear admiral in December 1999, Scarce took up the appointment of Support Commander Australia – Navy, which is based in Melbourne. From 2000 to 2003, he served as Head Maritime Systems in the Defence Materiel Organisation (DMO).

After the retirement of Mick Roche, Scarce served as the acting Under Secretary Defence Materiel from 18 August 2003. He served in this capacity until 11 February 2004 when he retired from the navy. As acting under secretary, he oversaw defence procurement and appeared before parliamentary committees to answer questions about project costs and management.

== Defence industry career (2004–2006) ==
From 2004 to 2005, Scarce served as the chief executive of the South Australian Government Defence Unit, whose objective was to develop the defence industry within the state. Additionally, he was the chairman of the Defence Industry Advisory Board.

HMAS Hobart (afloat) and Brisbane (in dock) at Osborne Naval Shipyard, in 2016

Scarce spearheaded the state government's effort in backing ASC Shipbuilder's proposal to construct three air warfare destroyers in Osborne. The government's offer in supporting the bid included an investment of A$250 million in infrastructure, training, and recruitment. On 31 May 2005, the Howard government chose ASC Shipbuilder as the preferred shipbuilder for the $6 billion project.

Scarce joined the board of the Port Adelaide Maritime Corporation in 2006, a corporation that was set up for the implementation of the state's commitment to shipbuilding infrastructure and skills. During his appearance before the Senate in April 2006 as part of an inquiry into naval shipbuilding in Australia, he spoke about the importance of procurement planning in order to keep the shipbuilding industry skills pool alive.

== Governor of South Australia ==
=== Appointment and first term (2007–2011) ===
Premier Mike Rann appointed Scarce as Governor of South Australia in March 2007. The appointment was made official on 3 May, and the swearing in ceremony took place on 8 August, succeeding Marjorie Jackson-Nelson. Lieutenant Governor Hieu Van Le was sworn in on 31 August. Scarce supported an Australian republic during his tenure as governor.

Scarce served as the chief scout for Scouts South Australia between 2007 and 2014 and later on became its patron. He appeared in around 900 public functions annually while serving as the governor and was also a patron of Novita Children's Services. In 2008, Scarce took up the position of patron for Debating SA and in conjunction with Le created the Governor's Multicultural Awards to honour South Australians for their contribution to multiculturalism.

By July 2007, he also chaired Foundation Daw Park, which raised funds for medical research benefiting veterans and older Australians.

In January 2009, Scarce officially opened TPI House, the new home of the TPI Association of South Australia, which caters to disabled veterans. In September, he officially opened the exhibit named Turkic World: From Crimea to Australia, presented by the Turkic Peoples Association TURAN at the Migration Museum in Adelaide. In November, Scarce attended the official opening of the Gums War Memorial Garden in Campbelltown, commemorating Australian service and those who have lost their loved ones during military service and peacekeeping missions.

On 25 March 2010, Scarce administered the swearing-in ceremony of Rann for his third term as premier in Government House. Rann took his oath using a Polish language Bible that he gave afterwards to the Polish Hill River Church Museum. In his Proclamation Day message in December, Scarce made a call for showing mercy to the asylum seekers detained in the Inverbrackie Detention Centre. On 21 October 2011, Scarce swore in Jay Weatherill as South Australia's 45th premier replacing Rann.

=== Term extension and Commonwealth duties (2012–2013) ===
Hannaford's sculpture of Simpson and his donkey in Angas Gardens, 2026

Also in February 2012, Scarce unveiled a sculpture by Robert Hannaford in the Angas Gardens commemorating Australian Defence Force healthcare personnel. The statue featured John Simpson Kirkpatrick and his donkey bearing an injured soldier from Gallipoli. On 13 February, he received a two-year extension of his term until 2014. Weatherill commended Scarce for his interaction with the state's citizens and for his efforts to make the Government House open to the general public. Scarce presided over the Year 12 Merit ceremony at Government House as well as one sitting of the South Australian Parliament during which he set out the Weatherill government's agenda.

Scarce took over the duties of administrator of the Commonwealth on 19 May 2012 during the absence of Governor-General Quentin Bryce in Timor-Leste and on 30 May upon her departure to Cyprus and the United Kingdom. On 7 June, Scarce along with his wife, unveiled the 43rd Infantry Battalion memorial in Adelaide's Pathway of Honour.

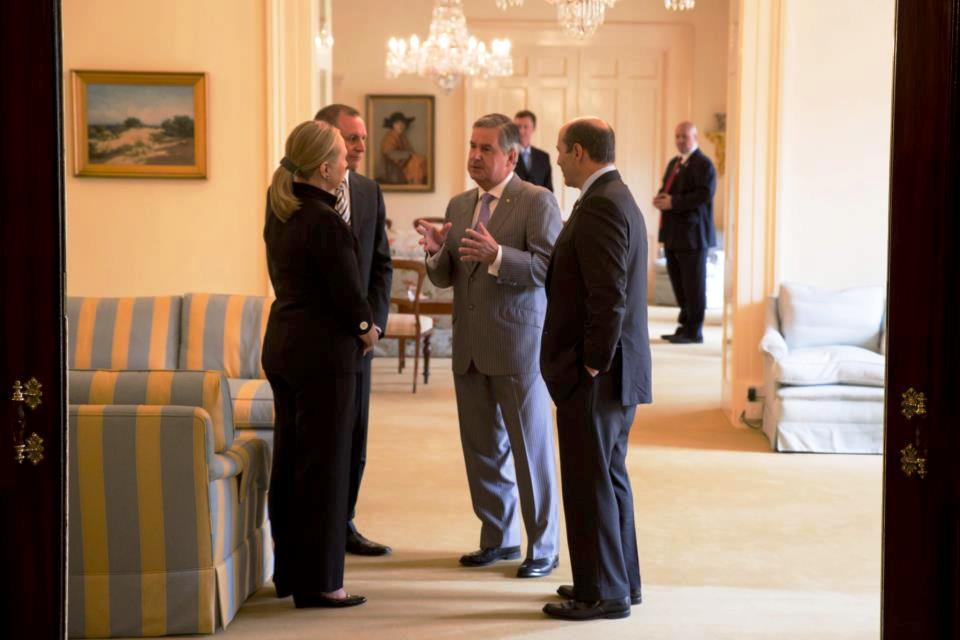
(L–R): US Secretary of State Clinton, Weatherill, and Scarce at Government House, 15 November 2012

On 7 November 2012, Scarce, along with his wife and the Deputy Premier John Rau, received Prince Charles and Duchess Camilla at Adelaide Airport. They were attending a reception at Government House during their visit. Also, in the latter part of that month, he met Hillary Clinton, US Secretary of State, at Government House. Scare once again took charge of the Commonwealth on 4 November 2013, after Bryce left for Myanmar. On 8 November, he presided over the Federal Executive Council and held a reception for the widows of Canberra Legacy Association at Government House, Canberra.

=== Final year and succession (2014) ===
On 23 March 2014, after an election resulting in neither main political party having a majority, Weatherill provided Scarce with his agreement with independent member Geoff Brock. Brock had promised to back a Labor minority government on confidence and supply grounds. He and Rau, the acting premier, greeted Prince William, and his wife Catherine, on 23 April at RAAF Base Edinburgh. A civic reception was organised by Scarce for the royal couple at the Playford Civic Centre in Elizabeth.

On 22 May, Scarce released South Australian letters patent, appointing Dyson Heydon to undertake the Royal Commission into Trade Union Governance and Corruption in South Australia. On 31 May, a notice was released confirming the granting by Queen Elizabeth II of authority for previous, current, and future governors of South Australia to style themselves "The Honourable." This applied to Scarce in his subsequent years. On 2 June, Scarce and his wife hosted Governor-General Peter Cosgrove and his wife at Government House, as Peter launched Ashley Mallett's book The Diggers' Doctor.

On 23 July, Scarce once again took control of the Commonwealth administration following the departure of Cosgrove to the Netherlands for the repatriation of victims of the Malaysia Airlines Flight 17. Meetings of the Federal Executive Council were chaired by him in Canberra on 1 and 4 August. On 4 August, he also participated in the service held at the Australian War Memorial marking the centenary of the beginning of the First World War.

On 15 August, Scarce issued letters patent appointing Margaret Nyland, a retired justice of the Supreme Court of South Australia, to lead the Child Protection Systems Royal Commission.

Le administered the oaths of office on 1 September 2014, succeeding Scarce as the 35th governor of South Australia.

== Post-governorship career ==
=== University and public roles (2014–2015) ===
Following his tenure at Government House in 2014, Scarce was appointed president of Novita Children's Services in November, after being its patron for seven years. In addition, he became a member of the Cancer Council South Australia board on 1 November and chairman of that organization in the same month.

Scarce was named chancellor of the University of Adelaide (UofA), becoming its 16th chancellor on 1 December 2014, following Robert Hill. He gave the Flinders University's Investigator Lecture on 24 November at the Adelaide Festival Centre. This lecture was part of Shaping the Future of South Australia, a program that the university claimed Scarce had instigated. He urged for a commitment to Australian shipbuilding in the Abbott government, because such commitment would create high-tech manufacturing jobs as Holden was closing down local manufacturing operations. Scarce also urged for discussion on the state's nuclear industry options.

Scarce became part of the board of Seeley International on 8 December 2014 and the Coopers Brewery Foundation's honorary Board of Governors on 9 December. The BankSA Advisory Board was joined by Scarce on 15 January 2015.

In 2015, Scarce chaired deliberations of the university council on cutting down the number of members on the council. On 24 August, the council authorised him and vice-chancellor Warren Bebbington to have talks on the proposed legislative changes with the state government. Scarce consulted the elected members of the council and met with the National Tertiary Education Union in August 2016. Scarce also addressed cuts in federal funding proposed in October 2016 that could adversely affect Children's University Australia and deprive disadvantaged children of education.

During the discussion on the Statutes Amendment (Universities) Bill on 28 September 2017, minister Ian Hunter cited Scarce's description of the process at the university council, whereas Greens MLC Tammy Franks challenged the scope of the consultations.

=== Nuclear Fuel Cycle Royal Commission (2015–2017) ===
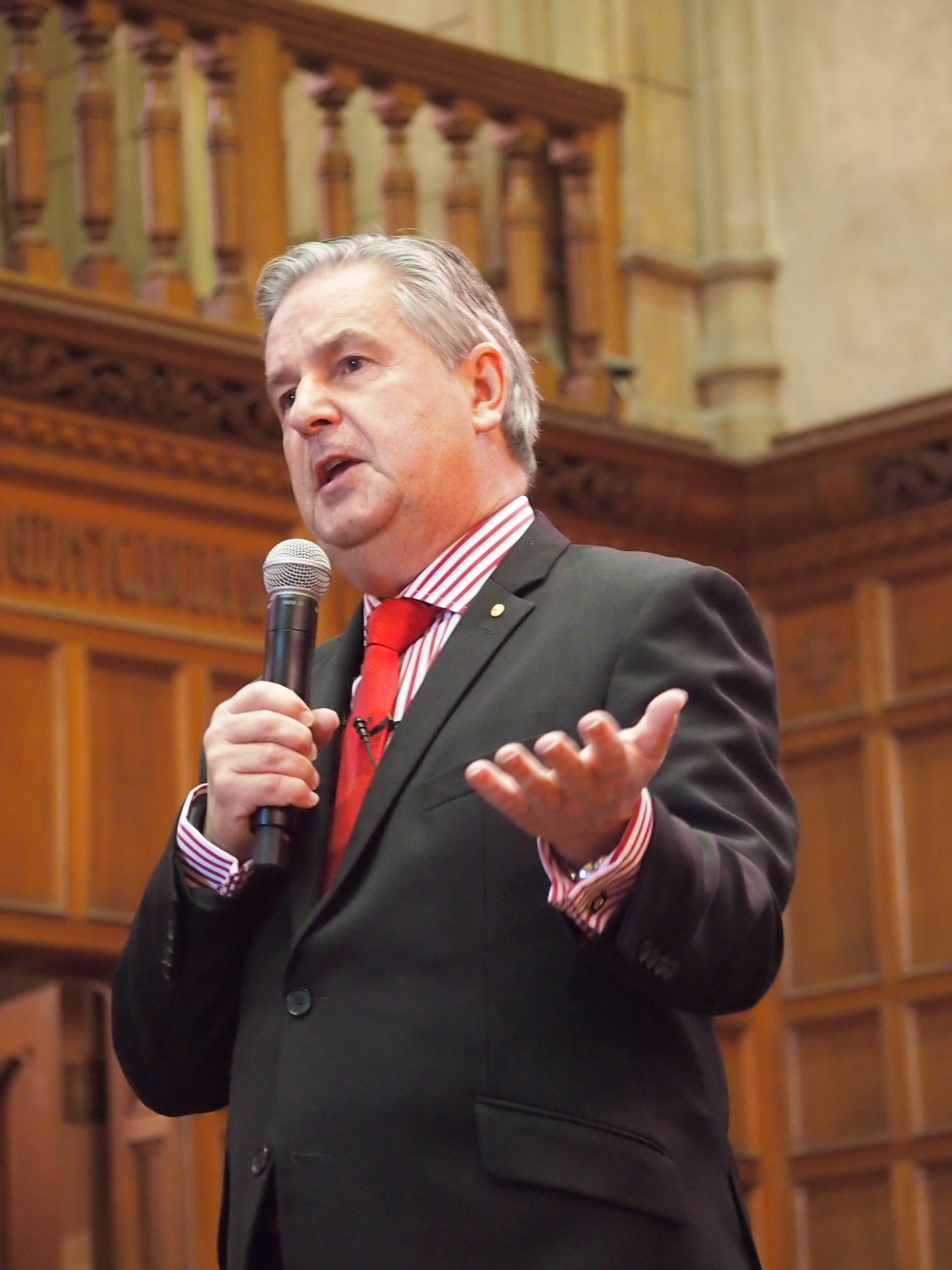
Scarce answering a question about the Nuclear Fuel Cycle Royal Commission at Bonython Hall, Adelaide, on 22 May 2015

In an announcement made on 8 February 2015, Premier Weatherill established the Nuclear Fuel Cycle Royal Commission, a public inquiry into the possibility of the state participating in the nuclear fuel cycle. On 19 March, Governor Le appointed Scarce as the commissioner. The investigation dealt with uranium prospecting and mining, additional processing and manufacturing, nuclear power production, and radioactive waste management.

Community consultation was done by Scarce in Coober Pedy on 14 May 2015. Public hearings for the commission started in Adelaide on 9 September, with Ross Garnaut, an economist, as the first witness. The preliminary findings were published by the commission on 15 February 2016. Scarce gave his final report to Le on 6 May, which was then made public on 9 May.

The recommendation was that a state-owned facility should be established for the storage and disposal of used fuel and radioactive waste imports from abroad, with the approval of the general public and the consent of the host community. The commission found out that it would earn about $100 billion profit over the period of 120 years. The other recommendation made by the commission was that it would not be commercially viable to establish a nuclear power station in the state after 2030.

In its report on 6 November 2016, two-thirds of the citizens' jury found that South Australia should not be considered for hosting the nuclear waste due to economic and safety considerations and the lack of consent from the local people, especially the aboriginal communities. The state government was still open to investigating the proposal, with Weatherill stating that he needs bipartisan and public support for the plan, which means holding a referendum in the state.

On 7 June 2017, Weatherill officially announced that the proposal was abandoned because there is no bipartisan support for it. Later, Scarce criticised the use of ca itizens' jury, describing it as a hasty process.

=== Other appointments and resignation (2018–2020) ===
Scarce was appointed as the chairman of the Adelaide Oval Stadium Management Authority on 26 April 2018 for a term of three years. His predecessor is John Olsen, who took up the post of deputy chairman. Scarce was re-appointed as the UofA's chancellor on 28 May for a third term until 30 November 2020.

In June 2018, discussions were initiated between the UofA and University of South Australia (UniSA) regarding a merger between the two institutions. The two university councils were supposed to discuss the joint report at the end of the year. However, on 23 October, Scarce and UniSA Chancellor Pauline Carr maannouncedhat talks have ceased prematurely due to failure of the two universities to reach consensus on major matters. According to Scarce, the UofA Council continues to believe that a merger will serve the best interests osf the state. Documents obtained through freedom of information laws revealed the names of the proposed university and the process of appointing its leaders as one of the controversial issues.

On 13 May 2019, Scarce met with his vice-chancellor Peter Rathjen, regarding claims of sexual harassment, and wrote him a letter of reprimand the next day. He took into consideration the confidentiality wishes of the complainants and legal advice when dealing with the matter.

Adelaide Oval and the Oval Hotel, viewed from the east on 7 February 2023

On 28 June 2019, the Adelaide Oval Stadium Management Authority (AOSMA) announced that Built Environs would build a $42 million Adelaide Oval Hotel. Scarce said the building project schedule would allow spectators to attend the matches. On 17 September, he and the chief executive of the authority gave testimony at a South Australian parliamentary select committee meeting, regarding the hotel. The chief executive told the committee how the profit from the hotel would repay the state government's loan, and Scarce responded to the committee's questions concerning possible conflicts of interest in managing the hotel.

At a House of Representatives inquiry into the preconditions for nuclear energy in Australia on 2 October 2019, Scarce gave testimony as an individual. Based on his experience at the Nuclear Fuel Cycle Royal Commission, Scarce contended that any nuclear program required community support and bipartisan consensus. He also noted that there was a need for sufficient time to enable the community to assess the threats and the management thereof. Scarce advocated the removal of legal restrictions to enable consideration of nuclear power as an alternative form of energy. Additionally, in another speech in Adelaide in the same month, Scarce recommended a national strategy for security combining defence, foreign relations, and domestic security. Furthermore, he proposed more open discussion of the security threats in the Indo-Pacific region, which is increasingly being influenced by China.

Scarce became national president of Scouts Australia in November 2019. He resigned from the position of chairman of Cancer Council South Australia in February 2020, being replaced by Karlene Maywald.

Following the further claims about Rathjen in March, Scarce reported the issue to the Independent Commissioner Against Corruption (ICAC), Bruce Lander, in a letter dated 27 March that was delivered on 30 March. On 26 April, the deputy chancellor of the university, Catherine Branson, informed Scarce that he should resign or else a recommendation would be made to the university council to remove him from his post. Scarce resigned from his post on 27 April, roughly six months before the end of his term. His resignation was announced on 4 May, while Rathjen's indefinite leave was announced on 5 May. Branson became the new chancellor of the university on 14 July.

In his public statement of 26 August 2020, Lander said that the initial complaint should have been referred to the Office for Public Integrity. He noted that Scarce was entitled to rely on the advice he received regarding the complaint, as he did not commit any misconduct or maladministration according to the ICAC Act.

=== Later public and community roles (2021–present) ===
On 16 September 2021, Scarce supported Australia's plan to purchase nuclear-powered submarines following the scrapping of the A$90 billion deal between France's Naval Group to build the Attack-class submarines. In his view, the AUKUS submarine program will require Australia to take into account the need for nuclear power and gain expertise in the management of nuclear fuel and waste. Scarce also advocated for the consideration of nuclear power in discussions on electricity pricing and reaching net-zero emissions.

In November 2021, Scarce took up the role of chair of the Operation Flinders Foundation, which runs early intervention programs for youth. In February 2022, Scarce took up the position of the first independent chair of Barossa Australia, a joint venture of the Barossa Grape & Wine Association and Tourism Barossa. During this period, he was the director of APC Technology.

Rob Kerin succeeded Scarce as chairman of AOSMA on 27 April 2022, with Scarce staying on as a board member after serving as chairman for four years. On 10 May, he officiated at the opening of a high ropes circuit at Yankaninna Station as part of the Adventure Therapy program under Operation Flinders.

In 2023, Scarce concluded his term as president of Novita Children's Services. On 16 May, he was named independent chairman of the master planning process for the Mount Gambier Education and Training Precinct. This $59 million precinct, to be developed within the existing TAFE site, consists of a technical college, the Forestry Centre of Excellence, and the redevelopment of the TAFE facilities.

Scarce resigned from the Coopers Foundation's Board of Governors on 8 October 2024. On 11 November, he resigned from his position as chair of Operation Flinders after serving three years in the position and was replaced by South Australian police commissioner Grant Stevens. He remained chair of Barossa Australia in 2024–25, having identified water security, regional development and international promotion as key issues in the organisation's annual report.

By July 2025, Scarce was patron of the South Australian Korean War Memorial Project. In that month, the state government committed $130,000 for the planning and development of a memorial for South Australians who fought in the Korean War. In November, Scarce completed his six-year tenure as national president of Scouts Australia at its annual general meeting in Sydenham, Victoria. The National Council selected David Hurley to succeed him as president.

Scarce, Penny Wong and Alice Rolls at the Remembrance Day service at Soldiers' Memorial Gardens, Unley, in 2026

In January 2026, both Scarce and his wife were celebrating their tenth year as joint patrons of AnglicareSA. On 6 February, the state government appointed Scarce as chairman of its Road Safety Governance Committee, which is made up of six members providing advice on road safety investments and programs.

== Honours and awards ==
The Conspicuous Service Cross (CSC) was bestowed on Scarce in the 1994 Australia Day Honours. He received a Member of the Order of Australia (AM) in the 2001 Queen's Birthday Honours for his distinguished service as Commander Training Command – Navy and Support Commander – Navy. In the 2004 Australia Day Honours, he was made an Officer of the Order of Australia (AO) for distinguished service in logistics management and acquisition as head of the Maritime Systems Division of the DMO.

Scarce was made a Knight of Grace of the Order of St John on 9 August 2007. In the 2008 Australia Day Honours, he was appointed a Companion of the Order of Australia (AC) for his contributions to Australia's defence industry and maritime transport management, and also for his service to the people of South Australia.

In December 2009, Scarce was honoured with an honorary doctorate from Flinders University. The University of New England bestowed an honorary Doctor of Letters on him in 2013. In that same year, he was inducted as a Baron of Barossa.

== Personal life ==
On 10 February 1975, Scarce married Elizabeth Anne Taylor, an officer in the Women's Royal Australian Naval Service (WRANS), while he was serving at HMAS Watson. She was promoted to the rank of third officer within the WRANS reserve on 14 June 1975. They have two children, Kasha and Kingsley.

As of 2007, Kasha was working as a youth counsellor in Sydney and Kingsley was a lieutenant in the Royal Australian Navy. Elizabeth was appointed an AM in the General Division in the 2021 Queen's Birthday Honours for service to the South Australian community. On 2 July 2022, Kingsley was commanding HMAS Brisbane (DDG 41) when its crew assisted in the rescue of two sailors from a capsized yacht near Wollongong.

Scarce enjoys playing golf and has travelled with the Cancer Council's Ride for a Reason team in the Tour Down Under. In relation to his appointment with the Cancer Council South Australia, Scarce mentioned that his grandmother had succumbed to cancer.

Government offices
Preceded by Marjorie Jackson-Nelson	34th Governor of South Australia; 2007–2014	Succeeded by Hieu Van Le
Academic offices
Preceded by Robert Hill	16th Chancellor of the University of Adelaide; 2014–2020	Succeeded by Catherine Branson
