= Peter Rathjen =

Australian medical researcher

22nd Vice-chancellor of the University of Adelaide
- In office 8 January 2018 – 20 July 2020
- Chancellor: Kevin Scarce; Catherine Branson
- Preceded by: Warren Bebbington; Mike Brooks (interim)
- Succeeded by: Mike Brooks (interim); Peter Høj

19th Vice-Chancellor of the University of Tasmania
- In office April 2011 – 2017
- Preceded by: Daryl Le Grew
- Succeeded by: Rufus Black

Personal details
- Born: 12 February 1964 (age 62) Cambridge, United Kingdom
- Education: University of Adelaide
- Occupation: Biochemist and academic administrator
- Scientific career
- Fields: Biochemistry
- Workplaces: University of Adelaide; University of Melbourne; University of Tasmania
- Thesis: Expression signals in retro-elements (1988)
- Doctoral advisors: Alan J. Kingsman; Susan M. Kingsman

Peter David Rathjen (born 12 February 1964 in Cambridge, England) is an Australian scientist and medical researcher. He was the 22nd vice-chancellor of the University of Adelaide, from January 2018 through July 2020. He was previously the 19th vice-chancellor of the University of Tasmania from 2011 to 2017.

== Biography ==
Born in the United Kingdom, Rathjen moved to South Australia in 1965 when he was a child. He was educated at Blackwood High School in Adelaide. He studied Science at the University of Adelaide, majoring in biochemistry and genetics, and completing an honours degree.

Rathjen was awarded a Rhodes Scholarship to New College, Oxford in 1985. He was awarded a DPhil in 1987, and then worked as a postdoctoral researcher on embryonic stem cells from 1988 to 1990.

Rathjen returned to the University of Adelaide, where he worked as lecturer in biochemistry from 1990 to 1995 and professor in biochemistry from 1995 to 2006. He was appointed to the chair of biochemistry in 1995. He became head of the department of molecular biosciences in 2000, and became foundation executive dean of the faculty of sciences in 2002, a role he kept until 2005.

He was appointed dean of the faculty of science at the University of Melbourne in 2006; in 2008, he became dean of the graduate school of science, and from 2008 to 2011 he served as deputy vice-chancellor (research). He was involved in Melbourne's controversial program of 'focused excellence', that shed some staff positions in order to reduce a growing debt.

In April 2011 Rathjen took up the role of vice-chancellor at the University of Tasmania. During his vice-chancellorship, he promoted the university as a driver of socio-economic prosperity in Tasmania, including plans to move University of Tasmania campuses into CBD districts in Burnie, Launceston (yet to be completed), and Hobart (yet to be completed). During his vice-chancellorship, the university launched new associate degree programs. However, controversies during Rathjen's vice-chancellorship included the use of university funds for what was perceived as "travelling the globe in style", spending $50,000 in less than 6 months. In August 2020, a freedom of information request from the ABC revealed Rathjen spent more than $277,000 on business travel over four years during his tenure as vice-chancellor. His wife, Joy Rathjen, also a University of Tasmania employee, accompanied him on nine of the business class trips, costing the university $57,083.

In 2018, Rathjen returned to the University of Adelaide in the roles of vice-chancellor and president, in succession to Mike Brooks.

In May 2020, Rathjen commenced an indefinite leave of absence after University of Adelaide chancellor Kevin Scarce resigned without public explanation the previous day. Later in the week, the Independent Commissioner Against Corruption (ICAC) confirmed he was investigating allegations of improper conduct by the vice-chancellor of the University of Adelaide. Rathjen, accused of engaging in "a personal relationship with a staff member", was succeeded by acting vice-chancellor Mike Brooks. Rathjen formally resigned in July 2020, "due to ill health". In August 2020, the ICAC found that Rathjen had committed "serious misconduct" by sexually harassing two University of Adelaide colleagues, had lied to the then chancellor Kevin Scarce, and also lied to the commissioner in his evidence with respect to an investigation of sexual misconduct with a postgraduate student when he was employed at the University of Melbourne. The ICAC Commissioner Bruce Lander acknowledged there were "further issues" in the full 170-page report on the investigation which he chose not to release due to privacy concerns surrounding the victims, instead releasing an abridged 12-page version ‘Statement about an Investigation: Misconduct by the vice-chancellor of the University of Adelaide’. In determining his findings, the Commissioner relied in part on the personal blog of US journalist Michael Balter who documented Rathjen's prior history of sexual harassment, and was largely responsible for bringing the matter to the public's attention, and ultimately ICAC's. The ICAC Commissioner's damning findings against Rathjen have put the University of Adelaide's culture under intense scrutiny in both the local and international media.

Academic offices
Preceded by Daryl Le Grew	19th Vice-Chancellor of the University of Tasmania; 2011–2017	Succeeded by Rufus Black
Preceded by Warren Bebbington / Mike Brooks	22nd Vice-Chancellor of the University of Adelaide; 2018–2020	Succeeded by Mike Brooks / Peter Høj
