= Warren Bebbington =

Australian academic administrator

Warren Bebbington AM
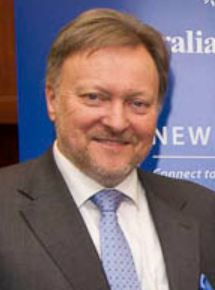
- Professor Bebbington in 2014

20th Vice-Chancellor of the University of Adelaide
- In office 2012–2017
- Chancellor: Robert Hill; Di Davidson (acting); Kevin Scarce
- Preceded by: James McWha
- Succeeded by: Mike Brooks (interim); Peter Rathjen

Warren Arthur Bebbington AM (born 25 April 1952) was the 20th Vice Chancellor of the University of Adelaide. He was previously the Deputy Vice Chancellor (University Affairs) at the University of Melbourne. He commenced his position at the University of Adelaide in July 2012, and retired in April 2017.

== Career ==
Bebbington is a Fulbright Scholar, and holds master's degrees in arts, music and philosophy and a PhD. He studied at the University of Melbourne and at Queens College, Columbia University, and the Graduate Center of the City University of New York. He worked as a teacher and was honored for his efforts as a recipient of the University of Melbourne Award for Excellence in Teaching (Humanities) in 2005 and an Australian Learning and Teaching Council Citation for "30 years of outstanding teaching" in 2008. His teaching appointments included the Australian National University's School of Music.

He is a published author of works on music, and was the music member on the international advisory committee for the Encyclopædia Britannica for over a decade.

=== Academia ===
As his career progressed, Bebbington moved into leadership positions within academia. He served as a Dean at both the University of Melbourne and University of Queensland. He was appointed Deputy Vice-Chancellor (University Affairs) and later Pro-Vice Chancellor of the University of Melbourne prior to his appointment as Vice Chancellor of the University of Adelaide (2012–2017). At Adelaide, he was succeeded as Vice-Chancellor by Mike Brooks in the interim, and later by Peter Rathjen, the former Vice Chancellor of the University of Tasmania and Dean of Science at the University of Melbourne.

Bebbington was appointed a Member of the Order of Australia in the 2020 Australia Day Honours.

Academic offices
Preceded by James McWha	Vice-Chancellor of the University of Adelaide; 2012–2018	Succeeded by Mike Brooks / Peter Rathjen
