= Catherine Branson =

Australian judge (born 1948)

The Honourable Catherine Branson AC KC
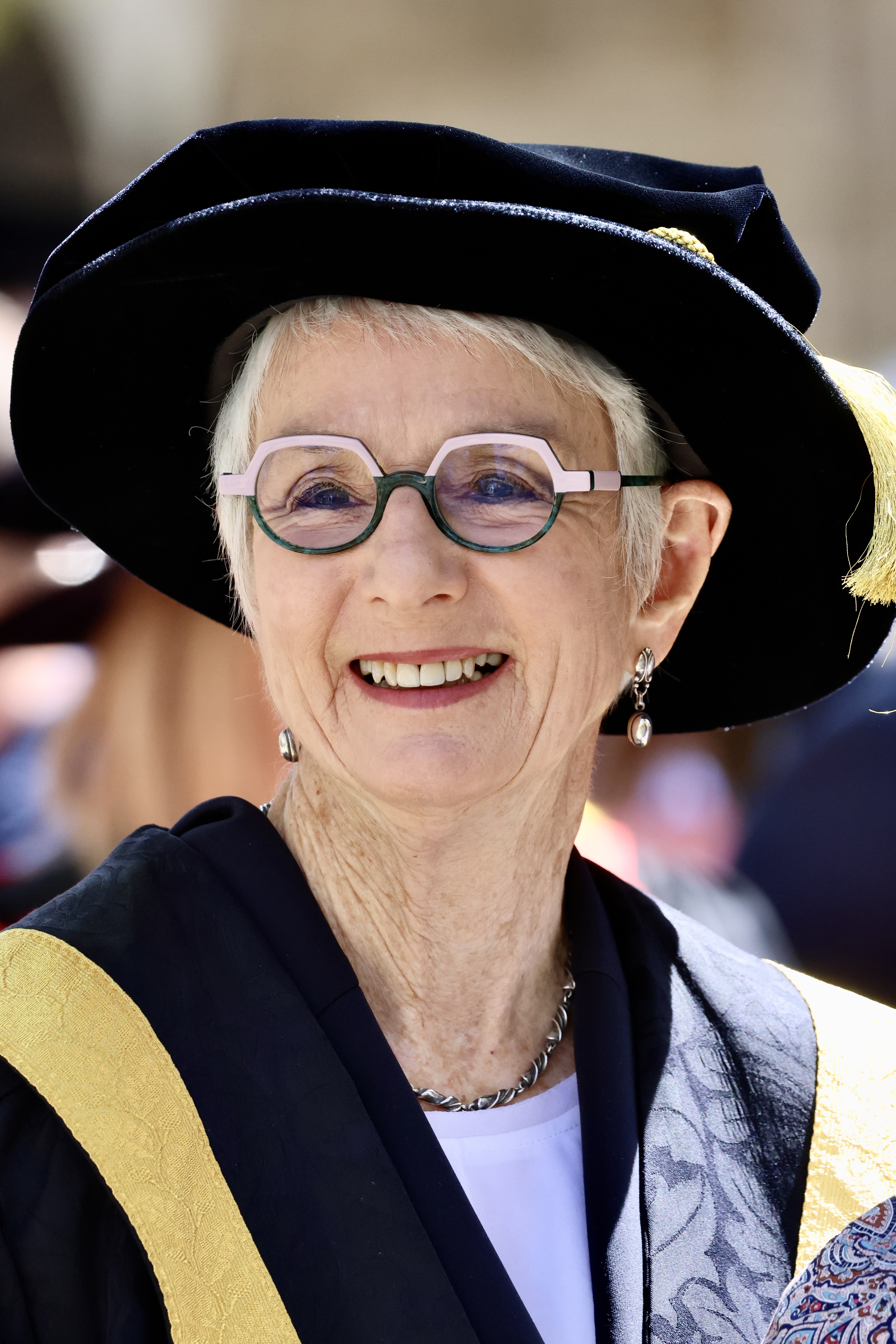
- Branson in 2025

17th Chancellor of the University of Adelaide
- In office 14 July 2020 – 31 March 2026
- Deputy: David Hill; Kenneth Williams; Juliet Brown
- Preceded by: Kevin Scarce
- Succeeded by: Position abolished

Deputy Chancellor of the University of Adelaide
- In office 2017 – July 2020
- Chancellor: Kevin Scarce
- Preceded by: Di Davidson
- Succeeded by: David Hill

President of the Australian Human Rights Commission
- In office 14 October 2008 – 29 July 2012
- Nominated by: Kevin Rudd
- Preceded by: John von Doussa
- Succeeded by: Gillian Triggs

Judge of the Federal Court of Australia
- In office 16 May 1994 – 13 October 2008
- Nominated by: Paul Keating
- Appointed by: Bill Hayden

Personal details
- Born: Catherine Margaret Rayner; 1948 (age 77–78) Terowie, South Australia, Australia
- Spouse: John Branson
- Education: Presbyterian Girls' College
- Alma mater: University of Adelaide (BA; LLB)
- Occupation: Judge; solicitor

Catherine Margaret Branson (born 1948) is an Australian former judge and solicitor who served as a judge of the Federal Court of Australia from 1994 to 2008, and later as president of the Australian Human Rights Commission (AHRC) from 2008 to 2012.

Branson was born in Terowie in 1948 and raised on a wheat and sheep property near Hallett, South Australia. She attended local government schools before enrolling as a boarder at Presbyterian Girls' College in Adelaide. Initially intending to study psychology, she chose to study law at the University of Adelaide, where she graduated with a Bachelor of Laws in 1970.

Beginning her legal career in the 1970s, Branson worked in both public and commercial sectors. She became the first female Crown Solicitor of South Australia before specialising in administrative law as a barrister. She was appointed Queen's Counsel in 1992 and to the Federal Court of Australia in 1994, serving fourteen years and presiding over significant cases, including the Yorta Yorta native title appeal. In 2008, she became president of the Australian Human Rights Commission, advocating for same-sex civil marriage and a federal charter of rights.

Since 2013, Branson has held multiple academic and governance roles, including adjunct professor at the Adelaide Law School, member of the University of Adelaide Council, and advisory board member of the Andrew and Renata Kaldor Centre for International Refugee Law. She has also served as chair of the university's Audit, Compliance and Risk Committee, patron of the Neurosurgical Research Foundation and Payla Fund, director of the Human Rights Law Centre in Melbourne, and board member of Cancer Council South Australia. She became deputy chancellor in 2017 and was appointed the 17th and final chancellor in 2020, being reappointed in 2022 and 2024 for successive terms. She oversaw the university's 150th anniversary, dissolution, and transmutation into Adelaide University. Branson is a Fellow of the Australian Academy of Law.

== Early life and education ==
Catherine Margaret Branson was born in Terowie in 1948 and grew up on a wheat and sheep farm near Hallett, in the mid-north of South Australia. She is the daughter of Max and Barbara Rayner. Her father required her to learn to drive all the property's vehicles, including tractors. After beginning her education at local government schools, she started attending Presbyterian Girls' College, Adelaide at the age of ten as a boarder. Branson planned to take up psychology as her specialisation in the university in 1966. However, she got admission to Flinders University where she had to study geography and Spanish because psychology was taught only at the University of Adelaide along with law and economics as a combined course. Branson opted for law. She performed well in her first year and continued studying the subject at the University of Adelaide. She graduated with a Bachelor of Laws in 1970.

== Legal career ==
=== Early career (1972–1992) ===
In 1972, following a period as a tutor in the Adelaide Law School, Branson went abroad, visiting a Palestinian refugee camp in Beirut. Branson traveled to the United States and volunteered at a legal aid office near Michigan. She was exposed to the systemic socioeconomic inequalities facing the local African-American community. Branson credited her time abroad with helping develop her commitment to human rights and social justice.

Branson went back to Australia in 1973 and began her articles of clerkship while completing her Bachelor of Arts at the same university. She entered a legal profession dominated by men, where women often faced discrimination and harassment. Although these challenges were not the main reason for leaving private practice, broader gender-based restrictions influenced her decision to pursue a career in the public sector. In 1977, she earned her arts degree. That same year, she was appointed research assistant to the Solicitor-General, Brian Cox, in the South Australian Department of Legal Services, where she began assisting in High Court hearings. Branson later advocated for reforms aimed at creating safer and more equitable workplaces for women in the legal profession.

Branson began working as a solicitor at the Crown Solicitor's Office in 1978 and joined the National Women's Advisory Council to assist in formulating federal policy advice on women's rights and welfare. She subsequently provided legal advice to the state government and accompanied Premier Don Dunstan to a premiers' conference as his legal adviser. At the age of 35, she became Australia's first female Crown Solicitor and head of the Attorney-General's Department. She later moved to private practice as a barrister in a previously all-male chambers. Branson joined the South Australian Bar in 1989, specialising in administrative law, including business law and discrimination legislation, and was appointed Queen's Counsel in 1992.

=== Federal Court of Australia (1994–2008) ===
Branson was appointed to the Federal Court of Australia on 16 May 1994. The appointment was part of a broader effort to introduce gender diversity to the bench, and Branson has acknowledged that her gender influenced the timing of the offer. She stated that the presence of women on the bench affected judicial culture by encouraging discussions that incorporated experiences and perspectives specific to women. Branson served fourteen years on the Federal Court, primarily in Sydney, and was at times considered a potential nominee for the High Court.

From 1998 to 2000, Branson served as president of the Australian Institute of Judicial Administration. She also engaged in international collaboration with judges in countries including Pakistan, Indonesia, and the Palestinian Territories. During this period, on 19 August 1999, she participated in the Federal Court hearing of the Yorta Yorta native title appeal, which contested a previous ruling that denied the Yorta Yorta people native title over lands in southern New South Wales and northern Victoria. From 2000 to 2006, she was a board member of the International Development Law Organization. On 22 November 2007, Branson was part of the Federal Court panel, alongside Justices Paul Finn and John Tamberlin, that dismissed an appeal by the Wilderness Society challenging the legality of the Commonwealth government's process for assessing the proposed Gunns pulp mill in northern Tasmania. She retired from the Federal Court on 13 October 2008.

=== Australian Human Rights Commission (2008–2012) ===
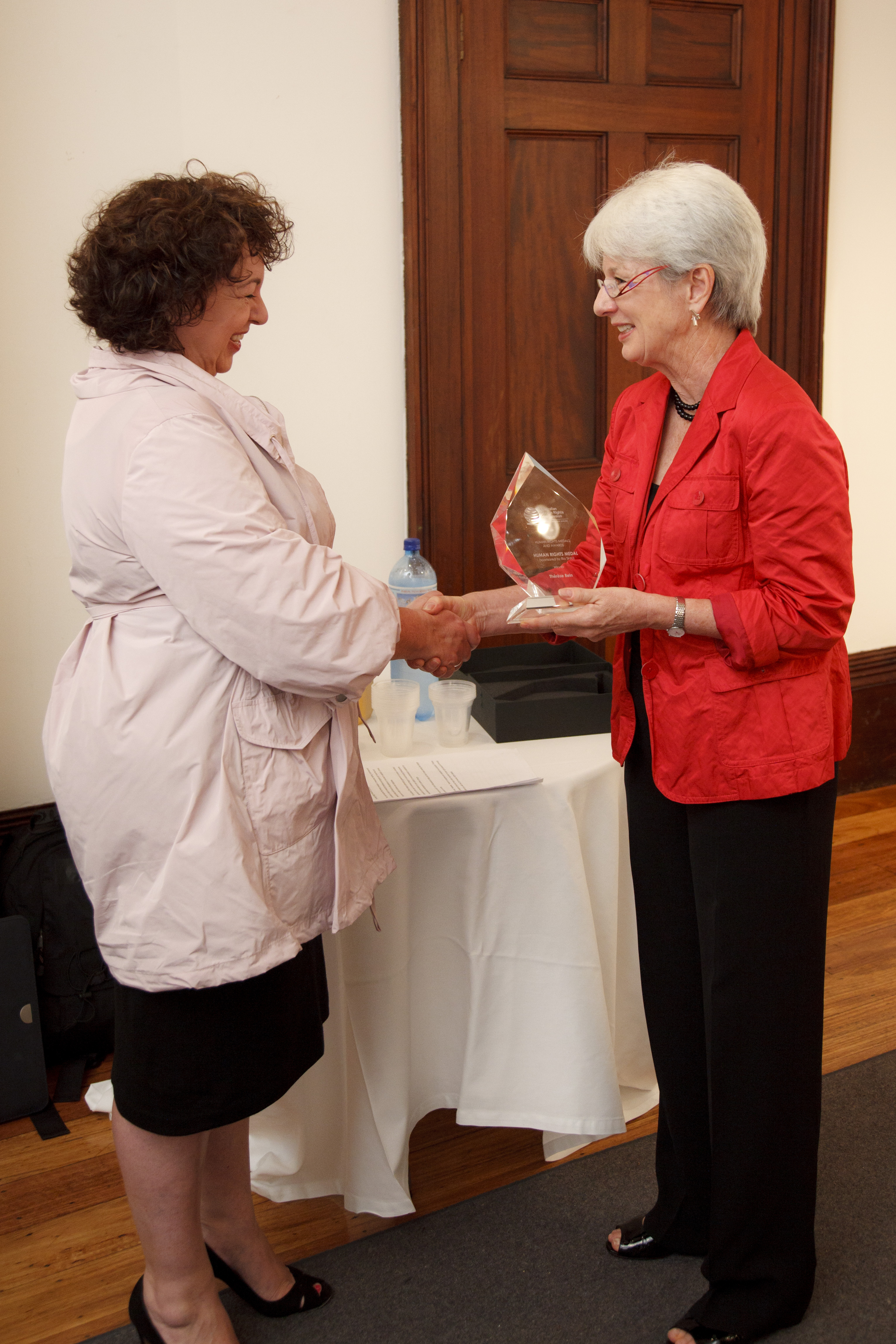
Thérèse Rein receiving the 2010 Human Rights Medal from Branson, then president of the AHRC

On 7 August 2008, following fourteen years as a judge of the Federal Court, Branson was appointed president of the Australian Human Rights Commission (AHRC). She commenced her five-year term on 14 October, succeeding John von Doussa. The role expanded her responsibilities beyond the judiciary to include issues affecting the homeless, unemployed, families of children with disabilities, and individuals in immigration detention centres. She implemented a three-year strategic plan to identify Australia's most pressing human rights challenges and to prioritise areas where the AHRC could have the greatest impact. On 12 July 2009, Branson was also appointed Human Rights Commissioner. During her tenure, she advocated for a federal charter of rights and supported civil marriage for same-sex couples.

Branson's work involved visits to detention facilities on Christmas Island and mainland Australia, including Inverbrackie in South Australia, which she described as the most distressing aspect of her role. She urged policymakers to witness firsthand the effects of their policies and called for an end to obligatory imprisonment and offshore processing on Christmas Island to ensure compliance with the International Covenant on Civil and Political Rights. In addition, Branson gave the keynote speech at the Australia–Philippines Policy Forum on Human Rights and took part in international human rights discussions, including as the Australia–Vietnam Human Rights Dialogue.

Among her final acts as commissioner, Branson conducted an inquiry into the treatment of individuals suspected of people smuggling offences who claimed to be children. The inquiry culminated in the report An Age of Uncertainty, tabled in the Parliament of Australia on 27 July 2012, calling attention to human rights breaches from disputed age assessments and prolonged detention of minors in adult facilities. In February 2012, she announced she would step down as president of the AHRC at the end of July, citing the need to spend more time with her family. Her term concluded on 29 July, and she was succeeded by Gillian Triggs.

== Later career ==
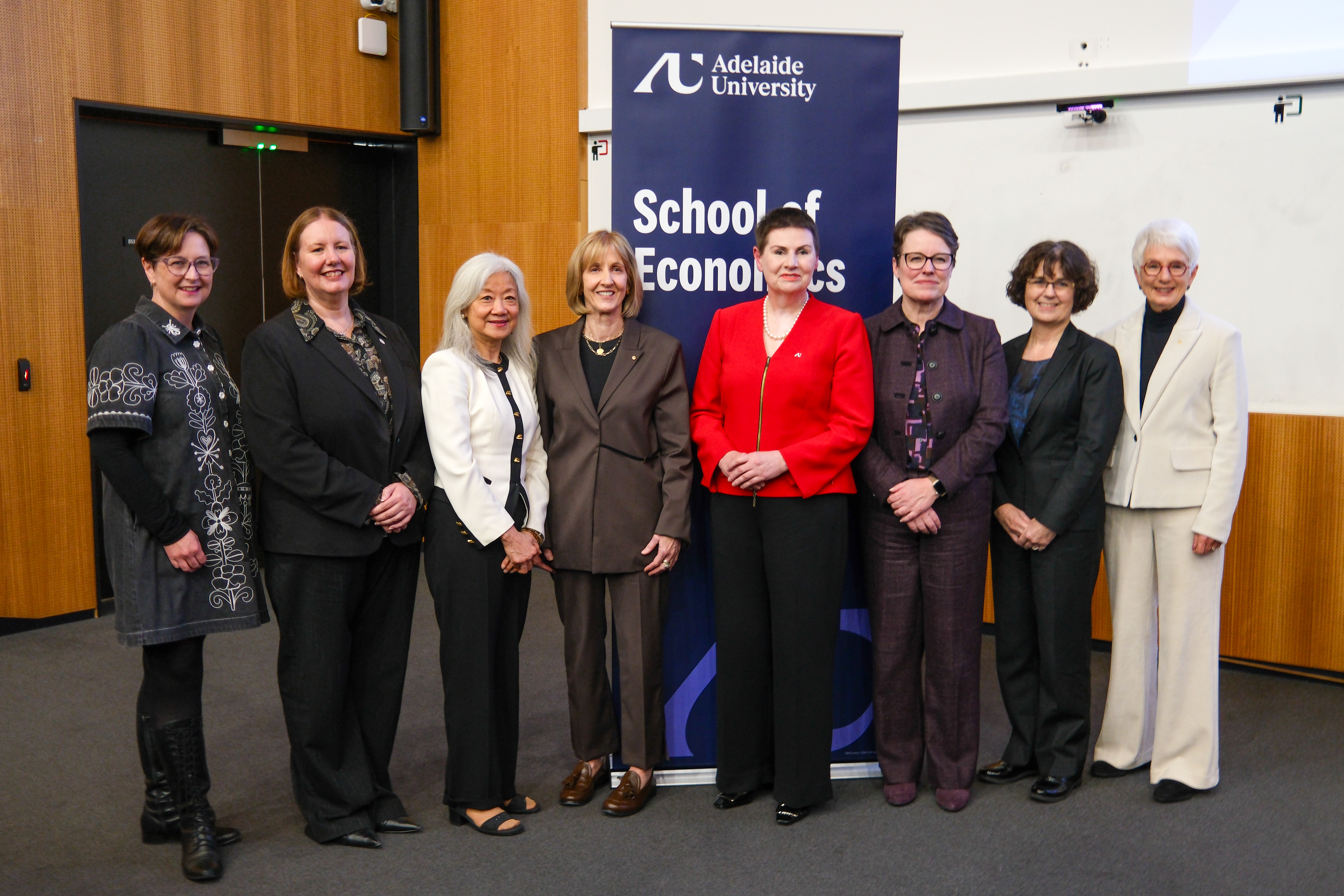
Carolyn Hewson (centre left), Pauline Carr (centre right), Nicola Phillips (third from the left), and Branson (far right) at the 2026 Joseph Fisher Public Lecture, following Branson's departure as chancellor

Branson has been an adjunct professor at the Adelaide Law School since 2013. In the same year, she joined the University of Adelaide Council and served as an advisory board member of the Andrew and Renata Kaldor Centre for International Refugee Law until 2017. Since 2014, she has held several roles, including chair of the University of Adelaide's Audit, Compliance and Risk Committee, patron of the Neurosurgical Research Foundation, patron of the Payla Fund, director of the Human Rights Law Centre (HRLC) in Melbourne, and board member of Cancer Council South Australia. She became deputy chancellor of the University of Adelaide in 2017. She was appointed chair of the HRLC board the same year before concluding her tenure in March 2021, when she was succeeded by Robynne Quiggin.

On 14 July 2020, Branson was appointed the 17th and final chancellor of the University of Adelaide, assuming the role during a governance crisis following the resignation of her predecessor, Kevin Scarce, and amid investigations into the university's leadership. She was reappointed unanimously in February 2022 for a second two-year term, and again in February 2024 for a third term, initially set to expire on 12 July 2026. However, due to the university's legal separation, her tenure ended earlier that year on 31 March; coinciding with the university's 150th anniversary and its subsequent amalgamation with UniSA to form Adelaide University. Branson is also a Fellow of the Australian Academy of Law and chairs the South Australian Selection Panel for the General Sir John Monash Scholarship.

== Recognitions and honours ==
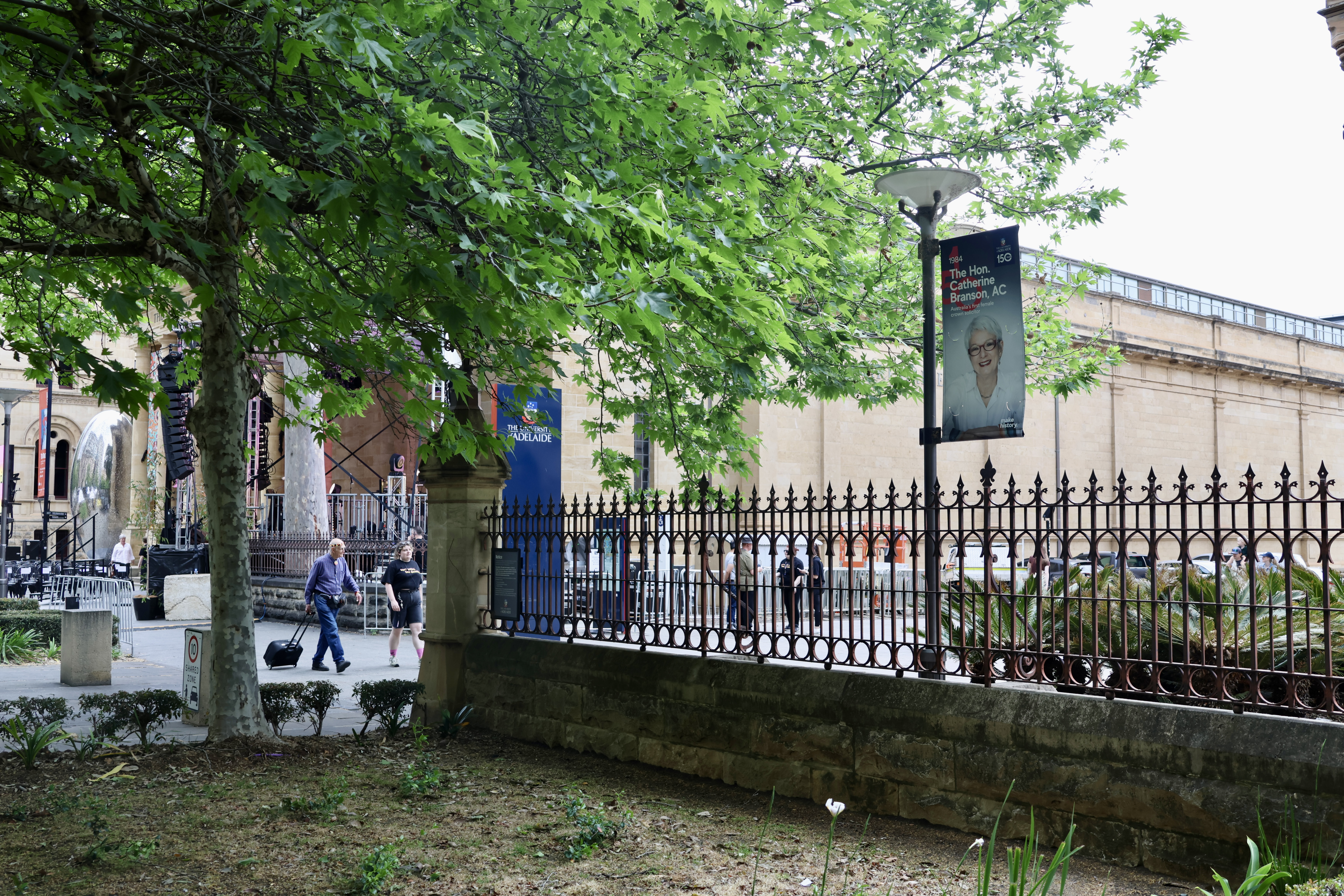
Poster honouring Branson as a distinguished alumnus on the University of Adelaide campus, 16 October 2025

In 2011, Branson received a Distinguished Alumni Award from the University of Adelaide in recognition of her contributions to Australian law and human rights. Her advocacy and legal career were further recognized with honorary degrees: a Doctor of Laws from Flinders University in 2012, followed by a Doctor of Letters from Macquarie University in 2014. In the 2018 Queen's Birthday Honours, she was appointed a Companion of the Order of Australia (AC) for eminent service to the judiciary, human rights, and civil liberties. In 2025, Branson was awarded the honorary degree of Doctor of the University from the University of South Australia in recognition of her distinguished service to the community. The University of Adelaide also awarded Branson the honorary degree of Doctor of the University.

== Personal life ==
She married John Branson in her early 20s. As of 2012, she resides in Adelaide. During her formative years, she was inspired by role models, including Mary Gaudron, who served as Solicitor General of New South Wales and later became the first woman appointed to the High Court of Australia, and Roma Mitchell, the first female judge in Australia.

Legal offices
Preceded by John von Doussa	President of the Australian Human Rights Commission; 2008–2012	Succeeded by Gillian Triggs
Academic offices
Preceded by Kevin Scarce	17th Chancellor of the University of Adelaide; 2020–2026	Succeeded by Position abolished
