= Keith Briggs =

Keith Briggs may refer to:

- Keith Briggs (mathematician), English mathematician
- Keith Briggs (footballer) (born 1981), English football player
