= Nicola Phillips =

Vice-chancellor of Adelaide University

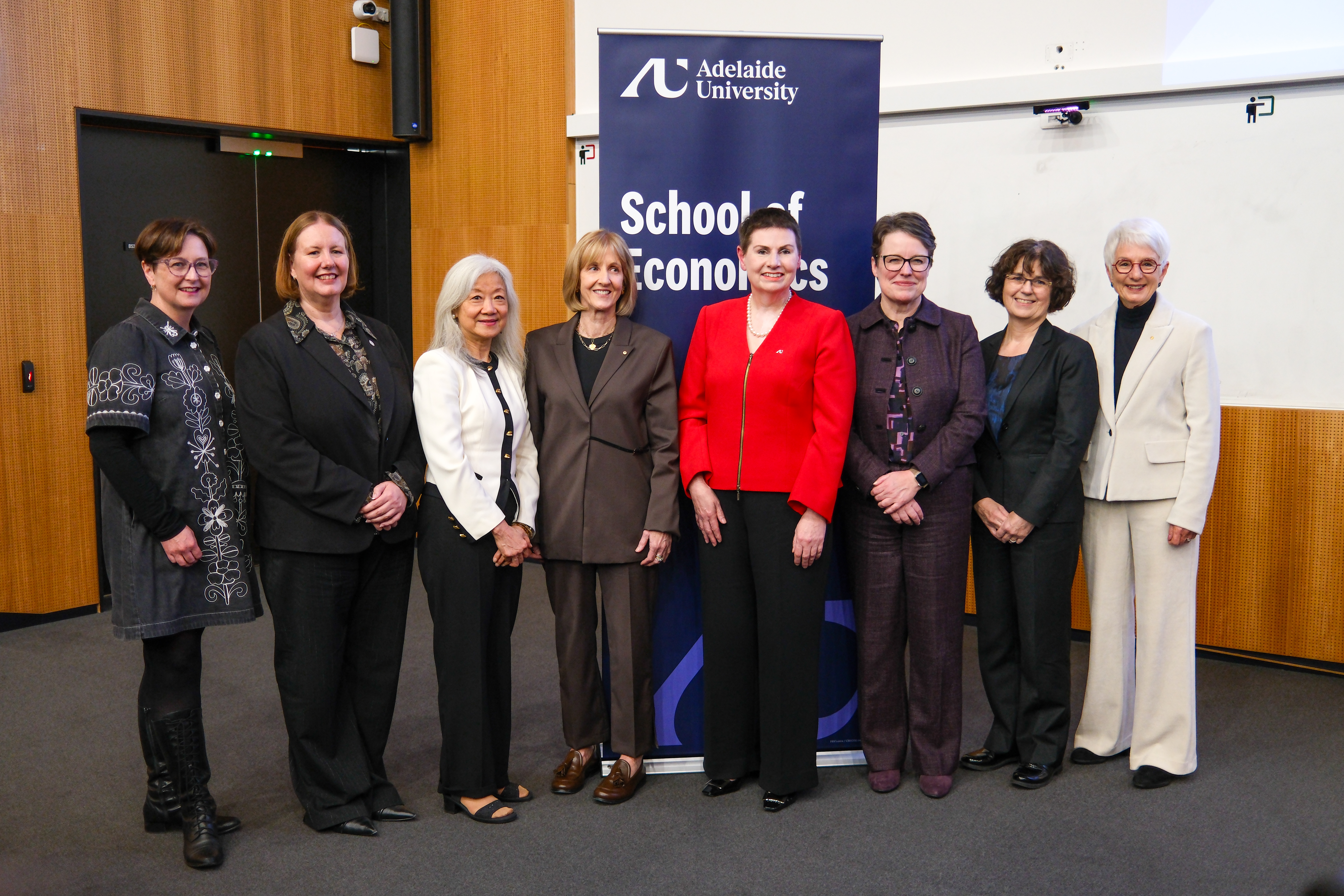
- Phillips (3rd from the right), 2026

Vice Chancellor of Adelaide University
- Incumbent
- Assumed office 12 January 2026
- Chancellor: Pauline Carr
- Preceded by: Peter Høj; David Lloyd

Personal details
- Education: King's College London (BA); London School of Economics (MA, PhD)

Nicola Phillips is a British academic and administrator. She was appointed inaugural substantive vice-chancellor (becoming the second VC overall) of Adelaide University in Adelaide, South Australia, in January 2026; following thirty years of academic and leadership experience at universities in the UK and Australia.

== Early life and education ==
Nicola Phillips completed her undergraduate degree in Hispanic studies at King's College London, going on to earn first a master's degree in comparative government and a PhD in international relations from the London School of Economics and Political Science.

== Career ==
Phillips held academic and leadership positions at the Universities of Warwick, Manchester, and Sheffield, before being appointed vice-president and vice-principal (education) at King's College London. She was also professor of political economy at KCL.

She has held visiting fellowships and professorships across the world, including the Australian National University, the University of British Columbia, and the Instituto Tecnológico Autónomo de México. Her research and teaching has focused on global political economy, in particular global economic governance, labour and migration in the global economy, and global inequality.

Phillips was appointed provost at the University of Melbourne in September 2021. She also held positions as both acting and interim vice-chancellor at the university during her tenure there,

In June 2025 her appointment as second vice-chancellor of the newly-formed Adelaide University (created by merging the University of Adelaide and University of South Australia) was announced by the university, after a global search. Her new role started with the official opening of the university on 29 January 2026, when she succeeded co-vice-chancellors Peter Høj and David Lloyd, who had served during the transitional phase of the merger. Her appointment was affirmed by unanimous vote of the Adelaide University Transition Council. Chancellor Pauline Carr said that the appointment reflected the new university's maintenance of a global outlook, while also serving South Australia.

== Other roles and activities ==
Phillips has been editor of the Review of International Political Economy, and editor and editor-in-chief of New Political Economy. As of 2021 she was a member of several editorial and advisory boards of various journals and book series, including Review of International Studies, International Affairs, and the Cambridge Studies in International Relations series. She was also a contributor to International Affairs.

In 2014 she was member of the Research Excellence Framework sub-panel for Politics and International Studies, and from 2015 to 2016 she was chair of the British International Studies Association

As of 2026 Phillips is a member of Chief Executive Women.

== Honours and awards ==
- 2016: Fellow, Academy of Social Sciences (FAcSS)
- Fellow, Royal Society of Arts (FRSA)
- 2018: J. Ann Tickner Prize from the International Studies Association, "for combining bravery in pursuing pioneering research that pushes the boundaries of the discipline with a deep commitment to teaching and mentorship"
