= G. C. Ligertwood =

Australian judge

PTE The Hon. Justice Sir George Coutts Ligertwood KC (15 October 1888 – 13 October 1967), commonly referred to as G. C. Ligertwood, was a Judge of the Supreme Court of South Australia (12 July 1945–14 October 1958).

== Early life and education ==
Ligertwood was born on 15 October 1888, a son of William Leith Ligertwood of Maylands, a suburb of Adelaide, South Australia. He was educated at Norwood Public school, followed by the Grote Street Pupil Teachers' School (became Adelaide High School), where he won an exhibition for three years at the University of Adelaide. He graduated BA in 1908 and LLB in 1910, winning the Stow prize in three consecutive years, thus securing a Stow Scholarship, and David Murray Scholarship in Private International Law, serving his articles with his uncle J. R. Anderson, KC.

== Career ==
=== Public service ===
Ligertwood was admitted to the Bar on 15 December 1910, and the following year was appointed by Chief Justice Sir Samuel Way as his associate, succeeding Mjr. W. L. Stuart, who had accepted the position of solicitor to the Land Titles Office. In February 1914 Way was appointed Lieut. Governor for the duration of Sir Day Bosanquet's absence from the State (he never returned and was succeeded by Henry Galway), and chose Ligertwood to be his private secretary. Ligertwood was on 1 September 1915 appointed acting master of the Supreme Court during the absence of Mjr. Stuart on military duties. At the end of the year he left the public service for private practice.

=== Military and legal career ===
Early in 1918 he joined the law firm of Stock & Bennett and on 6 May 1918 enlisted in the Australian Imperial Force, returning to South Australia in 1919 to become a partner in the firm Baker, McEwin, Ligertwood and Millhouse. He was appointed as a King's Counsel on 28 August 1930.

He served as the President of the Law Society of South Australia from 1935 to 1937 and again from 1941 to 1943. He was a member of the executive-committee of the Law Council of Australia in 1937 and in 1942–43 and served as a vice-president in 1937.

=== Judicial career ===
Ligertwood served on the bench of the Supreme Court from 12 July 1945 until his retirement in 1958. The Federal government appointed him to three royal commissions. In 1945, he was appointed Royal Commissioner by Prime Minister Ben Chifley to look into the conduct of Lieutenant General Gordon Bennett; in 1949, he took part in a commission into timber-leases in New Guinea; finally, in 1954–55 he was one of three commissioners who examined espionage in Australia.

=== Other roles ===
From 1930–67, Ligertwood served as a governor of Scotch College, Adelaide.

He was chairman of the planning committee for the Flinders University of South Australia (founded 1966).

He held the following roles at the University of Adelaide:

- Examiner in wrongs (1913–15)
- Examiner in property (1917 and 1919–26)
- Member of council from 1942
- Warden of the senate (1945–59)
- Deputy-chancellor (1958–61)
- Inaugural chairman of the management committee of the Mawson Institute for Antarctic Research, 1961
- Chancellor (1961–66)
- Patron of the Adelaide University Football Club (1966)

== Personal life ==
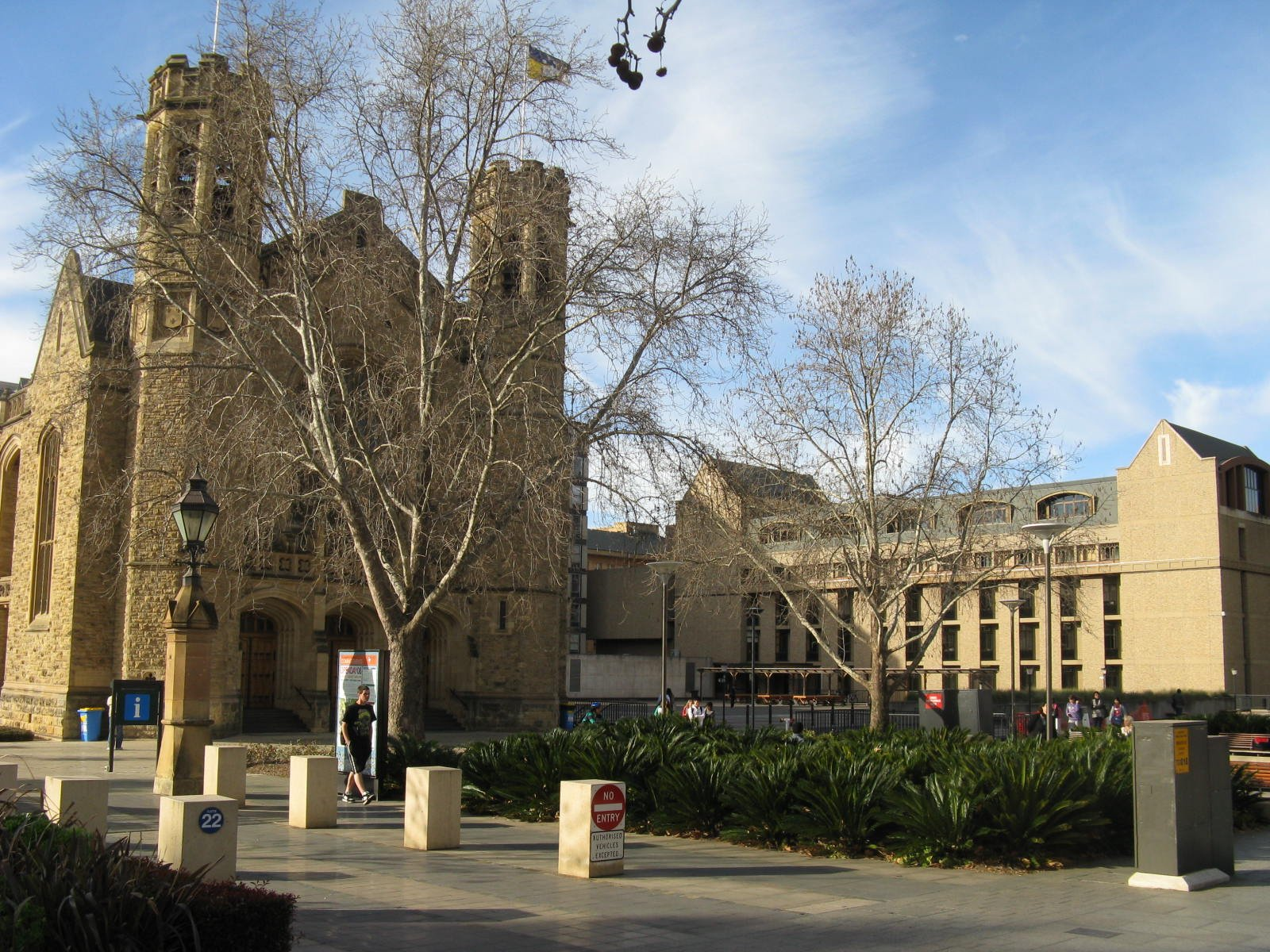
L-R: Bonython Hall & the Ligertwood Building, University of Adelaide, North Terrace, Adelaide.

Before he married, Ligertwood was a member of the Modern Pickwick Club. He married Edith Emily Naismith at the Methodist Church, Upper Sturt on 6 April 1915. They had four children:

- Captain William Leith Ligertwood II, MC
  (1916–1942)
- Helen Ligertwood (b. 1917)
- Flight Lieutenant Neil Coutts Ligertwood (1920–1990)
- Marion Jean Ligertwood (b. 1927)

He became a member of the Adelaide Club in 1929, and was a prominent Freemason.

Ligertwood died on 13 October 1967, in Adelaide.

== Honours ==
Ligertwood was knighted in 1956. In 1959, he was appointed royal commissioner by the Western Australian government to inquire into betting. He chaired the Federal committee on taxation (1959–61), and the South Australian committee on assessment for land tax (1962–64).

He received an honorary LL.D. from the University of Western Australia in 1963, and another from the University of Adelaide in 1964.
