= Angas Hurst =

Australian mathematical physicist

Wing Commander Professor Angas Hurst AM FAA

Acting Vice-Chancellor of the University of Adelaide
- In office 17 February 1985 – 7 March 1985
- Chancellor: Dame Roma Mitchell
- Preceded by: Donald Stranks
- Succeeded by: Donald Stranks

Personal details
- Born: Charles Angas Hurst; 22 September 1923
- Died: 19 October 2011 (aged 88)

Wing Commander Charles Angas Hurst (22 September 1923 – 19 October 2011) was an Australian mathematical physicist noted for his work in lattice models, quantum field theory, asymptotic expansions and Lie groups. He was appointed a Member of the Order of Australia in 2003, elected a Fellow of the Australian Academy of Science in 1972, and awarded the Centenary Medal and an Hon DSc (Melb).

His PhD was a seminal work on quantum field theory, developing asymptotic expansions for perturbation expansions. In 1952 Hurst represented Australia in the inaugural International Mathematical Union.

Hurst's work with Herbert Green on lattice problems and the Ising model led to the Free fermion field model, which contained all known properties of Fermions at the time of its publication. Hurst's work with Thirring (Thirring model) found the simplest non-linear field and is still used as a test model for perturbation theory.

Hurst served as acting vice-chancellor of the University of Adelaide in 1985, relieving Donald (Don) Stranks.
