= Di Davidson =

Australian agricultural scientist

Di Davidson OAM FTSE

Deputy Chancellor of the University of Adelaide
- In office 2013–2016
- Chancellor: Robert Hill; Herself; Kevin Scarce
- Preceded by: Pamela Martin
- Succeeded by: Catherine Branson

Acting Chancellor of the University of Adelaide
- In office July 2014 – November 2014
- Preceded by: Robert Hill
- Succeeded by: Kevin Scarce

Personal details
- Born: Dianne Margaret Davidson

Dianne Margaret Davidson OAM FTSE, commonly known as Di Davidson, is an Australian agricultural scientist, author, and former Acting Chancellor of the University of Adelaide. Davidson is the current Chair of the South Australian Murraylands and Riverland Landscape Board.

== Career ==
The primary focus of Di's career has been viticulture, culminating in her authorship of two books: A Guide to Growing Winegrapes in Australia (1992) and The Business of Vineyards (2001). She owns properties at Langhorne Creek and in the Adelaide Hills and manages a consultancy firm called Davidson Consulting.

Davidson has served on a number of boards throughout her career. Previously she has been a director Horticulture Australia Limited, which manages research and development funding for Australia's horticultural sector, and has also served on the Premier's Climate Change Council in South Australia. She has worked closely on water policy reform since 2006, having served as a member of the Murray-Darling Basin Authority for nine years, with responsibility for crafting the Basin Plan, and being a Presiding Member of the former South Australian Murray-Darling Basin Natural Resources Management Board in 2019-20.

Davidson has had strong involvement in higher education administration. She has been a Fellow of both the Australian Academy of Technological Sciences and the Australian Institute of Agriculture, Science and Technology. She was a councillor of the University of Adelaide for 12 years, four of which she was Deputy Chancellor.

In 2015, she was appointed a Member of the Order of Australia for her services to the wine industry, horticulture management, and higher education administration.

== Education ==
Davidson obtained her Bachelor of Agricultural Science Degree from the University of Adelaide in 1969. She holds a Master of Science from James Cook University where she previously worked in the botany department. She also holds a Graduate Diploma in Business Administration from the South Australian Institute of Technology. She was a student of Seymour College where she later served on the Board in her adulthood.
