= The Goddess and the Bull =

2006 nonfiction book by Michael Balter

- Author: Michael Balter
- Language: English
- Publisher: Free Press (Simon & Schuster)
- Publication date: 2006
- Publication place: United States
- ISBN: 978-0-7432-4360-5
- OCLC: 883184058

The Goddess and the Bull: Çatalhöyük – An Archaeological Journey to the Dawn of Civilization is a 2006 popular science book written by Michael Balter. It is a "biographical" account of Çatalhöyük, a Neolithic archaeological site in Turkey, and its history of investigation: the discovery and first excavations at the site by James Mellaart in the 1960s, and the project directed by Ian Hodder that was ongoing at the time the book was written. The book received positive reviews in both popular magazines and academic journals.
