= Bettison =

Bettison is a surname. Notable people with it include:

- Jim Bettison (Irvine James Bettison), Australian philanthropist, whose estate funds the Adelaide Film Festival's Bettison & James Award
- Norman Bettison (born 1956), English police officer
- Oscar Bettison (born 1975), British/American composer
- Zoe Bettison, Australian politician

== See also ==
- Bettison's Folly, tower in Hornsea, East Riding of Yorkshire, England
