= Michael Balter =

American science journalist

Michael Balter is an American science journalist. His writings primarily cover anthropology, archaeology, mental health and sexual harassment in science.

Balter was a correspondent for Science magazine for over 25 years, before being controversially dismissed in 2016. He has also written for Scientific American, Audubon, The Verge, LA Weekly, the Los Angeles Times, and Los Angeles magazine, and taught journalism at New York University, Boston University and City College of New York.

== Education and early career ==
Born on the Alaskan Aleutian Islands, Balter grew up in Los Angeles and studied at the University of California, Los Angeles and San Jose State University. He obtained his master's degree in biology from UCLA in 1977. As a student, Balter was involved in far-left politics and especially the movement opposing the Vietnam War. He was conscripted into the US Army and stationed at Fort Ord, where he and other members of the radical Progressive Labor Party, which aimed to "subvert and destroy [the military] from within", attempted to organize resistance to the war amongst soldiers. He was court-martialed twice, once for distributing anti-war literature, and once for disrupting a training exercise.

Balter began his journalism career writing for newspapers based in Los Angeles, including LA Weekly, the Los Angeles Times, and Los Angeles magazine. In the 1990s he relocated to Paris, where he was a foreign correspondent for several American newspapers and magazines, and began writing for Science magazine.

== Science journalism ==
Balter's 2006 book The Goddess and the Bull describes the Neolithic archaeological site of Çatalhöyük in Turkey and the major excavations that have taken place their since the 1960s. It received positive reviews in both popular magazines and academic journals.

=== Science magazine ===
Balter wrote for Science for over 25 years, primarily covering anthropology and archaeology. He was the chief of its Paris bureau between 1993 and 2002. His contract with Science was terminated in 2016, shortly after he wrote a piece about allegations of sexual misconduct against American anthropologist Brian Richmond. Balter claimed that his dismissal was in reaction to this piece, which was the subject of what he described as a "tense, sometimes bruising behind-the-scenes conflict with [Science's] editors". He also highlighted previous conflicts with the magazine, including a leave of absence he took in protest of its firing of four women, and a blog post he wrote that was critical of Marcia McNutt, its then editor-in-chief. The American Association for the Advancement of Science, which publishes Science, denied that the Richmond piece was a factor in its decision to terminate Balter's freelance contract with the magazine.

=== Reports on sexual harassment ===
Since leaving Science, Balter has worked as a freelance journalist. He writes about sexual harassment and the Me Too movement in science, often self-publishing these stories on his blog. He has also written for Scientific American, Audubon, and The Verge.

In 2019, he wrote about allegations of misconduct by French paleoanthropologist Jean-Jacques Hublin, leading to a boycott of the annual conference of the European Society for the Study of Human Evolution, of which Hublin is the president. In 2020, he was sued for defamation by UC Santa Barbara anthropologist Danielle Kurin, after Balter reported allegations of sexual harassment against her and her partner, Enmanuel Gomez Choque.

Balter was ejected from the 2019 meeting of the Society for American Archaeology (SAA) after he attempted to remove David Yesner, a former archaeology professor who had been dismissed from the University of Alaska Anchorage for "decades of sexual misconduct", from the conference venue. Balter had traveled to the meeting to appear on a panel on the Me Too movement in archaeology. The SAA was strongly criticized for its handling of the incident.

=== Resignation from the National Association of Science Writers ===
Balter resigned from the National Association of Science Writers (NASW) in April 2021, following a misconduct complaint submitted against him by eleven other members of the organization. He had been a member of the NASW since 1986. Following his resignation, he claimed that the due process of the NASW's investigation had been compromised and denied the misconduct charges against him.

== Selected publications ==
- Balter, Michael (2005). The Goddess and the Bull: Çatalhöyük – An Archaeological Journey to the Dawn of Civilization. New York, NY: Free Press. ISBN 978-0-7432-4360-5.
