= Adelaide Oval Stadium Management Authority =

The Adelaide Oval Stadium Management Authority (AOSMA) is a company whose directors and members are appointed equally by the South Australian National Football League (SANFL) and the South Australian Cricket Association (SACA). AOSMA is not a public authority. It was created in December 2009 as a non-profit public company limited by guarantee.

AOSMA manages, operates and maintains the redeveloped Adelaide Oval owned by the South Australian State Government and also the area closely surrounding the stadium (the precinct). AOSMA also provides various services as agent on behalf of the SANFL, SACA and promoters in return for a fee.

There was controversy in 2019 regarding the construction of a hotel attached to the east grandstand of Adelaide Oval that was funded by the State Government loan. Additionally there was controversy around the fact that surplus revenue generated by the new hotel would predominantly benefit the SANFL and SACA rather than the Adelaide Oval.

== AOSMA Executive ==
In the table below are the current AOSMA executive.

	Position
Kevin Scarce	Chairman
Andrew Daniels	CEO
Rob Kerin	Deputy Chairman
Andrew Sinclair	Board Member
Philip Gallagher	Board Member
Peter Hurley	Board Member
Louise Small	Board Member
Dean Marsh	Board Member
Rod Phillips	Board Member

== Distributions to SACA and SANFL ==
The AOSMA annually distributes a portion of its revenue raised every financial year to both the SACA and SANFL as part of the deal to redevelop Adelaide Oval.

AOSMA Distributions
Year	SACA	SANFL	Total
2014	$1.5m	$15.5m	$17m
2015	$3.7m	$15.7m	$19.4m
2016	$2.9m	$15.0m	$17.9m
2017	$3.6m	$16.9m	$20.5m
2018	$4.7m	$16.3m	$21.0m
