= Peng Shi =

Electrical engineer

Peng Shi is an Australian electrical engineer and academic. He is a Professor of Electrical and Electronic Engineering at the University of Adelaide, Australia.

== Education ==
Shi holds a Bachelor of Science in Mathematics from Harbin Institute of Technology, China

Shi's postgraduate qualifications include:

- Doctor Degree of Engineering, University of Adelaide
- Doctor Degree of Science, University of Glamorgan, UK
- PhD (Electrical Engineering), University of Newcastle, Australia
- PhD (Mathematics), University of South Australia, Australia
- Master in Engineering (System Engineering), Harbin Engineering University, China

== Awards and recognitions ==
- 2015: Fellow of the Institute of Electrical and Electronics Engineers (IEEE) for contributions to control and filtering techniques for hybrid dynamical systems.
- 2027: IEEE Lotfi A. Zadeh Award for Emerging Technologies for "contributions to artificial intelligence based robust control and filtering with applications to complex systems".
