= Riccardo Tossani =

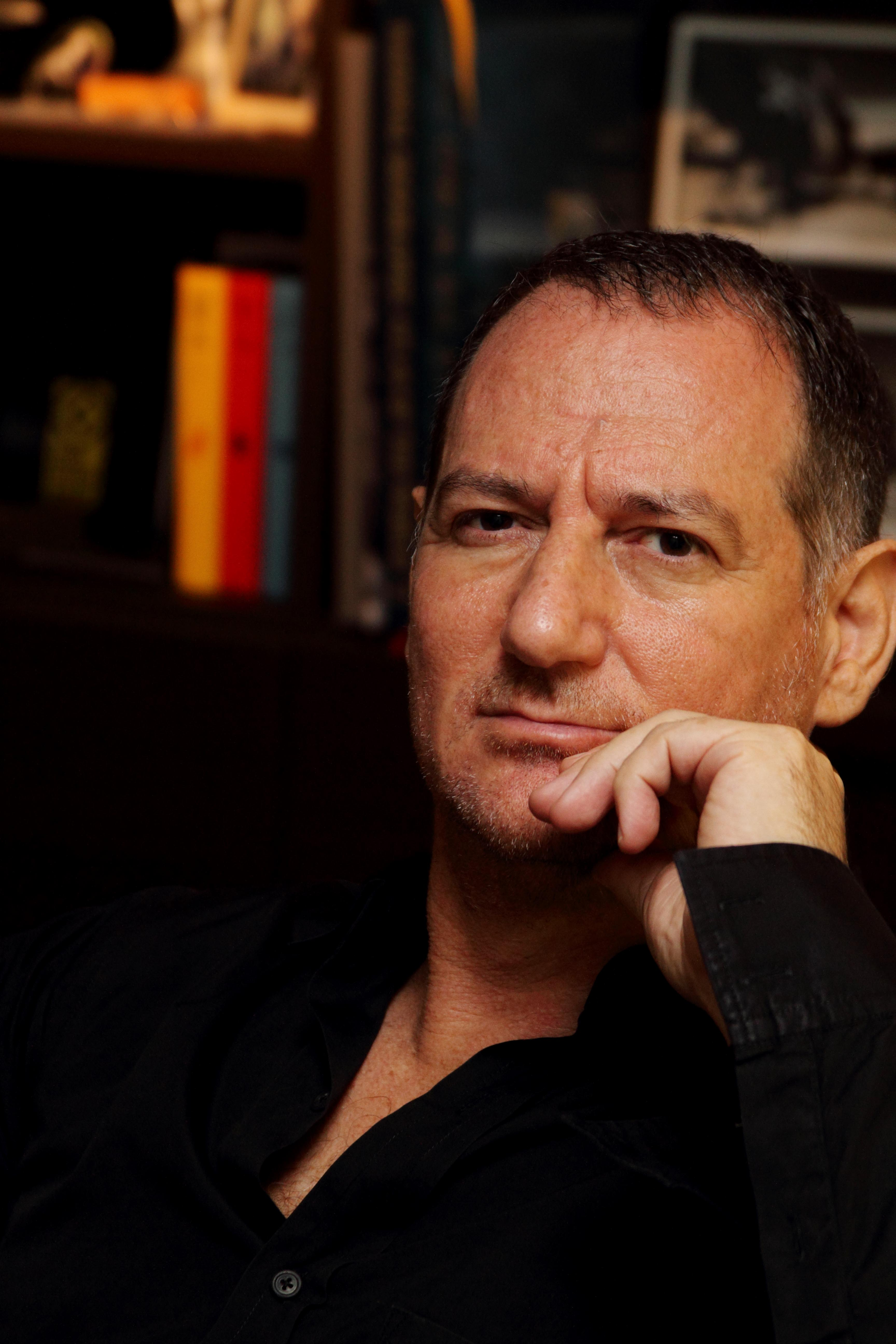
- Born: 20 July 1957 (age 69); Adelaide, Australia
- Occupation: Architect
- Practice: Riccardo Tossani Architecture
- Buildings: R Residence, Tokyo Akatsuki Resort, Koh Samui, Thailand Ring Chapel, Guam
- Projects: Giorgio Armani, Roppongi, Tokyo Hanazono Resort, Niseko, Japan Hirafuzaka Main Street, Niseko, Japan

Riccardo Tossani (born 20 July 1957) is an Italo-Australian architect and is the principal of the international design practice, Riccardo Tossani Architecture, based in Tokyo, Japan. Under Tossani's direction, the firm integrates architecture with interior design and urban design in a holistic approach to world-making in the Renaissance tradition.

Tossani is recognized for contemporary design and has produced a variety of works featured in international publications, has won several awards and has been active in hospitality, private residential and commercial sustainable architecture in Japan, Southeast Asia, Australia and Europe.

Tossani has been active in urban revitalization of rural communities in Japan with pro-bono consulting, and has co-authored a book on the government's response and recovery after Japan's 2011 tsunami in Tohoku. Tossani is an FAA instrument-rated private pilot.

== Education ==
As a scholarship student, Tossani formally studied Italian language and culture at the Dante Alighieri Society and developed a fascination with form and design, originally planning a career in aviation as an aircraft designer and aviator. Opportunities for pursuing those goals were limited in Adelaide so he chose to study architecture, graduating with Honours from the Bachelor of Architecture degree program at the University of Adelaide in April, 1981. There he developed a world view drawn from a strong focus on Italian history, culture and language.

While at university Tossani developed a strong interest in sustainable and environmentally appropriate design, enhanced by 18 months of work experience for architect Robert Marshall, controversial Mayor of the Shire of Eltham, Melbourne and Australian architect renowned for advancing the design of contemporary earth-built architecture.

Tossani later studied urban planning in Italy at the University of Florence, then moved to the US to consolidate with a Masters of Architecture and Urban Design degree at Harvard University Graduate School of Design, where he graduated with distinction.

== Early career ==
In December 1980, just prior to graduating from the University of Adelaide, Tossani founded his first practice in Adelaide specializing in contemporary residences and with a focus on environmental and thermal performance design, with projects featured in Adelaide media leading to a rapid expansion of his office, as well as invitations to lecture at local colleges on contemporary architecture and earth-building techniques. He soon partnered with prominent Australian architect Peter Villis to form the practice Villis+Tossani Architects in Adelaide. During the next several years of practice Tossani's interest in the nature of beauty in architecture as well as the complexity of design issues at larger scales in urban settings, compelled him to embark on a study tour of Asia, China and Europe from February 1984. During these travels, particularly in China, Tossani studied the confluence of politics, ideology and metaphysics in design thinking at all scales, and the application in this regard of the Renaissance notion of the architect as the multi-talented artist whose creative fluency spans multiple disciplines.

Intending to pursue these themes and broaden his expertise in architecture and Urban Design, he settled in Florence (Firenze), Italy, in September 1984 to work for the architecture and urban design practice of Arcoprogetti, a collaborative of professors of architecture from the University of Florence, nominally headed by Paolo Sica, architect of several notable contemporary works including the Ponte all'Indiano bridge over the Arno River. At Arcoprogetti Tossani participated in various design projects including the new science campus for the University of Florence with prominent collaborating architects including Norman Foster, Mario Botta, Richard Meier and Cesar Pelli, as well as the urban design of city precincts in Florence scheduled to be impacted by the Strada di grande comunicazione Firenze-Pisa-Livorno, an inter-urban motorway planned to bisect the city. Tossani also studied urban planning at the University of Florence, tutored architecture students at the Florence campus of Penn State and translated academic papers and Grazia Gobbi Sica's book on modern architecture in Florence.

In September 1986 Tossani moved to the U.S. to pursue a master's degree in architecture and urban design at Harvard University Graduate School of Design (GSD). Cross-registered at the MIT School of Architecture and Planning, he graduated at the top of his GSD class in 1988 earning a Masters of Architecture in urban design, with distinction and received the “Award for Greatest Overall Achievement in the Class of 1988 for Leadership and Excellence in Academic Studies”. Upon graduating from Harvard, Tossani turned down an offer to work on the Canary Wharf project for the London office of Skidmore, Owings & Merrill (SOM), choosing instead to relocate to Los Angeles to work for Scott Johnson and Bill Fain at Pereira Associates, (later renamed Johnson Fain (JF)), in order to pursue his interest in architecture and urban design in a city increasingly recognized for its avant-garde architecture and urbanism. At JF Tossani became the founding Director of the Guam office, and participated as architect and urban designer on a range of diverse projects including upscale residences, resorts in the South Pacific, the research campus for the Superconducting Super Collider in Texas as well as community and city master plans in Sacramento and Bangkok.

== Riccardo Tossani Architecture ==
Tossani relocated to Japan and established his own practice in Tokyo in 1997 together with his interior architect partner Atsuko Itoda. After receiving several awards, including the 1998–1999 Good Design Award (Japan) for "Villa Colonna", the practice grew rapidly to include major Japanese as well as international clients for projects in Japan, USA, Australia, Thailand, China and Italy. The office is active in the Hokkaido resort area of Niseko, having designed and master planned several hotels, resorts and private residences, as well as contributing pro-bono work such as the Hirafu Village Masterplan and the urban revitalization project Hirafu-zaka Main Street remodel. Placing great emphasis on sustainable design principles, Riccardo Tossani Architectures' philosophical approach and projects have been published globally and widely recognized for their aesthetic innovations as well as contributions to social and environmental design.

Tossani's multidisciplinary approach encompasses urban planning as well as building, interior and industrial design for residential, resort and commercial projects from Japan and Thailand to Italy and Australia. Many of the works by Riccardo Tossani Architecture have received multiple awards.

=== Major works ===
Tossani's works in Japan which have garnered the attention of the international press include the Roppongi Hills flagship store of Giorgio Armani the Omotesandō flagship store for the luxury Italian fashion brand GAS, private residences including the M-Residence, R-Residence, T-Residence, K-Residence, the Daizawa Residence as well as resort hotel and multi-residential projects including The Rocks Strata, The Rocks Edge and Forest Estate. Works also published internationally include the Ring Chapel, the Bougainvillea Chapel and Royal Beach Club at the Westin Resort in Tumon Bay, Guam and Akatsuki Resort on Koh Samui, Thailand. Tossani was appointed as the Master Architect for the Hanazono Resort in Niseko, Japan, following an international design competition hosted by Richard Li's PCPD (Pacific Century Premium Developments). Tossani has been appointed to the master planning committee commissioned by local government officials and business leaders to create a 10-year master plan for the beautification of Niseko, the neighbouring town of Kutchan and the countryside in-between, supported by $100 million in Japanese government subsidies. Tossani has since been instrumental in designing Niseko's most notable buildings as well as large-scale, private master planned resorts and public amenities, and with a satellite office in Hirafu Village remains very active in the area.

Tossani co-authored “Natural Disaster and Nuclear Crisis in Japan” published by Routledge in 2012, which now forms perhaps the most comprehensive analysis of Japan's triple disaster, contributing the chapter “Thousand-year event – Towards reconstructing communities“, an examination of the post-2011 Tohoku tsunami reconstruction policies and planning, required reading for Harvard University courses in Anthropology and History. All proceeds from this book go to charities for the Tohoku disaster victims.

== Philosophy ==
Tossani rejects the tendency of architects to specialize in limited functional categories, and instead subscribes to the renaissance notion of architecture as a multi-disciplinary vocation whose practitioners use their intellectual and creative skills to integrate building and interior design, urban planning and industrial design. Tossani's work is characterized by the use of a limited palette of carefully selected materials, simple yet innovative forms with emphasis on natural materials, space and light, as well as the incorporation of alternative energy sources where appropriate. Tossani's architecture strives for a positive engagement with the cultural and physical context, and is heavily inflected by metaphoric forms drawn from elements found in nature.

== Pro bono work ==
Tossani has created both the village master plan for the Niseko town of Hirafu in Hokkaido, Japan, as well as the Hirafu-zaka Main Street master plan, as part of an urban revitalization strategy for this rapidly developing international resort destination. Other pro-bono works include the concept design for Chabad House, a community center for the Chabad of Japan, Tokyo, Jewish community.
