= John Charles Hargrave =

Australian surgeon who worked on leprosy

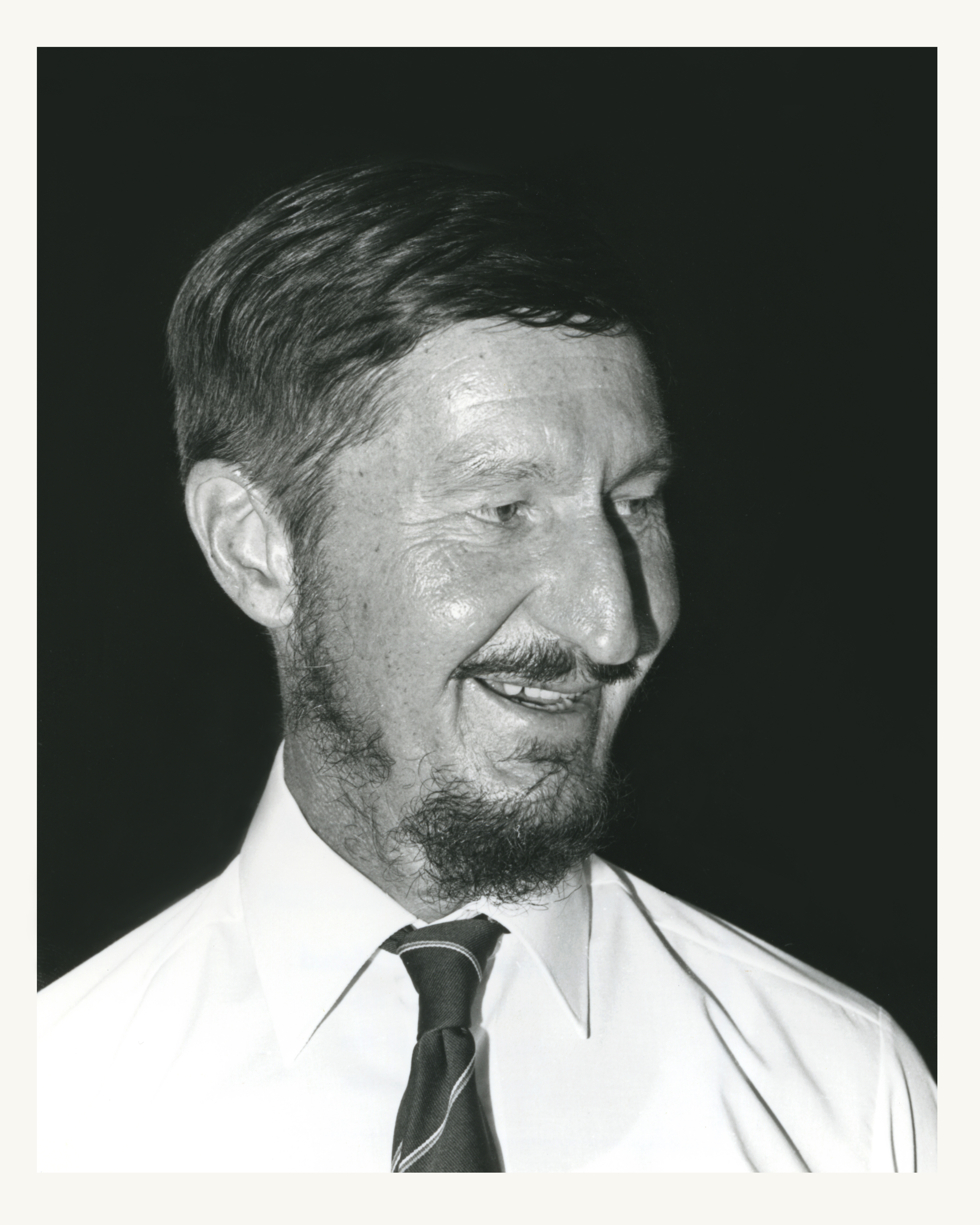
Dr John Charles Hargrave (Acknowledgement to Library & Archives NT)

John Hargrave AO MBE was an Australian surgeon whose work resulted in the near elimination of leprosy in the Northern Territory. In 1959, Hargrave was appointed medical superintendent of the East Arm Leprosarium, which replaced the leper colony known as Channel Island in Darwin Harbour.

During his 45-year medical career, Hargrave was a pioneer in the development of reconstructive surgery and microsurgery in the Northern Territory, Timor and Eastern Indonesia. He predominantly operated on deformities resulting from nerve damage in leprosy patients. He also performed the first successful digital re-implant in the Northern Territory, when he re-attached a young man's thumb, as well as the first free flap procedure to be performed at Darwin Hospital. Hargrave was one of the first surgeons in Australia to perform reconstructive surgery for claw hands.

When working as a survey medical officer based in Alice Springs in 1956, Hargrave conducted health surveys of all Aboriginal settlements and missions across the Northern Territory. As a result, he was the first to record, at a population level, the burgeoning crisis in Aboriginal health, including a vast number of treatable medical and surgical conditions.

In March–May 1957, Hargrave undertook a comprehensive survey of the Bathurst Island Mission and fully examined 713 people. He organised for 43 patients to be flown by the Aerial Medical Service into Darwin Hospital for chest X-rays. He achieved their cooperation by promising to do everything he could to ensure they were flown back to the mission on the same day.

In June–July 1957, Hargrave was medical officer on the historically significant Patrol to Lake Mackay. The government patrol set off in search of the nomadic Pintupi people, who had never before seen white people and whose tribal land was in the midst of a severe drought. When the patrol located the Pintupi people, Hargrave examined them and concluded they were 'in excellent condition, well built, well-nourished and healthy'. It is, therefore, 'a medical responsibility', he wrote in his report, 'that they be left entirely alone' and 'should be protected from further contact with white people, as this inevitably leads to their contracting diseases foreign to them.'

Leprosy was introduced into the Northern Territory from South-East Asia towards the end of the 19th century, and by the 1950s it had reached epidemic proportions among the Aboriginal population. In 1962, as the medical officer responsible for leprosy control, Hargrave established a reconstructive surgery program. Aboriginal people, who were hiding in the bush for fear of being forcibly isolated, began presenting for medical care and surgical procedures. By 1970, under Hargrave's guidance, leprosy was under control with only sporadic cases appearing. Hargrave, himself, described his work to eliminate leprosy as 'a concerted case-finding program, active treatment and the abolition of isolation (which was counterproductive since it made people hide)'.

In the late 1980s and early 1990s, Hargrave led volunteer teams of medical specialists and nurses to Timor where they performed reconstructive surgery on patients with deformities and disabilities arising from leprosy, poliomyelitis, burns and congenital defects. By 1995, his volunteer program had expanded to include interstate doctors and nurses, and Hargrave formalised it into the Australia South-East Asia Rehabilitation Foundation (ASEA Rehab). Today ASEA Rehab is known as the Overseas Specialist Surgical Association of Australia (OSSAA), and it provides specialist surgery to people living in the poorest regions of Timor Leste and Eastern Indonesia.

Among his colleagues and patients Hargrave was regarded as a pioneer for both Aboriginal health and surgery.

== Early life ==
John Hargrave was born in 1931 in Perth, Western Australia. He had one sibling, Barbara Kathleen Hargrave, who was born in 1928 and died after 2017 in Tasmania. John's father, Norman Hargrave, was born in Yorkshire, England and died in Perth in 1938, at the age of 41. At the time of his father's death, John Hargrave was seven years old. Hargrave's mother, Madeleine Hargrave, was born in Tasmania in 1896 and died in 1970 in London.

In his secondary school years, Hargrave attended Wesley College, Perth and, in 1947, was awarded the Lance Hunt Memorial Prize. He was dux and a prefect, and graduated with a first class pass in his final year at Wesley. In 1954, Hargrave studied a Bachelor of Medicine and Bachelor of Surgery at the University of Adelaide in South Australia. In 1987, he was awarded an Honorary Fellowship of the Royal Australasian College of Surgeons.

== Medical career ==
In 1956, Hargrave began work as a survey medical officer based in Alice Springs. In this role, he was also known as the first Aboriginal health officer in the Northern Territory.

In 1959, Hargrave was appointed medical superintendent of the East Arm Leprosarium near Darwin, which was operated by the Northern Territory Administration of the Commonwealth Government.

Between 1957 and 1959, pioneer nurse Ellen Kettle MBE helped Hargrave compile the first register of leprosy patients in the Northern Territory.

Hargrave set up an operating theatre at the leprosarium in 1962, where he was the first surgeon in Australia to perform reconstructive surgery on leprosy patients. He described the role of reconstructive surgery in correcting deformity as 'important to leprosy control because it gave people hope and was targeted at destigmatising the disease. It attracted patients who would otherwise have hidden in the bush'.

In 1962, Hargrave was awarded a World Health Organization scholarship and travelled to India to work under the renowned orthopaedic surgeon Paul Brand, who was a leprosy expert and a pioneer in the development of tendon transfer techniques. Hargrave trained in transplanting tendons and restoring movement to fingers and thumbs, and he put these surgical skills to use in the East Arm Leprosarium on his return.

By 1967, Hargrave had developed a specialised training course for the detection of leprosy and care of patients. The program proved so successful that, by 1981, it led to the closure of the East Arm Leprosarium amid recognition that leprosy was an illness that could be treated in the community.

In 1982, Hargrave was appointed director of the central office of the Division of Aboriginal Health in the Northern Territory Government. In this role, he was responsible for the formalisation of Aboriginal health worker training in the Northern Territory. He coordinated and oversaw the implementation of a policy that recognised the role of traditional Aboriginal medicine in health care, as well as community involvement in the training of Aboriginal health workers.

Also, in 1982, Hargrave was appointed a specialist hand surgeon at the Darwin Hospital and continued to provide medical care and surgery. He learned to speak at least six Aboriginal languages, so he could communicate with patients across the Northern Territory. He also got a pilot's licence and flew his twin-engine plane around the state to visit his patients.

In the late 1980s, nursing colleague Ellen Kettle brought Hargrave's attention to untreated deformities caused by disease and congenital defects in the islands of Eastern Indonesia. This led Hargrave to investigate and then establish a new volunteer medical program, which continues today as the OSSAA.

Hargrave retired from the Northern Territory Health Service in 1995, and moved to Tasmania in the late 1990s where he built a house overlooking the Derwent estuary.

=== Relationship with Olive Pink ===
Olive Pink was a celebrated anthropologist, artist, and Aboriginal-rights activist who played a significant role in Hargrave's understanding of Aboriginal people, their culture, and tribal beliefs. Born in 1884 in Tasmania, Pink developed a friendship with Hargrave at the age of 72 when he contacted her and she agreed to meet him.

At the time, Pink had finally been granted land in Alice Springs to establish the Australian Arid Regions Native Flora Reserve. Hargrave was in his mid-twenties and embarking on his career as a medical officer at the Royal Darwin Hospital. The two became firm allies and friends, and wrote letters to each other for almost 20 years. Pink's handwritten letters to Hargrave are now part of a Private Deposit Collection at the University of Tasmania.

In 2012, Hargrave transcribed Pink's letters into a book From Yabbula to Yabbula: letters from Olive Pink to John Hargrave 1956 to 1974.

== Recognition and awards ==
- WHO Fellowship to study leprosy in South East Asia (1962)
- Member of the British Empire (MBE)(1967)
- Fellowship of the Royal Australasian College of Surgeons (1987)
- Order of Australia (AO)(1995)
- ANZAC Peace Prize (1996)
- Cincin Emas Klas 11, Nusa Terggara, Timor, Indonesia (1996)
- ESR Hughes Award (Royal Australasian College of Surgeons) for distinguished contributions to surgery (1999)
- Honorary Doctorate, Charles Darwin University
- Professorial Fellow at Flinders University
- Royal Australasian College of Surgeons International Medal (2007)
- Patron in Tasmania for the Menzies School of Health Research
- In 2021, the NT Aboriginal & Torres Strait Islander Health Worker & Practitioner Excellence Awards introduced its highest award, which is named the Dr John Hargrave Honour Roll.
- In 2022, the Northern Territory Minister for Infrastructure, Planning and Logistics approved the naming of the John Hargrave Building at the Royal Darwin Hospital.

== Health and death ==
In the 1970s, when Hargrave was in his forties, he was diagnosed with bipolar disorder. Surgical colleague Dr. Phillip Carson noted in the Royal Australasian College of Surgeon's obituary that Hargrave's "fortitude and productivity through the highs and lows of this challenging condition were both remarkable and inspirational."

Between the mid-1980s and early 1990s Hargrave had four operations on his back. Following these surgeries he experienced mobility issues.

Hargrave suffered from kyphoscoliosis, a disease of the thoracolumbar spine.

After moving to Tasmania in 2000, Hargrave was diagnosed with severe triple vessel coronary heart disease. He recovered well from surgery but, in 2013, he developed severe aortic stenosis and needed further surgery.

In 2009 and 2014, Hargrave suffered two major episodes of pneumonia and on one of these occasions he required thoracic surgical intervention.

In September 2019, Hargrave underwent complex redo heart surgery and recovered well, despite a postoperative bleeding duodenal ulcer. His lung issues recurred in April 2020, and he was admitted to hospital and then re-admitted within a month of being discharged.

In August 2020, Hargrave checked himself into the palliative care unit of Hobart Private Hospital. He died on 6 August 2020.
