= Pamela Martin (lawyer) =

Pamela June Martin is a South Australian lawyer, Deputy Chancellor of the University of Adelaide and a senior civil servant of the Government of South Australia. She is the Director of Commercial Advice in South Australia's Department of the Premier and Cabinet and was awarded a Public Service Medal "for outstanding public service in the provision of legal and commercial advice on major projects" in 2014.

== Career ==
Martin graduated from the University of Adelaide with a law degree in 1970. She started practising the following year and has continued to do so in private and public sectors. During her public service, Martin negotiated the Roxby Downs (Indenture Ratification) Act 1982 during the proposal to expand the Olympic Dam mine and negotiated an agreement between three governments and the private sector to build the Adelaide-Darwin railway. Other major projects she has worked on include the Hindmarsh Stadium and the relocation of the South Australian Film Corporation to the Adelaide Studios. She helped establish the Royal Institution of Australia (RiAus) in Adelaide by negotiating with Australian and British governments and with Buckingham Palace. Martin helped negotiate the establishment of both UCL Australia and Carnegie Mellon University campuses in Adelaide during the Rann government.

== Memberships ==
Martin is a Director of the South Australian Film Corporation and member of its Finance and Audit Committee. She also serves on the Councils of the University of Adelaide and the Walford Anglican School for Girls. She is also a member of the Heritage Foundation Working Party at the University of Adelaide. Martin joined the board of the South Australian Museum in 2013-14.

== Personal life ==
Martin graduated from Walford Anglican School for Girls in 1963, where she was Head Prefect.
