= Ranks and insignia of the other ranks of the Australian Army =

Like the British Army, the Australian Army does not use the term 'enlisted' to describe its non-commissioned ranks. Instead, personnel who are not commissioned officers are referred to as other ranks. These are soldiers, non-commissioned officers (NCOs) and warrant officers (WOs). Warrant officers are appointed by a warrant which is signed by the Chief of the Army. The insignia for non-commissioned ranks are identical to the British Army up to the rank of warrant officer class two. Since 1976, WO1s and the WO in the Australian Army wear insignia using the Australian Coat of Arms.

== Insignia ==
Rank insignia of the other ranks of the Australian Army
Rank group	Warrant officers			Senior NCOs	Junior NCOs		Soldiers	
ADF code	E-10	E-09	E-08	E-06	E-05	E-04	E-03	E-02
Insignia							No insignia	
Typical appointment	Regimental Sergeant Major of the Army	Regimental sergeant major	Squadron/battery/company sergeant major					
Rank	Warrant officer	Warrant officer class 1	Warrant officer class 2	Sergeant	Corporal	Lance corporal	Private proficient (Note: Private proficient is not an ADF rank, it is a proficiency point for which a higher rate of salary is provided. Private proficient simply means a private who has completed basic training, initial employment training and is proficient in his/her trade – generally spending twelve months "on the job" first. A PTE(P) soldier does not 'outrank' a PTE soldier for discipline purposes. However, a PTE(P) soldier (also known as a senior soldier/senior digger) may be made responsible for tasking and training of junior soldier(s) within their section. A PTE(P) soldier is equivalent to an able seaman in the Royal Australian Navy and a leading aircraftsman/leading aircraftswoman in the Royal Australian Air Force.)	Private (or equivalent)
Abbreviation	WO	WO1	WO2	SGT	CPL	LCPL	PTE(P)	PTE

== Ranks ==
=== Warrant officer ranks ===
- Warrant officer (WO) – E-9* – the rank held by the Regimental Sergeant Major of the Army (RSM-A), and introduced in 1991.
- Warrant Officer Class 1 (WO1) – E-9
- Warrant Officer Class 2 (WO2) – E-8

=== Senior non-commissioned officer ranks ===
- Staff Sergeant (SSGT) (Note: The rank of staff sergeant is being phased out of the Australian Army, as at 2022 there are 10 Staff Sergeants in the Army, all in the Australian Army Reserve according to latest remuneration tribunal figures.) – E-7
- Sergeant (SGT) – E-6

=== Junior non-commissioned officer ranks ===
- Corporal or bombardier (CPL or BDR) – E-5
- Lance corporal or lance bombardier (LCPL or LBDR) – E-4

Bombardier and lance bombardier are used by members of Royal Australian Artillery. All other corps use corporal and lance corporal.

=== Private soldier ranks ===
- Private proficient (PTE(P)) – E-3. Also used within the private equivalent ranks (Note: Private Proficient is not an ADF rank, it is a proficiency point for which a higher rate of salary is provided. Private proficient simply means a private who has completed basic training, initial employment training and is proficient in his/her trade – generally spending twelve months "on the job" first. A PTE(P) soldier does not 'outrank' a PTE soldier for discipline purposes. However, a PTE(P) soldier (also known as a senior soldier/senior digger) may be made responsible for tasking and training of junior soldier(s) within their section. A PTE(P) soldier is equivalent to an able seaman in the Royal Australian Navy and a leading aircraftsman/leading aircraftswoman in the Royal Australian Air Force.)
- Private (PTE) – E-2. This title is used by members of the following corps:
  - Royal Australian Army Dental Corps
  - Royal Australian Army Medical Corps
  - Royal Australian Army Ordnance Corps
  - Royal Australian Army Psychology Corps
  - Royal Australian Corps of Transport
  - Royal Australian Infantry Corps
  - Australian Army Catering Corps
  - Australian Army Intelligence Corps

Different rank titles are used by other corps. These soldiers hold the same rank as a PTE E-2 or PTE(P) E-3

- Musician (MUSN): AABC
- Signaller (SIG): Royal Australian Corps of Signals (Note: Referred to as a "Sig", e.g.: "Sig Smith")
- Gunner (GNR): Royal Regiment of Australian Artillery
- Trooper (TPR): Royal Australian Armoured Corps, Australian Army Aviation, Australian Special Air Service Regiment
- Sapper (SPR): Royal Australian Engineers
- Craftsman (CFN): Royal Australian Electrical and Mechanical Engineers (Note: A female soldier's title is craftsman, not craftswoman.)
- Patrolman: Regional Force Surveillance Units (RFSUs) such as the North-West Mobile Force
- Private Trainee (PTE TRN): Pre-completion of initial employment training – E-2
- Recruit (REC /PTE(R)): Members who are undergoing basic training, or initial employment training – E-1

Private (and equivalent) soldiers in the Australian Army are still commonly referred to as 'diggers'.

== Warrant officer appointments and special insignia ==
There are a number of appointments held by the senior warrant officers in the Australian Army. These are appointments, not ranks. In general, the rank of the incumbents of these positions is WO1, and they wear the WO1 rank insignia. Due to it having its own special insignia which is worn instead of the WO1 rank insignia, the Regimental Sergeant Major of the Army (RSM-A) (Note: The senior warrant officer in the Australian Army holds the rank of warrant officer (WO) and the appointment of Regimental Sergeant Major of the Army (RSM-A)) is unusual as it holds the unique Army rank of Warrant Officer (WO), which is senior to WO1 and equivalents.

Other appointments include:

- Academy Sergeant Major (ASM): One WO1 is appointed every 3 to 4 years to serve at the Australian Defence Force Academy as the ASM, the position is rotated between the Royal Australian Navy, Australian Army, and the Royal Australian Air Force.

Unit level appointments:

- Regimental sergeant major (RSM): The senior soldier in a regiment/battalion sized unit. Known as the RSM, even in units designated as battalions. RSMs hold the rank of WO1.
- Company/squadron/battery sergeant major (CSM/SSM/BSM): The senior soldier in a company/squadron/battery sized sub-unit. Holds the rank WO2.
- Artificer sergeant major (ASM): The senior soldier in a RAEME unit. Can be a WO1 or WO2.

== See also ==
- Australian Army officer rank insignia
- Australian Defence Force ranks
- Royal Australian Air Force (RAAF) rank insignia
- Uniforms of the Australian Army
