= Keith Briggs (mathematician) =

British mathematician

Keith Briggs is a retired mathematician notable for several world-record achievements in the field of computational mathematics:

- The most accurate calculation of the Feigenbaum constants, which was published in "A precise calculation of the Feigenbaum constants", Mathematics of Computation, 57, 435–439.
- The worst known badly approximable irrational pair ("Some explicit badly approximable pairs", Journal of Number Theory, 103, 71).
- The simplest known universal differential equation
- A significant number of contributions in the last 5 years to Sloane's On-Line Encyclopedia of Integer Sequences (search for briggs in OEIS). Many of these have involved major computations, such as the number of unlabelled graphs on up to 140 nodes.
- The computation of the longest sequences of colossally abundant and superabundant numbers, and their application to a test of the Riemann Hypothesis (Experimental Mathematics, 15, 251–256).

An article about him was in i-squared Magazine, Issue 6 (Winter 2008/9).

Briggs has Erdős number equal to two, obtained by his joint authorship of two papers with George Szekeres. One of these papers was the last published by Szekeres before his death, and Szekeres was Erdős' first co-author.

== Local history in Suffolk ==
He also studies the etymology of place-names, and Middle English etymology, phonology, and semantics (especially in East Anglia), as evidenced by onomastic data.

== Selected texts ==
- 1991 "A precise calculation of the Feigenbaum constants", Mathematics of Computation, 57, 435–439.
