= Pauline Carr =

Australian business executive and university chancellor

Pauline Carr FAICD
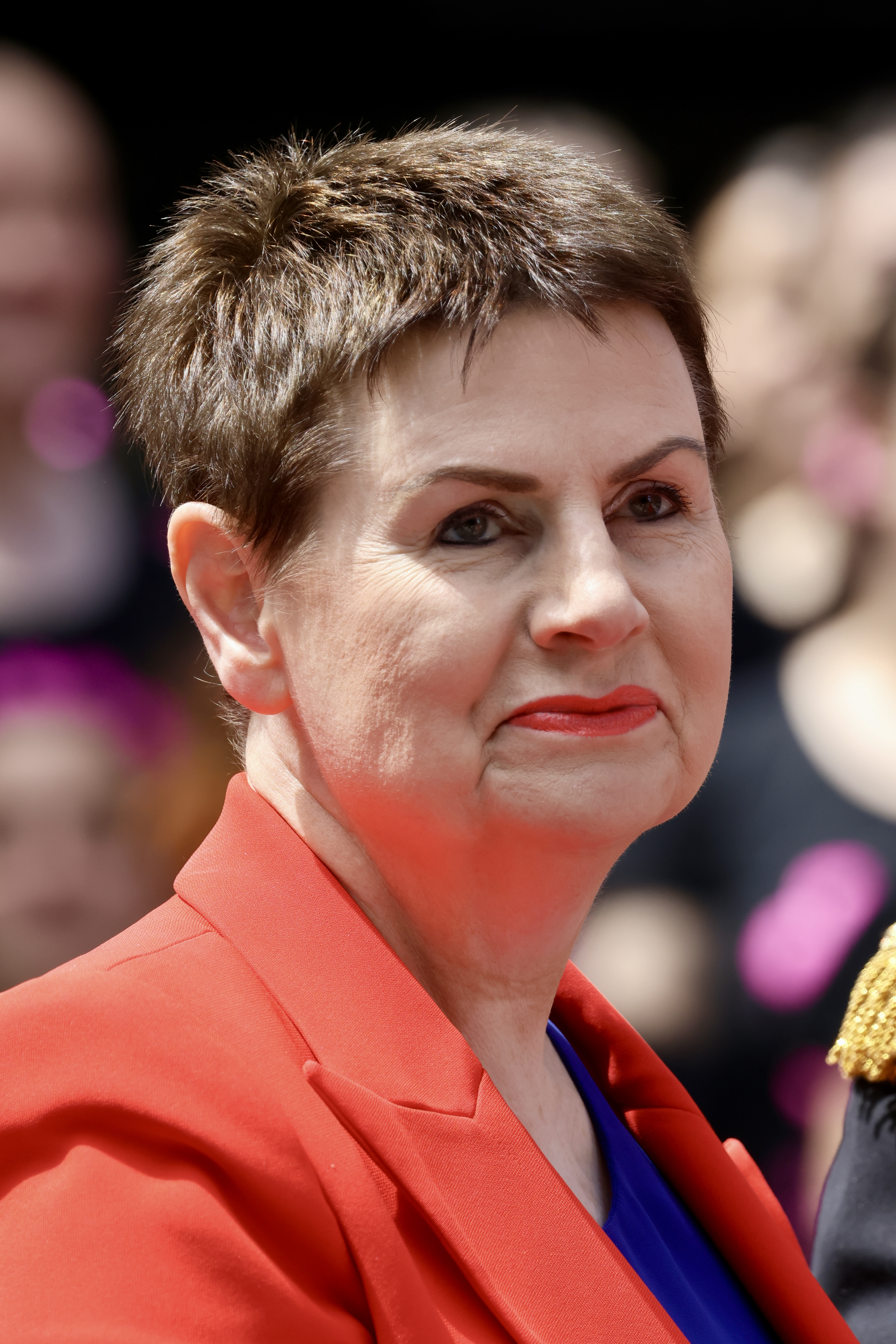
- Carr at the 2025 Adelaide Christmas Pageant

1st Chancellor of Adelaide University
- Incumbent
- Assumed office March 2024
- Preceded by: Position established

6th Chancellor of the University of South Australia
- In office September 2018 – May 2024
- Deputy: John Hill
- Preceded by: Jim McDowell
- Succeeded by: John Hill

Personal details
- Education: Australian National University (Bachelor of Economics); Master of Business Administration
- Occupation: Business executive, university chancellor

Pauline Carr is an Australian business executive and university chancellor who served as penultimate Chancellor of the University of South Australia from September 2018. In March 2024, Carr was appointed Chancellor of Adelaide University; a role she continues to hold following the institution's official launch.

== Early life and education ==
Carr was born in Australia. She holds a Bachelor of Economics from the Australian National University and an MBA.

== Career ==
=== Business career ===
Carr began her career at Esso Australia (now ExxonMobil). She later held senior positions in Newmont Asia Pacific. She has chaired National Pharmacies and served on the South Australian Government's Minerals and Energy Advisory Council, and she has been a non-executive director of ASX-listed Highfield Resources Limited and Australian Rare Earths Limited.

=== University governance ===
Carr joined the University of South Australia Council in 2010 and served as Pro Chancellor, before her appointment as Chancellor.

=== Transition Chancellor of Adelaide University ===
In 2023, the University of Adelaide and the University of South Australia agreed to merge, with legislation being passed by the South Australian Parliament. Adelaide University was established on 8 March 2024, with commencement of studies planned on 1 January 2026. Carr was appointed Transition Chancellor and took leadership of the Transition Council.
