= Adelaide University =

Public university in South Australia

Coordinates: 34°33′09″S 138°21′09″E

- Tirkangkaku (Kaurna)
- Motto: A university for the future
- Type: Public research university
- Established: 8 March 2024; 2 years ago
- Accreditation: TEQSA
- Affiliations: Group of Eight - CUIBE
- Chancellor: Pauline Carr
- Vice-chancellor: Nicola Phillips
- Academic staff: 3,133 (2024) (Note: This is a combined figure for both antecedent institutions and data may differ when compared to statistics taken at a different point in time.)
- Administrative staff: 3,822 (2024)
- Total staff: 6,955 (2024)
- Students: 64,391 (2024)
- Undergraduates: 44,539 (2024)
- Postgraduates: 18,656 (2024)
- Other students: 1,196 (2024)
- Location: North Terrace, Adelaide, South Australia, 5001, Australia
- Campus: Metropolitan and regional with multiple sites
- Colours: White; Dark Blue; Bright Blue; Limestone; Purple (Note: The colours "North Terrace Purple" and "South East Limestone" are shortened.)
- Sporting affiliations: UniSport; UBL
- Website: adelaide.edu.au

Adelaide University (Kaurna: Tirkangkaku) is a public research university based in Adelaide, Australia. Founded in 2024 and officially opened on 29 January 2026, it merged the University of Adelaide, the third-oldest university in Australia, and the University of South Australia (UniSA), which had an antecedent history dating back to 1856. Its two main campuses are located in the Adelaide city centre, one, City West, adjacent to the Adelaide BioMed City and near the Royal Adelaide Hospital, and the other, City East, located at the east end of North Terrace, near the Lot Fourteen tech precincts and containing the original University of Adelaide campus, with additional campuses located across its home state of South Australia.

The two antecedent universities' histories date back to the former Royal South Australian Society of Arts. The University of Adelaide was founded in 1874 by the Union College, with studies initially conducted at the Public Library of South Australia (now the State Library). The society was also the birthplace of the South Australian Institute of Technology (SAIT) founded in 1889 as the School of Mines and Industries. SAIT later became the University of South Australia during the Dawkins Revolution following a merger with amalgamated colleges dating back to the School of Art, also founded at the society. After a failed attempt to agree to a merger in 2018, the two universities agreed to merge in mid-2023. The combined Adelaide University was incorporated the following year and opened after two years of concurrent operations.

The university has seven campuses, including the combined flagship Adelaide city centre campus on North Terrace; a STEM-oriented campus in Mawson Lakes; the Magill campus specialising in social sciences; the Waite campus in Urrbrae; and regional campuses in Roseworthy, Mount Gambier, and Whyalla. Its academic activities are organised into six constituent colleges which are subdivided into 29 academic schools. It also manages several museums and exhibits, including the Samstag Museum and Adelaide Planetarium. It is a member of the Group of Eight, an association of research-intensive universities in Australia, and is co-located with the Australian Space Agency and various defence technology companies.

Alumni of the two antecedent universities include the first female prime minister of Australia, Julia Gillard; two presidents of Singapore; the first astronaut born in Australia, Andy Thomas; and the first demonstrator of nuclear fusion, Mark Oliphant. The two universities have also produced a combined 117 Rhodes scholars and 173 Fulbright scholars, and are associated with five Nobel laureates.

== History ==
=== University of Adelaide ===
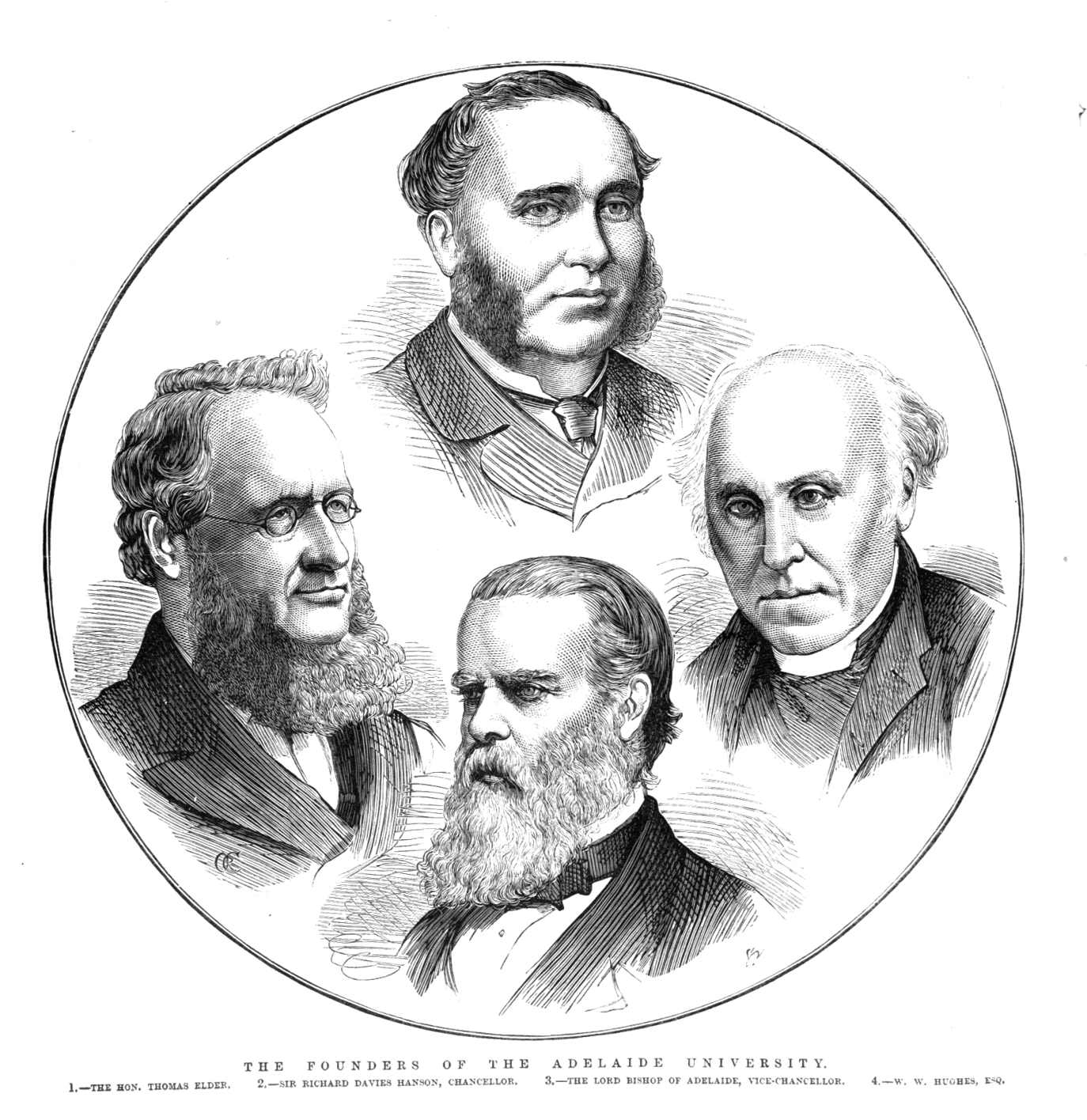
The founders of the University of Adelaide (1875 engraving)

The history of the University of Adelaide dates back to the Union College established in 1872 to provide education to aspiring Protestant ministers who were previously required to travel to the United Kingdom. The college approached Scottish-born pastoralist Walter Watson Hughes with the proposal for a South Australian university with a request for endowment towards its creation. Following an agreement, a university association was established by the Union College on 23 September 1872 to manage the creation of the university.

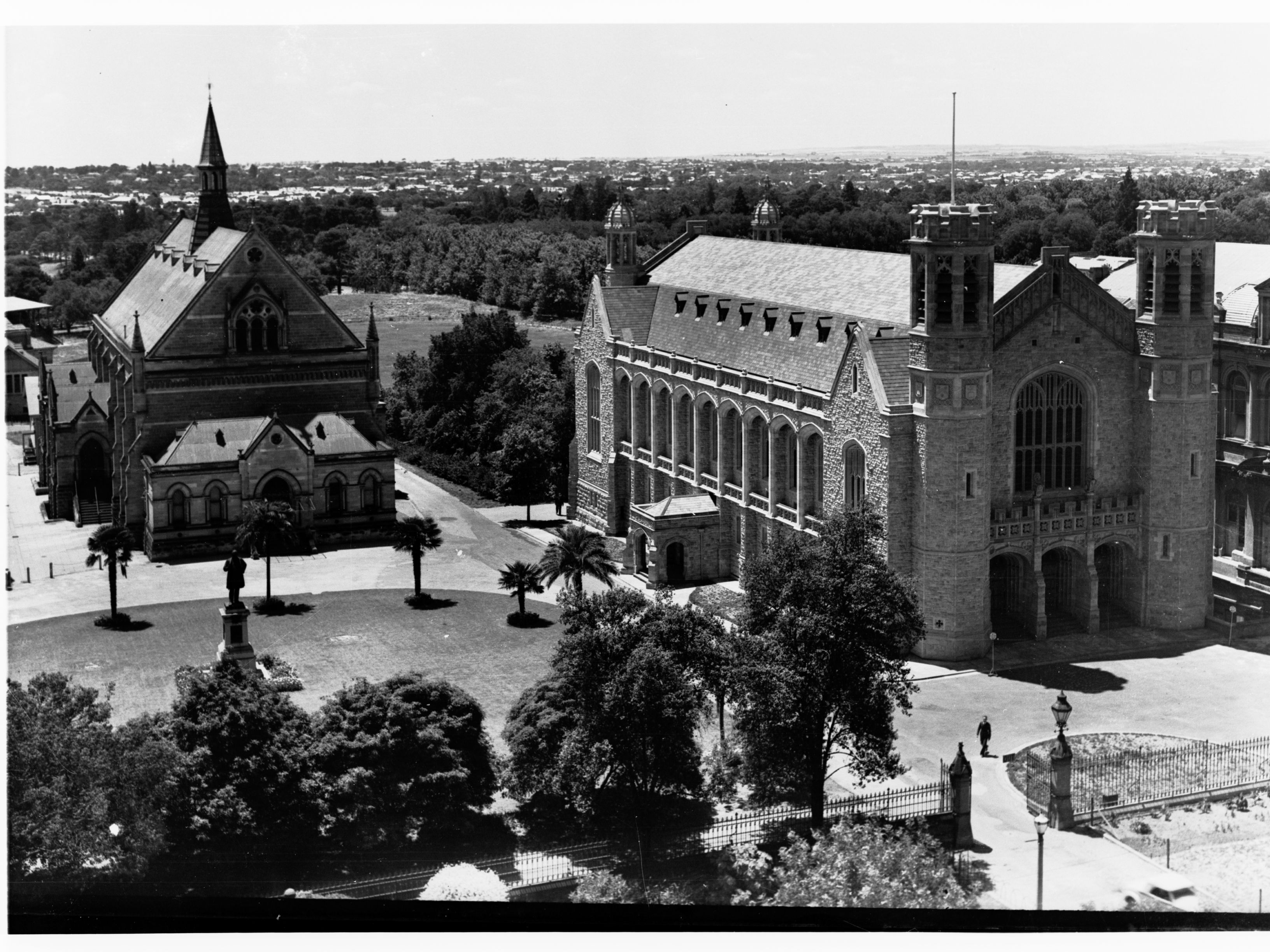
Elder Hall and Bonython Hall, its two great halls, in 1936

The University of Adelaide, which is named after its founding city namesake to Queen Adelaide, was formally established on 6 November 1874 following the passage of its founding legislation through the South Australian parliament. The parliament also provided a 2 hectare (5 acre) land grant for a campus. Its early benefactors, many of whom Scottish immigrants, made large donations to develop the university. The university has produced some of the Australia's earliest businesspeople, lawyers, medical professionals and politicians.

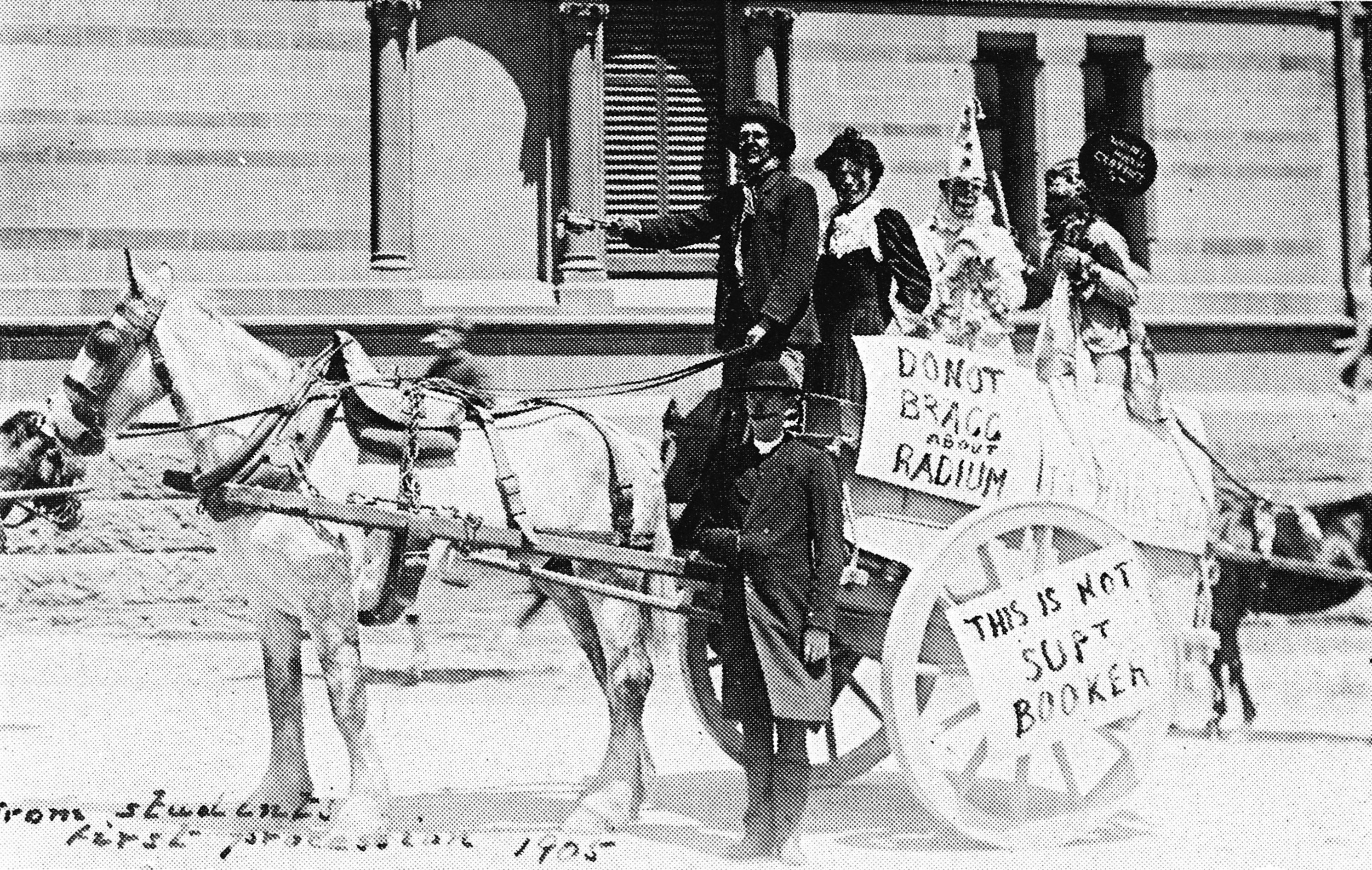
Students with satirical posters at the annual Prosh in 1905

It was founded with the backing of its first benefactor Walter Hughes and Thomas Elder, also a Scottish-born pastoralist and another founder of the university, who each donated £20,000 towards the association. The university initially occupied the South Australian Institute Building prior to the construction of the University Building which housed the entire campus at the time. Elder also bequeathed an additional £65,000 in his will following his death in 1897 of which £20,000 were allocated to set up the Elder Conservatorium of Music. Other donors include William Mitchell and Robert Barr Smith, also from Scotland and early leaders of the university.

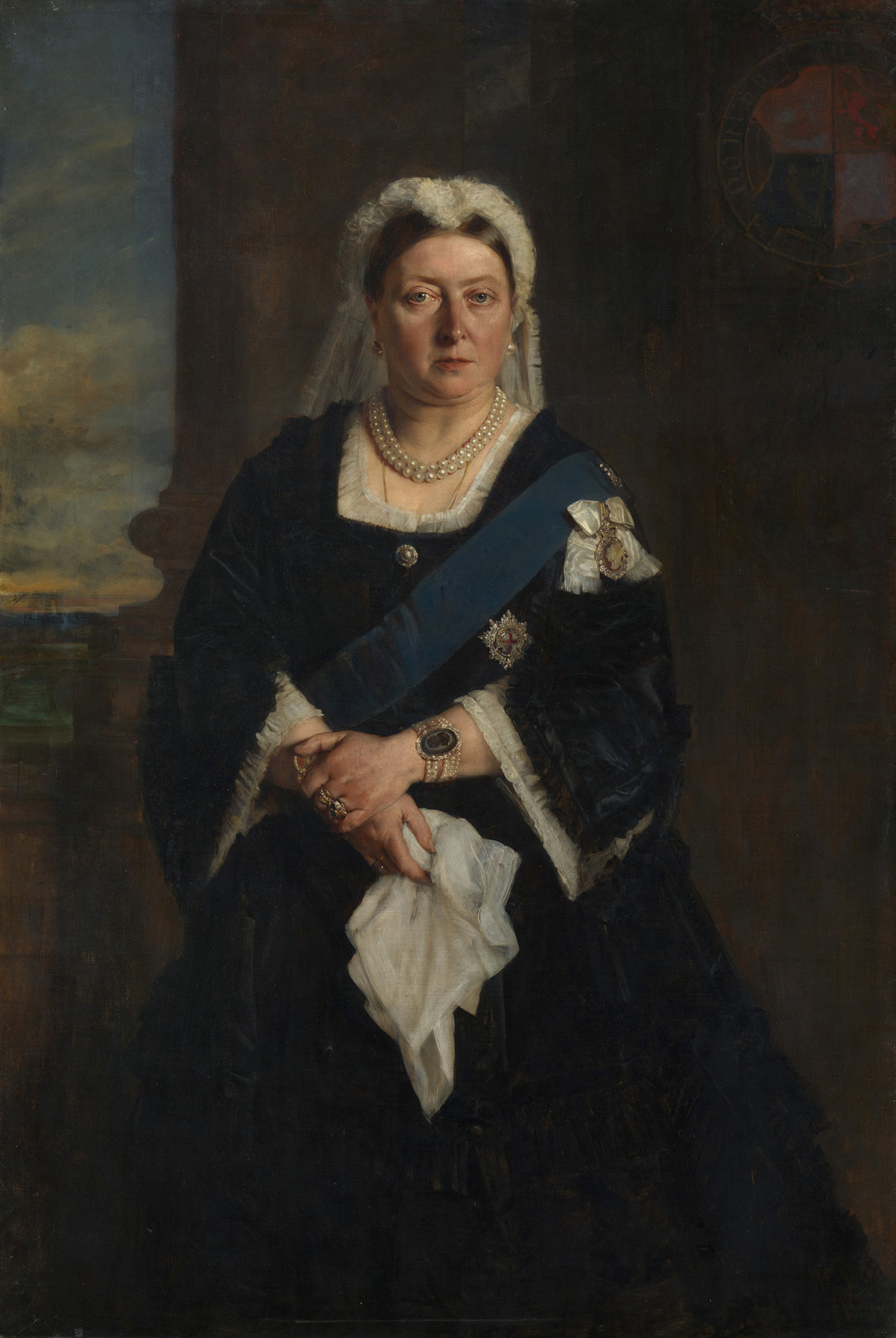
A royal charter grant by Queen Victoria allowed women to study at the University of Adelaide

The institution was the third of its kind on the Australian continent after the Universities of Sydney and Melbourne, which then educated solely men. The university, which allowed women to study alongside men since its commencement soon became the second university in the English-speaking world following the University of London in 1878 to formally admit women on equal terms as men in 1881. This was following a royal charter granted by Queen Victoria that year, which allowed for women to be conferred degrees. This has contributed to a number of firsts in the history of women's education in Australia.

Notable women include its first female graduate Edith Emily Dornwell who concurrently became the first person in Australia to receive the degree of Bachelor of Science in 1885. The university also graduated Australia's first female surgeon Laura Margaret Fowler in 1891. Ruby Claudia Davy was the first Australian woman to receive a doctorate in music in 1918. Other notable firsts also include Winifred Kiek, Margaret Reid and Janine Haines. In 1914, the university was also the first to elect a woman, Helen Mayo, to a university council in Australia. It is also the alma mater of Roma Mitchell who was Australia's first female judge, the first woman to be a Queen's Counsel, a chancellor of an Australian university and the governor of an Australian state. Australia's first female prime minister Julia Gillard had also studied at the university and the first Aboriginal Rhodes Scholar Rebecca Richards in 2010.

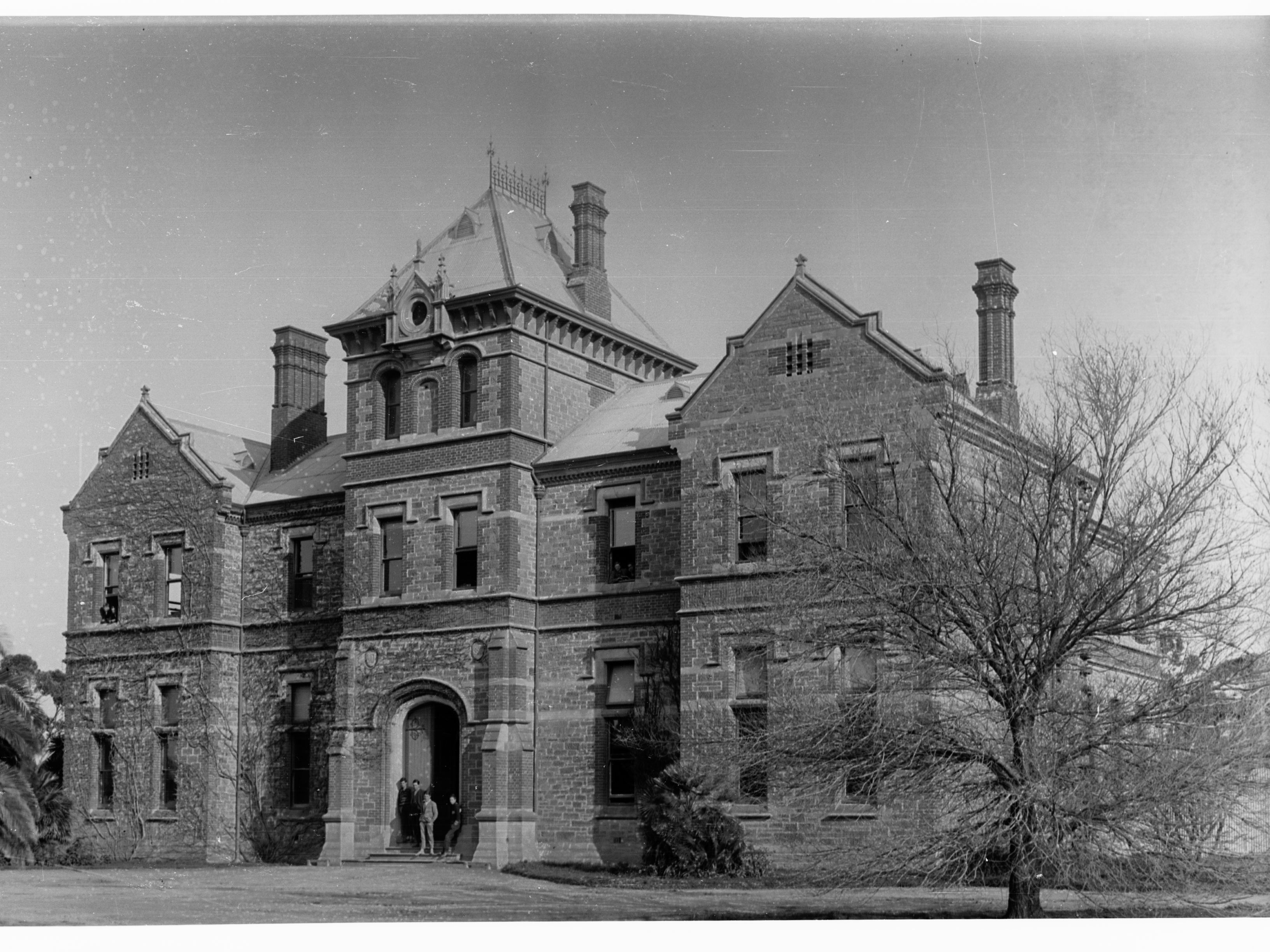
The Roseworthy Agricultural College established in 1883

In 1991, it formally opened two additional campuses in Greater Adelaide outside of the city centre. These included the Waite and Roseworthy campuses, though the university operated at the Waite site since at least 1924 as the Waite Agricultural Research Institute. The Roseworthy campus was the former Roseworthy Agricultural College which, although affiliated with the university since 1905, was an independent institution prior to their merger. Additionally, the university previously operated research facilities across 5 hectares (12 acres) in Thebarton approximately 3 km (1.9 mi) north of the campus until 2020.

=== University of South Australia ===
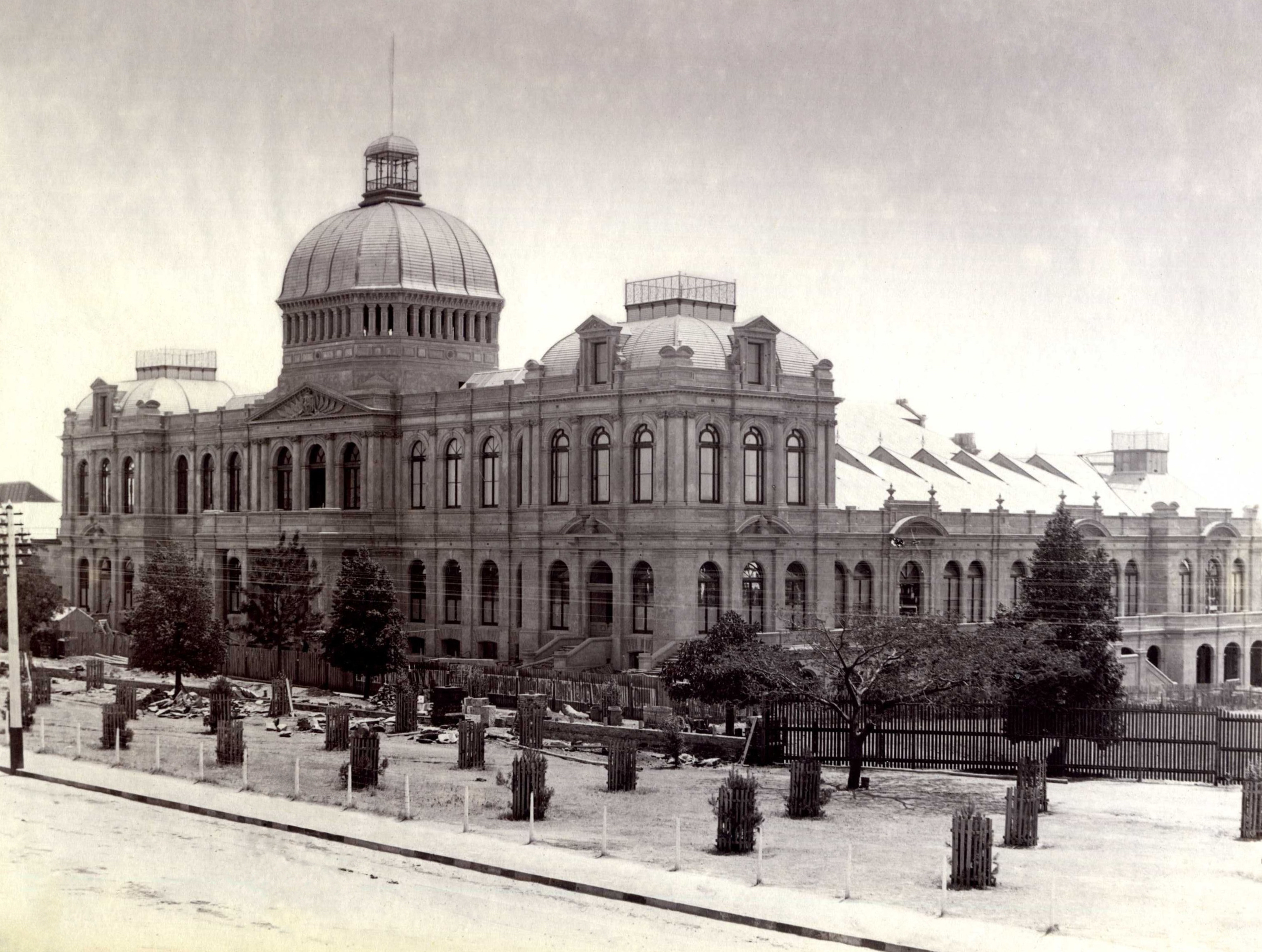
The now-demolished Jubilee Exhibition Building in 1885

The SA School of Art, the earliest antecedent institution of the University of South Australia, was established in 1856 at the former Royal South Australian Society of Arts. The independent art school, which went through many name changes, resided for most of its history at the Jubilee Exhibition Building which was later transferred to the University of Adelaide in 1929. It remained on the campus until 1962 when the building was demolished to make way for several university buildings.

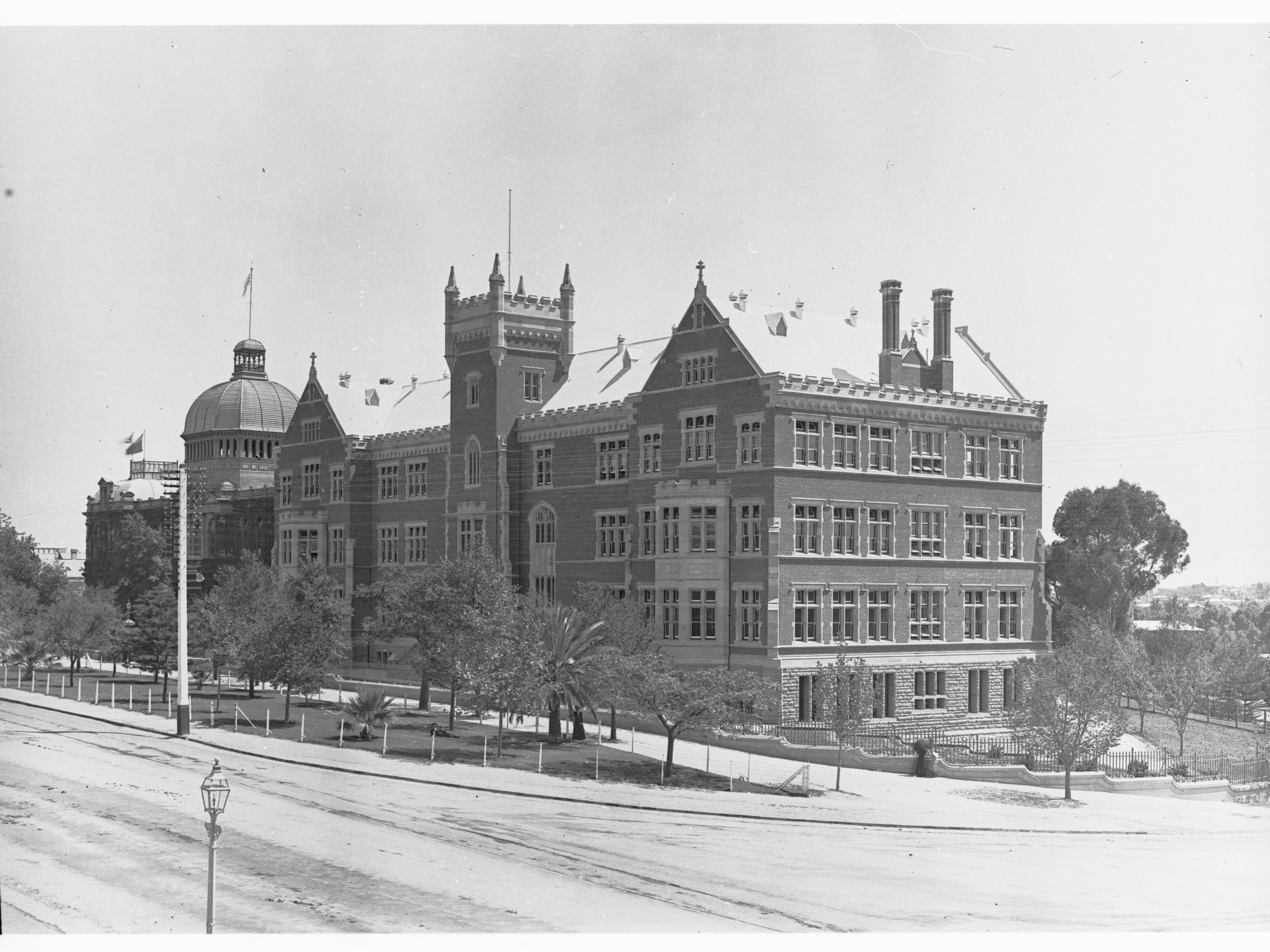
Brookman Building (1903) is the ancestral home of the University of South Australia

The Jubilee Exhibition Building was also the birthplace of the South Australian Institute of Technology which was established in 1889 as the SA School of Mines and Industries. It moved to the neighbouring Brookman Building in 1903, named after the Scottish-born businessman George Brookman who contributed £15,000 towards its construction. The institute maintained strong ties with the neighbouring University of Adelaide that included the co-ordination of teaching, laboratories and examinations across fields of engineering and sciences. Despite the university later establishing its own faculty of engineering in 1937, the reciprocal relationship remained intertwined to the University Council and studies completed at the institute were recognised as equivalent studies eligible for credit towards university courses. The institute later expanded to the regional city of Whyalla in 1962 and to the Adelaide suburb of Mawson Lakes in 1972 as The Levels. In 1965, it was designated an advanced college which initiated an expansion in the variety of courses available.

The Adelaide Teachers College, which changed names and shifted locations multiple times throughout its existence, was established in 1876. Despite not being located at the University of Adelaide campus until 1900, students from the institution attended university lectures since at least 1878. In 1921, it renamed to the Adelaide Teachers College, in line with other interstate teachers colleges. Despite offers from the university to take control of the college, which was heavily integrated into the university, the Education Department retained administrative authority throughout its early history. The Hartley Building was built as its permanent home in 1927.

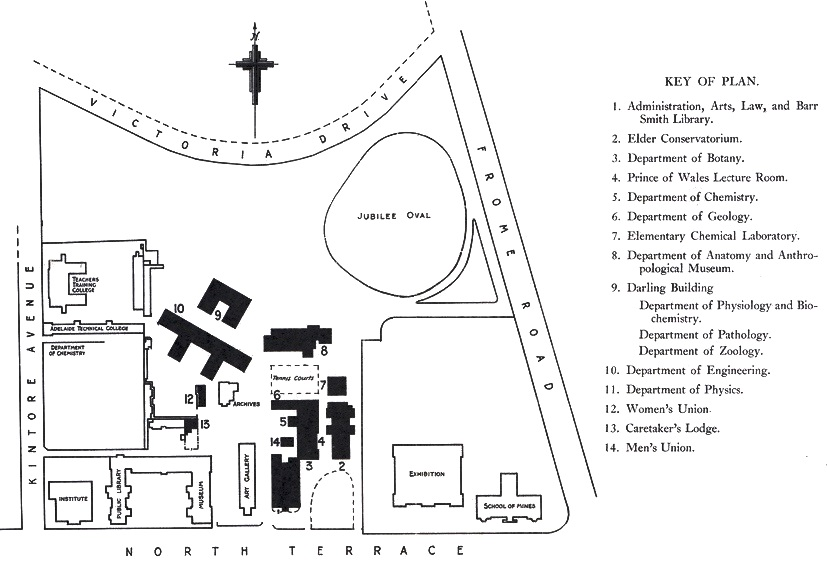
State of the university and its surrounding institutions in 1926

The college eventually renamed to the Adelaide College of the Arts and Education. It also established additional teachers colleges in other parts of the city including Magill. Following a series of mergers, the colleges expanded to become advanced colleges which all later amalgamated with the original mother college to become the South Australian College of Advanced Education in 1982. The combined institution continued its presence alongside the University of Adelaide with which it maintained joint teaching, facilities and committees. The campus merged with the university in 1991.

Stronger demand for advanced college places throughout the country resulted from a broadening appeal of higher education beyond the traditionally elite education provided by the universities. Advanced colleges were originally designed to complement universities, forming a binary system modelled on that of the United Kingdom. It was originally created by the Menzies government following World War II on the advice of a committee led by physicist Leslie H. Martin, during a period of high population growth and corresponding demand for secondary and tertiary education. This sector ceased to exist when, between 1989 and 1992, the Hawke-Keating government implemented the sweeping reforms of Education Minister John Dawkins that dismantled the binary system. The states, eager for increased education funding, merged the colleges either with existing universities or with each other to form new universities. Following its expansion and increasing autonomy from the university, the South Australian Institute of Technology was given the option to merge with either TAFE South Australia or the South Australian College of Advanced Education. It chose to merge with the latter advanced college resulting in the establishment of the University of South Australia.

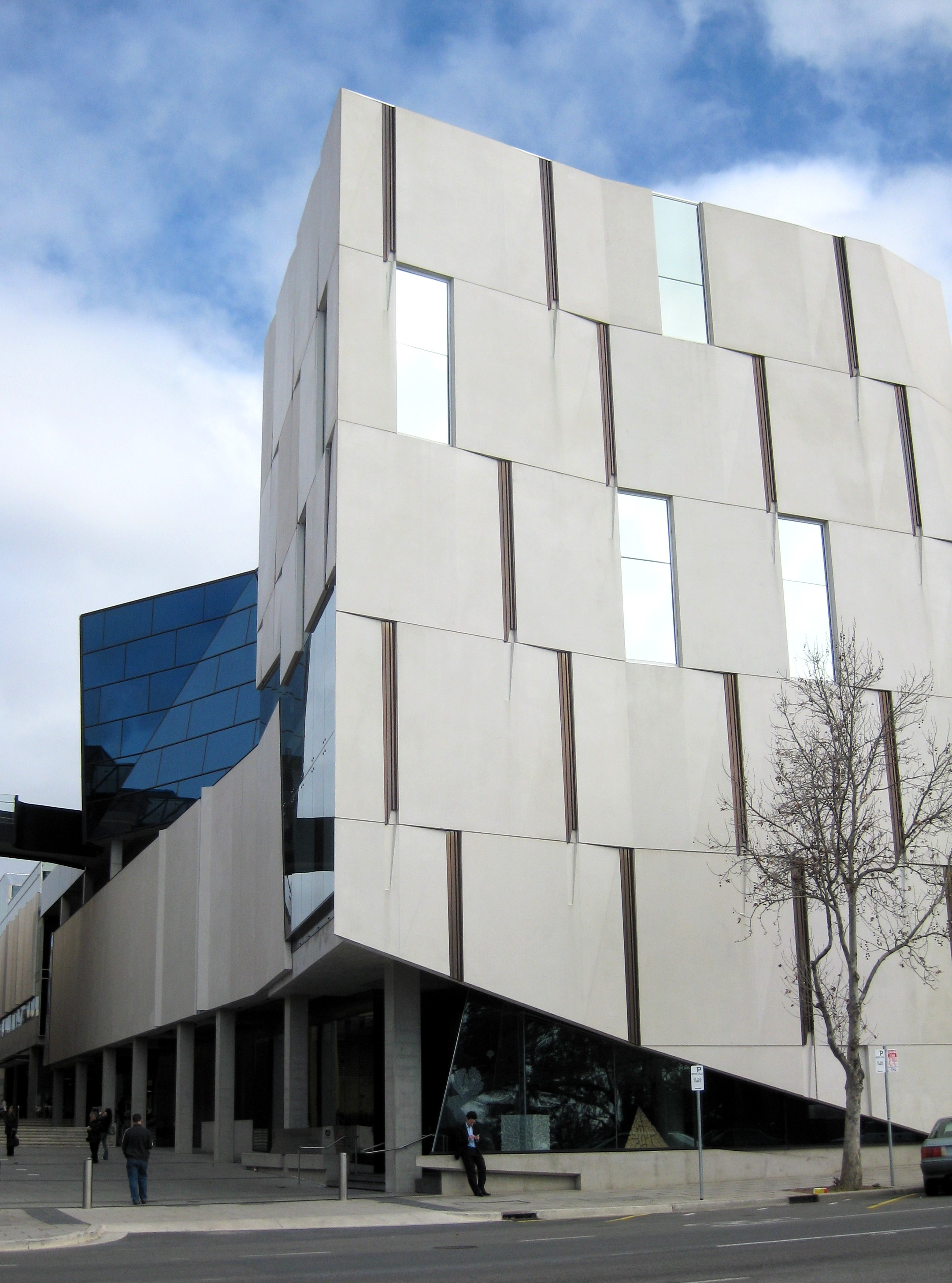
The Hawke Building is the chancellery of the University of South Australia on the west end

The University of South Australia became the state's third public university, a continuation of the former South Australian Institute of Technology that merged with most of the SACAE, and maintained their historical presence next to the University of Adelaide, in the suburbs of Mawson Lakes and Magill and in the regional city of Whyalla. Its expansion over the next few decades, including to sites on the west end of North Terrace, and broadening fields of studies contributed to its status as the state's largest university by student population. It also became the second-largest university nationally by number of online students, either in the state or from other parts of the country, and expanded to Mount Gambier in 2005.

=== Merger progression ===
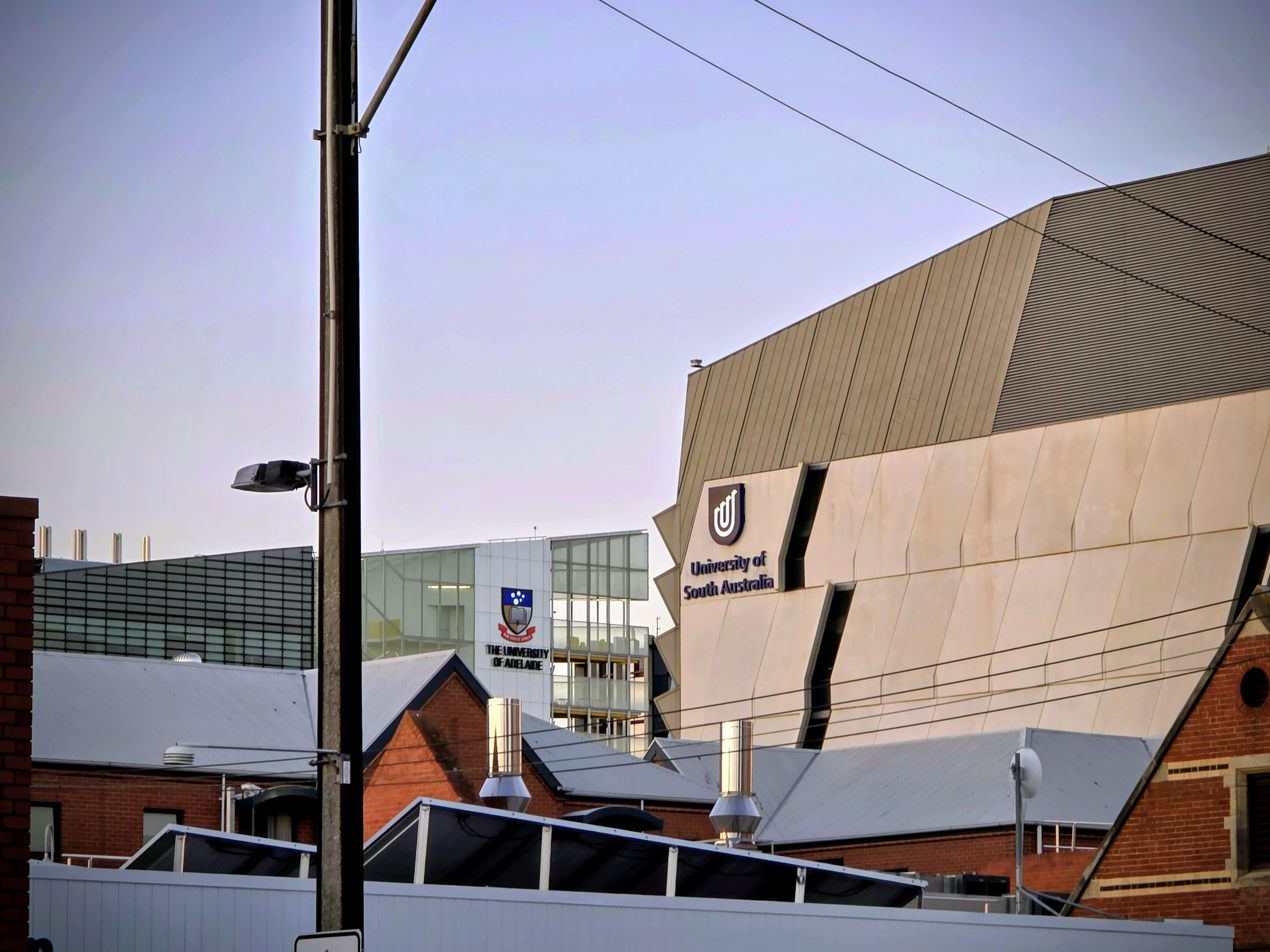
University of Adelaide Adelaide Medical School (left) and University of South Australia City West (right)

In June 2018, the University of Adelaide and University of South Australia began discussions regarding the possibility of a merger. The proposition was dubbed a "super uni" by then South Australian premier, Steven Marshall, and Simon Birmingham, but the merger was called off in October 2018 by the University of South Australia, which was less keen. Vice-chancellor David Lloyd, in an email to University of South Australia staff, claimed that the amalgamation lacked a compelling case. This statement was contradicted by the University of Adelaide's chancellor who said that the merger continues to be in the state's best interests and a spokesperson for the university added that it was still open to future talks. Following the release of several internal FOI documents retrieved by ABC News, it was later revealed that the merger talks failed due to disagreements on the post-merger institution's leadership structure. The name Adelaide University of South Australia was agreed upon by both universities and Chris Schacht, who previously served on the University of Adelaide Council, alleged that the merger talks failed due to disagreement on which vice-chancellor would replace the other following their amalgamation.

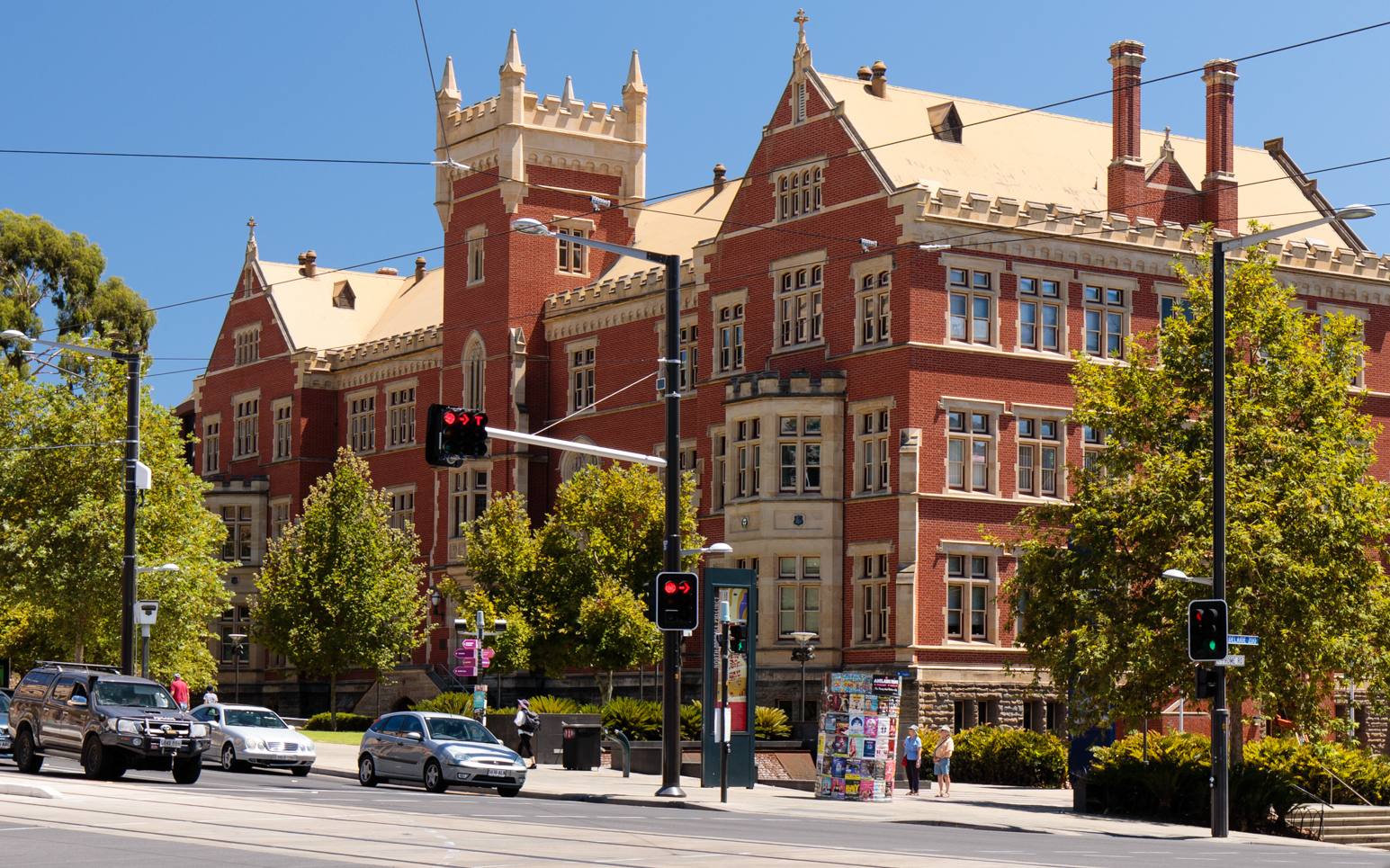
The University of South Australia's Brookman Building adjacent to Bonython Hall

In early 2022, the topic of a merger was raised again by the new state government led by premier Peter Malinauskas, which proposed setting up an independent commission to investigate the possibility of a merger between the state's three public universities should they decline. He had made an election promise to take a heavy-handed approach towards the merger to reduce students departing to higher-ranking institutions on the east coast and to improve the state's ability to attract international students and researchers. At the time, staff's opinions were evenly divided on the idea of the commission. Following the appointment of merger advocate Peter Høj as University of Adelaide vice-chancellor, both universities announced that a merger would once again be considered. The universities began a feasibility study into a potential merger at the end of the year. The invitation to merger negotiations was rejected by Flinders University, the state's third public university.

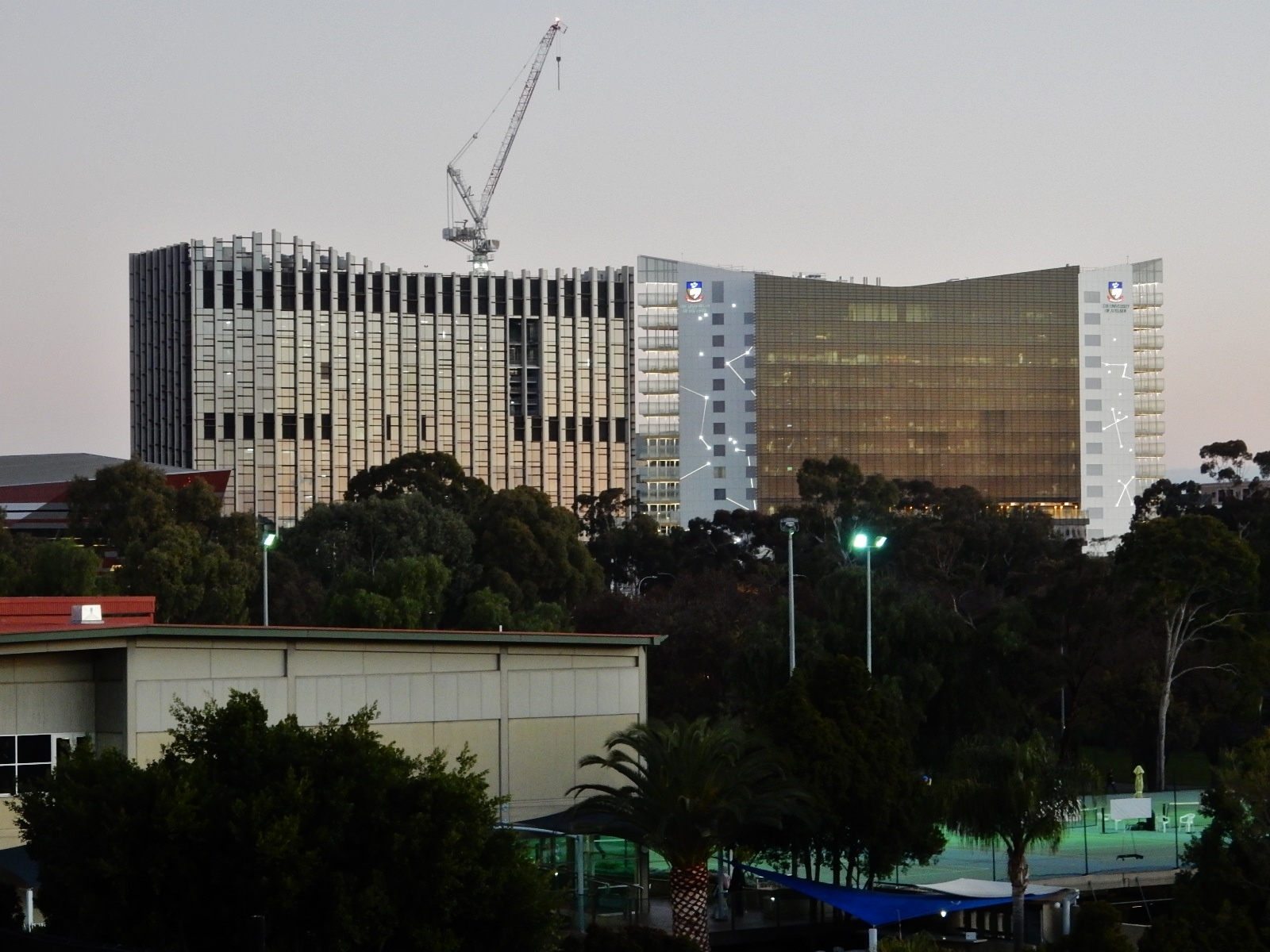
The University of Adelaide (right) merged with the University of South Australia (left) in January 2026.

The agreement for the merger was reached on 1 July 2023 by the two universities, which then accounted for approximately two-thirds of the state's public university population, in consultation with the South Australian Government. The rationale for the amalgamation was a larger institutional scale may be needed in order to increase the universities' ranking positions, ability to secure future research income and a net positive impact on the state economy. The two universities argued that by combining their expertise, resources and finances into a single institution, they can be more financially viable, with stronger teaching and research outcomes. Support for the merger among existing staff were mixed, with a National Tertiary Education Union SA survey showing that only a quarter were in favour of the amalgamation. Warren Bebbington, who previously served as vice-chancellor at the University of Adelaide, described the proposed institution as a "lumbering dinosaur" in reference to its timing during an ongoing federal review of the higher education sector. Vice-chancellor Colin Stirling described plans to provide the new institution with A$300 million in research funding and scholarships as "unfair" to students who choose to study at Flinders University. The combined figure was later revised to A$464.5 million to include land purchases, with an additional A$40 million research fund set up for Flinders University.

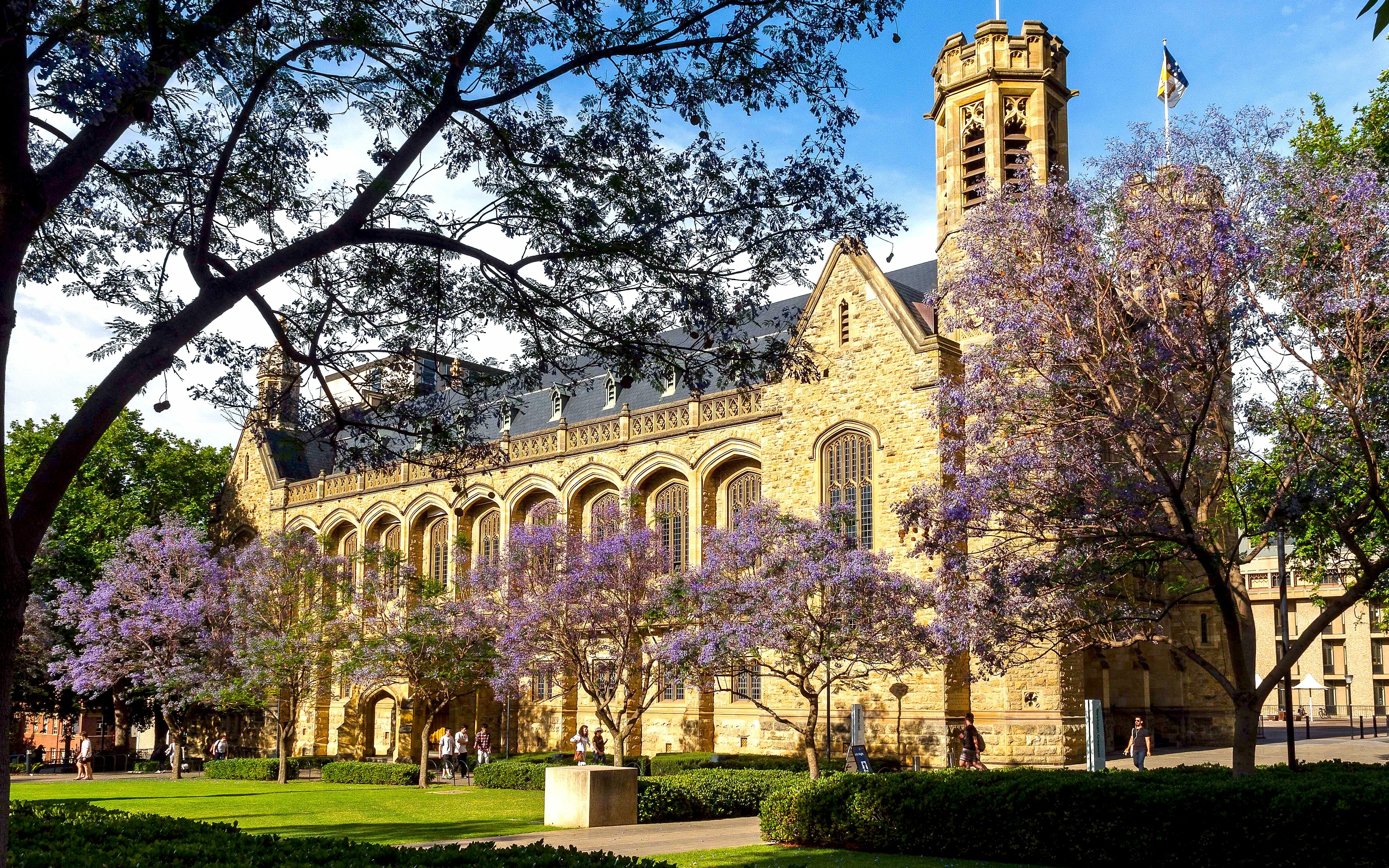
Bonython Hall adjacent to the University of South Australia's Brookman Building

In November 2023, legislation passed state parliament enabling the creation of the new university to be named Adelaide University, previously a colloquial name used by the University of Adelaide. An application for self-accreditation authority was submitted to the Tertiary Education Quality and Standards Agency (TEQSA) on 15 January 2024, which was needed for the institution to offer courses that issue qualifications. Following approval on 22 May 2024, students starting studies at the pre-merger institutions from 2025 onwards will be issued degree certificates from Adelaide University. Students enrolled on or prior to 2024 will also be able to opt in adding antecedent institutions' names and logos on their parchments. The combined institution is expected to become operational by January 2026, with an additional transitional period extending to 2034. It is projected to have 70,000 students at launch, with one-in-four students being international students, and contribute approximately A$4.7 billion to the Australian economy annually. The amalgamation has been subject to mixed reactions.

In June 2025, Nicola Phillips, previously provost and professor of political economy at the University of Melbourne, was announced as vice-chancellor and president of the new university.

On 18 July 2025, the university was assigned the Kaurna name Tirkangkaku, which means "place of learning". The name was chosen selected by elder Uncle Lewis Yarlupurka O'Brien in consultation with Aboriginal staff and UniSA's Purkarninthi Elders in Residence.

The completion of the merger to create Adelaide University occurred in January 2026. It officially opened its doors on 29 January 2026.

=== Official opening ===
On 29 January 2026 Premier Peter Malinauskas unveiled the plaque at the university's official opening, with vice chancellor Nicola Phillips and chancellor Pauline Carr alongside him.

== Campuses and buildings ==
The university inherited seven campuses from its antecedent institutions, including a combined flagship Adelaide City campus. They include:

=== Adelaide City ===
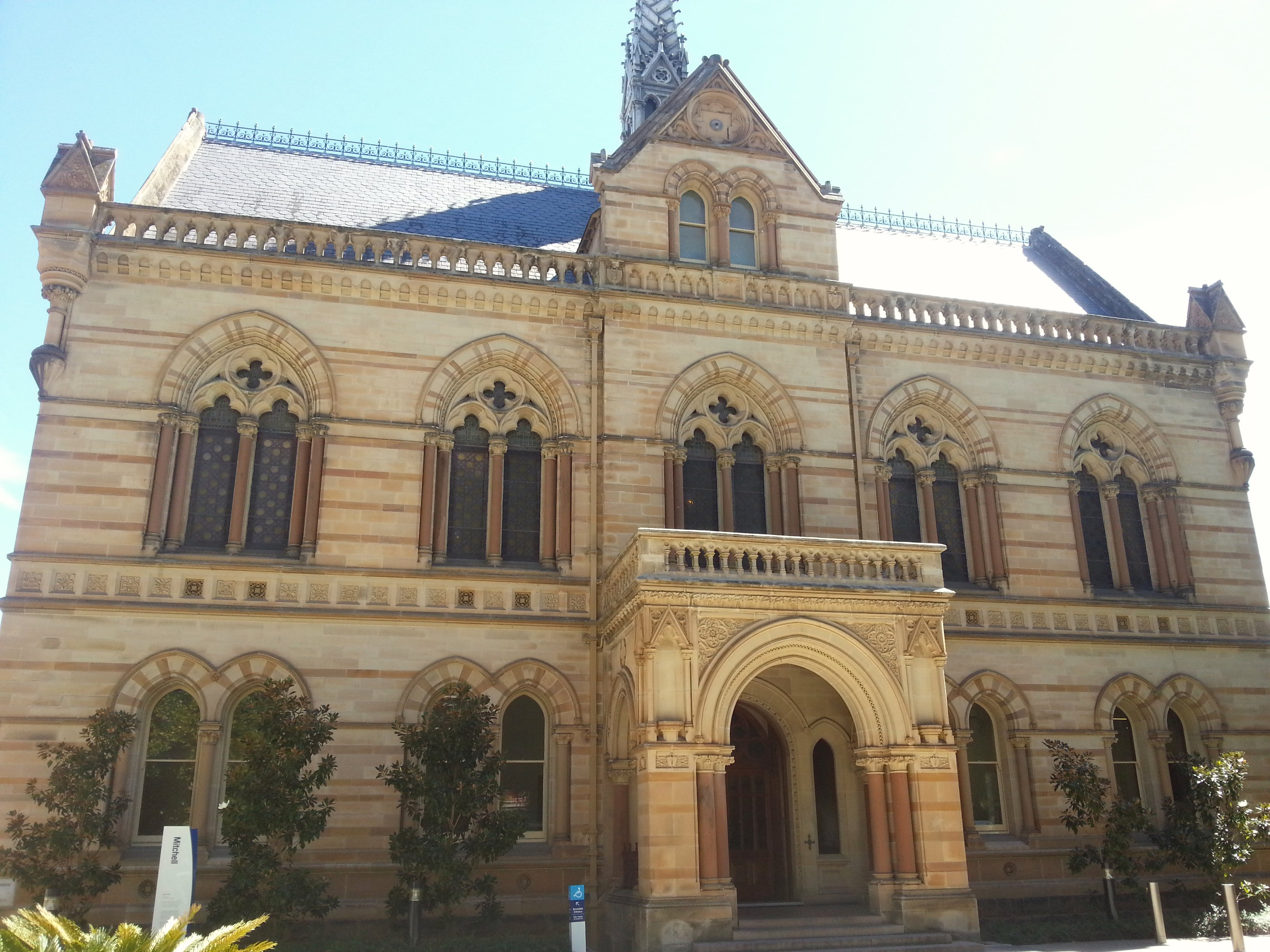
The Mitchell Building was completed in 1882 and is the oldest building on campus

The Adelaide city campus combines four adjacent campuses located across North Terrace, one of four terraces bounding the Adelaide city centre. On the east end of the terrace, the campus is co-located with the historical Royal South Australian Society of Arts which included the Art Gallery of South Australia, the South Australian Museum and the State Library of South Australia. Built in the Gothic Revival architecture style in 1882, the Mitchell Building is the oldest building on the campus. It was called the University Building until 1961 when it was renamed after William Mitchell. The Brookman Building, constructed in 1903 and named after its benefactor George Brookman, formed part of the original School of Mines and Industries later renamed to the South Australian Institute of Technology. It was inherited by the University of South Australia, which later expanded to the west end of the terrace.

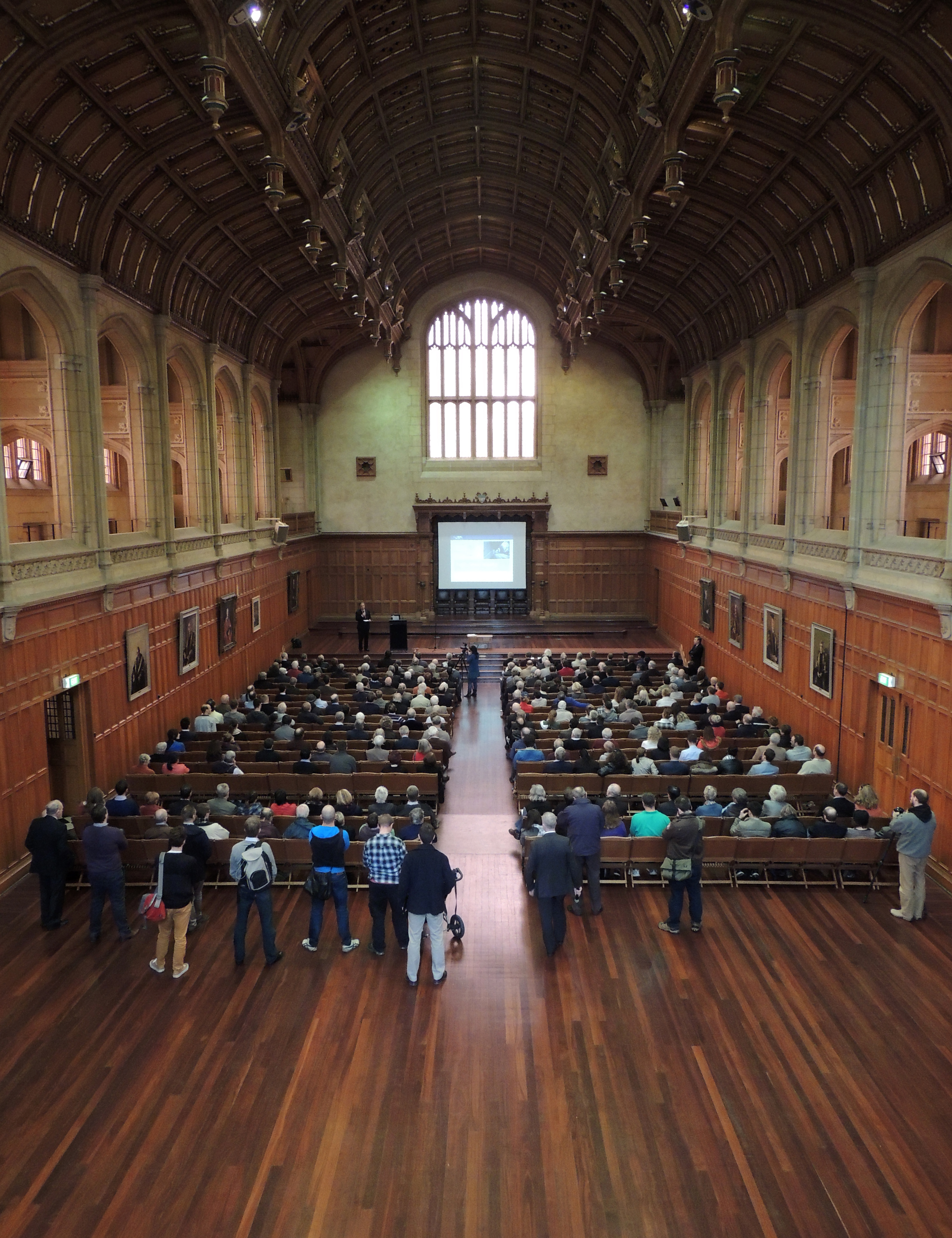
The interior of Bonython Hall, used for graduations, during a forum on nuclear energy

Bonython Hall, a great hall of the university, was built in 1936 following a donation of over £50,000 from the owner of The Advertiser newspaper, John Langdon Bonython, who was inspired following his visit to the Great Hall of the University of Sydney. The hall, which has been used during graduation ceremonies among other events, was designed by architect Louis Laybourne-Smith based on medieval great halls in a Gothic Revival architecture style inspired by the ancient universities in Europe. In between it and the Mitchell Building, which both face the terrace, is the Elder Hall which is its oldest great hall on the site. It is a large concert hall that is used by the Elder Conservatorium of Music among others and, along with Bonython Hall, both feature large organs.

The campus also includes other venues including the Scott Theatre, Little Theatre and the College Green. The Scott Theatre is the largest lecture theatre on site and is often hired out for performances of various kinds such as the Adelaide Fringe events. It features two revolving stages and a seating capacity of 635 people. The Little Theatre is located in the Cloisters and is primarily used for dramatic performances by the Theatre Guild. The College Green stretches from the Cloisters across the lawns down to Victoria Drive, next to the River Torrens. It hosts various social events throughout the year including parties, live bands, DJs and open-air cinema among others. It was created in response to the impact of social distancing restrictions owing to the COVID-19 pandemic in Australia, which hit many live music venues.

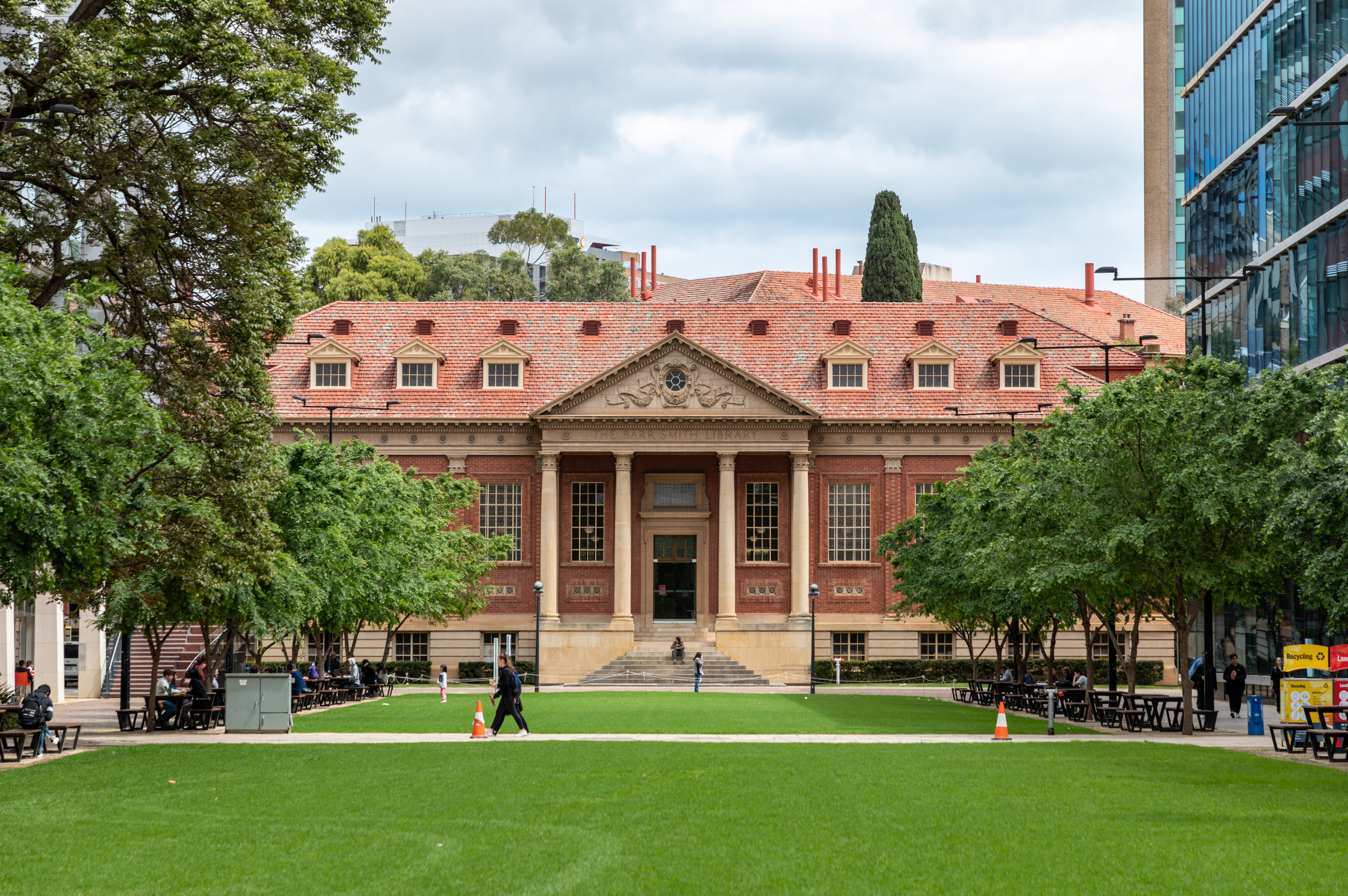
The Barr Smith Library on the main Adelaide campus

The Barr Smith Library is the largest library on the site and is notable for its opulent reading room. The Napier and Ligertwood Buildings were built following the demolition of the Jubilee Exhibition Building in 1962. They are named after Mellis Napier and George Ligertwood who were both former chancellors. Some other notable buildings on the east end of the campus include the Ingkarni Wardli Building, Darling Building, Hartley Building, Mawson Building, Playford Building, Basil Hetzel Building, Bonython Jubilee Building, Centenary Building and the Helen Mayo North and South Buildings. The A$100 million Braggs Building, named after two Nobel laureates associated with the university, was built in 2013 and features a large number of cross-disciplinary scientific research facilities. The Adelaide University Footbridge was constructed in 1937 following a decade of delays during the Great Depression. The footbridge, which crosses the River Torrens, features cast iron balustrading that is a popular location for love locks.

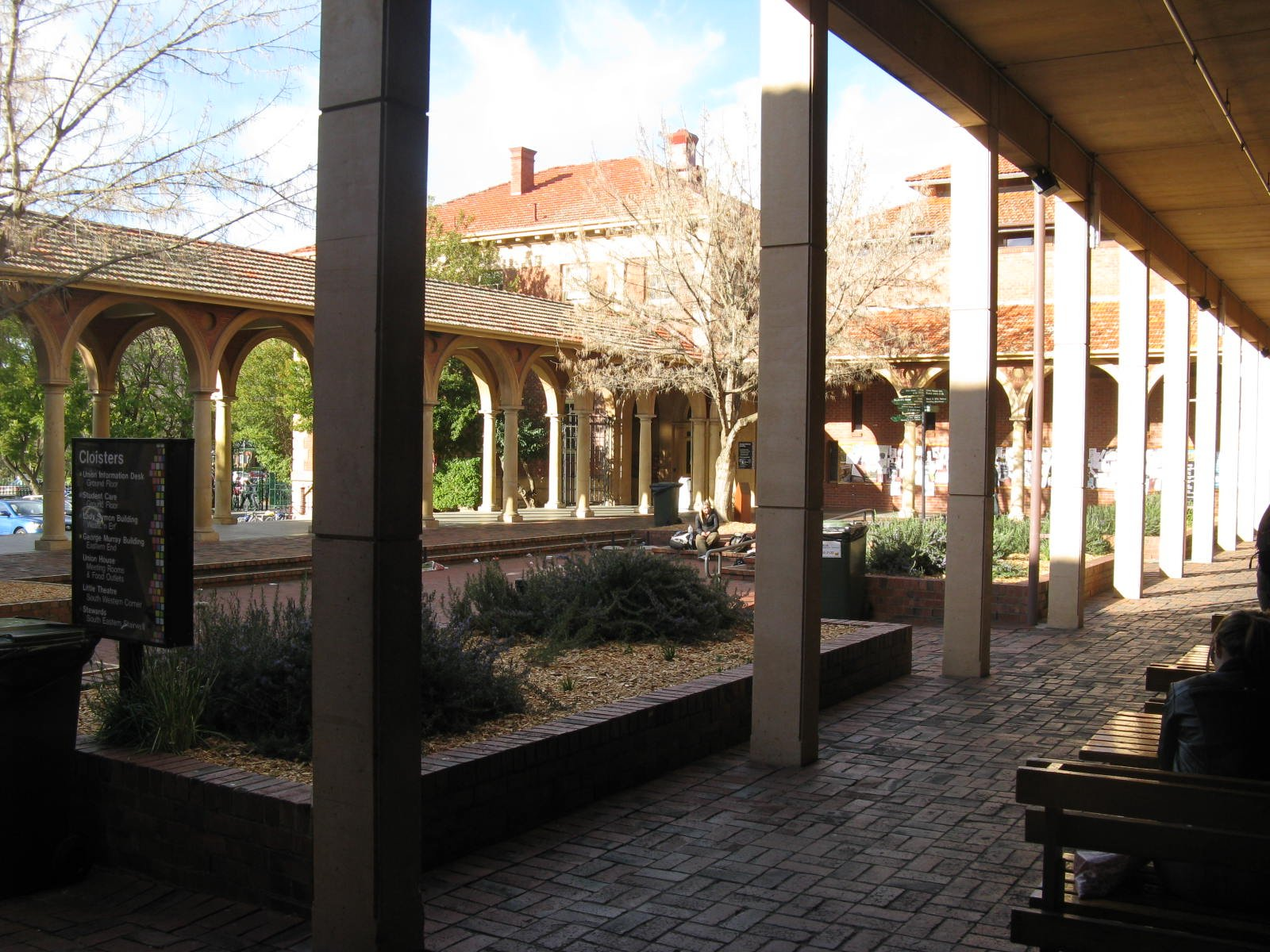
The Cloisters are a war memorial to University of Adelaide members who served and died during World War I

The Adelaide University Union redevelopment, also known as Union Buildings or Union Building Group, was completed in stages between 1967 and 1975. It created some of the most significant buildings in the complex. The redevelopment was designed by lead architect Robert Dickson and includes a heritage-listed group of buildings including the Union House, the Lady Symon Building named after the wife of Josiah Symon, the George Murray Building, the Cloisters and the Western Annexe. The earlier Georgian-style buildings were designed by the architects Woods, Bagot, Jory and Laybourne-Smith who also designed Bonython Hall, the Mitchell Gates, the Johnson Laboratories, the Barr Smith Library and the Benham Laboratories. The Adelaide University Union Cloisters were built in 1929 as a war memorial to the 470 University of Adelaide members who served during World War I, of which 64 had died during the war. There are three plaques on the site, with the latest added in 2015 to mark the centenary of the Gallipoli landing.

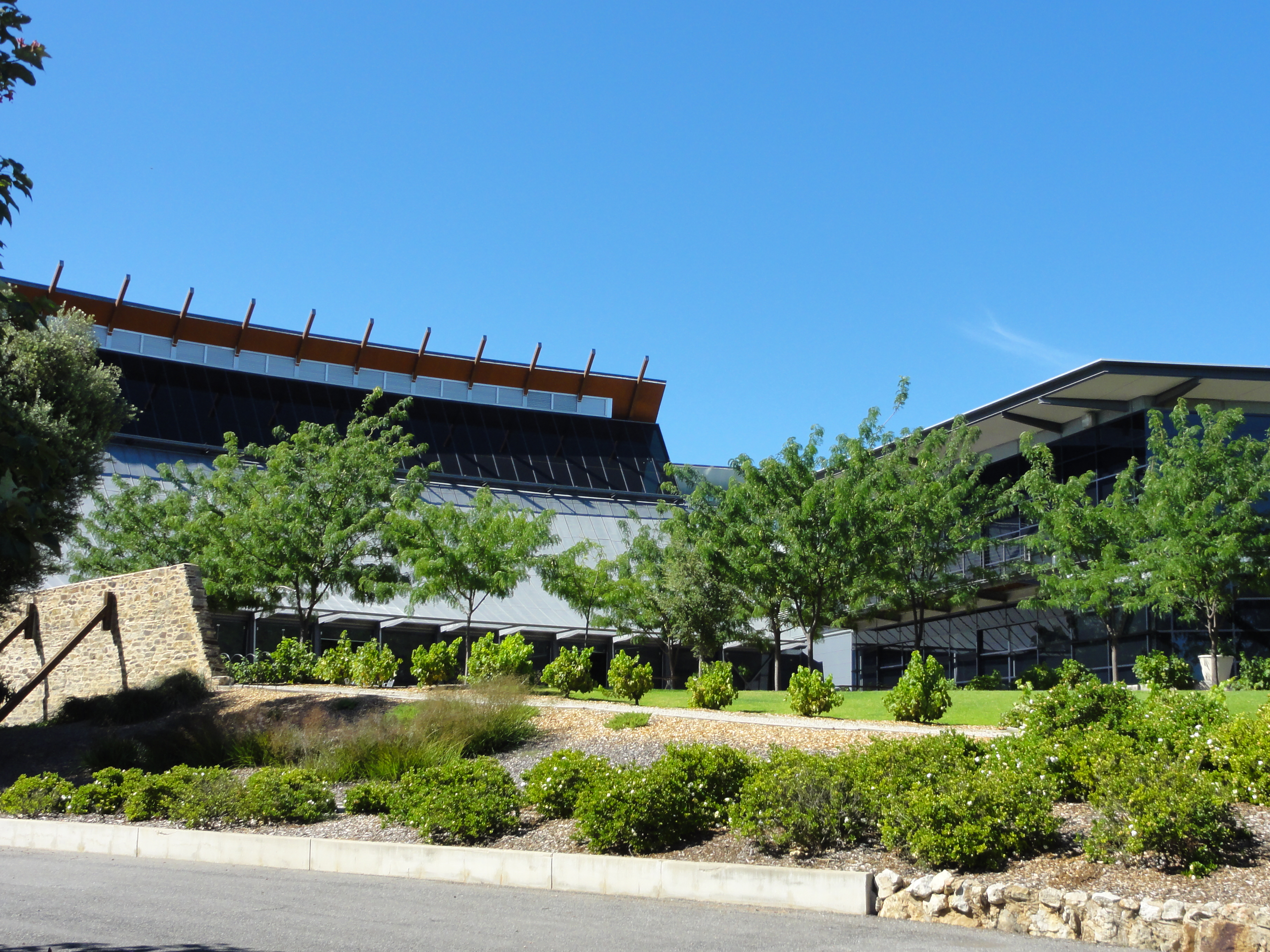
The National Wine Centre of Australia on North Terrace

The campus also incorporates part of the adjacent Lot Fourteen precinct, that is also home to the national headquarters of the Australian Space Agency among other institutions in the fields of science and technology. As part of the merger, its presence in the area will be expanded with the Australian Defence Technologies Academy, to be located in the Innovation Centre, also to be home to the Space Assembly Integration and Testing Facility (under construction as of June 2024). The National Wine Centre further along of the terrace and adjacent to the Adelaide Botanic Garden forms the easternmost extent of the city campus.

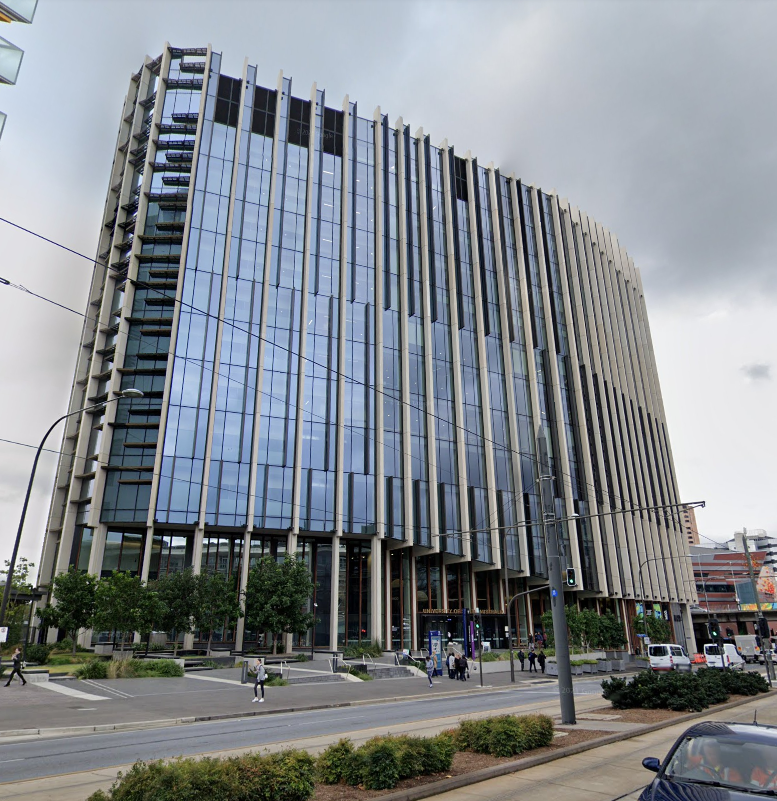
The Bradley Building, named after Denise Bradley, is part of the Adelaide BioMed City

Although both universities had a major presence in the east end, its sites on the west end are primarily occupied by the University of South Australia with the exception of the Adelaide Health and Medical Sciences Building. As the university had expanded to the west over several decades following its establishment, the buildings on the site are considerably newer than on the east. The Bradley Building and the Adelaide Health and Medical Sciences Building, which are home to various clinical and simulation facilities in the fields of healthcare and medicine, form part of the Adelaide BioMed City Precinct which also includes the affiliated Royal Adelaide Hospital and the South Australian Health and Medical Research Institute.

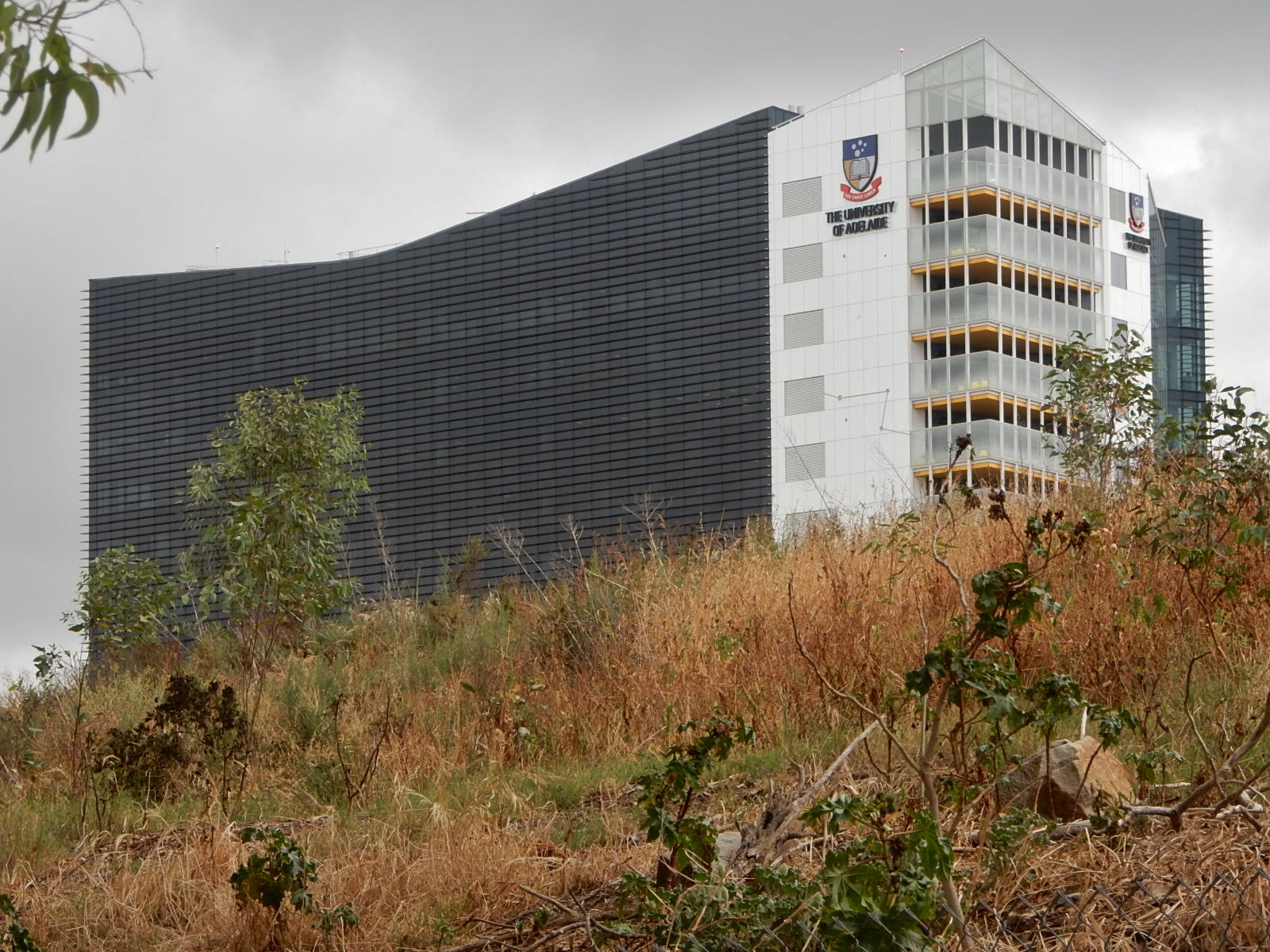
The Adelaide Health and Medical Sciences Building

The Jeffrey Smart Building, named after artist Jeffrey Smart, was constructed in 2014. It is a student hub that comprises "open plan" teaching and learning spaces, the main library on the east end and a central green common area with an outdoor cinema. The adjacent Hawke Building is named after former prime minister Bob Hawke and was constructed in 2007. It is home to the Bob Hawke Prime Ministerial Centre, Kerry Packer Civic Gallery, Samstag Museum, the Allan Scott Auditorium with a seating capacity of 400 seats and the Bradley Forum with 150 seats.

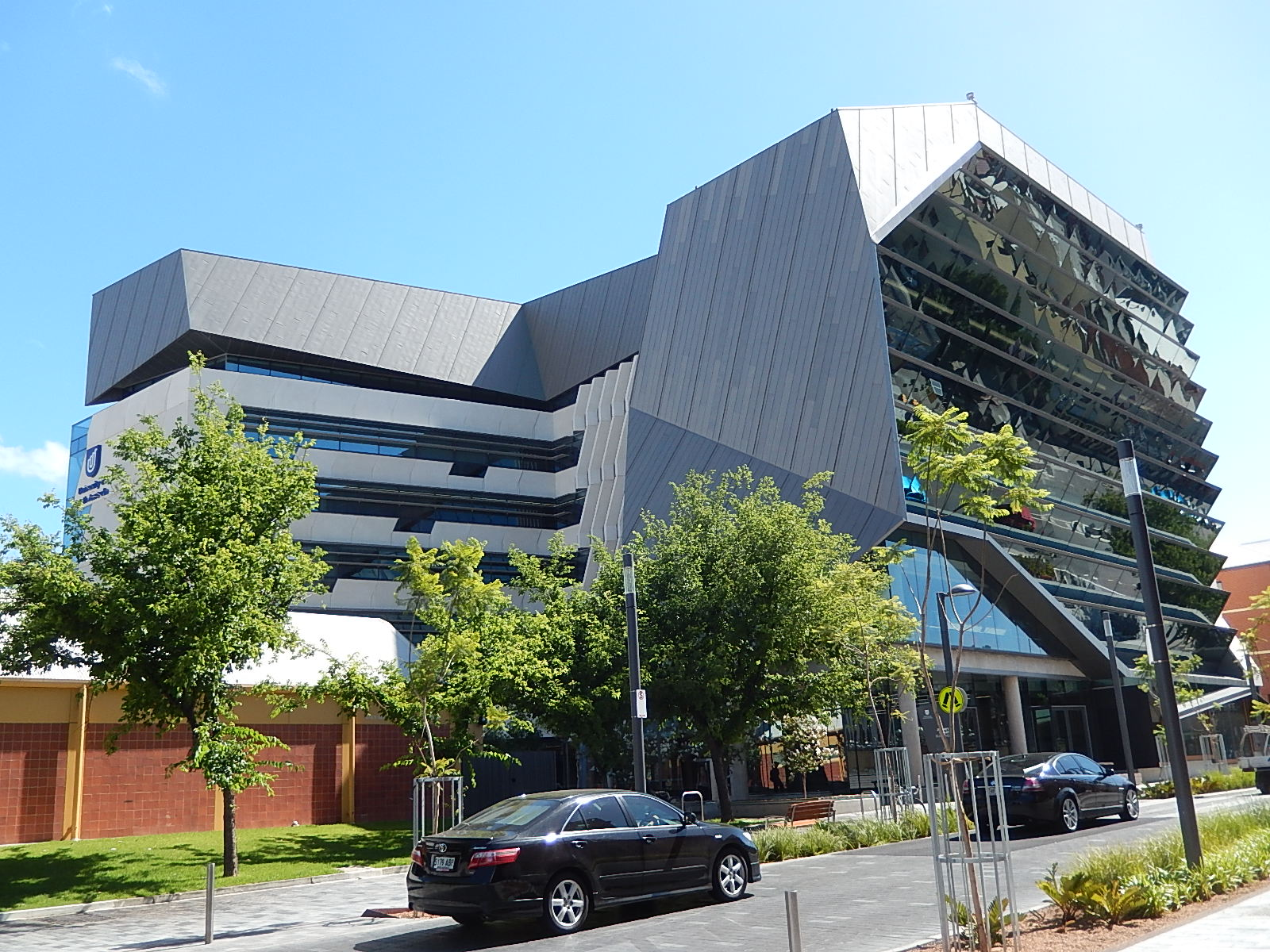
The Jeffrey Smart Building includes staff and student spaces and the east end library

Pridham Hall is a gymnasium and multi-sport facility constructed in 2018. It was designed as a collaboration between Norwegian architecture firm Snøhetta, JPE Design Studio and JamFactory. It features a 25 metres (82 ft) heated swimming pool, gymnasium, dance studio, a sloping roof amphitheatre and a 1,600 square metres (17,000 sq ft) convertible great hall that can be used for both sports or hosting events with up to 2,000 attendees. It was funded largely by alumni, including its namesake Andrew Pridham and his family who donated A$5 million toward its construction. Other buildings on the east end include the Kaurna Building, Barbara Hanrahan Building, Yungondi Building, Lewis O'Brien Building, Elton Mayo Building, David Pank Building, Catherine Helen Spence Building, Dorrit Black Building, Way Lee Building, Sir George Kingston Building, Sir Hans Heysen Building, Rowland Rees Building, Liverpool Street Studios and the Enterprise Hub.

=== Magill ===
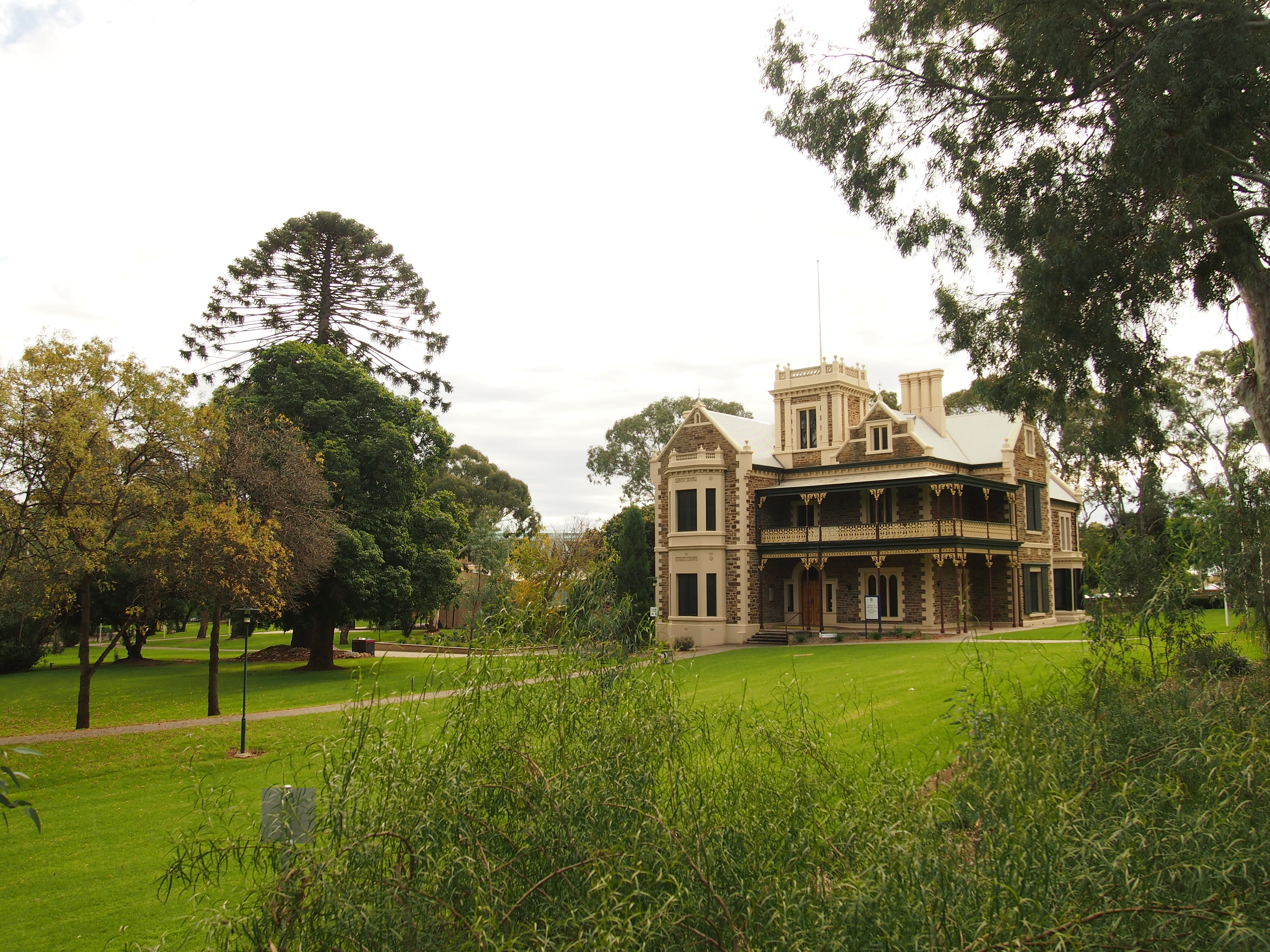
The Magill campus includes the heritage-listed Murray House and surrounding parklands

The Magill campus was established in 1973 and is located on St Bernards Road in the eastern Adelaide suburb of Magill. The campus specialises in the social sciences, psychology, neuroscience, teacher education, sports science, journalism, creative industries, human services, social work, media and communication. It also hosts several media studios, research laboratories, health clinics, a Samsung SMARTSchool and the de Lissa Institute of Early Childhood and Family Studies named after Montessori education pioneer Lillian Daphne de Lissa.

The parkland campus includes the heritage-listed Murray House, named after Scottish-born pastoralist Alexander Borthwick Murray. Built in 1884 and later expanded, the stone building incorporates Victorian-era Italianate and Gothic Revival architecture styles. According to legend, a blonde girl or young woman in Victorian-era attire named May supposedly haunts the manor, scaring patrons from the balcony or stairways. The urban myth, one of many supposed Ghosts of Murray Park, are akin to the white lady phenomenon in other parts of the world. The house replaced an earlier home built in 1854.

As part of the merger, the entirety of the University of South Australia campus has been sold for housing and commercial re-development. Approximately half of the campus is currently leased back to the university for a period of up to 10 years.

=== Mawson Lakes ===
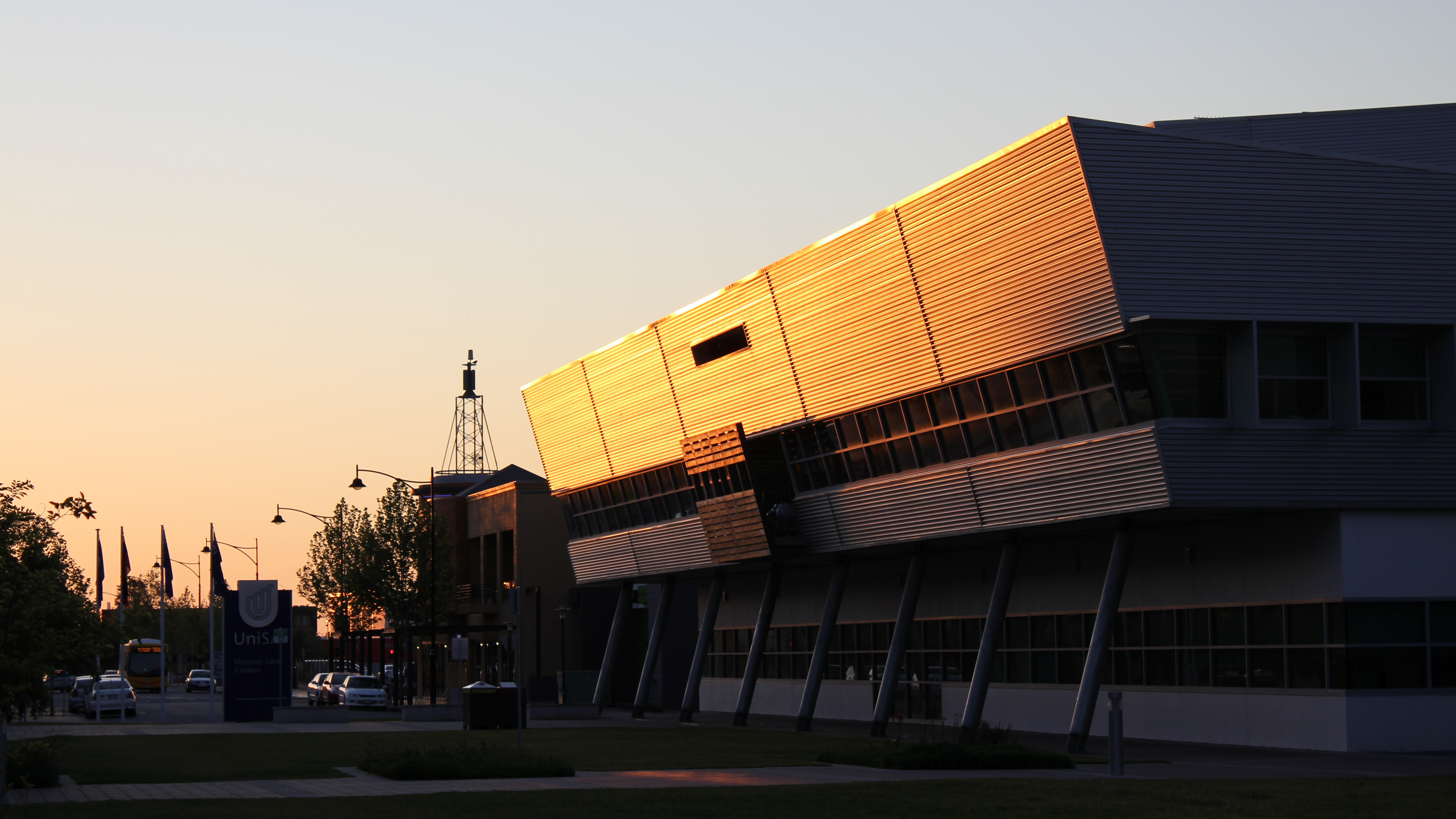
Building X on the Mawson Lakes campus adjacent to Technology Park Adelaide

The Mawson Lakes campus, established in 1972 as The Levels, is located in the northern Adelaide suburb of Mawson Lakes along 144 hectares (360 acres) of wetlands. It specialises in fields of science, engineering, computer science, environmental sciences, civil aviation and teacher education. It is also home to the Adelaide Planetarium and several information technology and engineering laboratories, including a defence research lab and the Future Industries Institute. The campus also has Airbus A320 and Boeing 737 flight and airport simulators and offers pilot training through its aviation academy at the nearby Parafield Airport.

It is also neighbours with the Adelaide Technology Park which is home to the Australian offices of Lockheed Martin, Raytheon, Northrop Grumman, General Dynamics, Saab among other multinational companies in the space and defence technology sectors.

As part of the merger, more than half of the campus has been sold for housing and commercial development. It is one of two campuses belonging to the University of South Australia where land was sold.

=== Waite ===
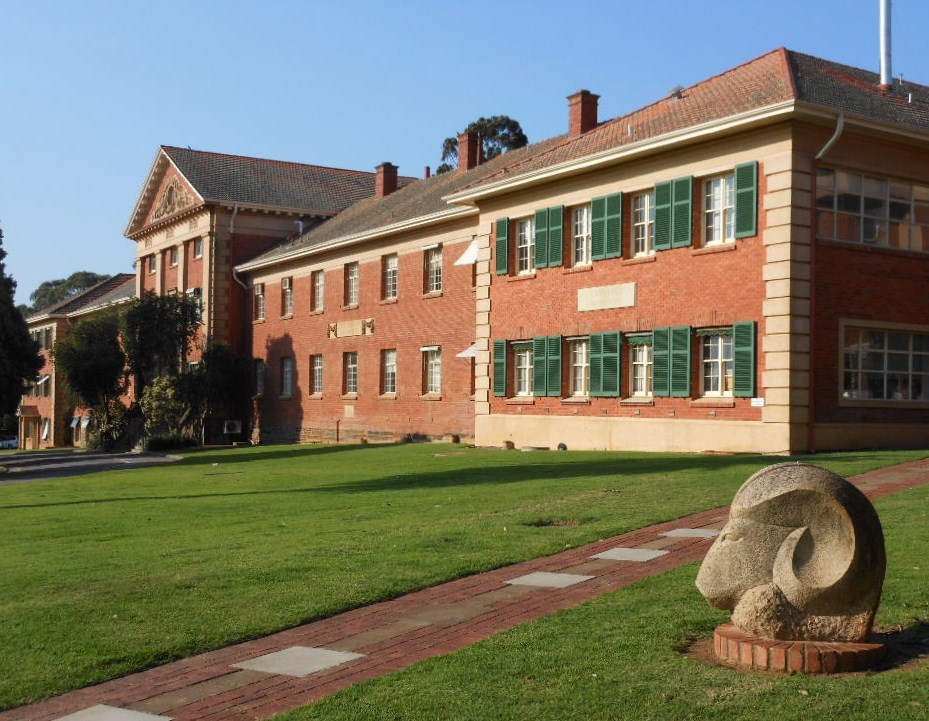
The Waite campus is home to the Waite Research Institute

The Waite campus specialises in agricultural science, viticulture, oenology, plant breeding, food research and biotechnology. It is located in the suburb of Urrbrae in Adelaide's eastern foothills, adjacent to the Urrbrae Agricultural High School, on 184 hectares (450 acres) of which a large amount was donated through the will of Scottish-born pastoralist Peter Waite. Approximately half of the land donated was dedicated for studies in agriculture and the remainder as a public park. The Waite Research Precinct is home to several research centres.

The Waite Agricultural Research Institute was established in 1924. Its first director was Arnold E. V. Richardson. Later renamed to the Waite Research Institute, it produces approximately 70% of Australia's research output in viticulture and oenology and around 80% of cereal varieties used in southern Australia were created there. A Soil Research Centre was founded in 1929 with a donation of £10,000 from Harold Darling of J. Darling and Son, grain merchants. In 2004, State Premier Mike Rann opened the A$9.2 million Plant Genomics Centre at the campus. In 2010, he opened The Plant Accelerator, a A$30 million research facility which is the largest and most advanced of its kind in the world.

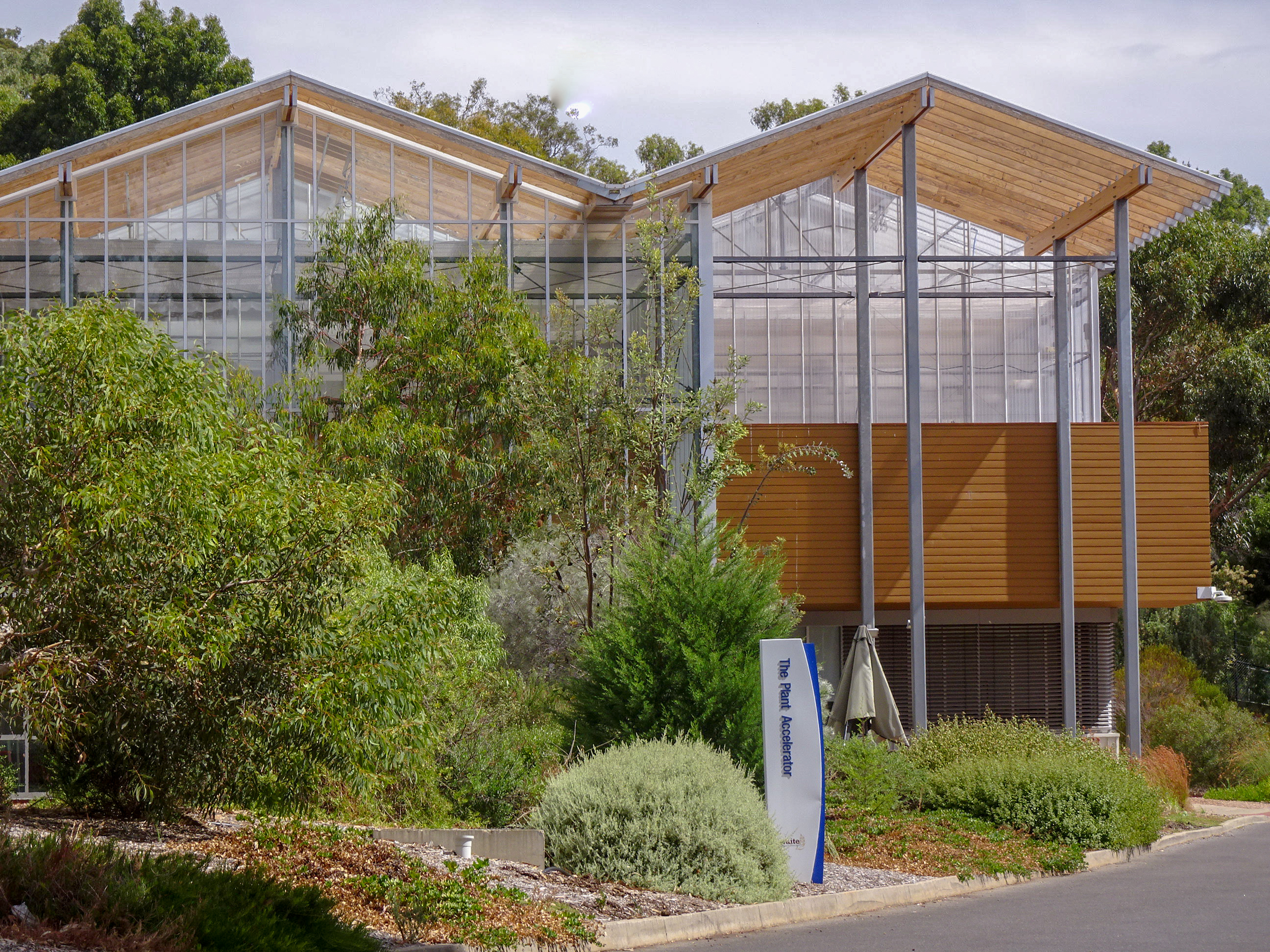
The Plant Accelerator is a plant phenotyping facility

A number of other organisations are co-located in the precinct including the South Australian Research and Development Institute (or SARDI, part of Primary Industries and Regions SA which is also headquartered at the campus), Australian Grain Technologies, Australian Wine Research Institute and the Commonwealth Scientific and Industrial Research Organisation (CSIRO).

The Urrbrae House built in 1891, now a museum, served as the home of Peter and Matilda Waite who purchased the land with support from Thomas Elder. Its interior is designed by Aldam Heaton & Co, who was also responsible for designing interiors for the Titanic. The campus is also home to the Waite Arboretum and Conservation Reserve. The Waite Arboretum is a tree museum which is home to over 2,500 tree specimens from over 1,000 taxa, many of which are endangered in the wild. The Waite Conservation Reserve, also co-located on the campus, is home to native plants and wildlife.

=== Roseworthy ===
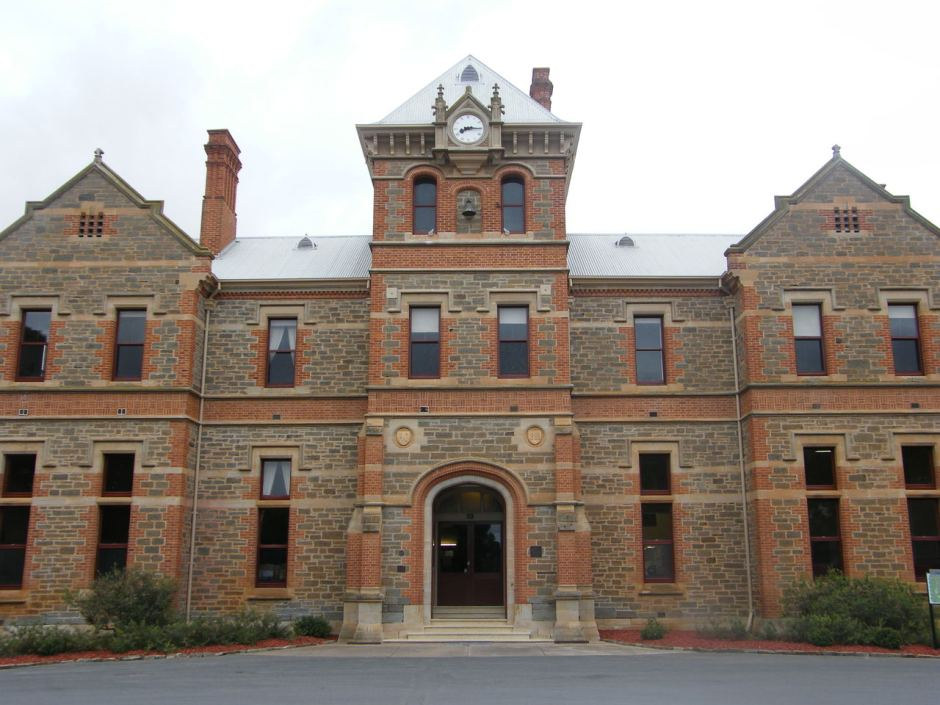
The Roseworthy College Hall, built in 1884, is a student hub

Located north of the city, the Roseworthy campus comprises 16 km^{2} (6.2 sq mi) of farmland and is a large centre for agricultural research and veterinary sciences. It was the site of the former Roseworthy Agricultural College which was established in 1883 as the first agricultural college in Australia. The Roseworthy College Hall, now the student hub, is the main building on the campus and was built in 1884. Its clock tower features a Swiss precision clock that is synced via GPS with Greenwich Mean Time. The clock tower was missing a clock for more than 120 years until 2003, when the mechanism was finally added following a donation. The colleges' teaching and research in oenology and viticulture were transferred to the Waite campus, along with the bulk of its work in plant breeding. Before studies in oenology were transferred to the Waite campus, the college had produced a number of highly regarded and awarded winemakers and wine critics.

Following the merger, the campus expanded its focus in dryland agriculture, natural resource management and animal production by the mid-1990s. The campus is also now home to South Australia's first veterinary science training program, which commenced in 2008. The Veterinary Science Centre houses teaching facilities including a surgical skills suite, a public veterinary clinic offering general practice as well as emergency and specialist veterinary services for pet animals. There are also specialised pathology laboratories at the centre for teaching, research and diagnostics. In 2013, the veterinary science facilities were expanded with the opening of the Equine Health and Performance Centre, a specialised facility for equine surgery, internal medicine, sports medicine and reproduction.

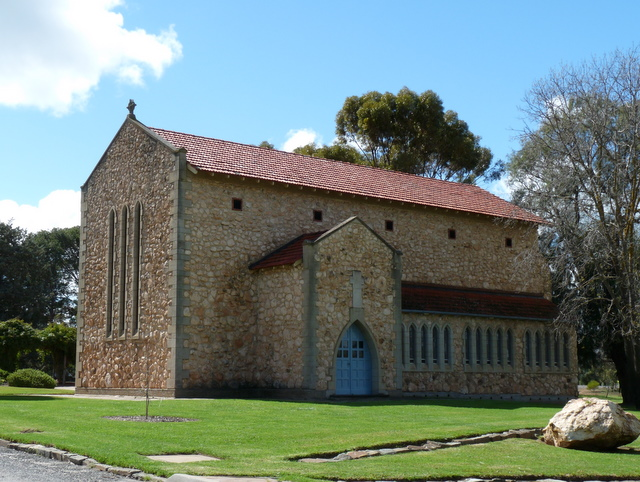
The Roseworthy Memorial Chapel was built to memorialise fallen soldiers from the college

The Memorial Chapel is a notable building on the Roseworthy campus. It was built in 1955 to memorialise students from the former college who died during World War I, World War II and the Boer Wars. The entrance features a limestone statue of a young soldier "discarding his uniform in readiness to return to the land". The organ of the chapel was donated by the mother of a student that died in New Guinea during World War II. There is a time capsule from 1976 located near the chapel. It is expected to be opened in 2026.

In 2021, the A$7 million Roseworthy Solar and Energy Storage Project was opened on the campus. It included a solar farm with an output of 1.2MW with a 420/1200kWh hybrid battery. Its 3,200 solar panels are estimated to produce 42% of the campus' energy requirements.

=== Whyalla ===
The Whyalla campus was established in 1962 and is the largest regional campus in South Australia. Located in city of Whyalla in the Eyre Peninsula, it is set on 22 hectares (54 acres) and offers studies in teacher education, nursing, midwifery, physiotherapy, occupational therapy, social work and human services.

=== Mount Gambier ===
Based in the Limestone Coast, the Mount Gambier campus was established in 2005 and offers studies in commerce, teacher education, nursing, midwifery, social work and human services. It is located in Mount Gambier, the largest regional city in South Australia. The campus also conducts research on forest management.

== Governance and structure ==
As of October 2024 the university was governed by the Adelaide University Transition Council established by the Joint Committee. It established the Transitional Academic Board, which will be responsible for academic operations.

The official opening of Adelaide University took place on 29 January 2026.

The university's governance structure includes two Deputy Chancellor roles, currently held by James (Jim) Hazel and Janet Finlay.

=== University Council ===
The main governing body of the institution will be its council. It will be the executive committee responsible for managing operations, setting policies and appointing the chancellor and vice-chancellor. The council will comprise: the chancellor, vice-chancellor, a member of the academic staff, a member of the professional staff, an undergraduate student, a postgraduate student, at least one member with a commercial background, two members with prior experience in financial management and other members appointed by the selection committee. The selection committee, which will comprise the chancellor and six other appointed members, can appoint members to the council to serve for between 2 and 4 years. This excludes elected staff and student members, which have a term limit of 2 years.

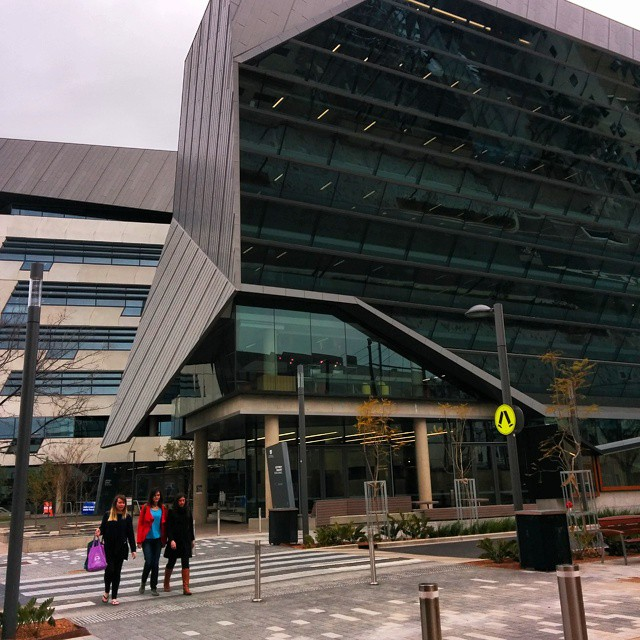
The Jeffrey Smart Building

==== Chancellor and vice-chancellor ====
The chancellor of the university is a limitless term position that is mainly ceremonial and is held by former University of South Australia chancellor Pauline Carr, who was succeeded by John Hill at the latter office in May 2024. Carr was appointed by the Transition Council. The university's internal governance is carried out by its council.

The vice-chancellor serves as the university's de facto principal administrative officer. The co-vice-chancellors during the transition were biochemists Peter Høj and David Lloyd, who were concurrently vice-chancellors of the University of Adelaide and the University of South Australia respectively. The first vice-chancellor of Adelaide University after its official opening, Nicola Phillips, commenced her term on 12 January 2026. The decision by the council to select Phillips was universal and she has had over 30 years of experience in the higher education sector in Australia and the UK, including senior leadership roles at King's College London, the University of Sheffield and the University of Manchester. Prior to her appointment, she had been provost at the University of Melbourne, where she was also a professor of political economy.

=== Finances ===
In 2023, the two antecedent universities had a combined revenue of A$1.85 billion (2022 – A$1.68 billion), a combined expenditure of A$1.83 billion (2022 – A$1.67 billion) and combined net assets of A$4.25 billion (2022 – A$4.17 billion).

=== Colleges and schools ===
The University of Adelaide had three faculties divided into 25 constituent schools and the University of South Australia was divided into seven academic units. The establishment of faculties and academic departments Adelaide University is the responsibility of its University Council.

Adelaide University is organised into six colleges, each with various discipline-based schools:

College of Business and Law
- School of Accounting and Finance
- School of Economics
- School of Law
- School of Management
- School of Marketing
College of Creative Arts, Design and Humanities
- School of Architecture and Building
- School of Communication, Media and Journalism
- School of Humanities
- School of Performing Arts and Elder Conservatorium of Music
- School of Visual Arts and Design
College of Education, Behavioural and Social Sciences
- School of Education
- School of Psychology
- School of Social Work and Social Care
- School of Society and Culture
College of Engineering and Information Technology
- School of Chemical Engineering
- School of Civil Engineering
- School of Computer Science and Information Technology
- School of Electrical and Mechanical Engineering
College of Health
- School of Allied Health and Human Performance
- School of Dentistry
- School of Medicine
- School of Nursing and Midwifery
- School of Pharmacy and Biomedical Science
- School of Public Health
College of Science
- School of Agriculture, Food and Wine
- School of Biological Sciences
- School of Mathematical Sciences
- School of Physics, Chemistry and Earth Sciences
- School of Veterinary and Animal Sciences

== Academic profile ==
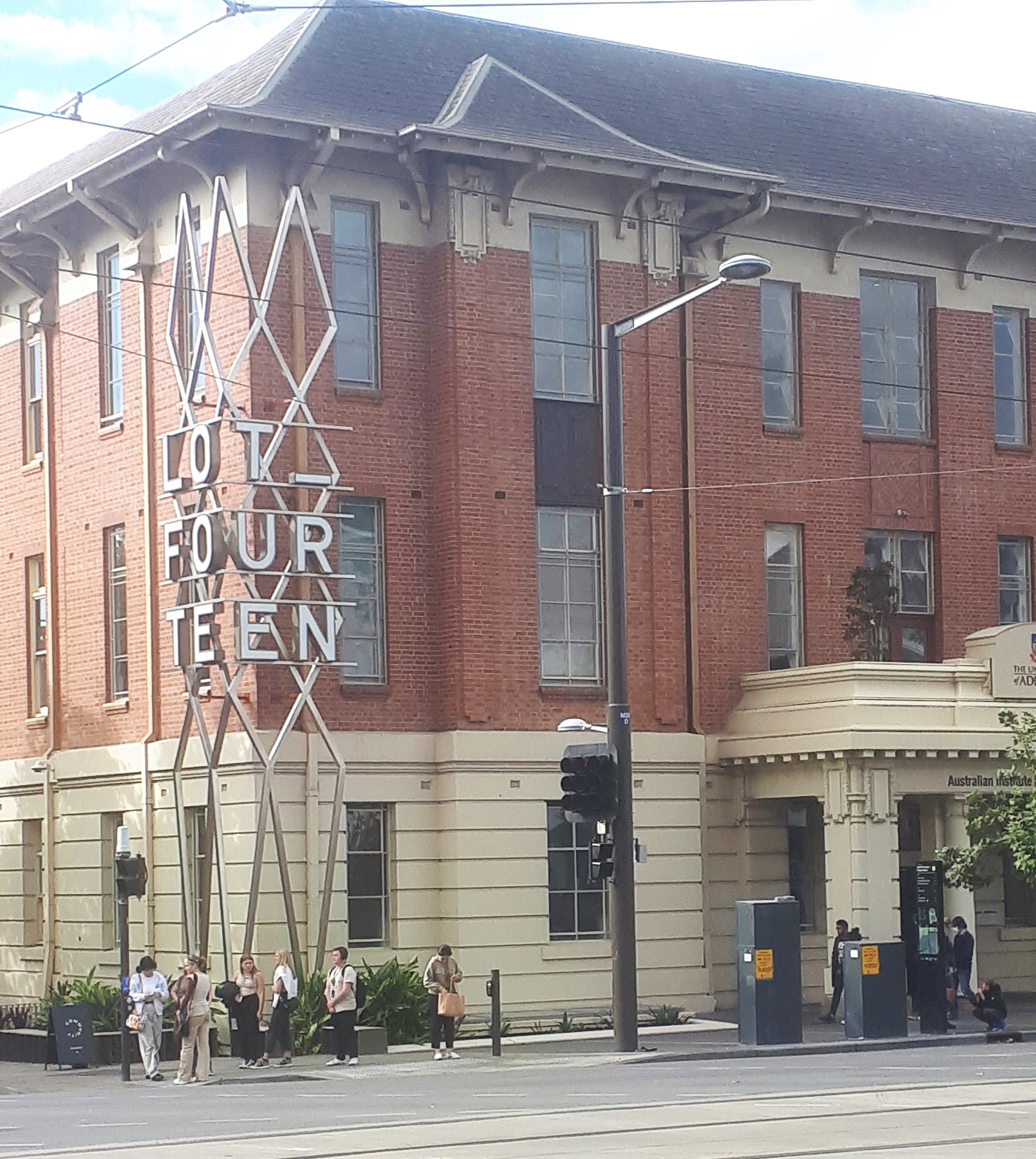
The Australian Institute for Machine Learning next to the Australian Space Agency HQ

Adelaide University has been invited to become a member of the Group of Eight, a coalition of research-led Australian universities. The university is expected to continue its presence in the Adelaide BioMed City research precinct and remain in Lot Fourteen next to the Australian Space Agency headquarters. As part of the merger, the Australian Defence Technologies Academy will also be opened in Lot Fourteen in the under-construction Innovation Centre, also to be home to the Space Assembly Integration and Testing Facility. In 2024, BAE Systems announced that it will establish its Australian headquarters at the centre.

The Mawson Lakes campus will also be adjacent to the Adelaide Technology Park which is home to the Australian offices of Lockheed Martin, Raytheon, Northrop Grumman, General Dynamics, Saab among other multinational companies in the space and defence technology sectors.

The antecedent universities also offers some degree programs in Brisbane, Singapore and Hong Kong as part of a joint ventures with local institutions.

University rankings

Global – Overall
- QS World: =79 (2027)
- THE World: 133 (2026)

National – Overall
- QS National: 8 (2026)
- THE National: 7 (2026)

=== Academic reputation ===
In the 2026 Quacquarelli Symonds World University Rankings (published 2025), the university attained a tied position of #82 (8th nationally).

In the Times Higher Education World University Rankings 2026 (published 2025), the university attained a position of #133 (7th nationally).

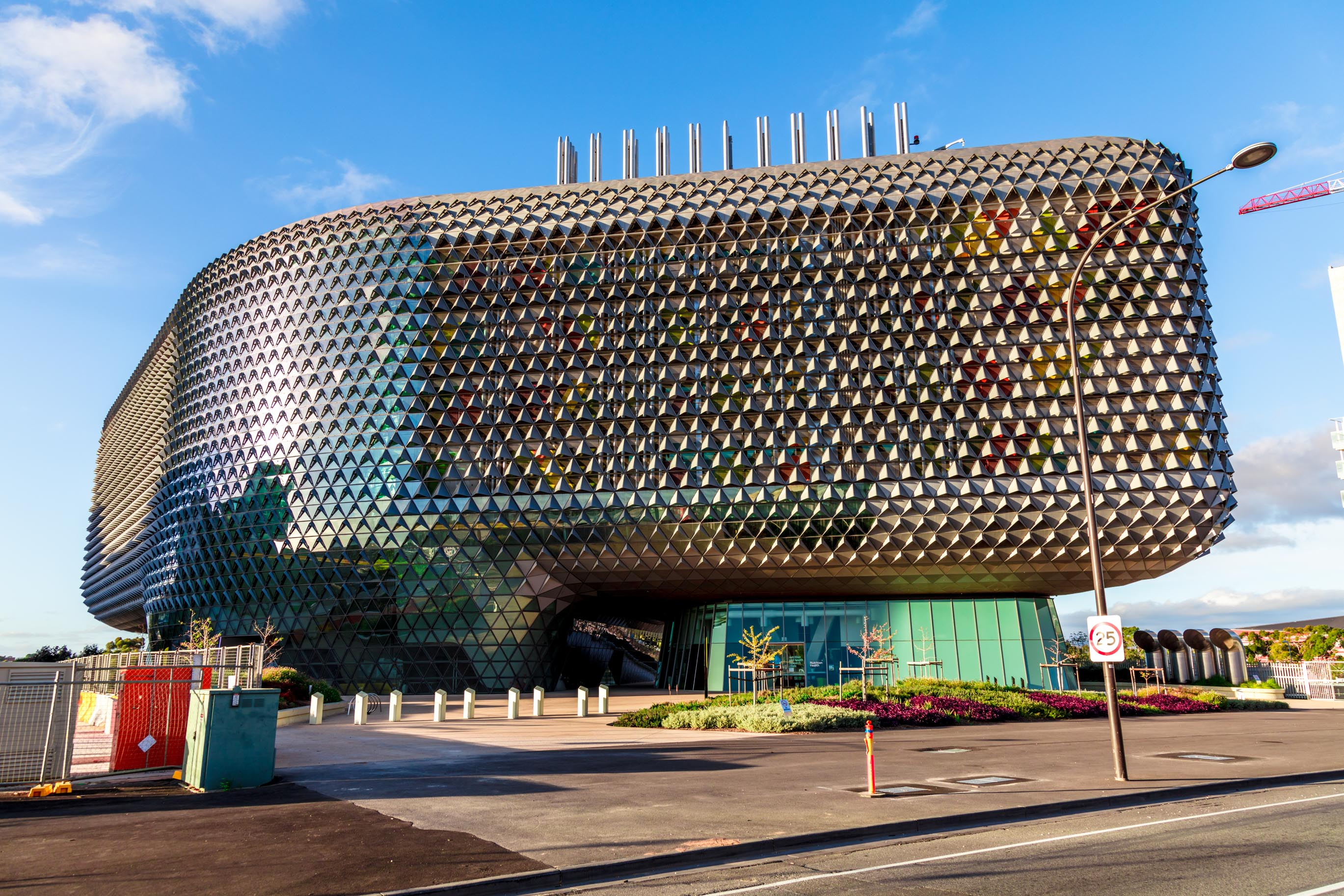
South Australian Health and Medical Research Institute

=== Research and publications ===
In the 2018 ERA National Report, the Australian Research Council evaluated work produced between 2014 and 2018. 100 per cent of research activity at both antecedent universities were judged to be "at or above world standard" (3–5*).

== Libraries and archives ==
There are currently nine libraries located across the seven campuses. Siân Woolcock was appointed as the inaugural University Librarian for Adelaide University in December 2025.

=== Barr Smith Library ===
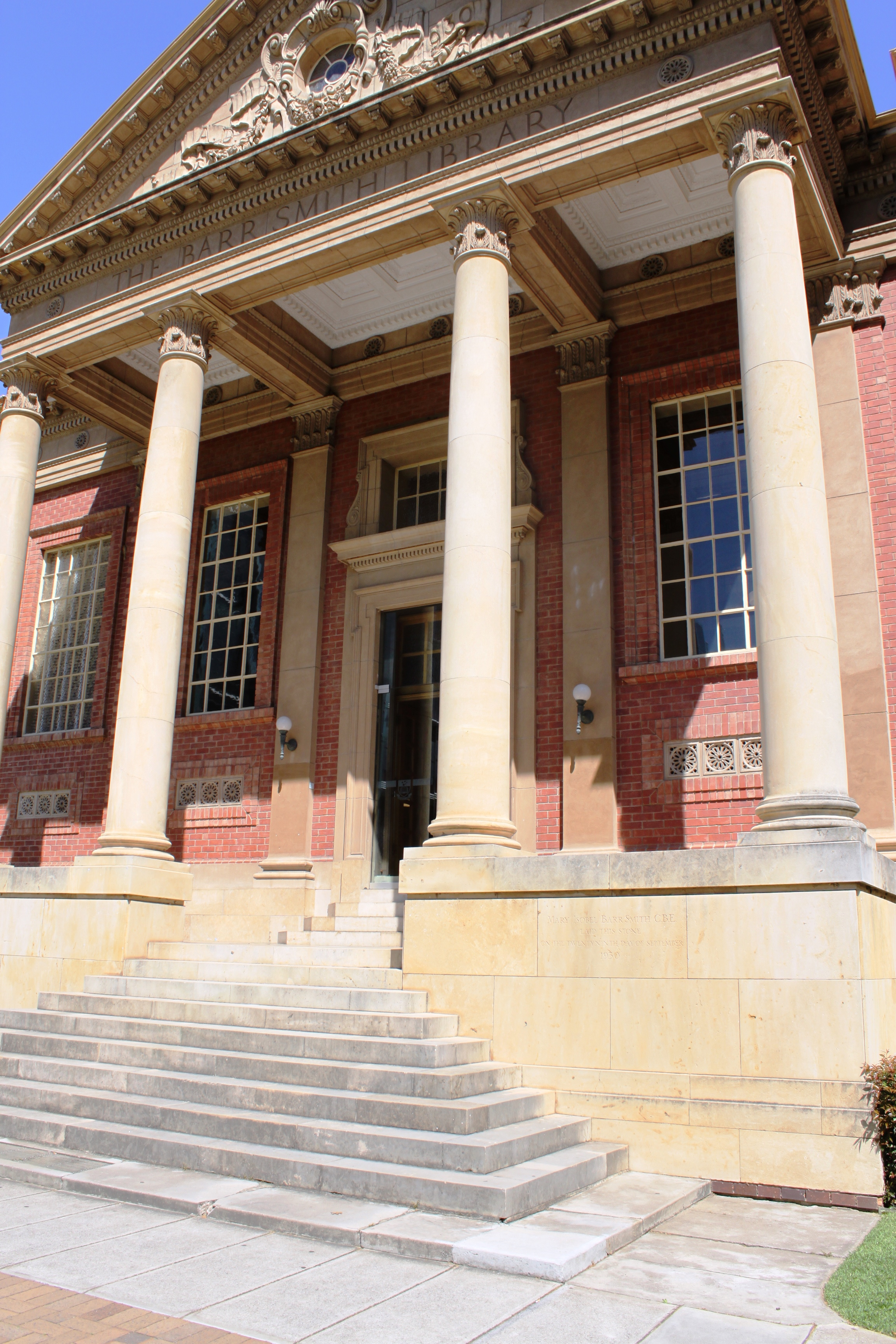
Corinthian pillars incorporated into the Barr Smith Library

The Barr Smith Library is the third-oldest university library in Australia and was originally located in the Mitchell Building.

The library purchased its first book in 1877 for £11, prior to its formal establishment in 1882. It was later named after its founder Robert Barr Smith who throughout his life had donated £9,000 to purchase books towards the struggling library, which previously had no librarian and an annual budget of £200 of which £150 were spent on books. William Barlow, the registrar, acted as the de facto first librarian of the then-small library and R. J. M. Clucas was the first official librarian in 1900. Following Robert's death in 1915, an additional endowment of £11,000 in 1920 was made by his family. In 1928, his son Tony Elder Barr Smith donated almost £35,000 towards a new building for the library to reduce congestion at its original site. Robert's granddaughter Christine Margaret Mcgregor also donated almost 5,000 books in 1974. The building was designed in the Georgian Revival architecture style by Walter Hervey Bagot of the Adelaide-based architecture firm Woods, Bagot & Laybourne Smith and was inspired by Kensington Palace in London. Following its completion, its collection was transferred from the Mitchell Building through a zip line. The building features red-brick exteriors with an entrance with Corinthian pillars below an inscription reading "The Barr Smith Library". It was later expanded twice to increase capacity, reaching a peak of 2.4 million books in 2014.

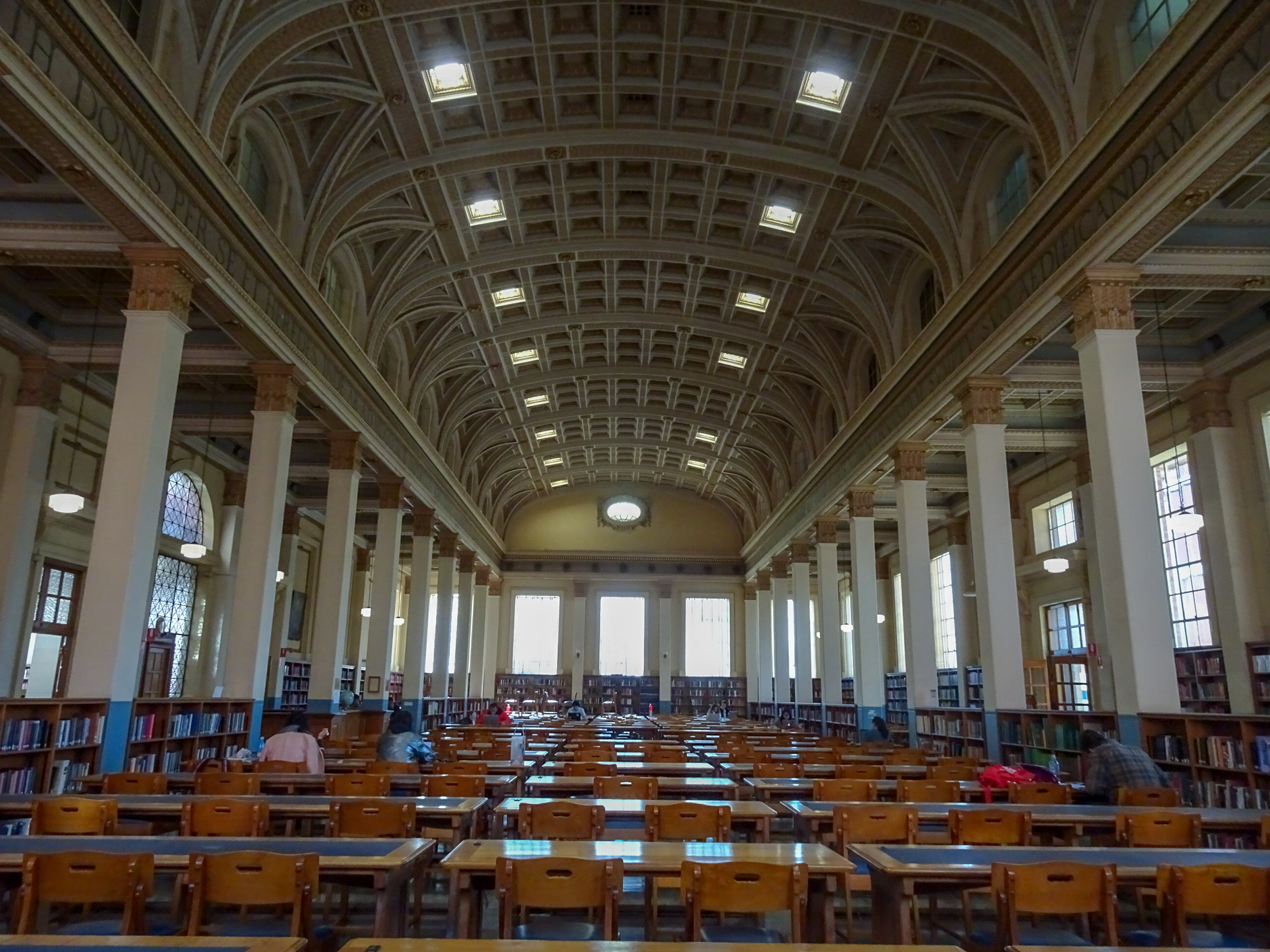
The Reading Room in the library features gilded ivory arches and tall pillars.

The Barr Smith Reading Room is a notable feature of the library on Level 2. It features oak flooring and furniture with white pillars holding the gilded and ivory arches that form the rounded ceiling. Between the pillars and the arches are two large Latin inscriptions that run across both sides of the room in gold and commemorate the donations from Robert and his family who played a major role in its development. In mid-2023, over 61 paper planes were found in ledges around the ceiling of the reading room, including one made using a university brochure dating back to 1991.

The library is also home to a collection of rare books, the archives documenting the development of the both universities among other collections across various subject areas. This includes books belonging to Samuel Way's collection, who had donated 16,000 books.

=== Brookman Library ===
Established in 1903, the library is located in the Brookman Building. Whilst the library was part of the University of South Australia, it was named after Scottish-born merchant and politician David Murray who donated £2000 towards the library.

=== Sir John Salmond Law Library ===
Established in 1883, the Sir John Salmond Law Library holds a collection of legal works from Australian and overseas sources including the United Kingdom, Canada, New Zealand and the United States. In 1967, the law library moved to the Ligertwood Building, which was among those that replaced the demolished Jubilee Exhibition Building. It was renamed two years later after John William Salmond who was the third professor of law at the Adelaide Law School.

=== Jeffrey Smart Library ===
The Jeffrey Smart Library, named after artist Jeffrey Smart, is a library on the east end of North Terrace. It comprises "open plan" teaching and learning spaces and a central green common area.

=== Bob Hawke Prime Ministerial Library ===
The Bob Hawke Prime Ministerial is the prime ministerial library of Bob Hawke who served between 1983 and 1991. Established in 1997, it was the first of its kind in the world to be founded during the lifetime of a prime minister. The Bob Hawke Collection forms the bulk of its archives and includes a large collection of his notes, personal papers, state gifts, biographical texts, newspaper extracts, photographs, political comics, articles, recordings and transcripts of speeches and media events, including documents from ministers from his cabinet. Notable artefacts held at the library include a hide belt gifted by former president Ronald Reagan, the jacket he wore to the 1983 America's Cup celebrations, a replica of a Panther Model 100 motorcycle that he crashed as a university student and several prime ministerial briefcases. The library, which was expanded following his death in 2019, is located in the Hawke Centre.

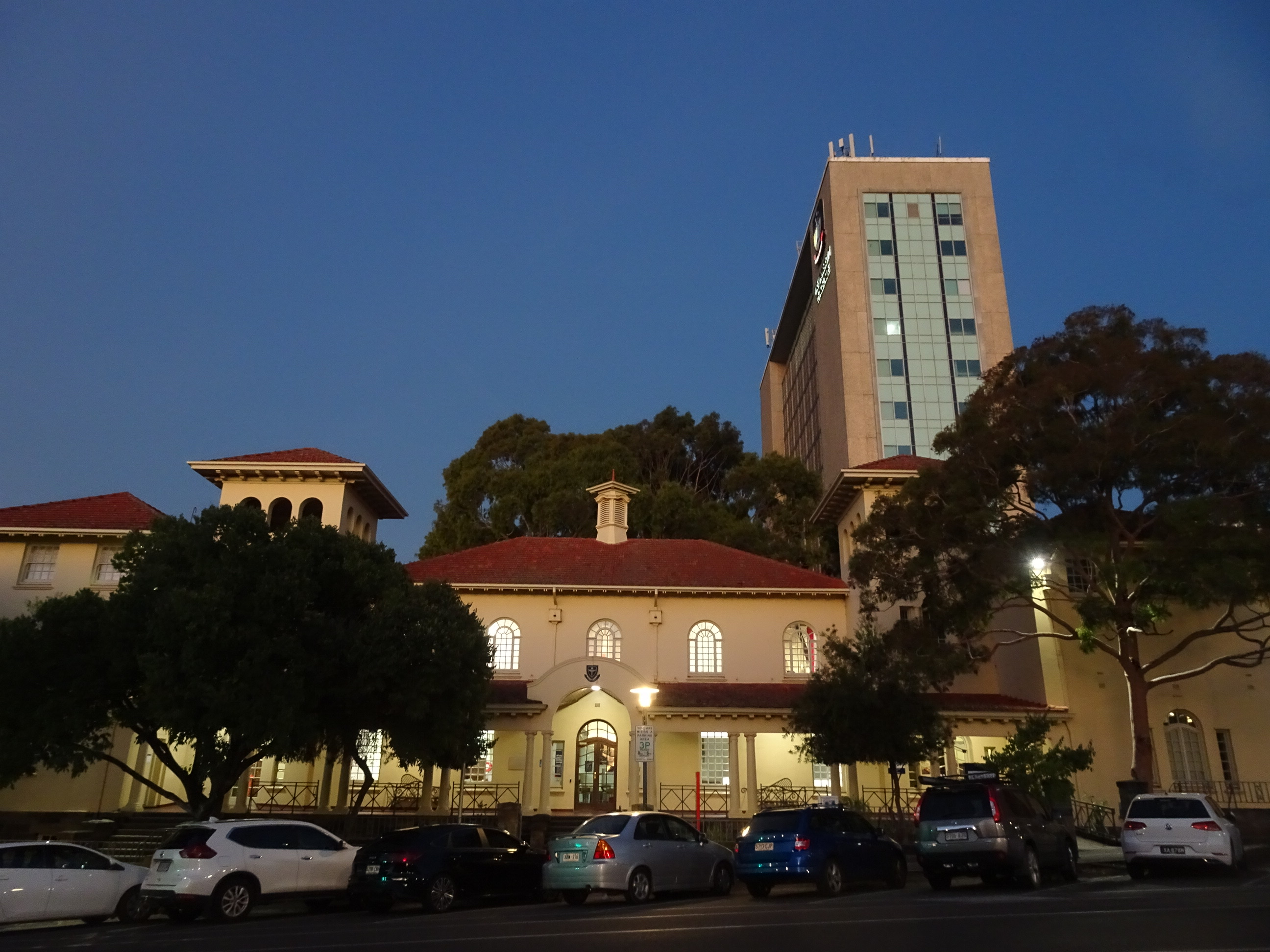
The Hartley Building is the planned home of the Julia Gillard Prime Ministerial Library

=== Julia Gillard Prime Ministerial Library ===
The Julia Gillard Prime Ministerial Library is the planned prime ministerial library of Julia Gillard who served between 2010 and 2013. It is a collaborative effort with the National Archives of Australia and will include documents from her career and prime ministerialship. It is expected to open in 2027 and will be located in the Hartley Building, which will also play host to the annual Julia Gillard Public Lecture, research and other programs.

=== Roseworthy Library ===
The Roseworthy Campus Library, formerly the Roseworthy Agricultural College Library, is located on the Roseworthy campus.

It dates back to the former Tassie Memorial Library which was funded by John Tassie in 1920. It was built as a memorial to his son, also named John Tassie, who was a student at the then Roseworthy College who died during World War I in France. It was later expanded in 1945 through donations by A Lowrie, the widow of former principal William Lowrie. The William Lowrie Memorial Annexe, which connected to the previous library in a T-shape, was completed in 1947. The library moved to its current site in 1974 due to increasing size constraints with the former site now used as a gymnasium.

=== Waite Woolhouse Library ===
The Waite Campus Library, also known as the Woolhouse Library, is located on the Waite campus in Urrbrae.

=== Other libraries ===
The Mawson Lakes and Magill campuses also have their own libraries.

== Museums and galleries ==
The university inherited several museums, galleries and other exhibition spaces from its antecedent institutions. These include:

=== MOD. ===
MOD. (Museum of Discovery) is described as "a futuristic museum of discovery" featuring exhibitions designed by researchers to showcase "how research shapes our understanding of the world around us to inform our futures". It is located in the Bradley Building.

=== Samstag Museum of Art ===
The Samstag Museum of Art is a contemporary art gallery located at the Hawke Building. Established in 2007, its history dates back to 1977 as the College Gallery. It is named after Anne and Gordon Samstag and is located at the Hawke Building.

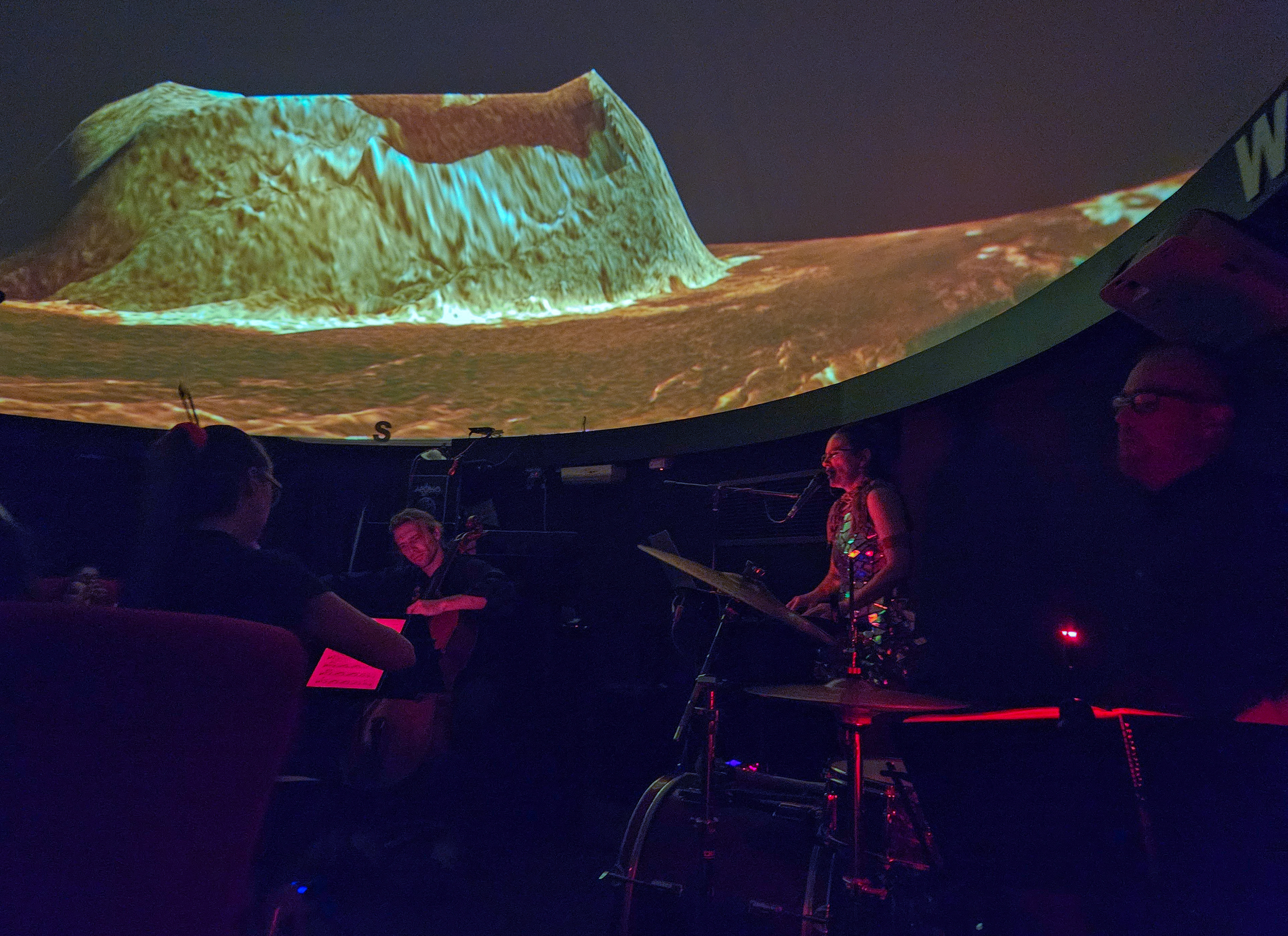
The K Mak at the Planetarium exhibition at the Adelaide Planetarium in 2024

=== Adelaide Planetarium ===
Constructed in 1972, the Adelaide Planetarium is a planetarium at the Mawson Lakes campus. It hosts public exhibitions and short courses that are open to the public.

=== Architecture Museum ===
The Architecture Museum includes a collection of 400,000 items including drawings, photographs, correspondence, photographs and personal papers mostly donated by architects who worked in the state during the 20th century. It is also a library comprising books, journal articles, research and other literature. It was formally established in 2005, though the collection has been available to the public since the 1990s. Its early collection was donated by Donald Leslie Johnson, an architecture historian and curator, who began collecting the works in the 1970s due to a lack of a repository in the state. The museum, which also conducts research in the field of architecture and the built environment, is located in the Kaurna Building.

=== Tate Museum ===
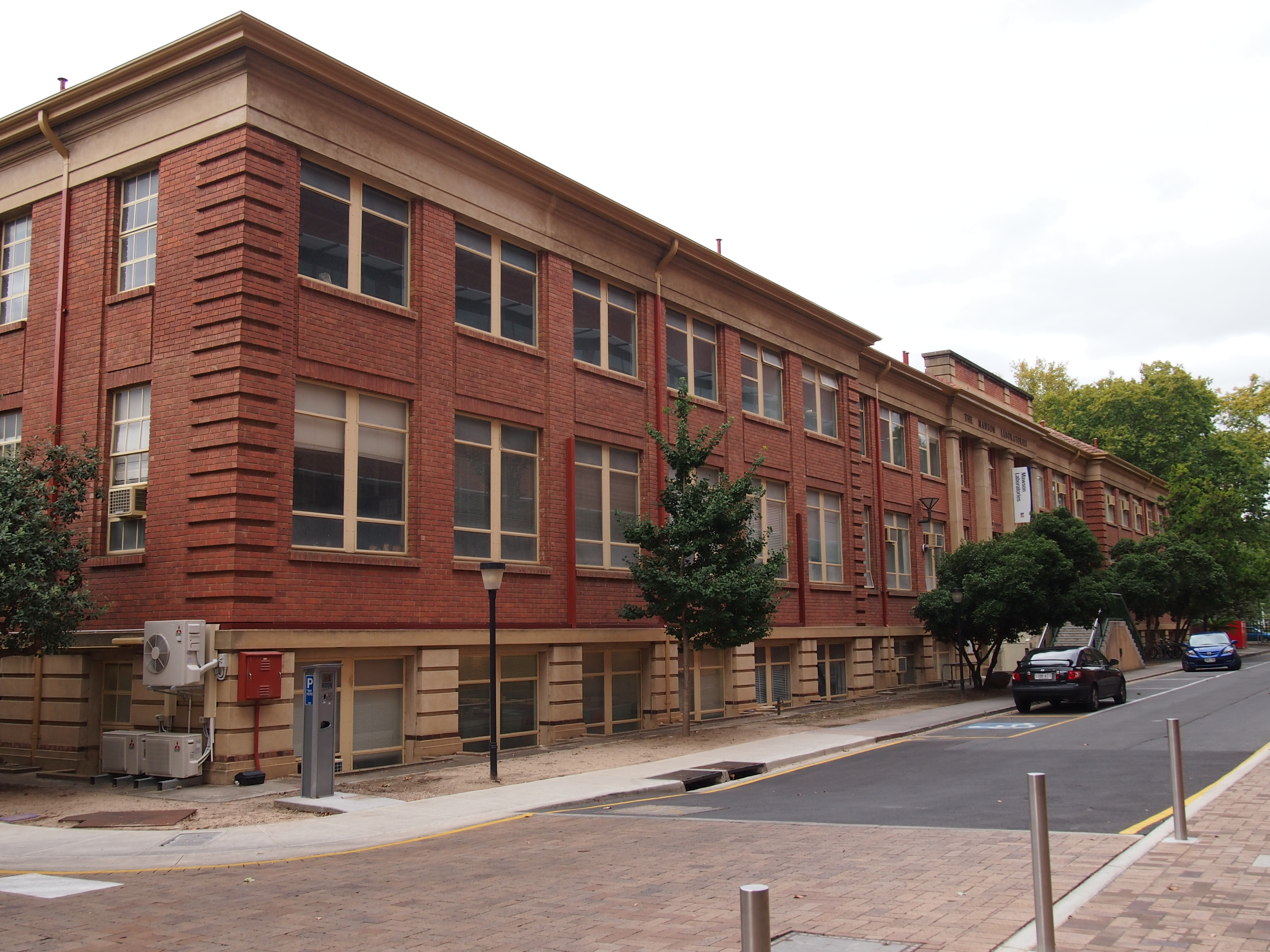
The Tate Museum is located at the Mawson Laboratories

The Tate Museum is one of the largest geological museums in Australia with a collection of approximately 29,000 rocks and fossils including meteorites, tektites, asteroids and specimens of early life. It was established in 1902 following the death of its namesake botanist and geologist Ralph Tate, though the museum existed informally since 1881 when he first began the collection. In 1952, it moved from the former Prince of Wales Building to the Mawson Laboratories named after geologist and explorer Douglas Mawson. The museum also hosts artefacts from Mawson's various expeditions to the Antarctic, including one of his original sleighs. Its first official curator is Tony Milnes who had worked to restore and document the large collection. Notable specimens include some of earth's earliest organisms, a number of which are from up to 550 million years ago, and segments of an asteroid that smashed into the state's Gawler Ranges around 580 million years ago.

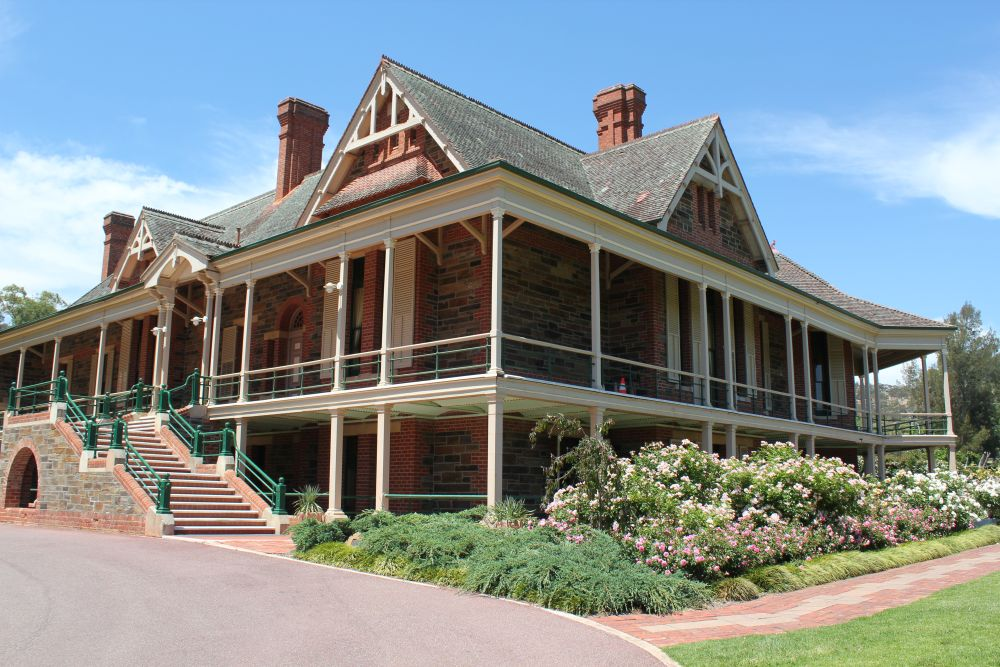
The Urrbrae House, built in 1891, is now a museum

=== Waite Historic Precinct ===
The Waite Historic Precinct includes the Urrbrae House museum, Waite Arboretum and Waite Conservation Reserve. The museum resides in the former home of Peter Waite and was built in 1891. Its interior is designed by Aldam Heaton & Co, who was also responsible for designing interiors for the Titanic. The Waite Arboretum, a tree museum, is home to over 2,500 tree specimens from over 1,000 taxa, many of which are endangered in the wild. The annual rainfall at the arboretum is 622mm. The Waite Conservation Reserve is home to native plants and fauna.

=== Other exhibition spaces ===
The SASA Gallery showcases creative works by students and researchers. It is located in the Kaurna Building on the City East campus. It is the modern descendant of the SA School of Art (SASA) established in 1856.

The Bob Hawke Prime Ministerial Centre and Kerry Packer Civic Gallery have exhibitions that change regularly.

The Ira Raymond Exhibition Room in the Barr Smith Library is a contemporary dynamic space featuring diverse exhibitions, including student and faculty partnered exhibitions, that showcase university collections.

== Other divisions ==
Other planned divisions of the university include:

=== Elder Conservatorium ===
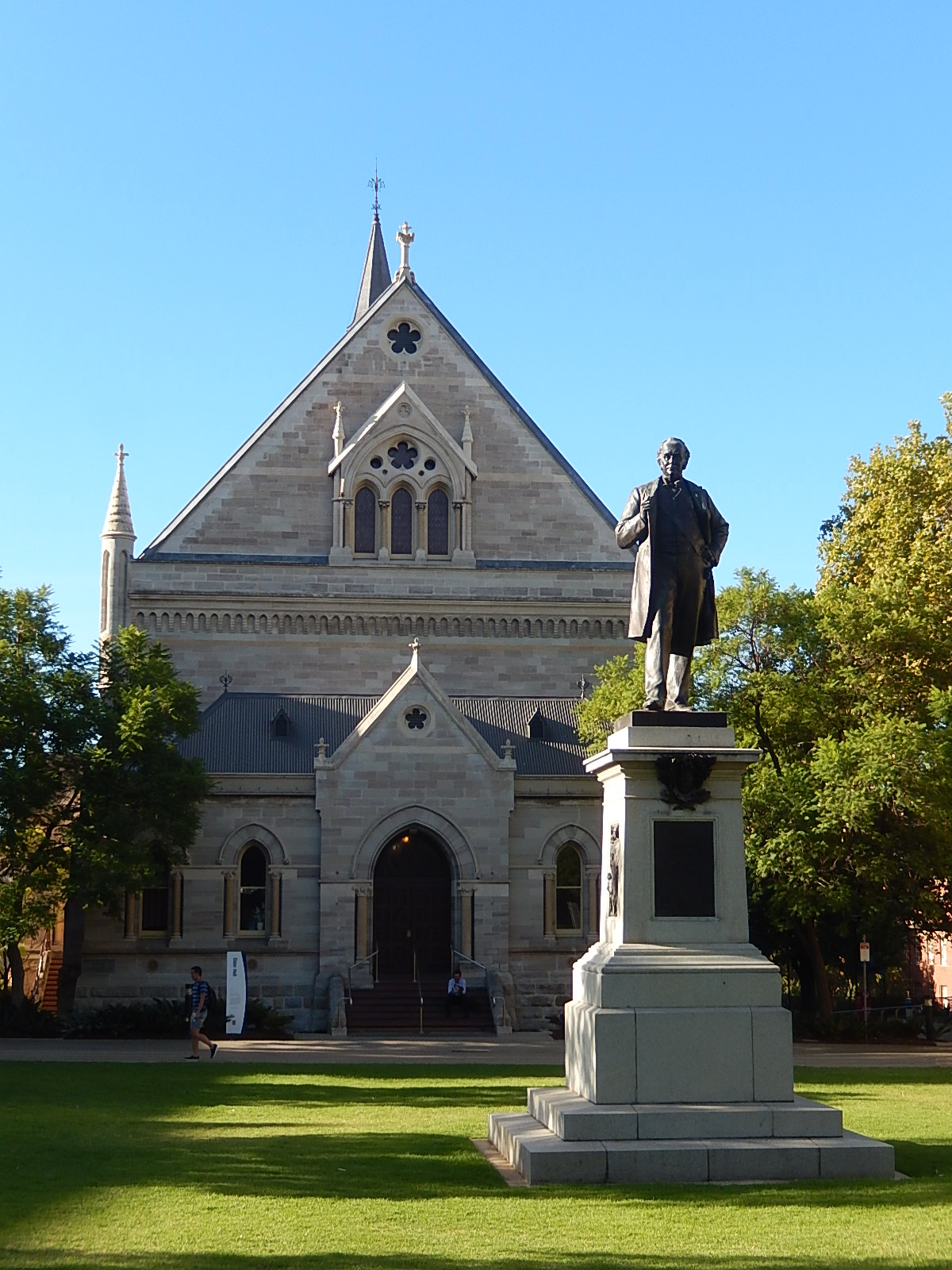
Elder Hall, named after early donor Thomas Elder, integrates freestone from Mount Gambier

Established in 1883, the Elder Conservatorium of Music and School of Performing Arts is the oldest tertiary music academy in Australia. The academy's first professor of music was Cambridge graduate Joshua Ives, also the first professor of music in Australia. Edward Harold Davies was the first Australian to graduate with a Doctor of Music in 1902 and Ruby Claudia Davy was the first Australian woman to earn the doctorate.

The conservatorium occupies the Schulz Building, which had been part of the city campus of the South Australian College of Advanced Education before the 1991 merger. The building was designed by state government architects and opened in 1964. It was named after Adolf John Schulz, third principal of the college.

It offers study and research programs in jazz, classical performance, musical theatre, classical voice, pop music, sonic arts, music production, song-writing, music composition, conducting, teaching, ensembles, and performance studies. It is also home to the Australian String Quartet, Sia Furler Institute and the Centre for Aboriginal Studies in Music. The conservatorium also offers theatre performances and Lunchtime and After Hours concert series.

=== Elder Hall ===
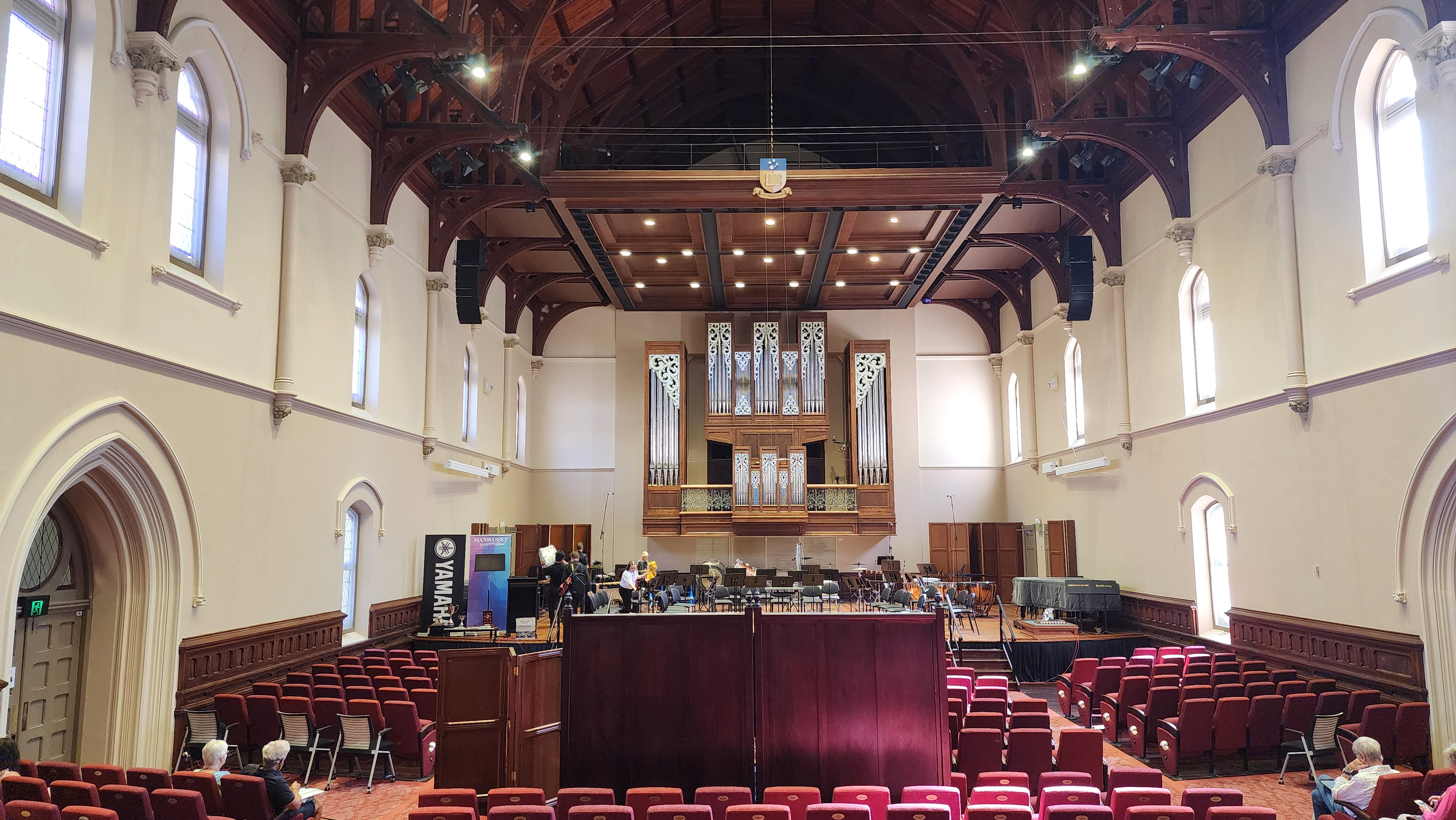
The Elder Hall was inspired by Florentine Gothic architecture

Elder Hall is a large concert hall that was built following the death of its namesake and music lover Thomas Elder, who left £20,000 towards its construction. The great hall was constructed in the Florentine Gothic architectural style integrating freestone from Mount Gambier. The founding stone, made from nearby gumtree, was placed on 26 September 1898 by state governor Thomas Fowell Buxton. The building was officially opened exactly two years later on 26 September 1900 in a formal ceremony despite having been already used for months. The South Australian Register reported the next day that the great hall was opened by Lord Tennyson "positively for the last time" and that "the majority of those who were present had already attended at two more or less appropriate ceremonial openings of the Elder Hall".

The original pipe organ was built by Josiah Eustace Dodd of Twin Street, Adelaide. It was enlarged in 1934. With the upgrading of Elder Hall in 1978, a new organ was acquired, as the Dodd organ was in need of restoration. Its current organ was built by Casavant Frères of Quebec in 1979, designed in the French Classical tradition. The Dodd organ was later was purchased by St Mark's Cathedral in Port Pirie.

From 1999 Elder Hall was used for the Adelaide Festival of Ideas. It was again completely refurbished in 2006.

Today it is used by the Elder Conservatorium as well as for a number of public events.

=== National Wine Centre ===
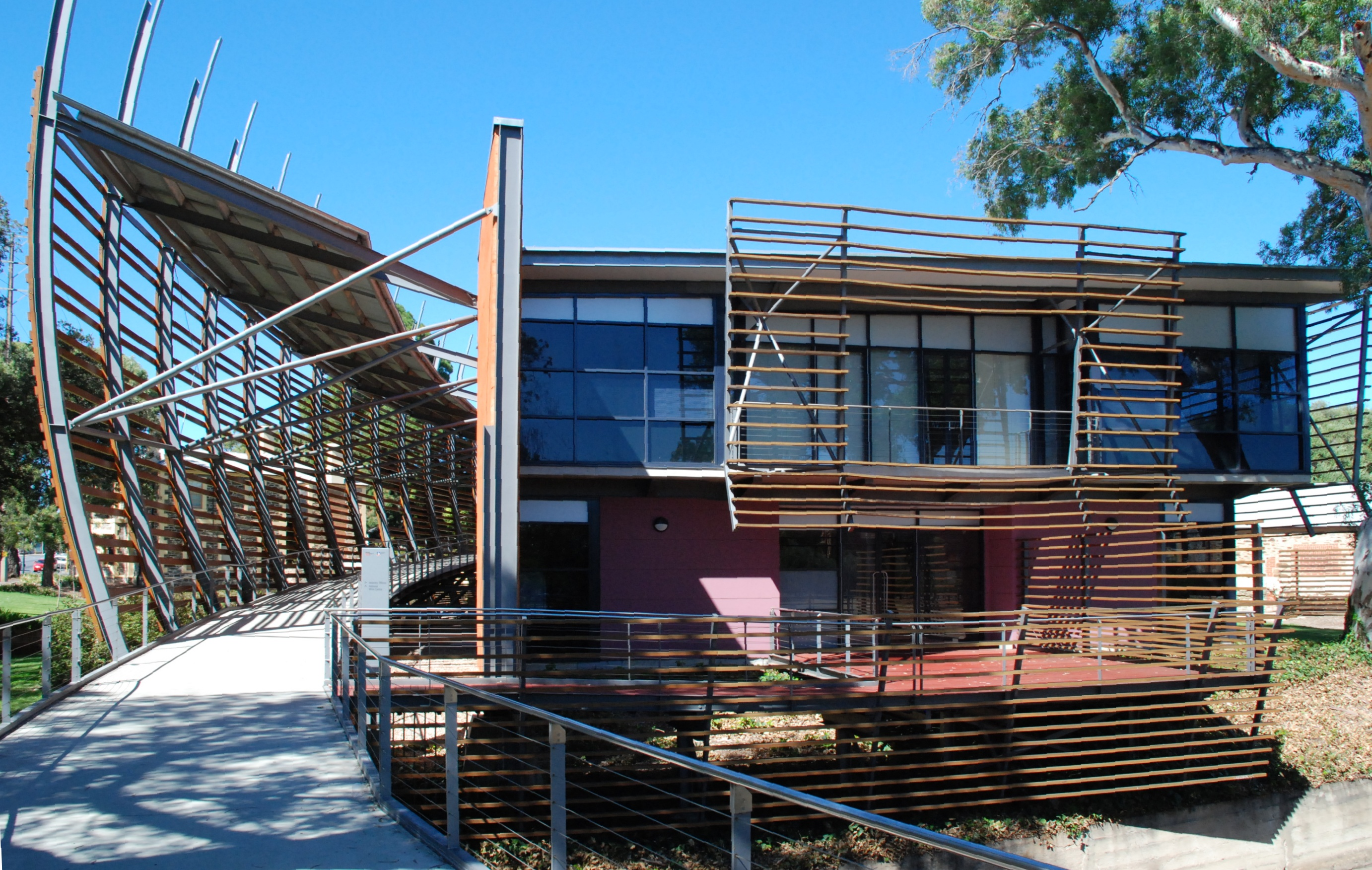
The National Wine Centre of Australia on North Terrace

Located in the Adelaide Park Lands at the eastern end of North Terrace, the National Wine Centre offers some of the university's oenology courses. Opened in 2001, the facility also hosts public exhibitions about winemaking and its industry in South Australia. It contains an interactive permanent exhibition of winemaking, introducing visitors to the technology, varieties and styles of wine. It also has wine tasting areas, giving visitors the opportunity to taste and compare wines from across Australia. The building, which is adjacent to the Adelaide Botanic Gardens, was designed by Phillip Cox and Grieve Gillett and uses building materials to reflect items used in making wine.

== Student life ==
=== Adelaide University Student Association ===
The Adelaide University Student Association (AUSA) is the university's student union.

==== Former student associations/unions ====
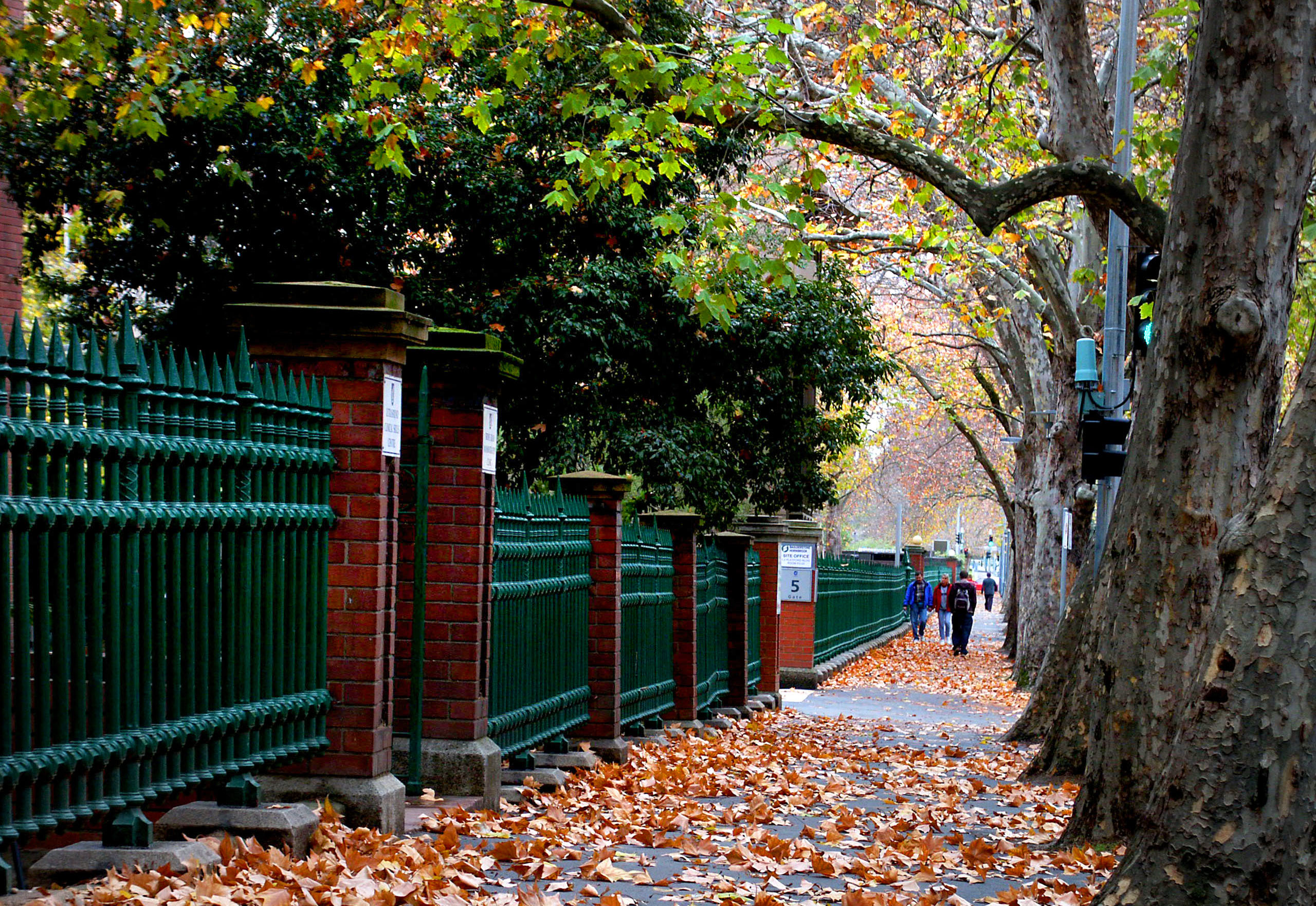
A footpath along the east end sites on War Memorial Drive

The antecedent universities' two student unions, YouX and USASA, are expected to merge into one. YouX, which was founded in 1895, is one of the oldest students' unions in Australia. It was established by the founding clubs of its then-affiliated Adelaide University Sports Association, which was itself established the following year. USASA was founded in 1994.

=== Student magazines ===
The two student unions produce their own student magazines. YouX produces the On Dit magazine, pronounced on-dee after the French expression "we say", which was established in 1932 as the second-oldest student-run print media in Australia. Former writers of the newspaper include several federal politicians including former prime minister Julia Gillard. USASA produces the Verse Magazine which was established in 2014 and has an annual print run of 12,000 copies. The two magazine publish artwork and written pieces including campus news, creative writing, essays, exposés, opinion pieces, photography, poetry, reviews and visual art.

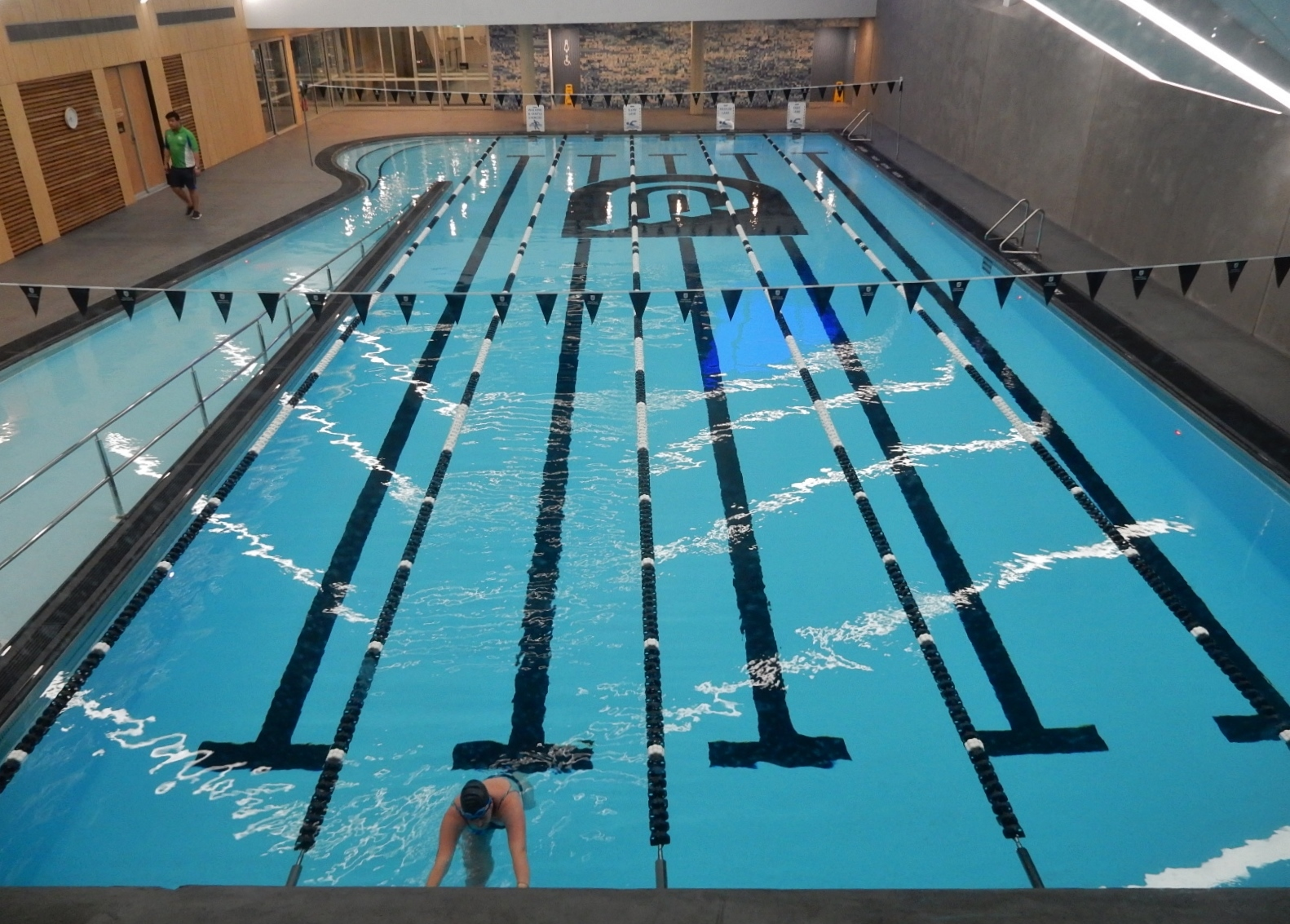
Pridham Hall is a gymnasium and multi-sport facility

=== Sports and athletics ===
The two foundational universities supported sports associations with long histories of sporting excellence including competing at the UniSport Nationals and the state-level SA Challenge intervarsity competitions.

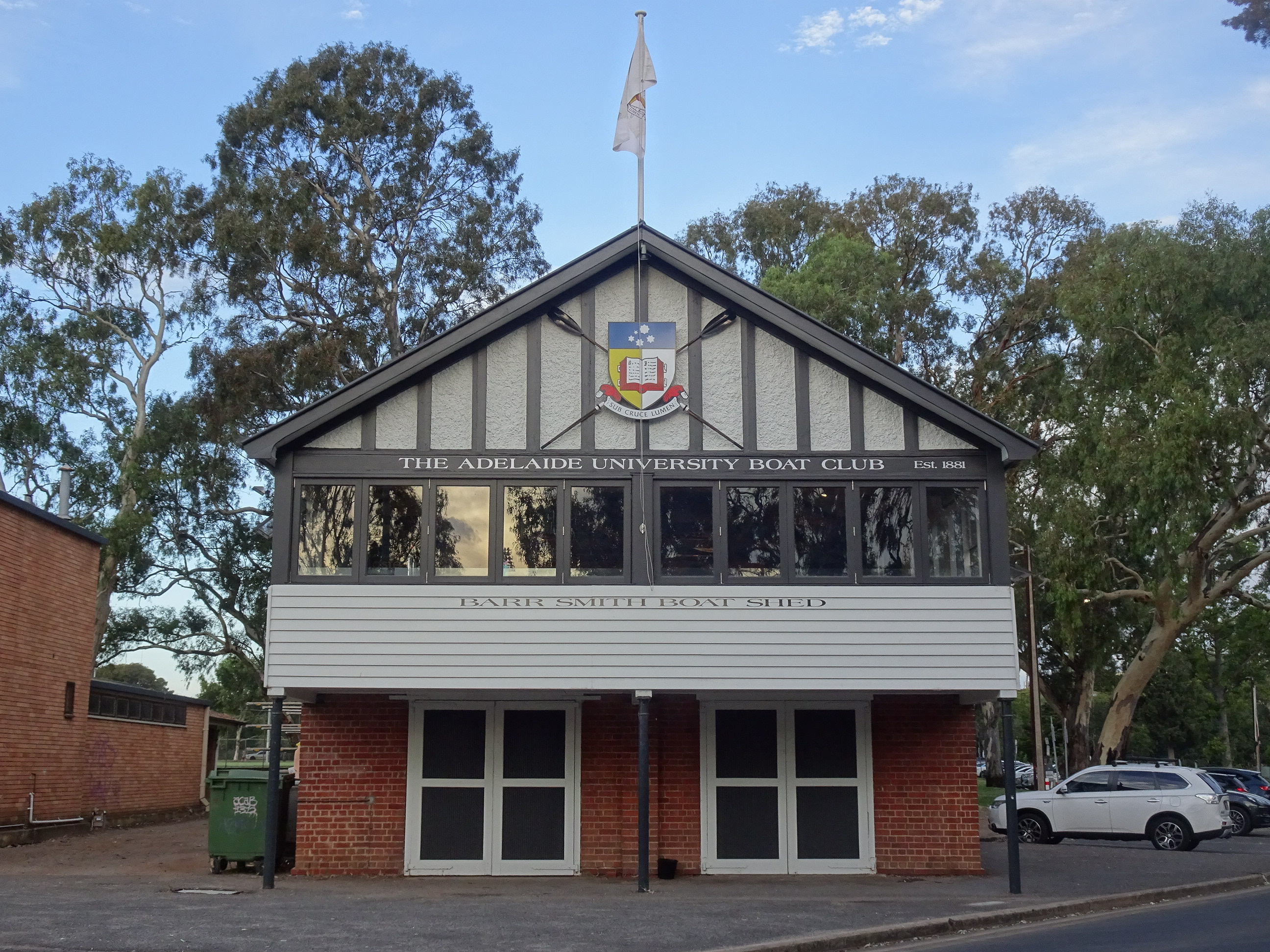
The Barr Smith Boat Shed donated by Robert Barr Smith

==== University of Adelaide ====
Established in 1896, Adelaide University Sport has 37 sports clubs, including its three founding clubs that predate its establishment. Its historical motto is Mobilitate Vigemus translated "we thrive by mobility". Its sporting colours black and white are likely from the white-backed magpie, an Australian bird found on its crest and the state badge. Its mascot is Gus, a black lion, which replaced the piping shrike on its historical crest.

==== University of South Australia ====
Founded in 2013, UniSA Sport has 28 sports clubs and competes as Team UniSA. It includes several clubs that predate the university. This includes its hockey club which was affiliated with the antecedent South Australian Institute of Technology since 1970.

=== Residential colleges ===
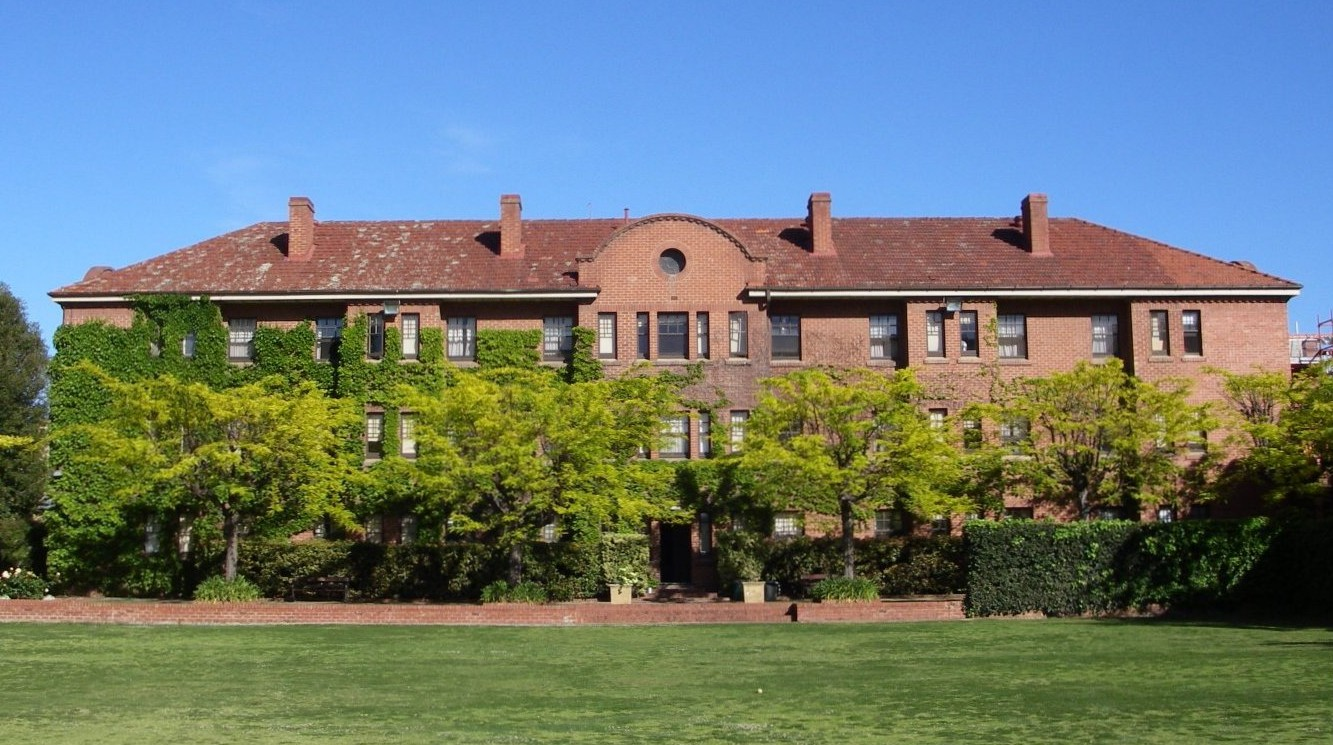
Newland Building of St Mark's College, one of several private residential colleges

St. Mark's College was founded in 1925 by the Anglican Diocese of Adelaide and is the oldest of the colleges. It was developed by some former residents of the Universities of Oxford and Cambridge among others with the goal of developing a similar collegiate lifestyle.

Aquinas College was founded as a men's college in 1950 by the Catholic Church at Montefiore House, the former residence of Samuel Way. It later expanded to surrounding sites and became co-residential in 1975.

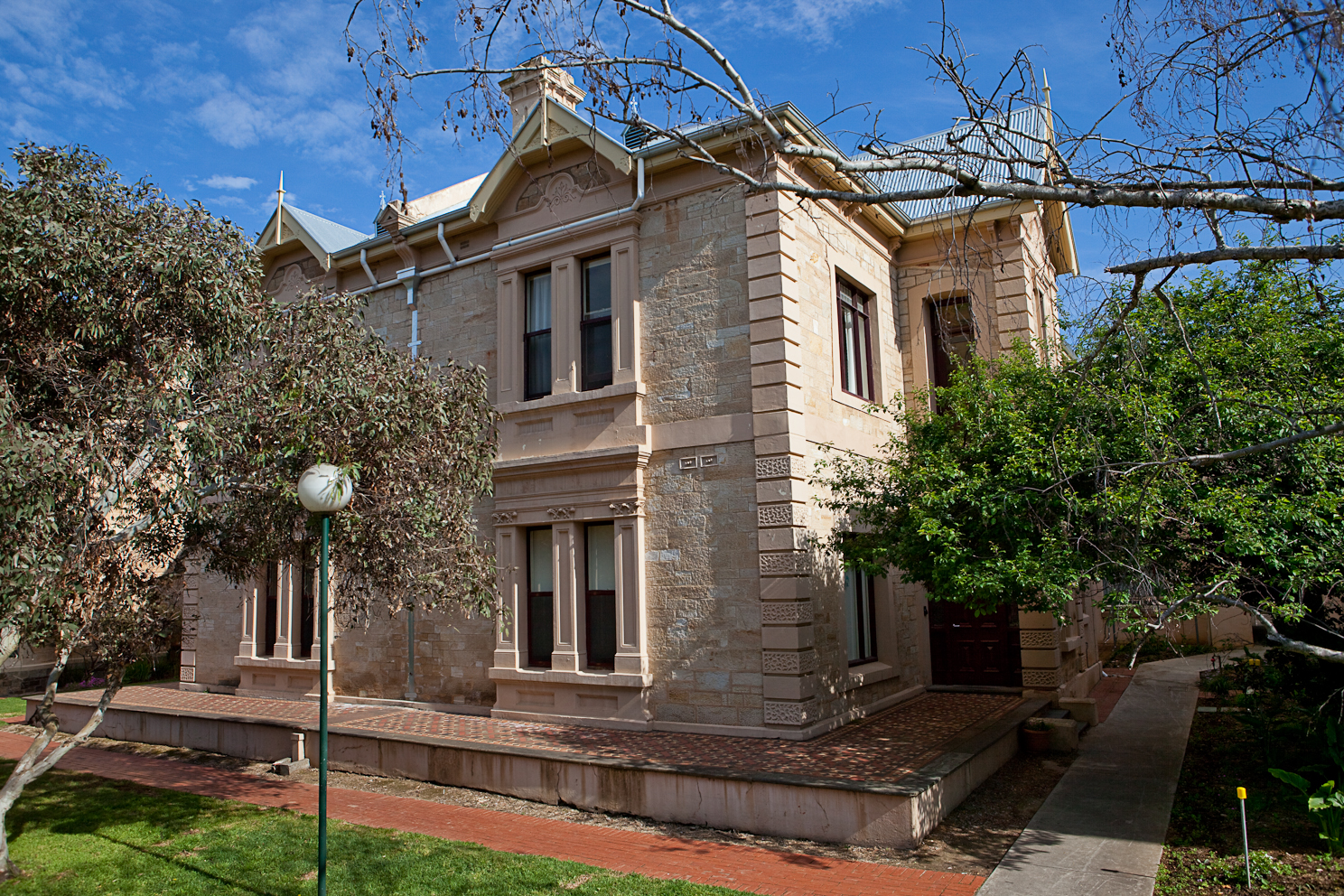
Abraham House, one of several heritage buildings that are part of Lincoln College

St Ann's College was founded as a women's college in 1947. The college's honorary founder is politician Josiah Symon who in 1924 suggested that female students should have somewhere to live. It became co-educational in 1973.

Lincoln College was founded in 1952 by the Methodist Church and named after the Lincoln College at the University of Oxford. Originally established as a men's college, it became co-residential in 1973. It features several heritage-listed buildings.

There are also other private student accommodation providers in the city centre and near other campuses. Additionally, the Roseworthy and Whyalla campuses manage their own accommodation for students studying at those locations.

== Notable people ==
=== Administration ===
Name	Years	Position
Pauline Carr	2024–present	Chancellor
Peter Høj and David Lloyd	2024–2026	Co-Vice Chancellors
Nicola Phillips	2026–present	Vice Chancellor

=== Alumni ===
Adelaide University alumni ostensibly include those of the two antecedent universities and their predecessor institutions; noting graduates of such institutions may only obtain an Adelaide University-branded transcript or parchment in the event their original issued copy is lost or damaged. Alumni and alumnae include the first female Australian prime minister Julia Gillard, the first female Australian foreign minister Julie Bishop, Singapore presidents Tony Tan and Ong Teng Cheong, the first Australian-born astronaut Andy Thomas, the first demonstrator of nuclear fusion Mark Oliphant, the founding editor-in-chief of Vogue China Angelica Cheung, singer-songwriter Guy Sebastian, the industrialist Edward Holden who founded Australian automobile manufacturer GM Holden, the speech therapist Lionel Logue who helped King George VI manage his stammer, the inventor of commercial sunscreen Milton Blake, Neil Weste whose advancements in wireless communications are widely used and several Olympians and Paralympians including Matthew Cowdrey. Incumbent office-holders include the state premier Peter Malinauskas, state governor Frances Adamson, the Human Rights Watch executive director Tirana Hassan, the national senate leader Penny Wong, and several federal cabinet ministers. The two universities have also produced a combined 117 Rhodes scholars, 173 Fulbright scholars and is associated with five Nobel laureates.

Notable alumni associated with the university:

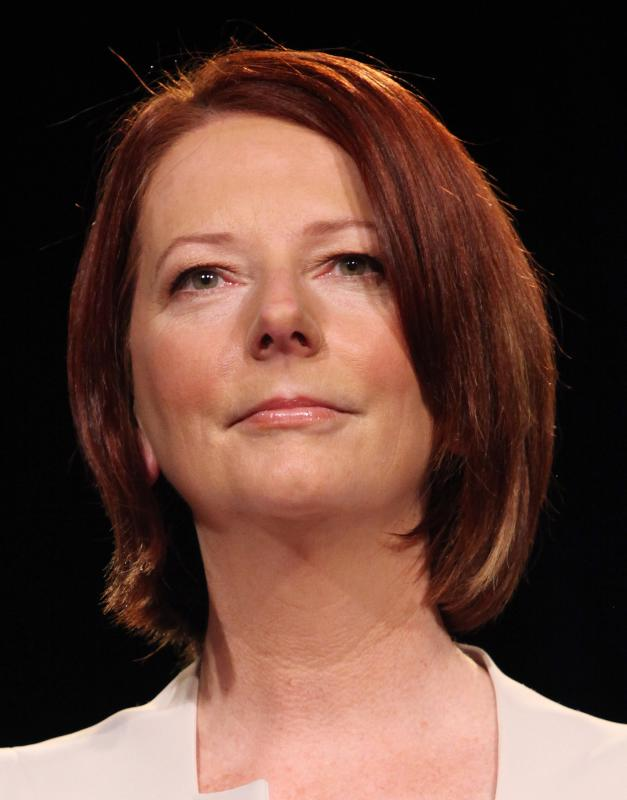
Julia Gillard
First female prime minister of Australia

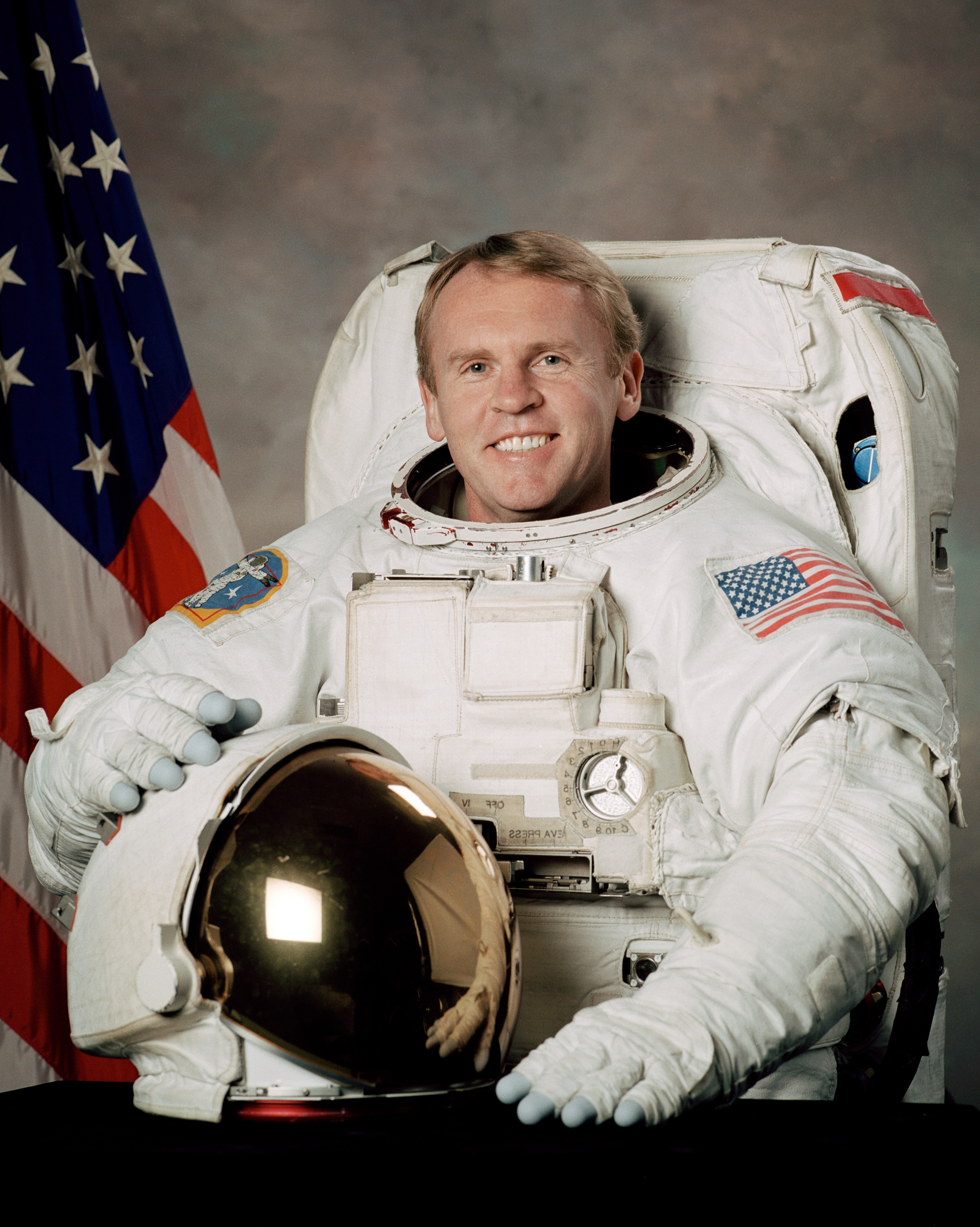
Andy Thomas
Aerospace engineer and first Australian-born astronaut

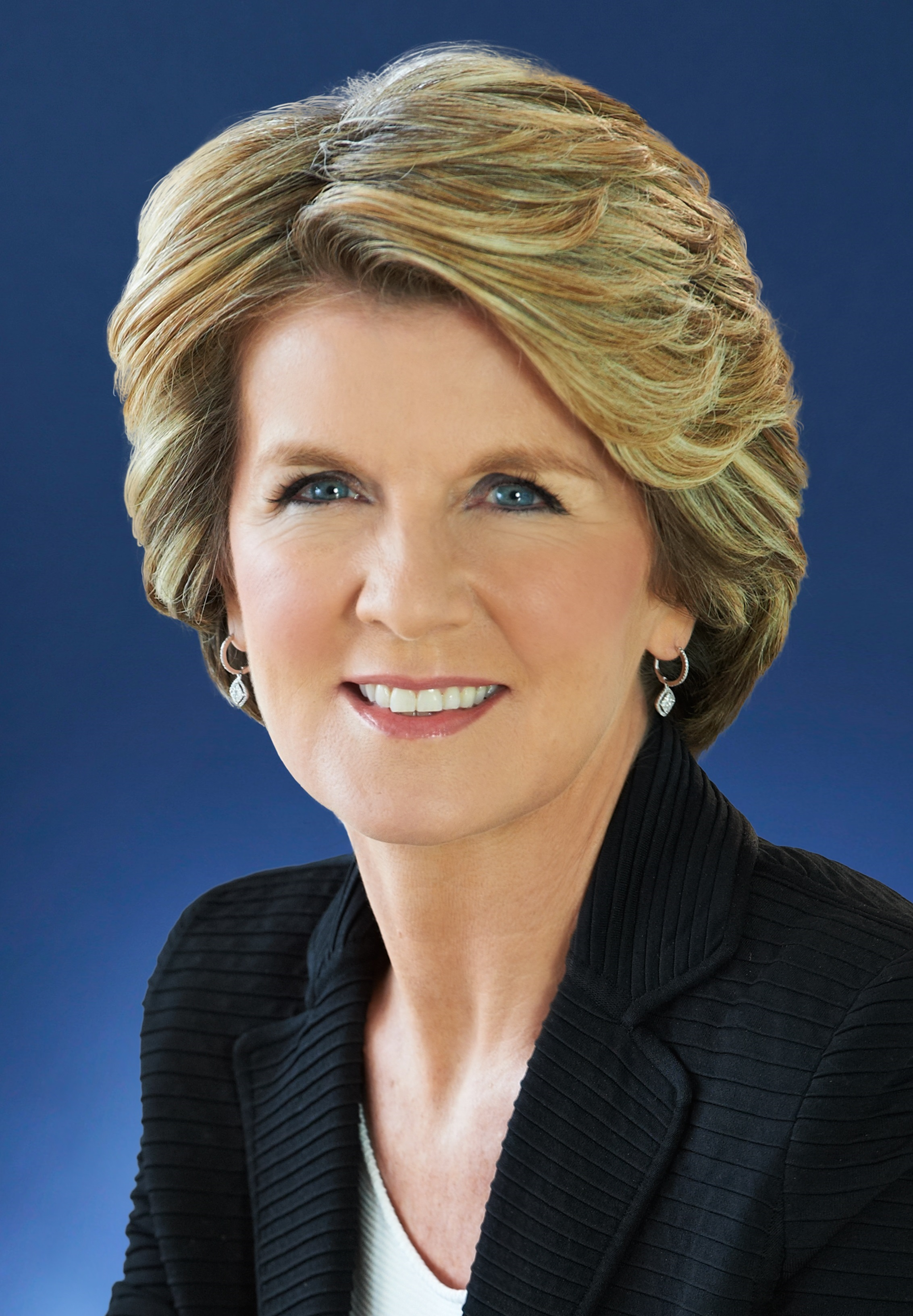
Julie Bishop
First female Minister for Foreign Affairs of Australia

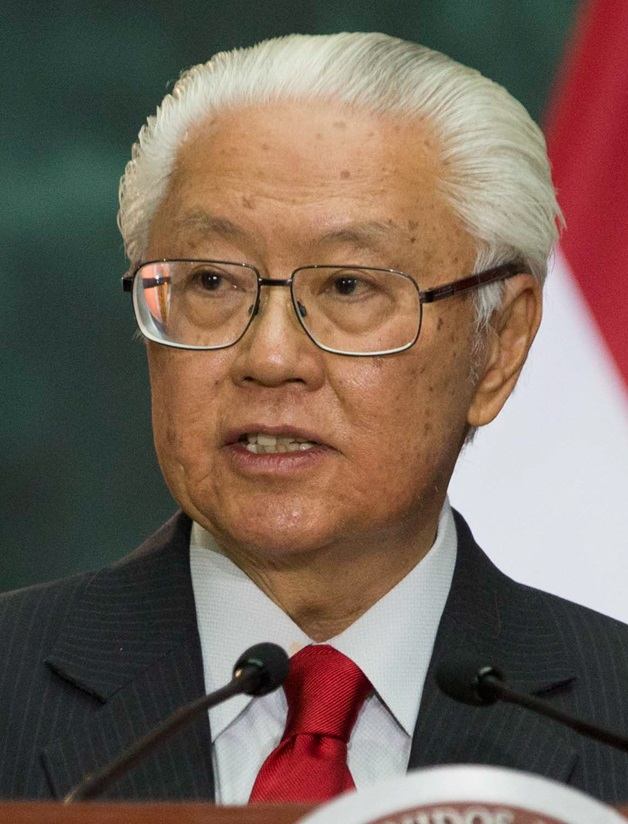
Tony Tan
7th President of the Republic of Singapore

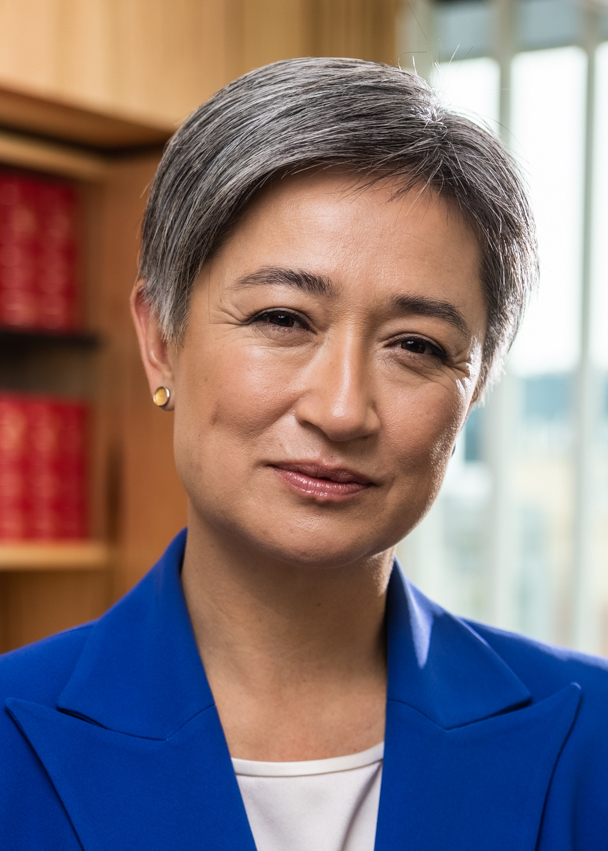
Penny Wong
Current Minister for Foreign Affairs and senate leader

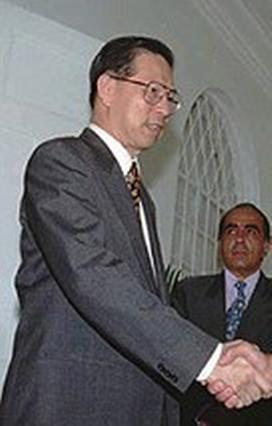
Ong Teng Cheong
5th President of the Republic of Singapore

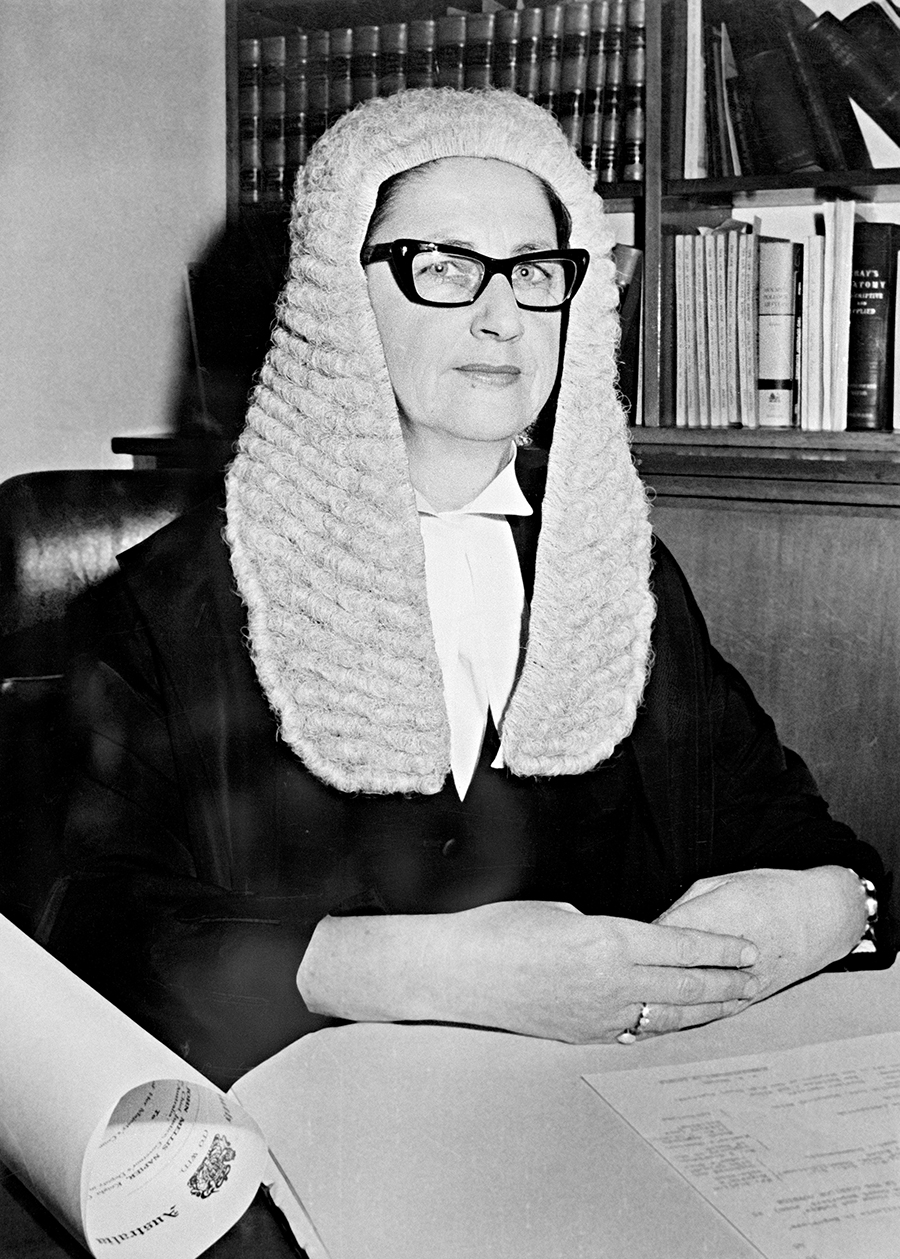
Roma Mitchell
First female Australian judge, chancellor and state governor

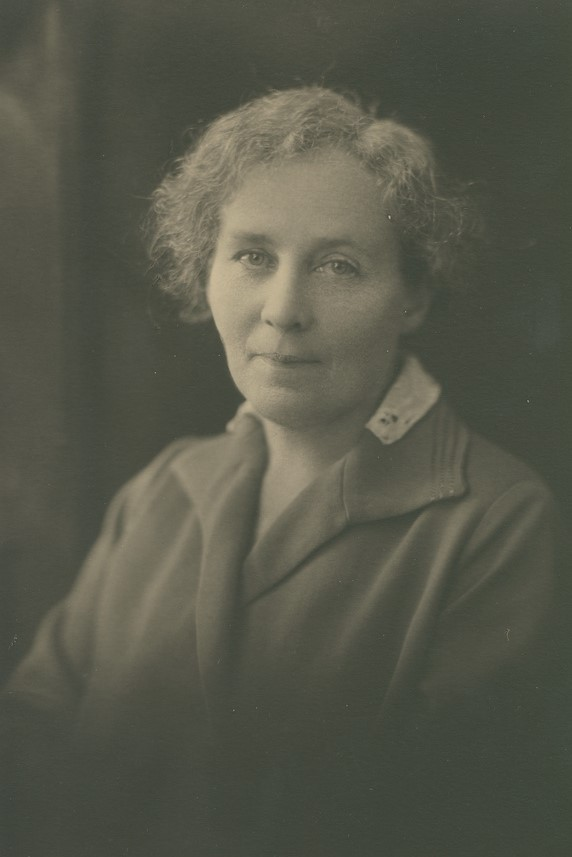
Laura Margaret Hope
First female surgeon in Australia

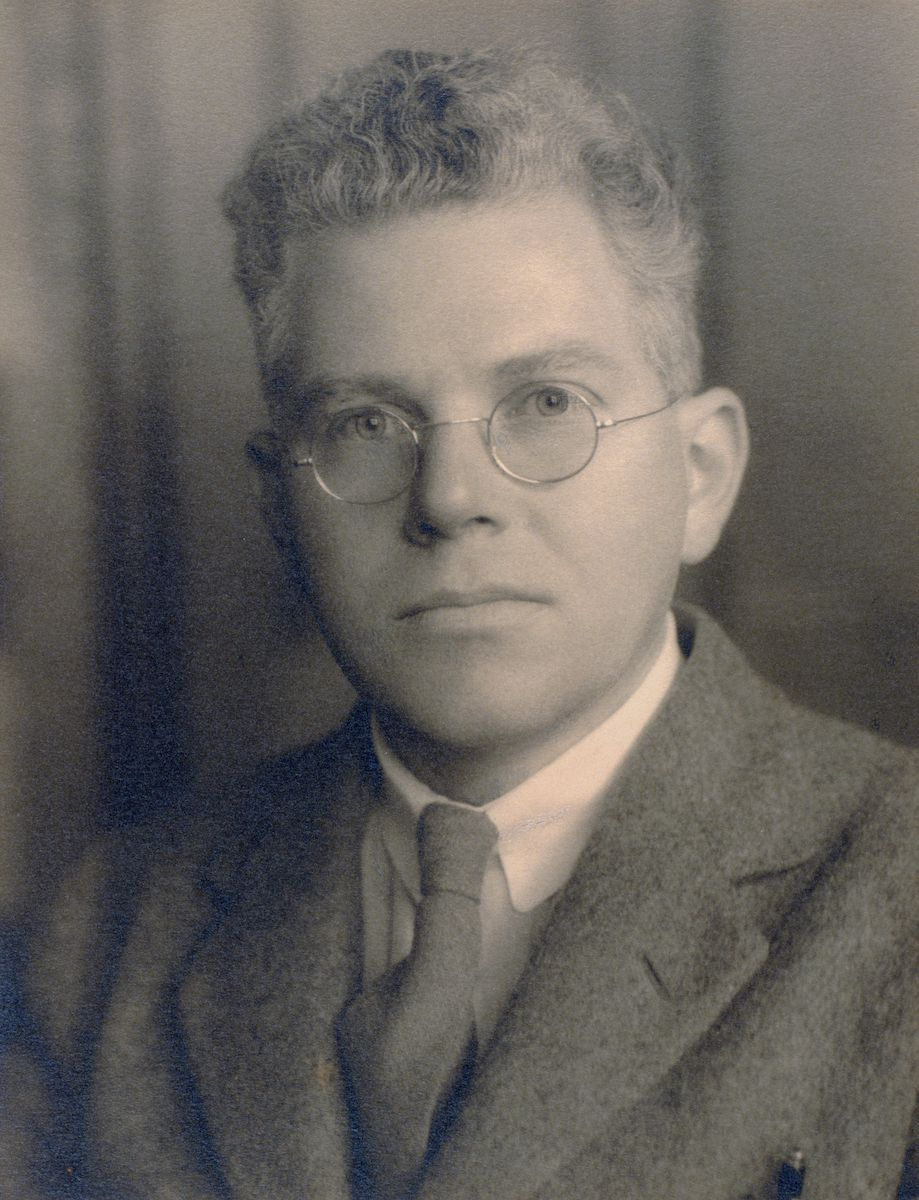
Mark Oliphant
Nuclear physicist and humanitarian

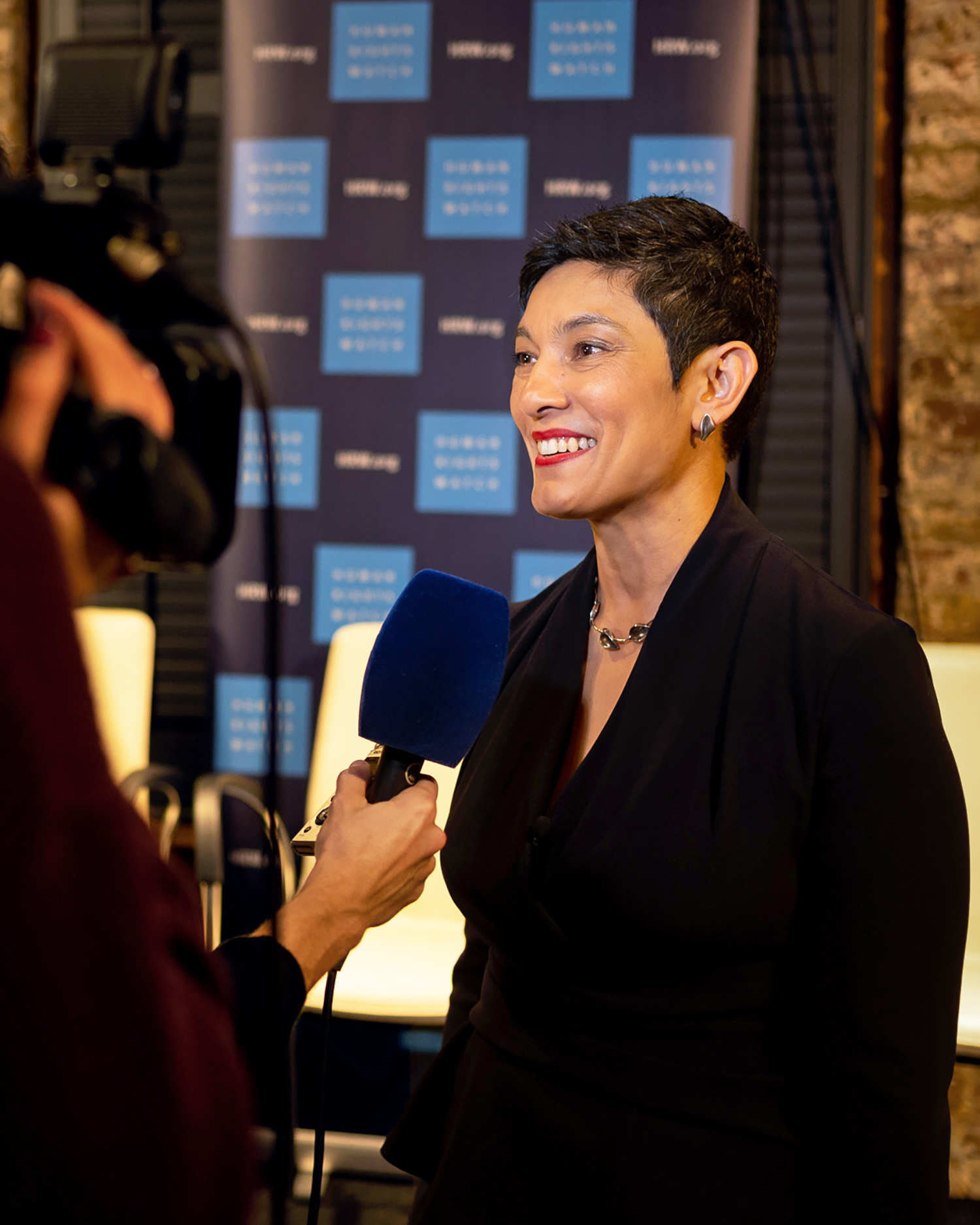
Tirana Hassan
Executive director of Human Rights Watch

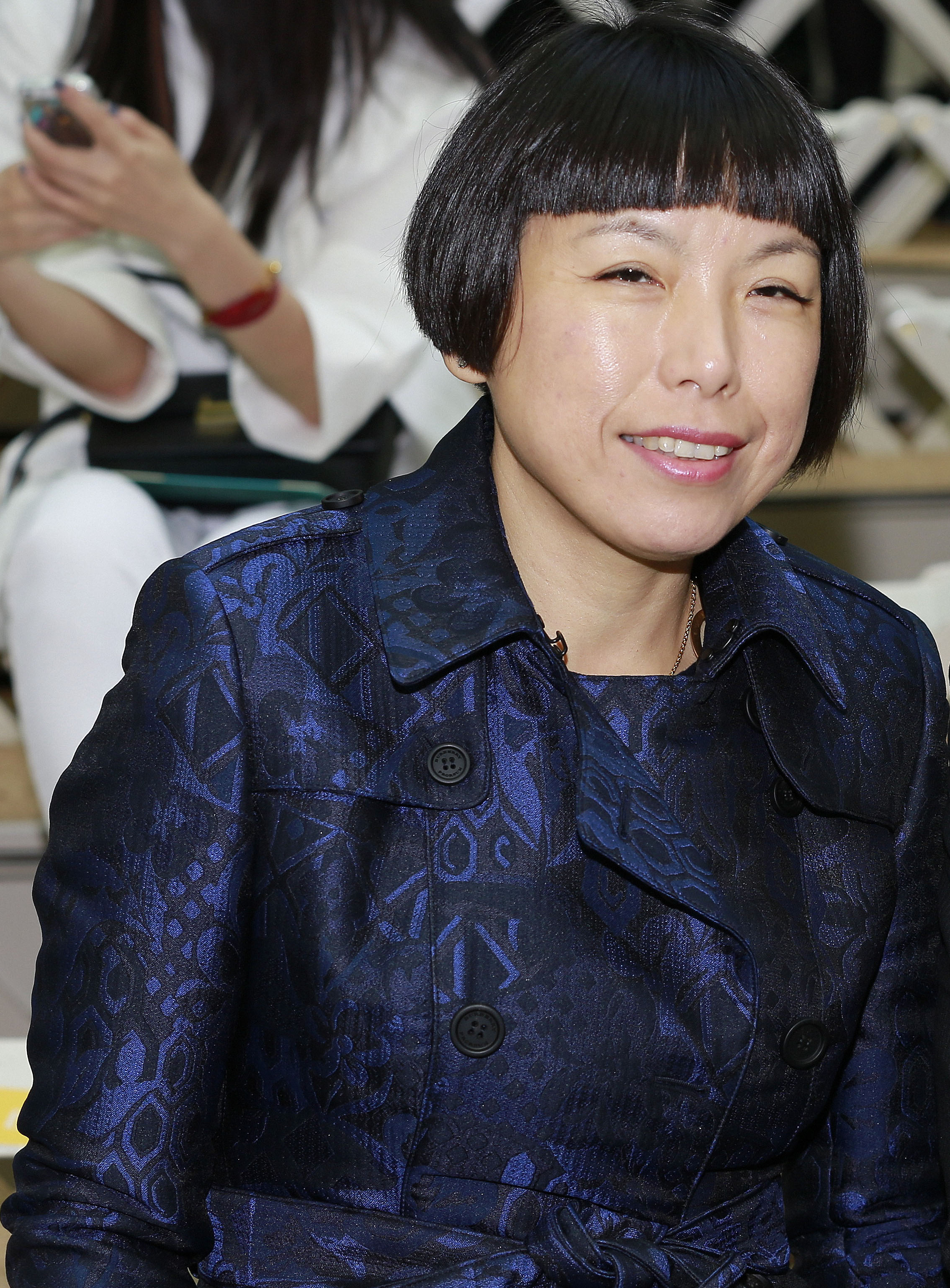
Angelica Cheung
Founding editor-in-chief of Vogue China

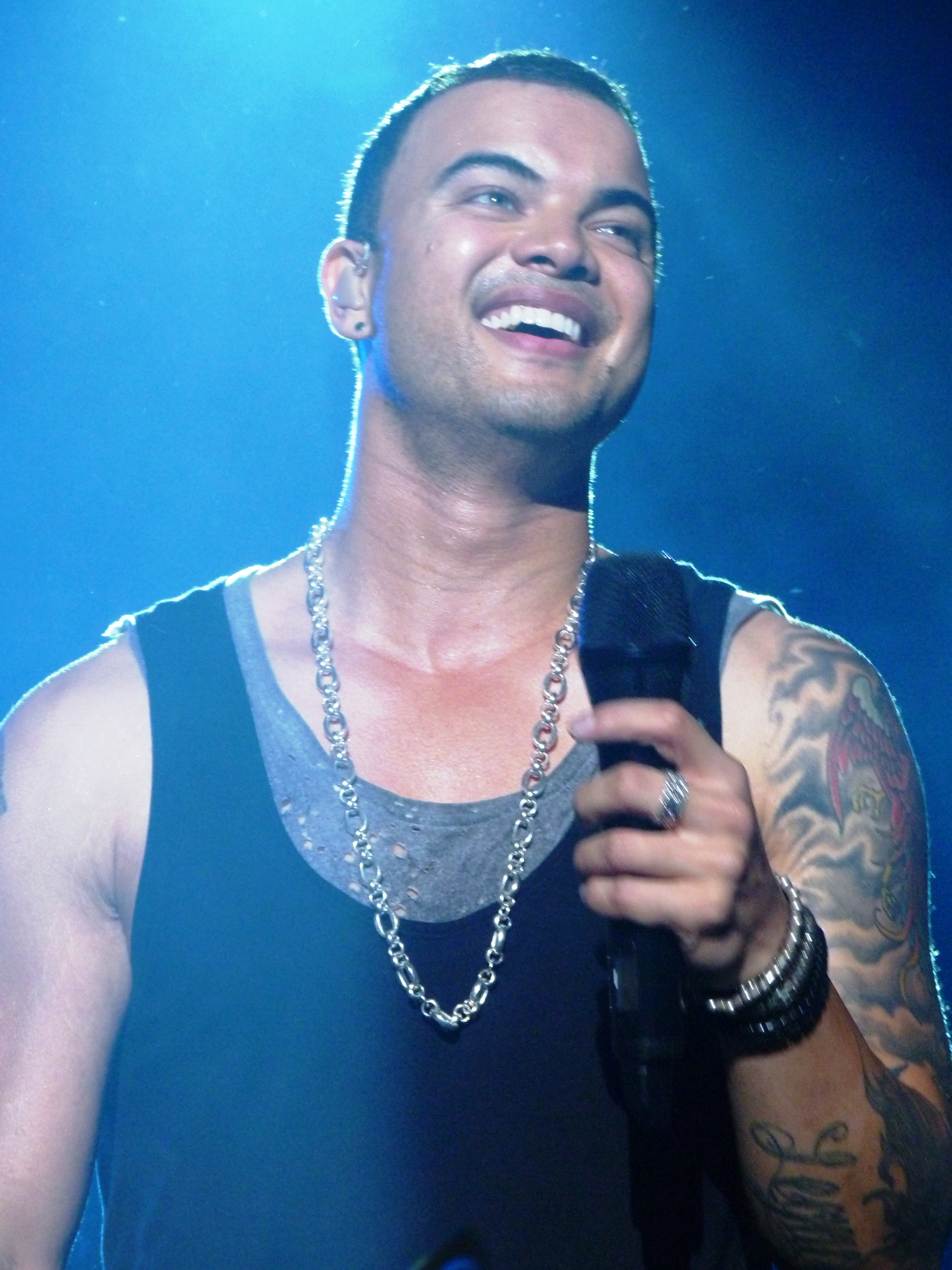
Guy Sebastian
Singer-songwriter and musician

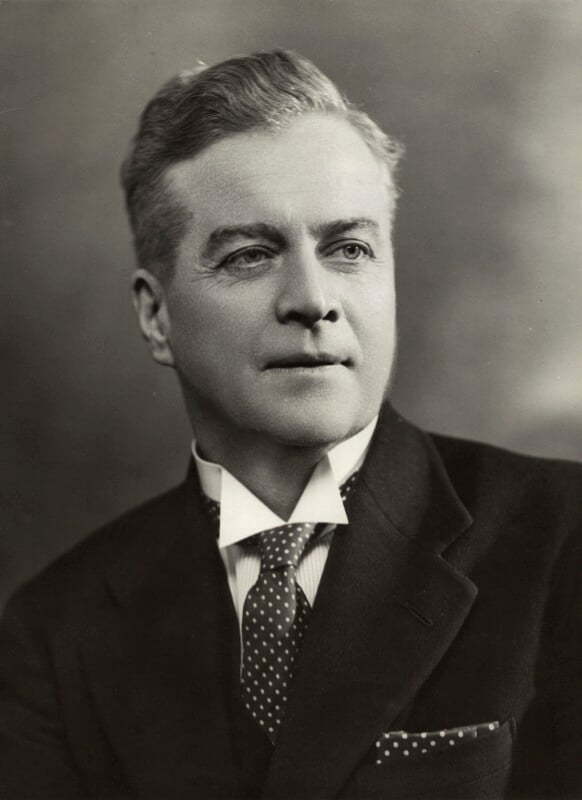
Lionel Logue
Speech and language therapist

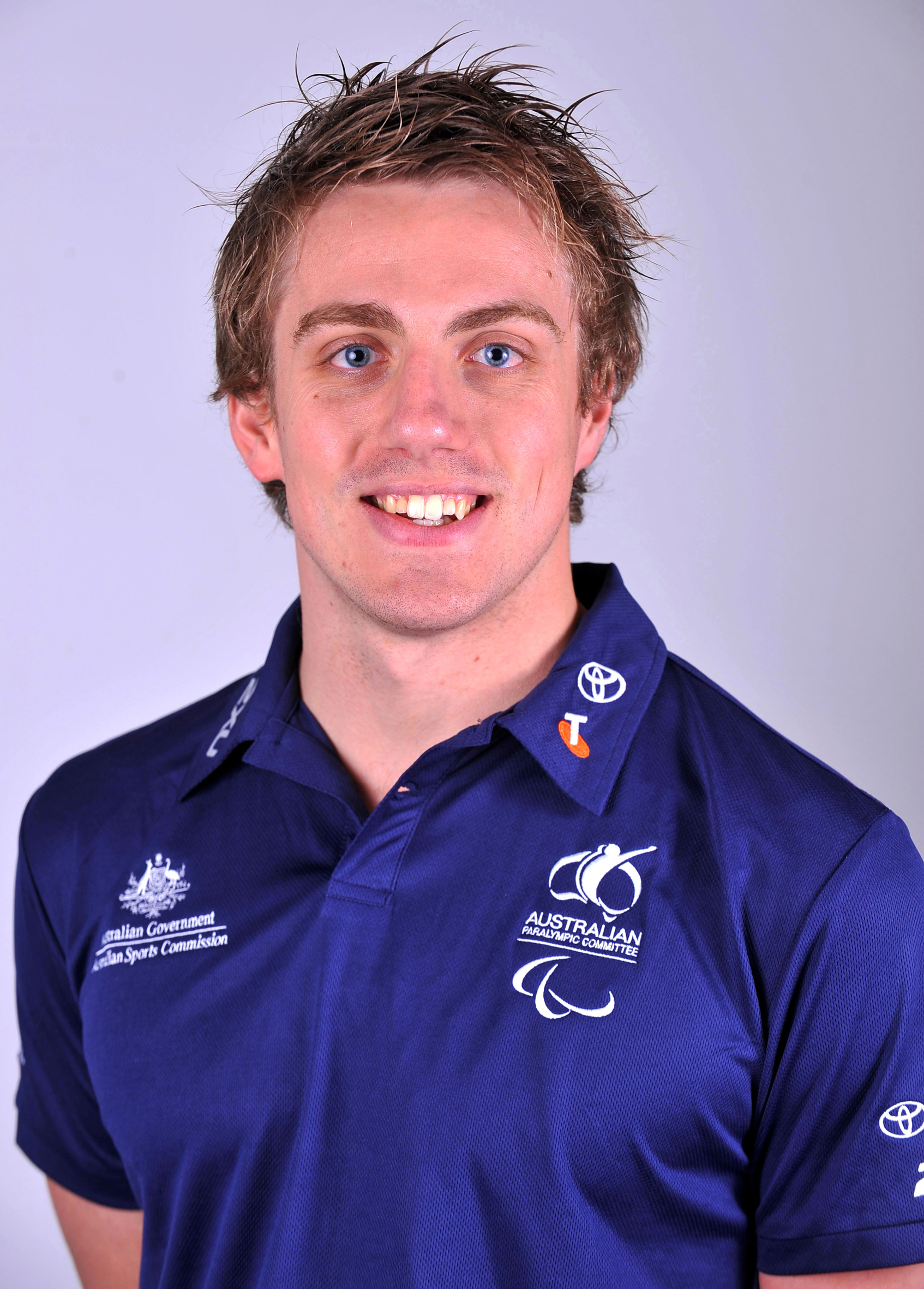
Matthew Cowdrey
Paralympian and state politician

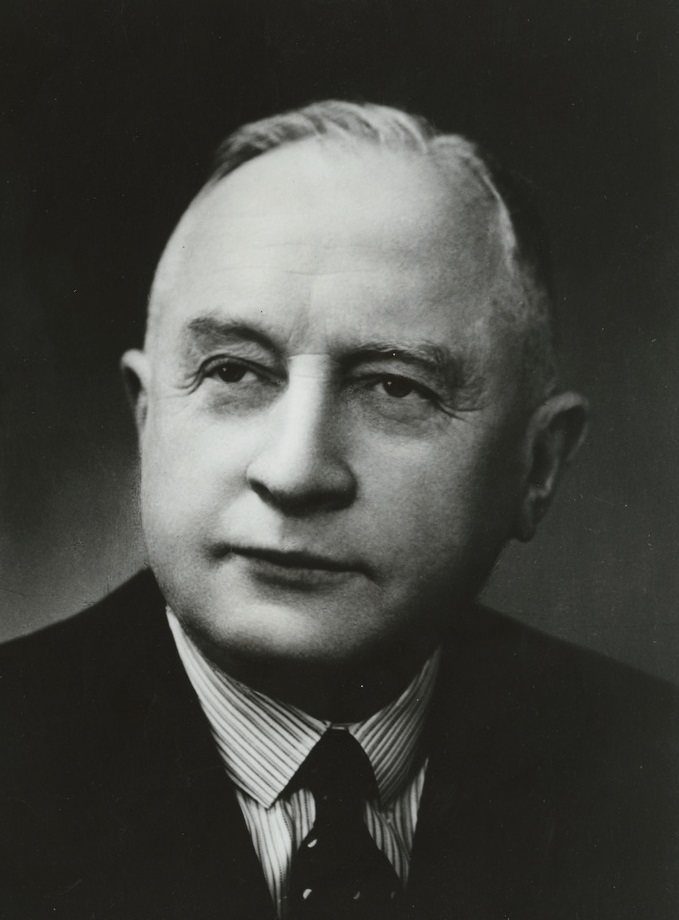
Edward Holden
Industrialist and founder of GM Holden

=== Nobel laureates ===
Nobel laureates associated with the university:

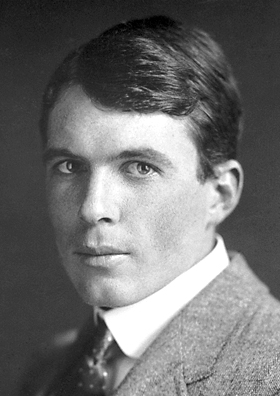
Lawrence Bragg
Physicist

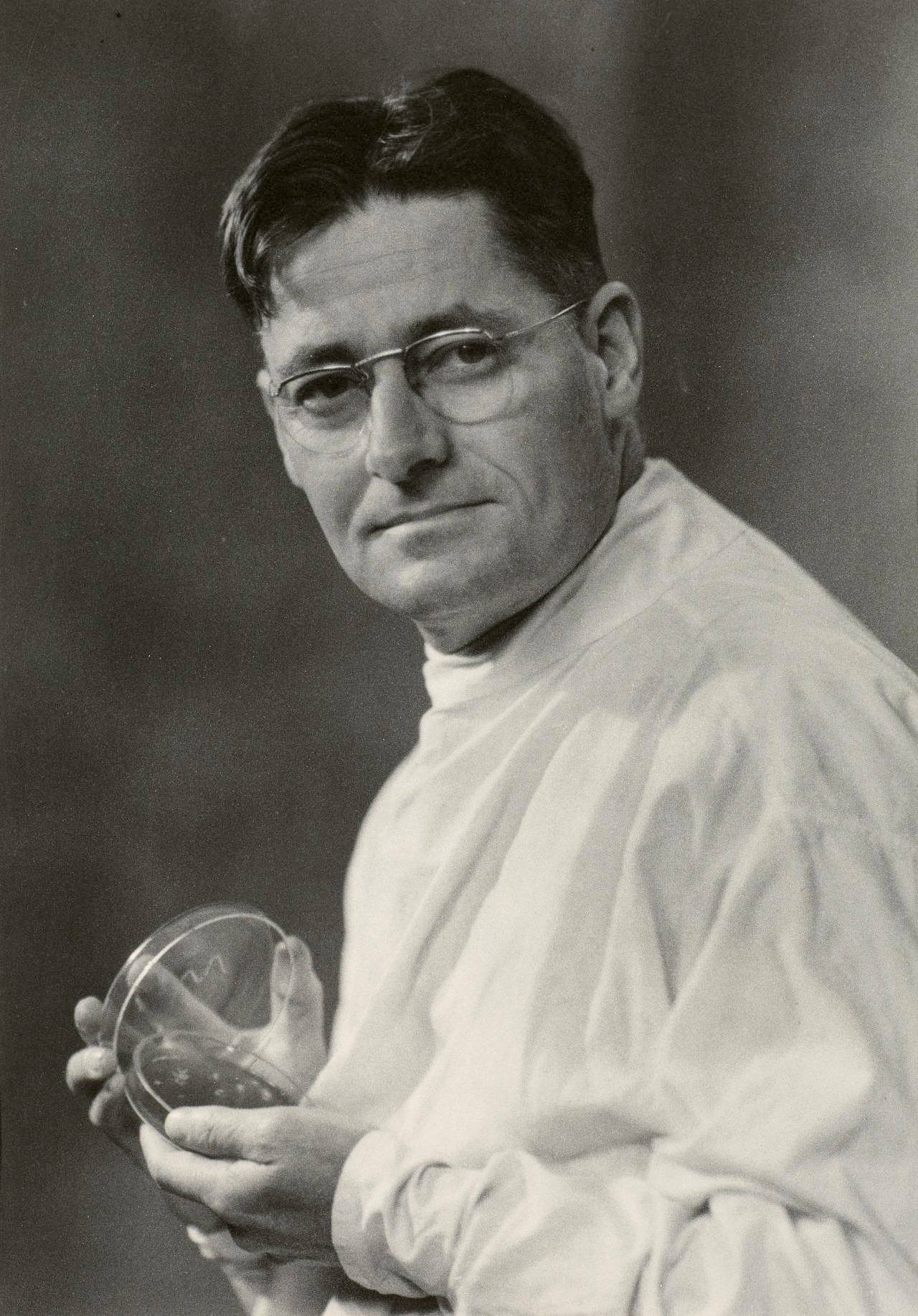
Howard Florey
Pharmacologist

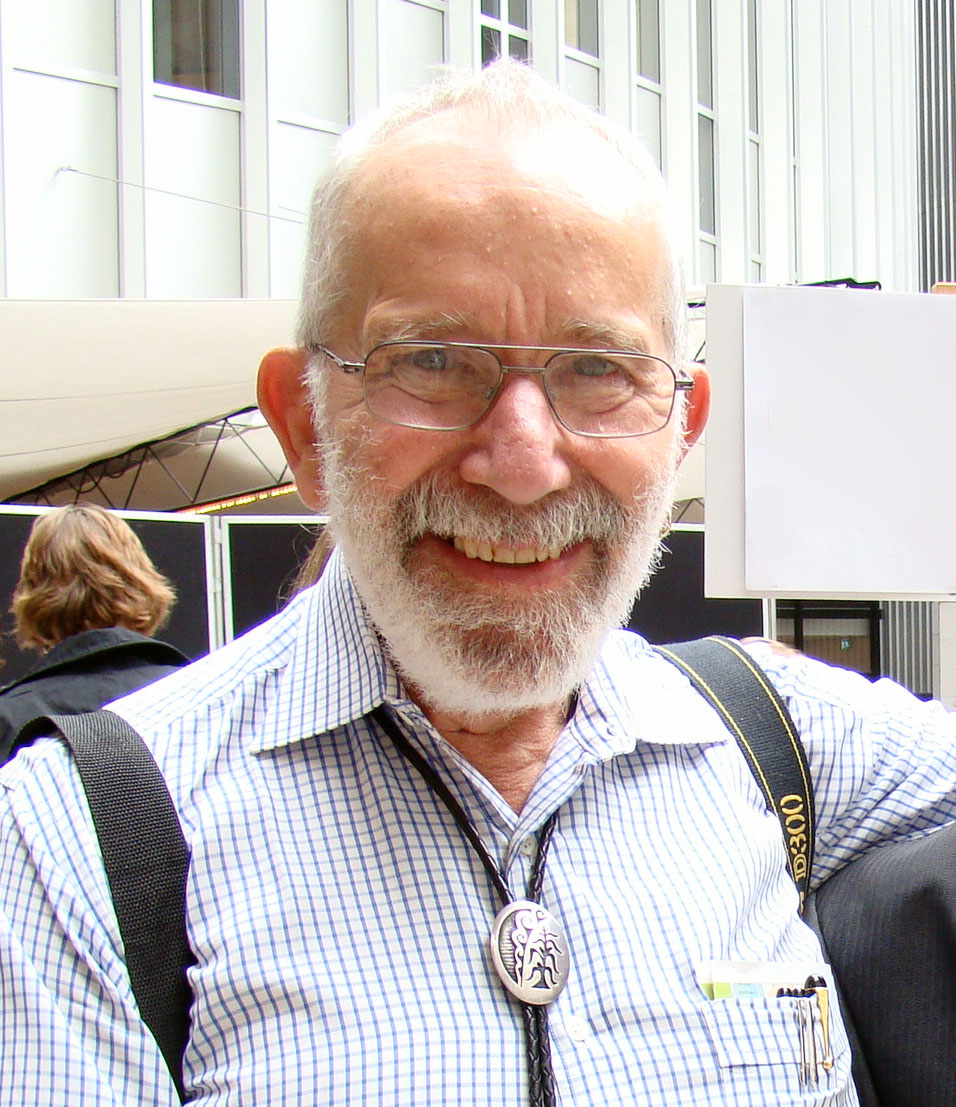
Robin Warren
Pathologist

Nobel laureates associated with the university include Lawrence Bragg, who held the record for the youngest laureate ever until 2014, co-recipient with his father William Henry Bragg for their work in x-ray crystallography in 1915. Howard Florey, a pharmacologist and pathologist, shared the 1945 Nobel Prize in Physiology or Medicine with Alexander Fleming and Ernst Chain for their role in the development of penicillin. J. M. Coetzee, a novelist and member of the faculty, had won the Nobel Prize in Literature in 2003. Robin Warren was a pathologist who, alongside Barry Marshall, discovered that peptic ulcers were largely caused by the infection Helicobacter pylori, graduated in 1961. Warren and Marshall won the Nobel Prize in Physiology or Medicine for their discovery in 2005.

== Controversies ==
=== Initial merger discussions ===
The University of Adelaide and the University of South Australia had previously engaged to discuss a merger in 2018 but failed due to disagreements from the latter about the post-merger leadership structure.

=== Opinion polling on staff ===
The National Tertiary Education Union SA conducted a survey of 1,100 university staff and found that three-quarters of respondents were against the merger. In addition, the state government has been accused of coercing the universities to agree to merge, indicating that a commission of inquiry would be established to find ways to compel the two universities to merge had their councils refused to do so, with less financial support available.

Andrew Miller, the state secretary of the union, raised concerns that staff were under "extreme psychosocial pressure" to meet the 2026 launch deadline. Backing his claims with communications from the Integration Management Office staff responsible for merging the two institutions, he added that the "Game of Thrones" perception among staff competing "for the final spots of the new Adelaide University" was causing tensions, breakdowns and disharmony. The institutions' vice-chancellors David Lloyd and Peter Høj criticised the claims, referring to them as "whispers of Little Birds or Littlefingers", though they had previously admitted that the "two-by-two approach across the board" was "not as linear as first conceived".

In 2025, a FOI document obtained by The Australian found an increase in bullying and harassment reports at the University of Adelaide following the announcement of the merger. It added concerns from staff that the merger would result in a "meat grinder producing poorly educated students" that would be seen as "walking dollar signs".

The post-merger plan to switch to a trimester academic calendar has also been criticised by the union whose internal poll showed that more than 4 in 5 members were against the move.

=== Land re-development ===
In February 2024, the State Government drew criticism for its plans to convert land it had purchased from two University of South Australia campuses for housing and commercial re-development. As part of the merger agreement, the land was to be sold to the South Australian Government for A$114.5 million and leased back to the university for a period of up to 10 years. Following the release of several internal FOI documents retrieved by InDaily from the Premier's Office, it was later revealed that the land was "earmarked for future development" for residential and commercial purposes.

The original media release replaced the phrase with "short-term transitional lease to university", referring to the leaseback period of 10 years, following concerns from UniSA vice-chancellor David Lloyd that the original draft would "create enormous community reaction which will be particularly unhelpful at this time". The land sales account for the entirety of the Magill campus and approximately 50% of the Mawson Lakes campus.

=== Elimination of in-person lectures ===
In September 2024, internal documents announced a shift away from face-to-face lectures in favour of rich digital learning activities. Dr Andrew Miller, division secretary of the National Tertiary Education Union's South Australia branch said that the decision "flies in the face of co-creation and professional autonomy and expertise".

== Gallery ==
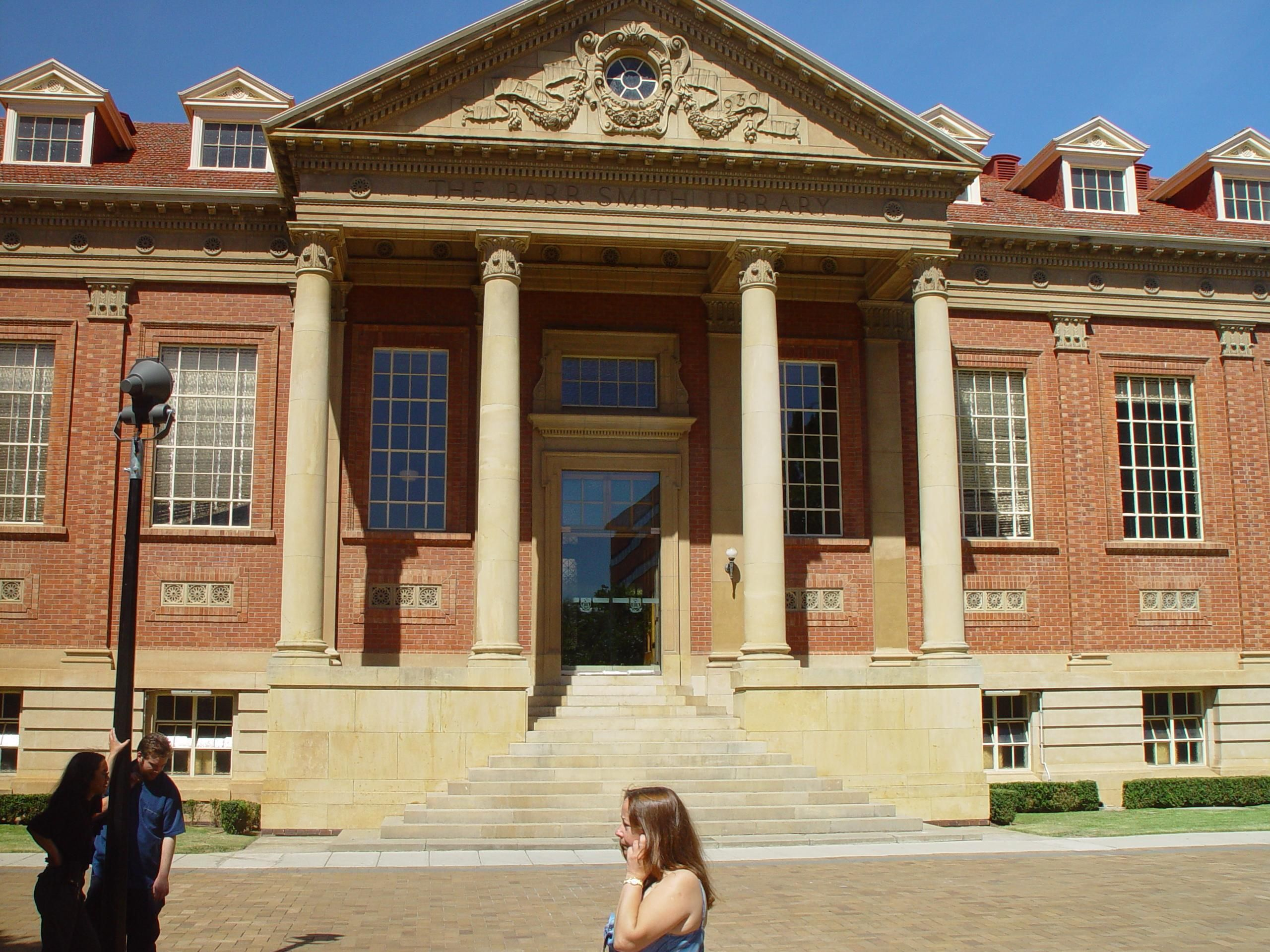
Barr Smith Library

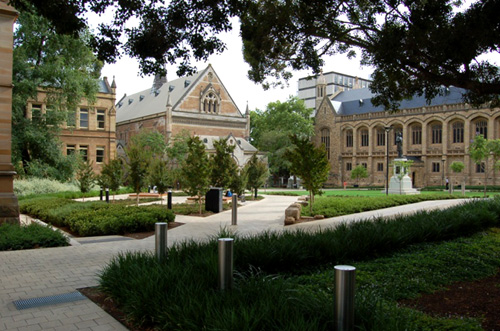
University buildings

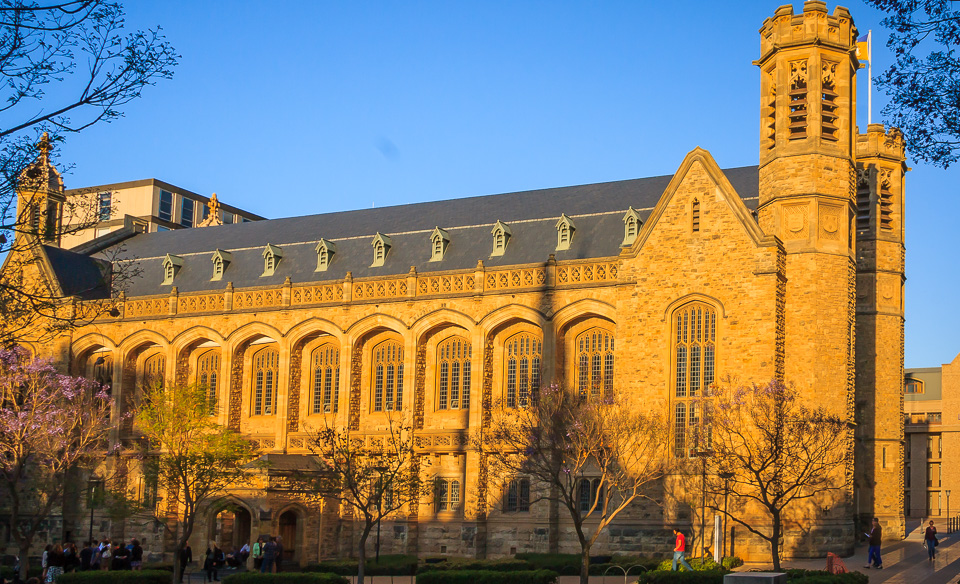
Bonython Hall during sunset

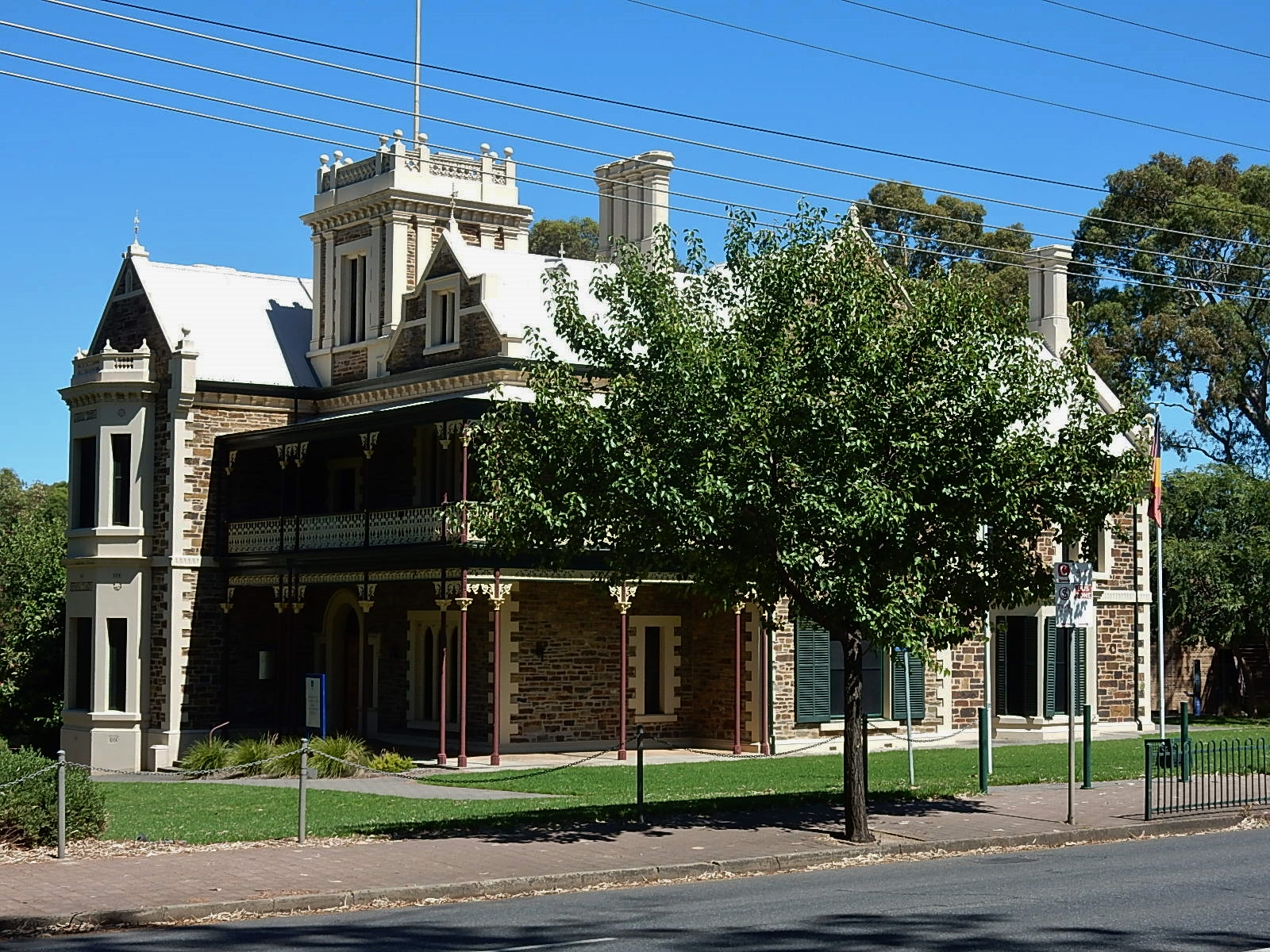
Murray House in Magill

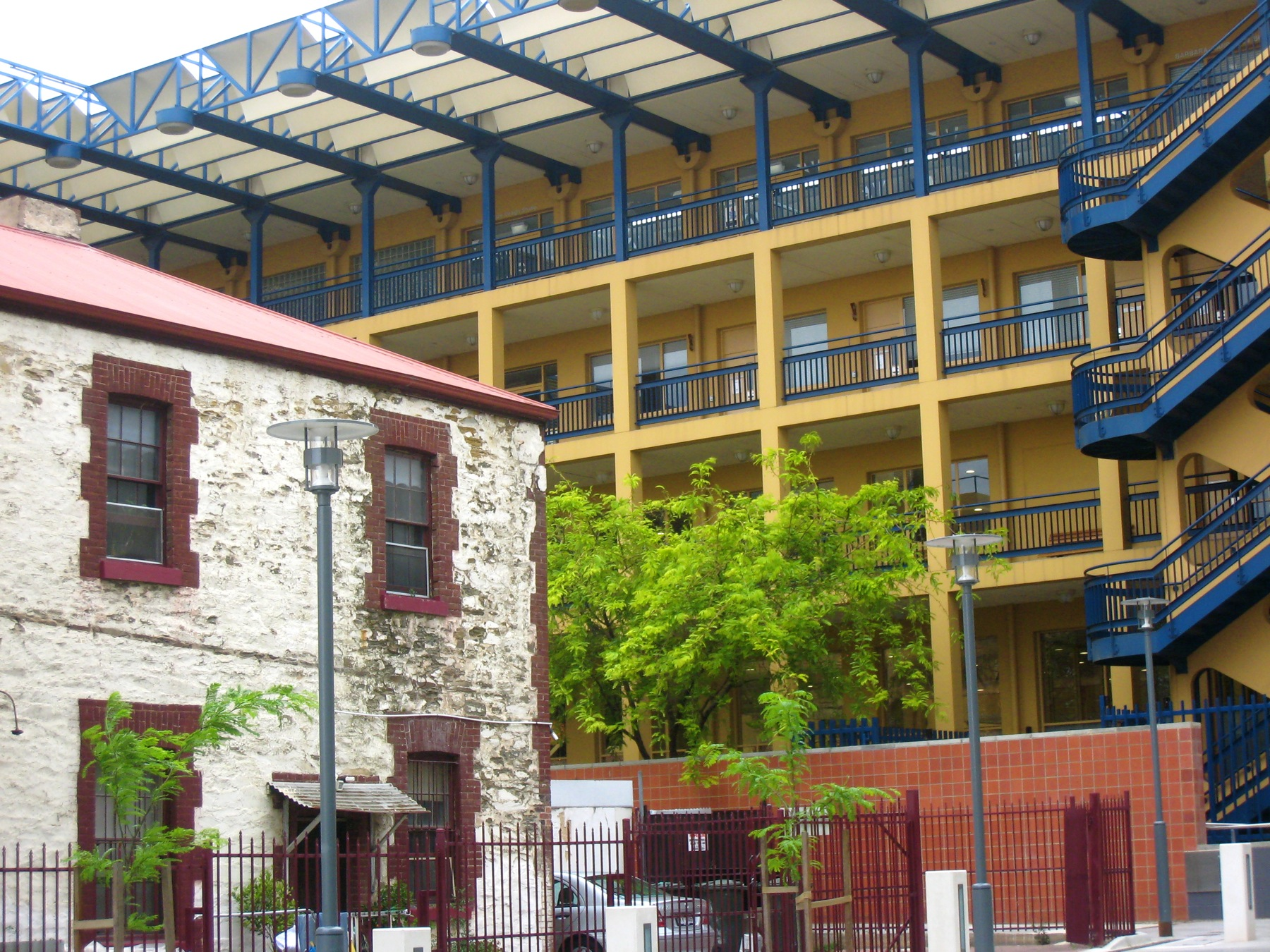
Buildings on the east end

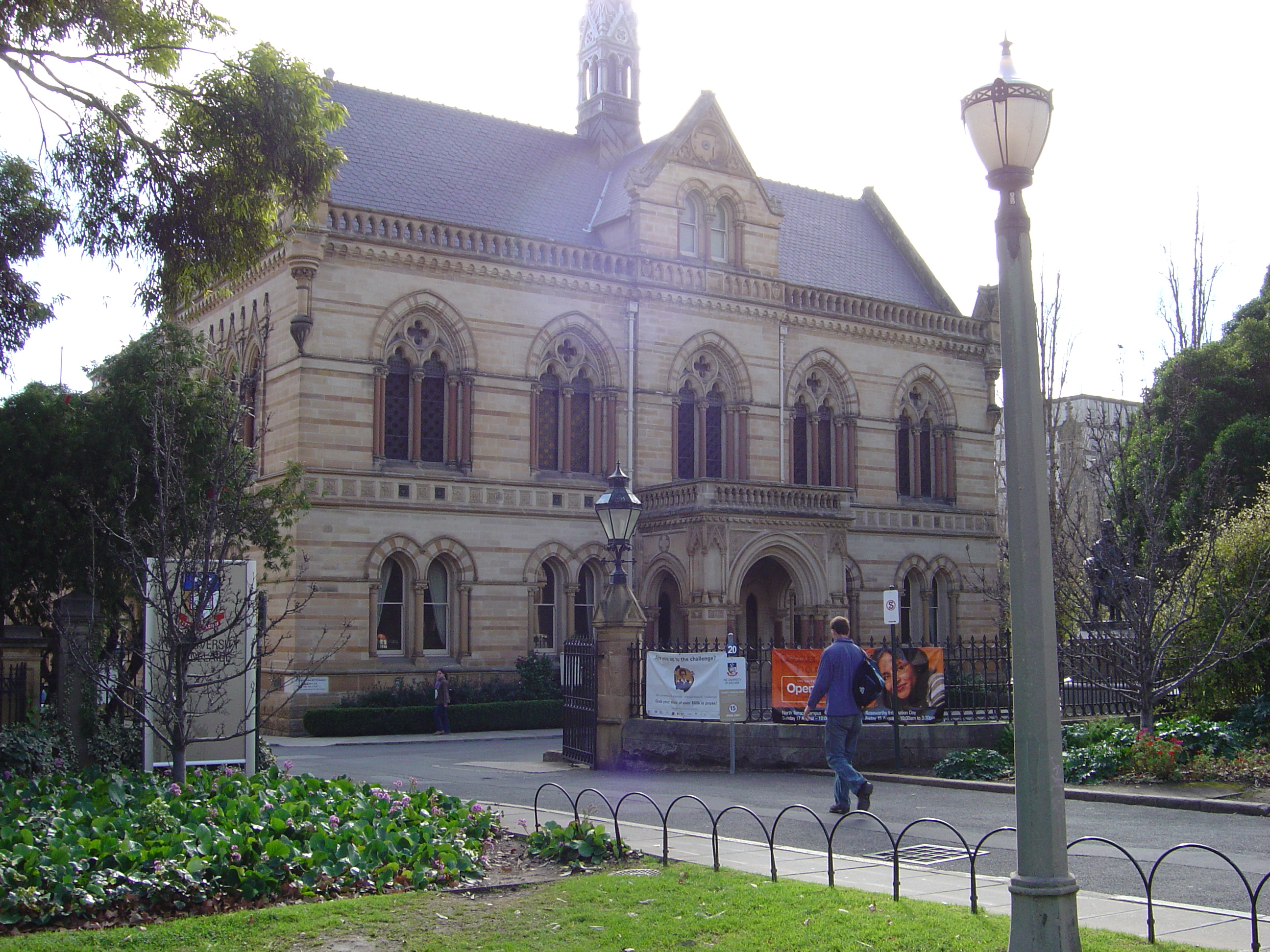
Mitchell Building

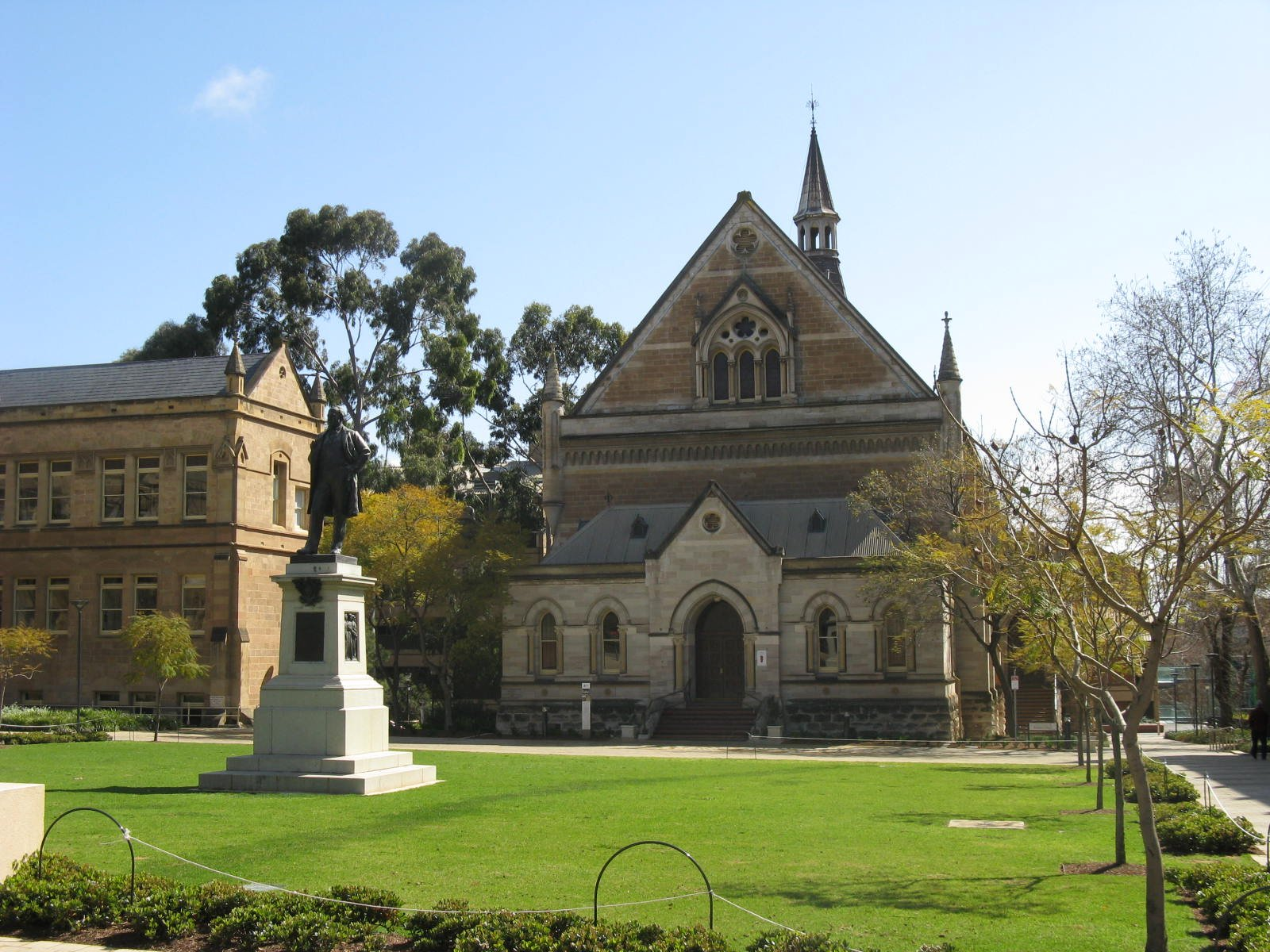
Elder Conservatorium

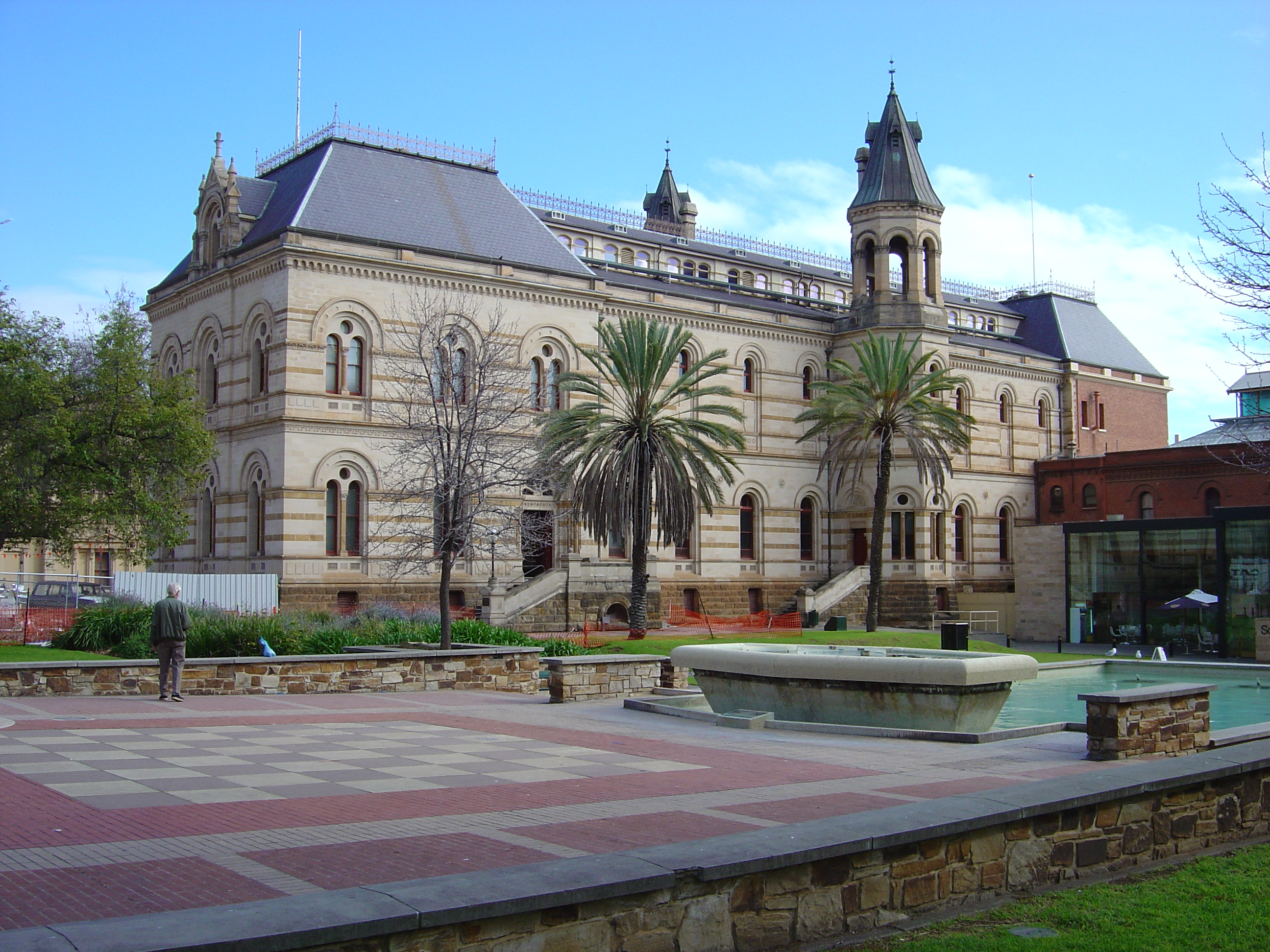
SA State Library

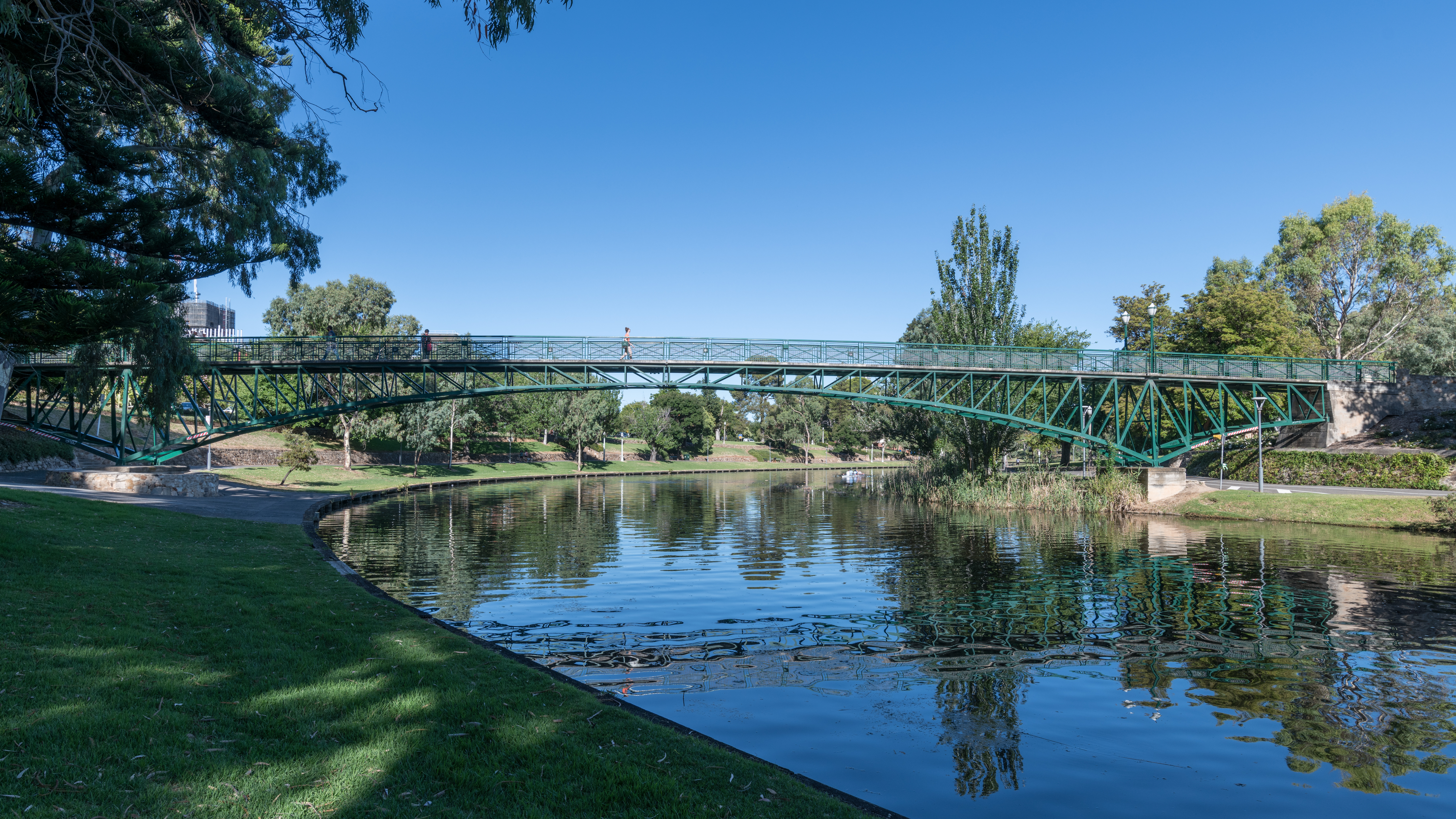
Adelaide University Footbridge

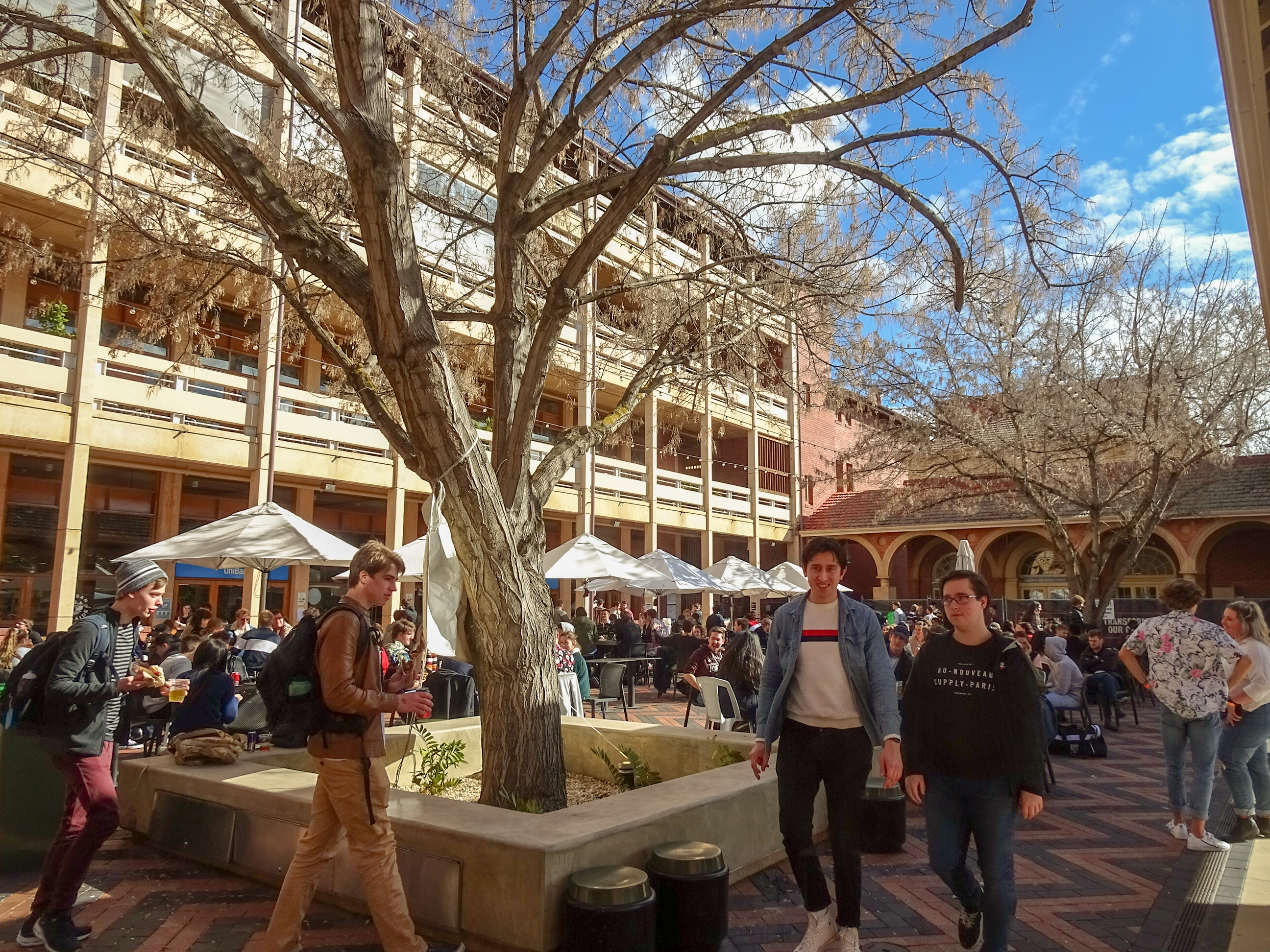
Courtyard with students

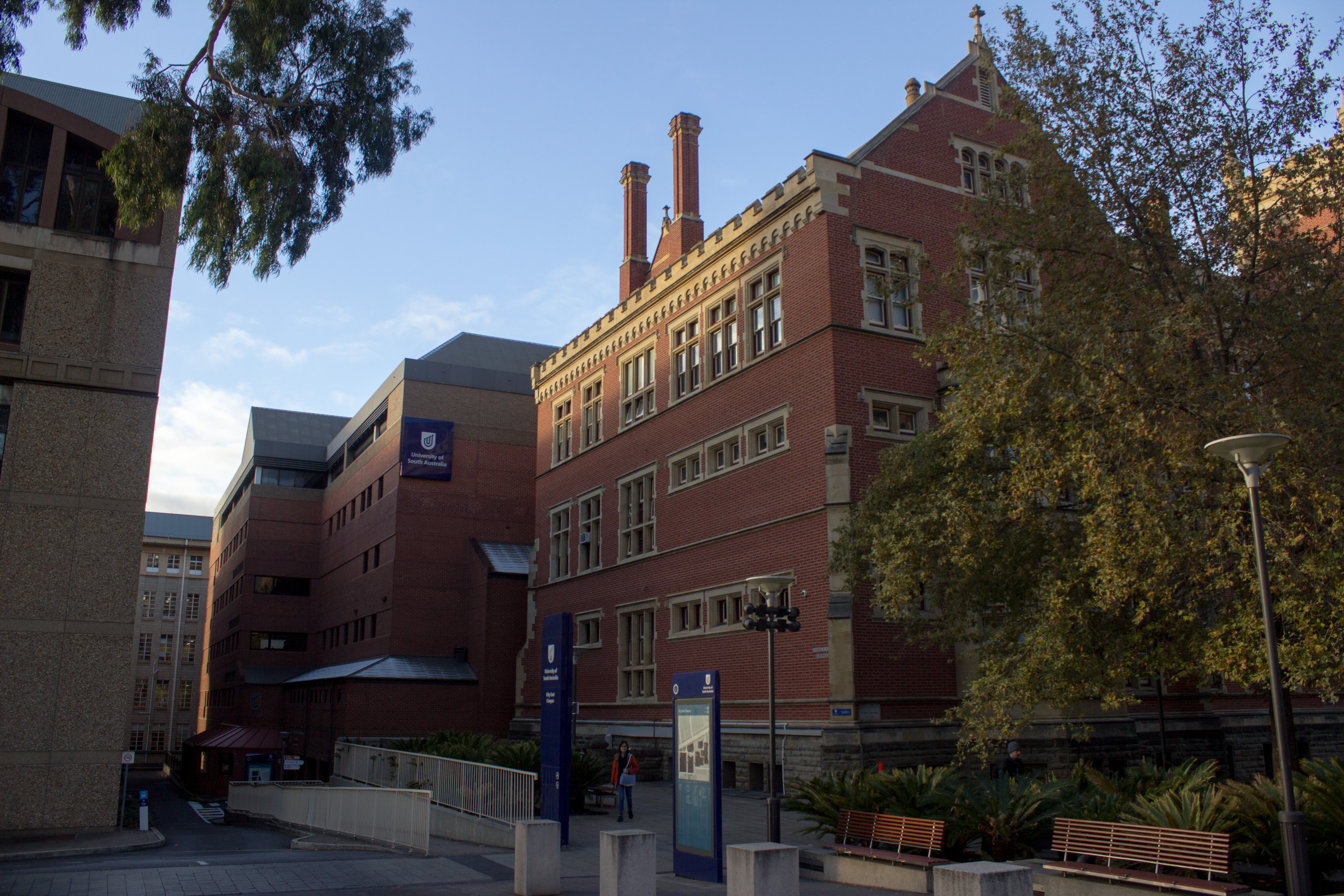
East side of Brookman Building

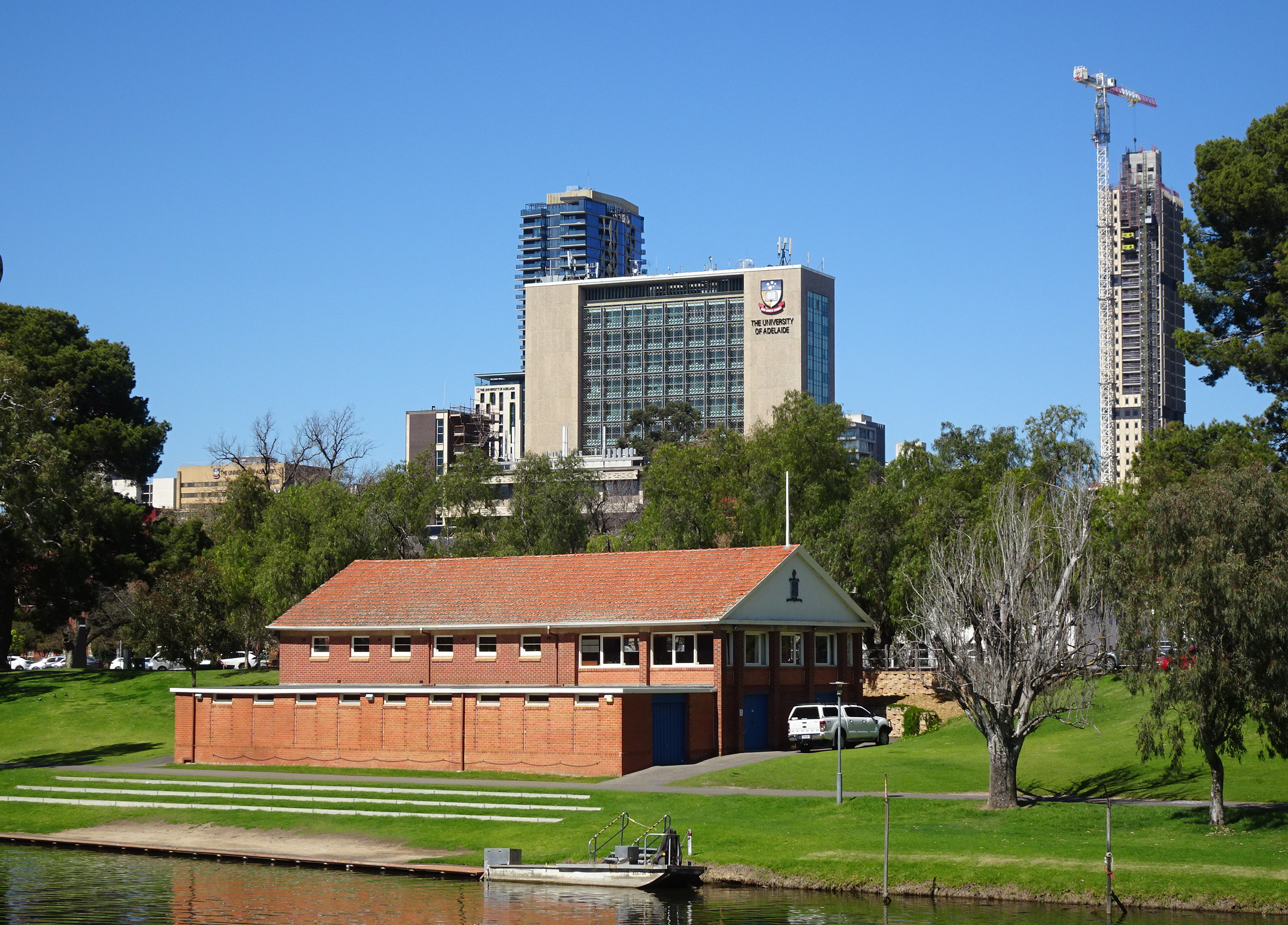
View across the River Torrens

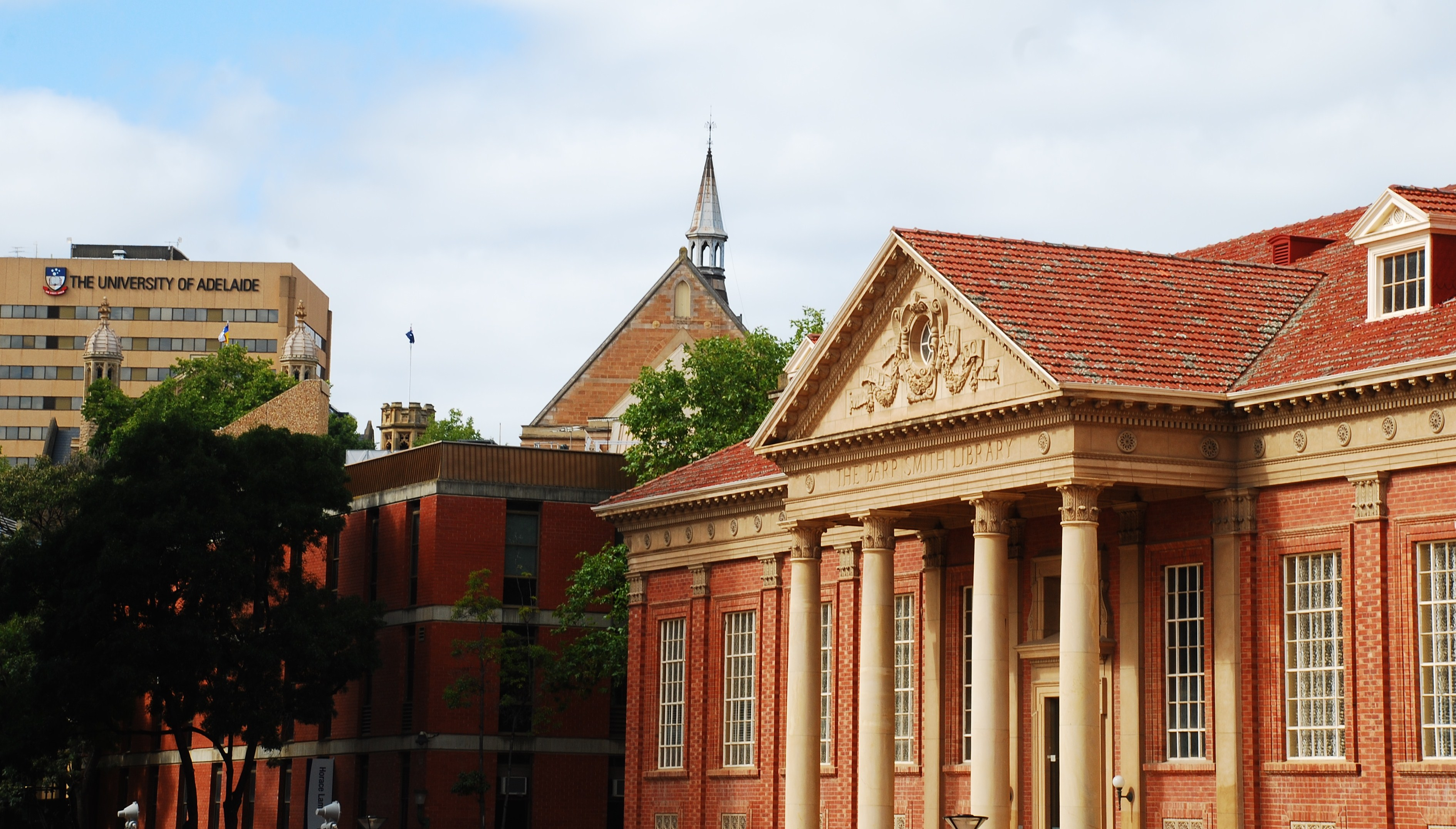
View across Barr Smith Library

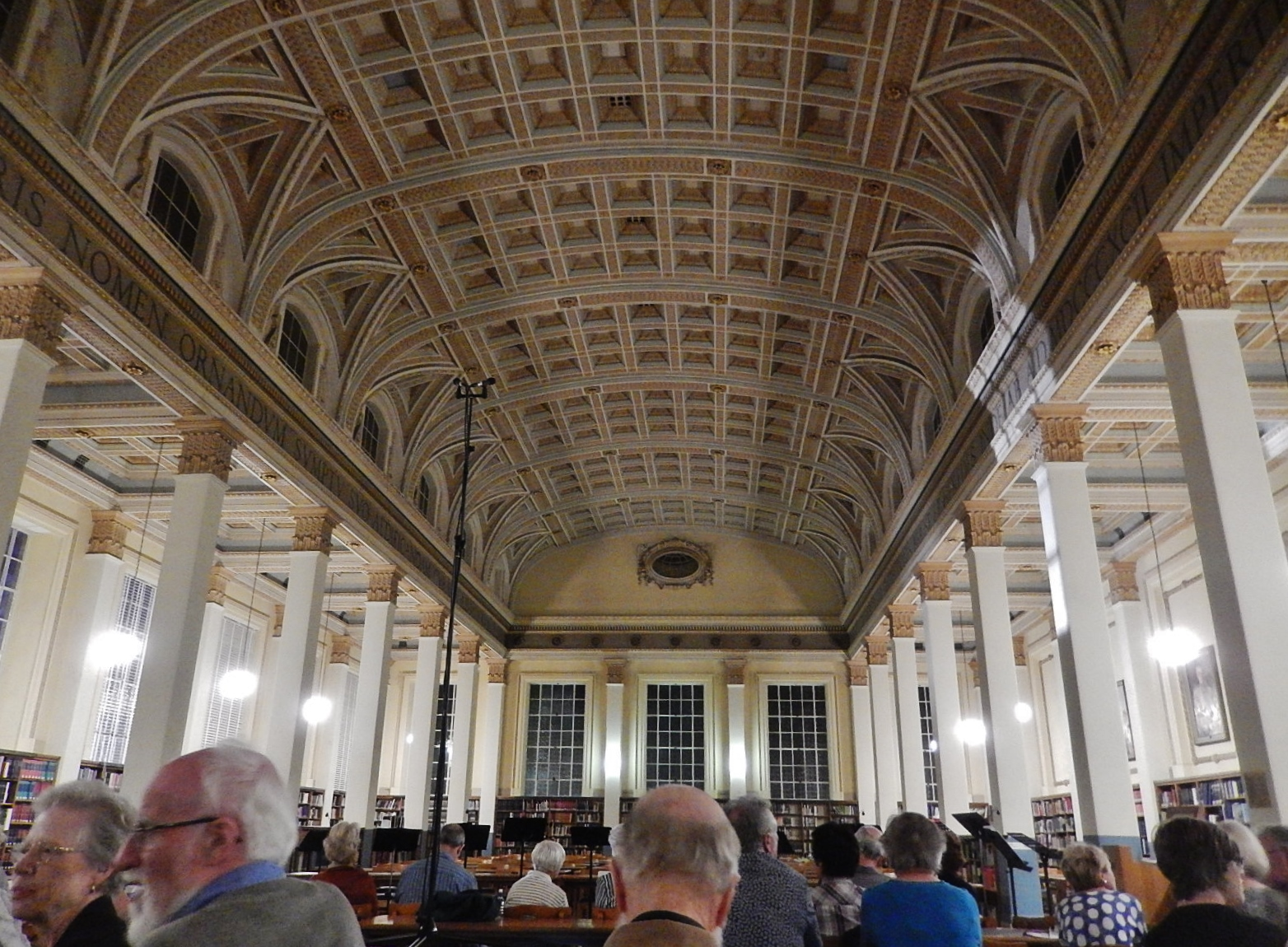
Barr Smith Library ceiling

== See also ==
- List of universities in Australia
- Education in Australia
- University of Adelaide
- University of South Australia
- Elder Conservatorium of Music
- Roseworthy Agricultural College
- Samstag Museum of Art
- South Australian School of Art
- Barr Smith Library
- On Dit
