= List of nationally significant 20th-century architecture in South Australia =

This is a list of nationally significant 20th-century architecture in South Australia. The buildings listed here appear in the publication "Nationally significant 20th century buildings in South Australia".

Building	Date	Address	Suburb	Architect/Architectural Practice	Notes
1st Turner Wood Project Home	1969		Bellevue Heights	John Chappell	
Adelaide High School	1951	West Terrace	Adelaide	E Fitzgerald & J Brogan (NSW)	
Adelaide Stock Exchange Building	1901	Exchange Place	Adelaide	Fuller & Dunn	Now houses the Conservation Council of South Australia
Adelaide Superdrome	1993		Gepps Cross	Carlo Gnezda; SACON	Awarded the 2017 Jack Cheesman Award for Enduring Architecture
All Soul's Church	1920		St Peters		
AMP Building	1934	King Wm St	Adelaide	Louis Laybourne Smith / Woods, Bagot, Laybourne Smith & Irwin	
Apartments	1992		Kensington	Raffen Maron	
Savings Bank of South Australia	1930	65 Woodville Road	Woodville		Now owned by City of Charles Sturt, used for youth services
Savings Bank of South Australia head office (now BankSA)	1943	King William Street	Adelaide	Eric McMichael / E.H. McMichael & Harris	
Barr Smith Library	1932	University of Adelaide	Adelaide	Woods Bagot	
Bicentennial Conservatory	1988	Adelaide Botanic Garden	Adelaide	Guy Maron / Raffen Maron Architects	Awarded the 2014 Jack Cheesman Award for Enduring Architecture
Bonython Hall	1936	North Terrace	Adelaide	Waltor Bagot / Woods, Bagot, Laybourne Smith & Irwin	
Bragg Laboratories	1960	University of Adelaide	Adelaide	Hassell & McConnell	part of the Physics Department, now renamed 'Darling West'
Burnside Town Hall	1926–7	Portrush Road	Tusmore	George Gavin Lawson / Chas Rutt & Lawson	Superseded by Burnside Ballroom (1950), but still in use as rehearsal room, hire
Capri Theatre	1930	Goodwood Road	Goodwood		
Carclew	1901	Jeffcott Street	North Adelaide	Bruce J Quinton	
Centennial Park, Jubilee Chapel, Centennial Park Cemetery	1987	Goodwood Road	Pasadena	Geof Nairn / Geof Nairn Architects	Awarded the 2024 Jack Cheesman Award for Enduring Architecture
Central Market Lift	1999		Adelaide	Tectvs Architects	
City of Holdfast Bay Council Chambers	1930	Jetty Road	Brighton	Chris Smith	Former Brighton Town Hall
City of Mitcham Council Chamber	1934	Belair Road	Torrens Park	D Berry	
Colonel Light Centre	1978		Adelaide	Hassell Architects	
Court House	1940		Whyalla	P R Claridge?	
David Jones Department Store	1963	Gawler Place	Adelaide	J McConnell / Hassell & McConnell	
Deepacres Apartments	1942	Melbourne Street	North Adelaide	Jack McConnell	
Dr Kents Paddock Housing	1983		Kent Town	Newell Platten / South Australian Housing Trust	Awarded the 2007 Jack Cheesman Award for Enduring Architecture
Eco Housing Co-op Inc	1999		Adelaide	Phillips & Pilkington	
Eden Park Residence	1901		Marryatville		
Elder House	1937		Adelaide	Walter Bagot	
Entry Pavilion, Soldiers Memorial Grounds	1922		Torrensville		
Epworth Building	1924	Pirie St	Adelaide	English & Soward	
Everard Court Apartments	1930		Keswick		
Flats 'Parkview'	1959		Adelaide	JS Chappel	
Flinders Major Communications Building	1990		Adelaide	Hassell	
Forensic Science Centre	1975	Divett Place	Adelaide	Colin Hocking / Department of Housing & Construction	Awarded the 2016 Jack Cheesman Award for Enduring Architecture
Freemasons Hall	1923	North Terrace	Adelaide	Bruce J Quinton & WH Harral	
Hampshire Hotel	1911		Adelaide	FK Milne	at Adelaide Central Market
Hardholt Building	1940		Port Adelaide	Philip Claridge / Claridge & Associates	
Hartley Building	1927	Kintore Avenue	Adelaide	George Gavin Lawson / Public Buildings Department	
Hindmarsh Incinerator	1935		Hindmarsh	Walter Burley Griffin / Walter Burley Griffin & Eric Nicholls	
Hotel Bay View	1940		Whyalla	Philip Claridge & Associates ??	
Immanuel College Chapel	1970		Novar Gardens	Eric Von Schramek / Von Schramek & Dawes	
Info Science, Tech, Eng Buildings	1992	Flinders University	Bedford Park	Woods Bagot	
IPEC Building	1962		Frewville	Peter Muller	
Jam Factory	1991		Adelaide	Steve Grieve	
Kathleen Lumley College	1966		North Adelaide	Dickson & Platten	
Maughan Church	1965	Franklin St	Adelaide	Eric Von Schramek / Brown & Davies, in Assoc. Eric Von Schramek	Named for Rev. James Maughan; Demolished in August 2016
Metropolitan Fire Station	1983	Wakefield St	Adelaide	Rod Roach / R Roach & Woodhead Australia	
MLC Building	1957		Adelaide	BSM, Lawson, Cheesman, Doley & PTRS	
Mt Gambier Fire Station	1955		Mt Gambier	Glover & Pointer	
Newland Memorial Church	1927		Victor Harbor	Woods, Bagot, Jory & Laybourne Smith	
Norwood Morialta High School	1972		Rostrevor	Peter Hooper / Public Buildings Department	
Nunyara Chapel	1962		Belair	Cheesman, Doley, Brabham & Neighbour	
Nurney Residence	1930		North Adelaide	Walter Bagot (Alterations)	
Office Building	1965		Adelaide	Hassell & McConnell	
Offices	1991		Adelaide	Hassell Architects	
Old Penola Estate	1970		Penola	Geoffrey Woodfall (VIC)	
Penfolds Magill Estate Restaurant	1996	Penfolds Rd	Magill	Keith Cottier / Allen, Jack & Cottier	
Power Station & Offices	1912		Adelaide		
Prince Alfred College Hall	1963	Dequetteville Tce	Kent Town	Hassell & McConnell	
Reserve Bank	1962	Victoria Square	Adelaide	Dept of Works & RA Jensen	
Residence	1912		Thorngate	FW Danker	
Residence	1920		Norwood	Jackman Gooden	
Residence	1930		Prospect		
Residence	1950		Leabrook		
Residence	1906		Kent Town	FW Danker	
Residence	1914		Toorak Gardens	FK Milne	
Residence	1963		Medindie	Peter Muller	
Residence	1940		Erindale	McConnell or Ellis?	
Residence	1949		Springfield	Russell Ellis	
Residence	1953		Burnside	Don Thompson / JS Chappel	
Residence	1955		Leabrook		
Residence	1956		Kensington Park	Alexandra Mokwinska	
Residence	1957		Marryatville	M Doley	
Residence	1957		Beaumont	Cheesman, Doley, Brabham & Neighbour	
Residence	1964		Norwood	Brian Polomka	
Residence	1975		Walkerville	Geof Nairn	
Residence	1990		College Park	Roger Myles	
Residence	1999		Malvern	Con Bastiras	
Residence - Marina	1998		North Haven	Nick Tridente / Tridente Architects	
Residence - SL 3	1970		Belair	Snowden & Pikusa	
Residence (Destree)	1964		Burnside	Robert Dickson	
Residence (Dickson)	1950		Rostrevor	Robert Dickson	
Residence (Lee)	1960		Brighton	Dickson & Platten	
Residence (Neighbour)	1958		Torrens Park	Keith Neighbour	
Roche	1905		North Adelaide	English & Soward	
Rostrevor College - Resource Centre	1998		Rostrevor	Nick Tridente / Tridente Architects	
Ruthven Mansions	1911	21 Pulteney St	Adelaide	Alfred Barham Black / Black & Fuller	Now called Mansions on Pulteney
SA Brewing Co Offices	1941		Adelaide	FK Milne & SH Gilbert	
SA Bureau of Meteorology	1970		Kent Town	Jim Ward / Dept of Housing & Construction	
Sands & MacDougall Store	1933	King Wm St	Adelaide	Claridge, Bruer & Fisher	
Scammell Residence	1930		Beaumont	George Gavin Lawson	
Science, Art, Technology Centre, St Peter's College	1998		College Park	Geof Nairn	
St David's Church	1960	Glynburn Road	Burnside		
St Georges Anglican Church	1902		Goodwood	Thomas Henry Lyon	
St Raphael's Church	1916	Young Street	Parkside		
St Theodore's Church	1914	Prescott Terrace	Toorak Gardens		
Stag Hotel	1903	Rundle Street	Adelaide	Garlick & Jackman	
State Bank	1955		Adelaide		
Thebarton Incinerator	1935		Thebarton	Walter Burley Griffin	
Thebarton Theatre / Town Hall	1928	Henley Beach Rd	Torrensville	Karberry & Chard	
Townhouses	1966		North Adelaide	Dickson & Platten	
Townhouses	1973		North Adelaide	Hannaford, Pellew & Hodgkinson	
Tubemakers Admin Building No 1	1938		Kilburn		
Tubemakers Admin Building No 2	1930		Kilburn		
Union Hall	1950	University of Adelaide	Adelaide	Louis Laybourne Smith / Woods, Bagot, Jory and Laybourne-Smith	Demolished in November 2010
Union House, Adelaide University Union	1975		University of Adelaide	Robert Dickson; Dickson & Platten	Awarded the 2005 Jack Cheesman Award for Enduring Architecture
Walkley House	1956	26 Palmer Place	North Adelaide	Robin Boyd (Melb)	Private residence, only house in South Australia designed by Robin Boyd
Walter Hughes Duncan Homes	1908	Alexandra Ave	Toorak Gardens		
(National) War Memorial	1931	North Terrace	Adelaide	Louis Laybourne Smith / Woods, Bagot, Jory and Laybourne-Smith	
West Torrens Library	1964		Hilton	Keal & Jury	
Westminster School Performing Arts	1989		Marion	Hassell Architects	
Westpac Bank	1938		Adelaide	PR Claridge / Claridge & Associates	
West's Coffee Palace	1903	110 Hindley Street	Adelaide	AS & FH Conrad	
Woodlands' Apartments	1930		North Adelaide		
Workmen's Cottages (Elder)	1902	Rose Street	Mile End	E Davies & Rutt	
YMCA	1950	Flinders St	Adelaide		

== See also ==
- List of historic houses in South Australia
