= Gulf Bridge International =

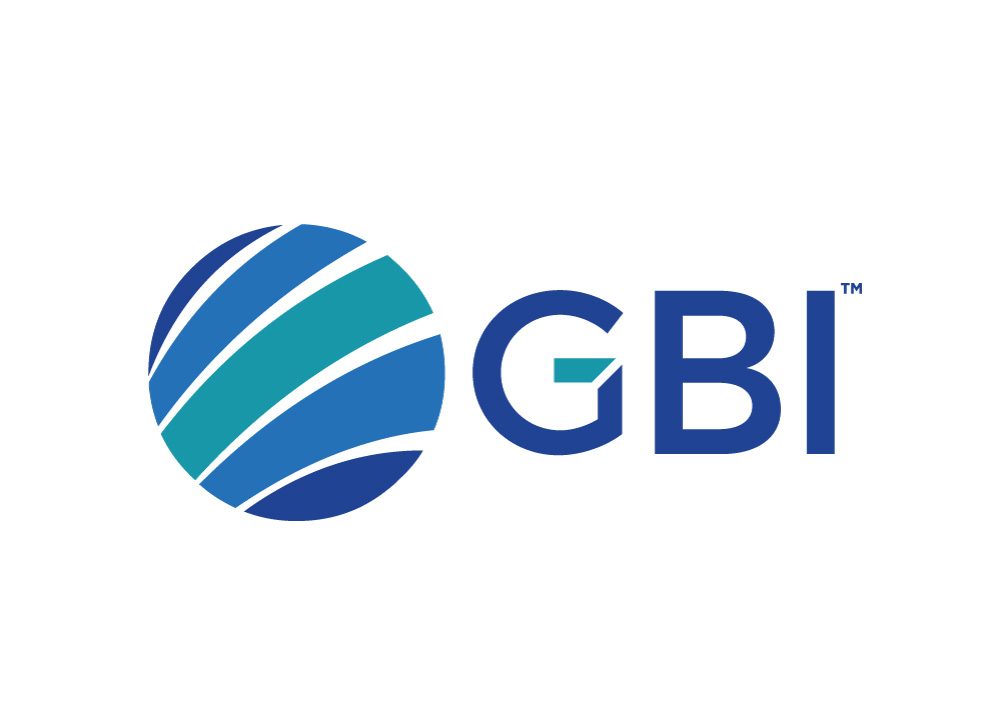
- Company type: Private
- Industry: Telecommunications
- Founded: 2008
- Headquarters: Level 2, Qatar Science & Technology Park Tech 1, Doha, Qatar
- Area served: Middle East, Europe & Asia
- Key people: Cengiz Oztelcan (Chief Executive Officer)
- Services: Submarine Cable Operator
- Website: www.gbiinc.com

Gulf Bridge International (GBI) is the Middle East's first privately owned submarine cable system linking the countries bordering the Persian Gulf on a self-healing ring to each other and onward to Europe, Africa and Asia. Gulf Bridge International (GBI) both owns and operates this submarine cable asset as a carrier's carrier as well as offering a full suite of wholesale transmission, IP capacity options, and Enterprise Services. Its main headquarters are located at the Qatar Science & Technology Park in Doha, Qatar.

The Gulf Bridge International Smart Network is an international carrier-grade fibre-optic network that spans more than 40,000 kilometres (25,000 mi). It includes a mix of submarine cable systems and terrestrial infrastructure, with investments in 9 major subsea cable systems with 9 points-of-presence (PoPs) and 17 cable landings between London and Singapore. It offers scalable bandwidth options up to 100G with a design capacity of up to five terabits per second.

== History ==
Incorporated in December 2008, GBI started production and deployment of the 'Gulf Ring' – a "high speed, subsea cable system" connecting the countries overlooking on Persian Gulf together and integrated into the larger GBI Cable System (GBICS) which has onward East and West links to Europe, Africa and Asia. The high capacity demand from the Middle East and lack of diversity/resilience (as witnessed by the cable outages of 2008) were large driving factors for the establishment of GBI.

=== 2019–present ===
In June 2019, Gulf Bridge International partnered with Nokia to deliver multi-national SDWAN in the Middle East with Nuage Networks.

In November 2019, GBI and Batelco strengthened their partnership to deliver accelerated connectivity between Bahrain and Europe.

In November 2019, GBI and Microsoft signed a Memorandum of Understanding (MoU) that supported cloud adoption in the Middle Eastern Region.

In January 2021, GBI participated in the launch of Qatar's first Internet Exchange Point.

In June 2021, GBI expanded its Versa Networks partnership by joining the Versa ACE Partner Program.

In August 2021, GBI together with Equinix enhanced the connectivity via Oman data centre.

== Market growth ==
Between 2005 and 2010, the Middle East was the fastest growing region globally in terms of demand for bandwidth and capacity usage.

The access to high-quality, reliable connectivity is critical for fostering economic development as supports the development of data centre industries, facilitates improvements in mobile and fixed technology and increases data consumption, which in turn drive significant revenue. For example, according to a GSMA study,^{[1]} mobile technologies and services accounted for 5.7% of MENA's GDP in 2019, or US$244 billion. The mobile industry in MENA also supported almost a million jobs (directly and indirectly) and contributed to the funding of the public sector, with almost US$20 billion raised through taxation in 2019.

== Geography ==
Since its establishment, the business has been validated, both by the participation of new regional investors and telecom operators looking for a new business model and the infrastructure to enable them to provide new applications and services.

GBI currently has a presence in:

- Qatar
- United Arab Emirates – Dubai and Fujairah
- Iran
- Iraq – This was a major first by GBI, as it placed the first ever submarine cable connecting Iraq to the world.
- Kuwait
- Bahrain
- Oman
- Saudi Arabia
- Italy – Milan
- India – Mumbai and Chennai
- Singapore
- United Kingdom – London
- France – Marseille and Paris
- Germany – Frankfurt
- Netherlands – Amsterdam

== Awards ==
- 2012 Best Niche/New Player - Capacity Europe
- 2012 Best Technology Investment - CommsMEA
