= Walter Bagot (architect) =

South Australian architect

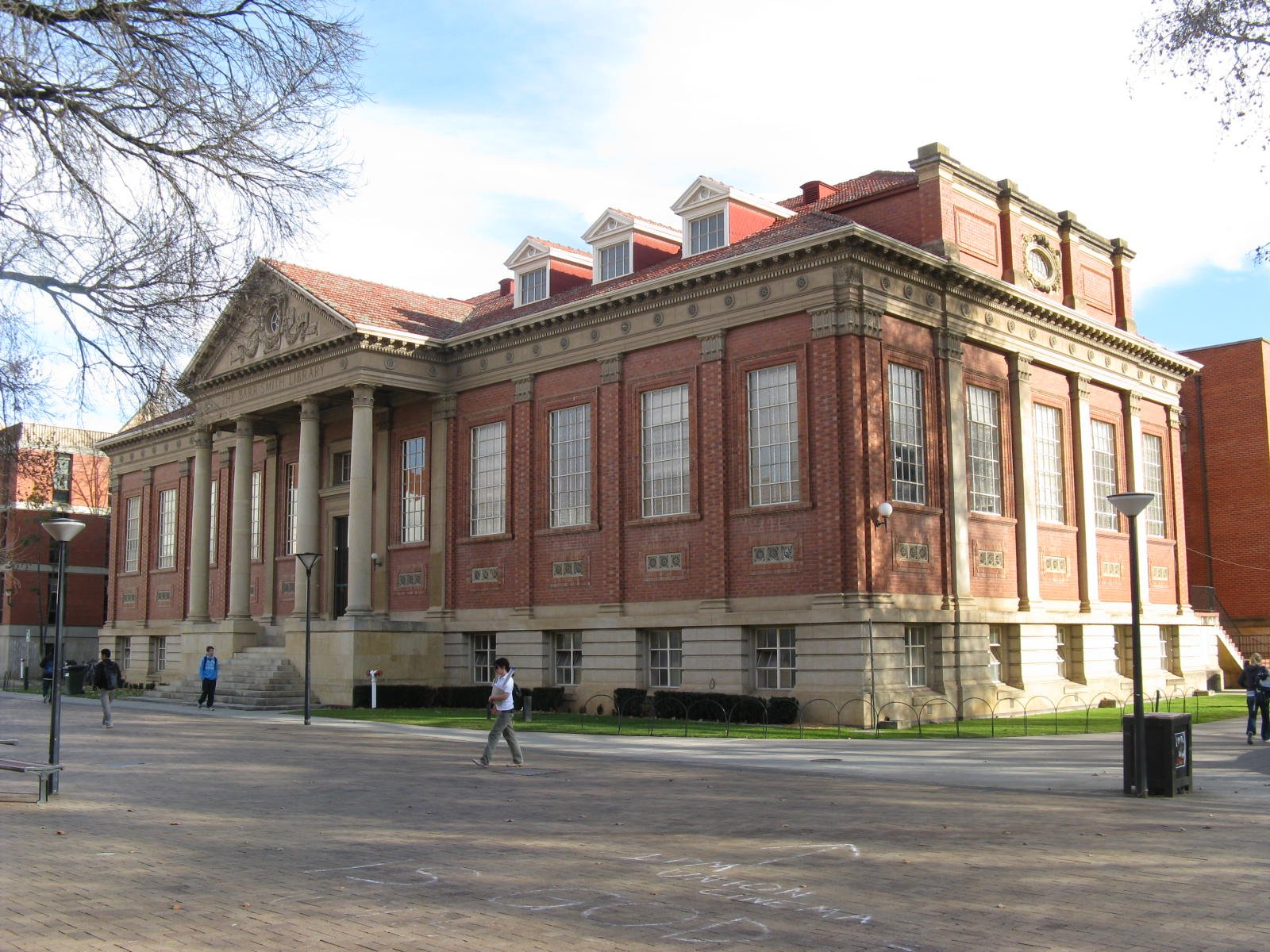
Barr Smith Library

Walter Hervey Bagot (17 March 1880 – 27 July 1963) was a South Australian architect. He was one of the last great proponents of the traditional school of South Australian architecture. He founded Woods & Bagot in 1905.

== Early life and education ==
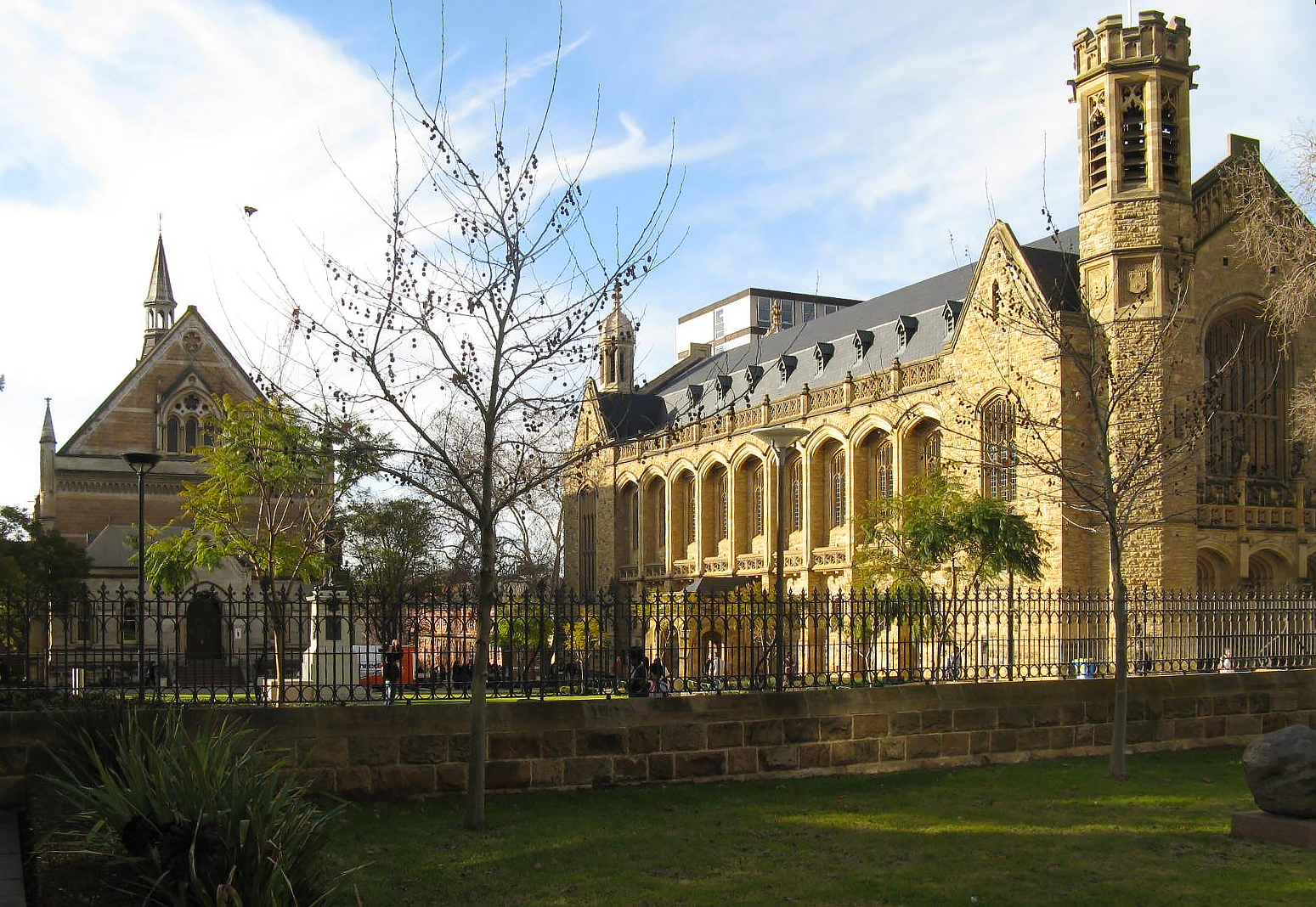
Bonython Hall

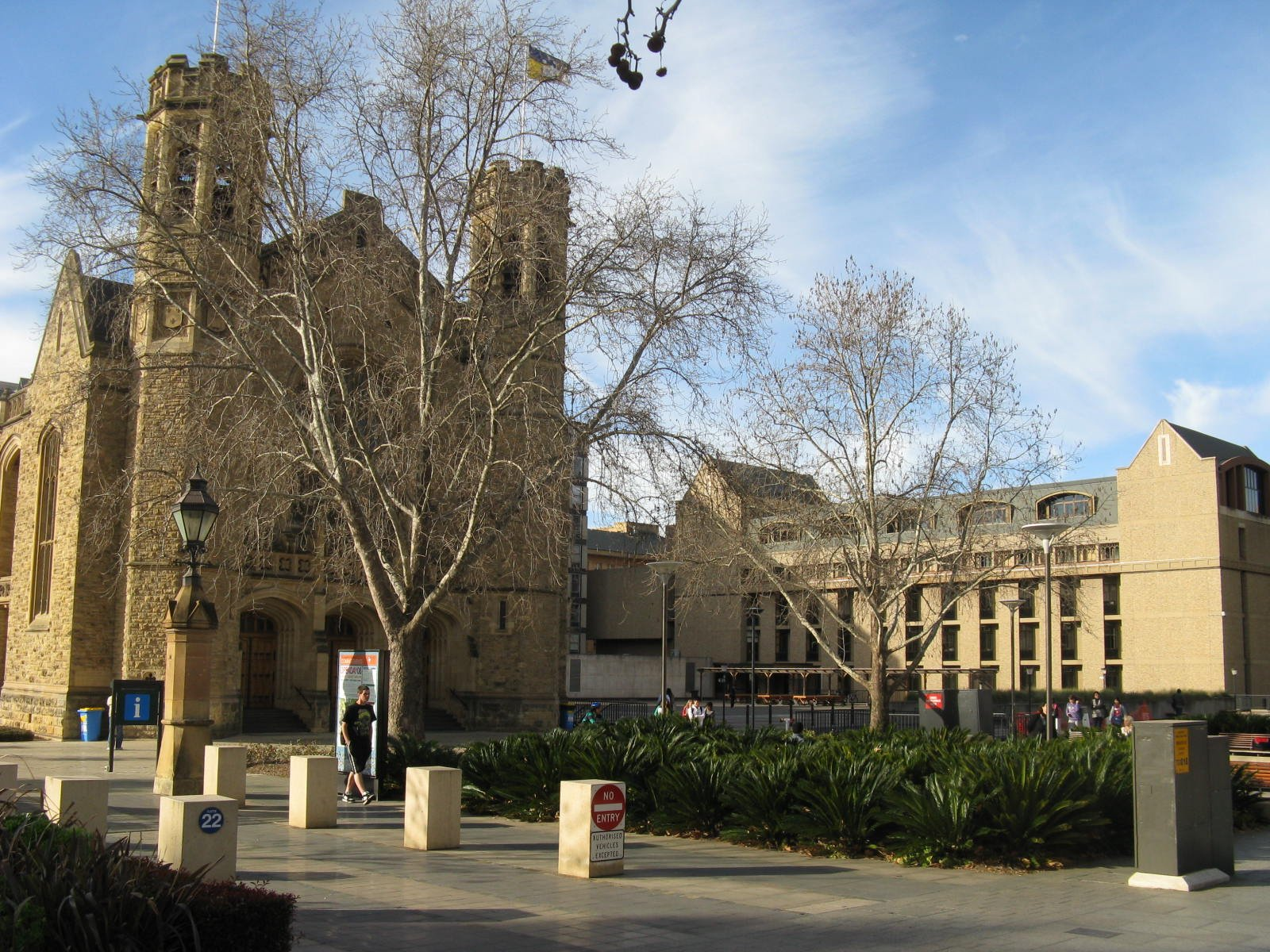
Bonython Hall

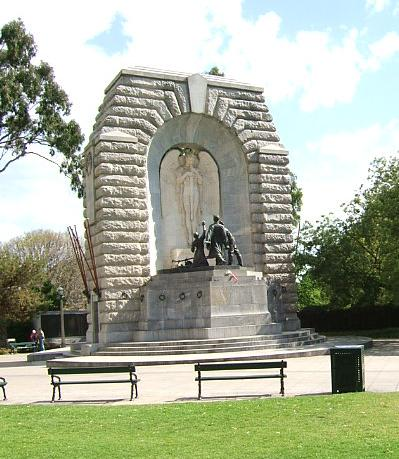

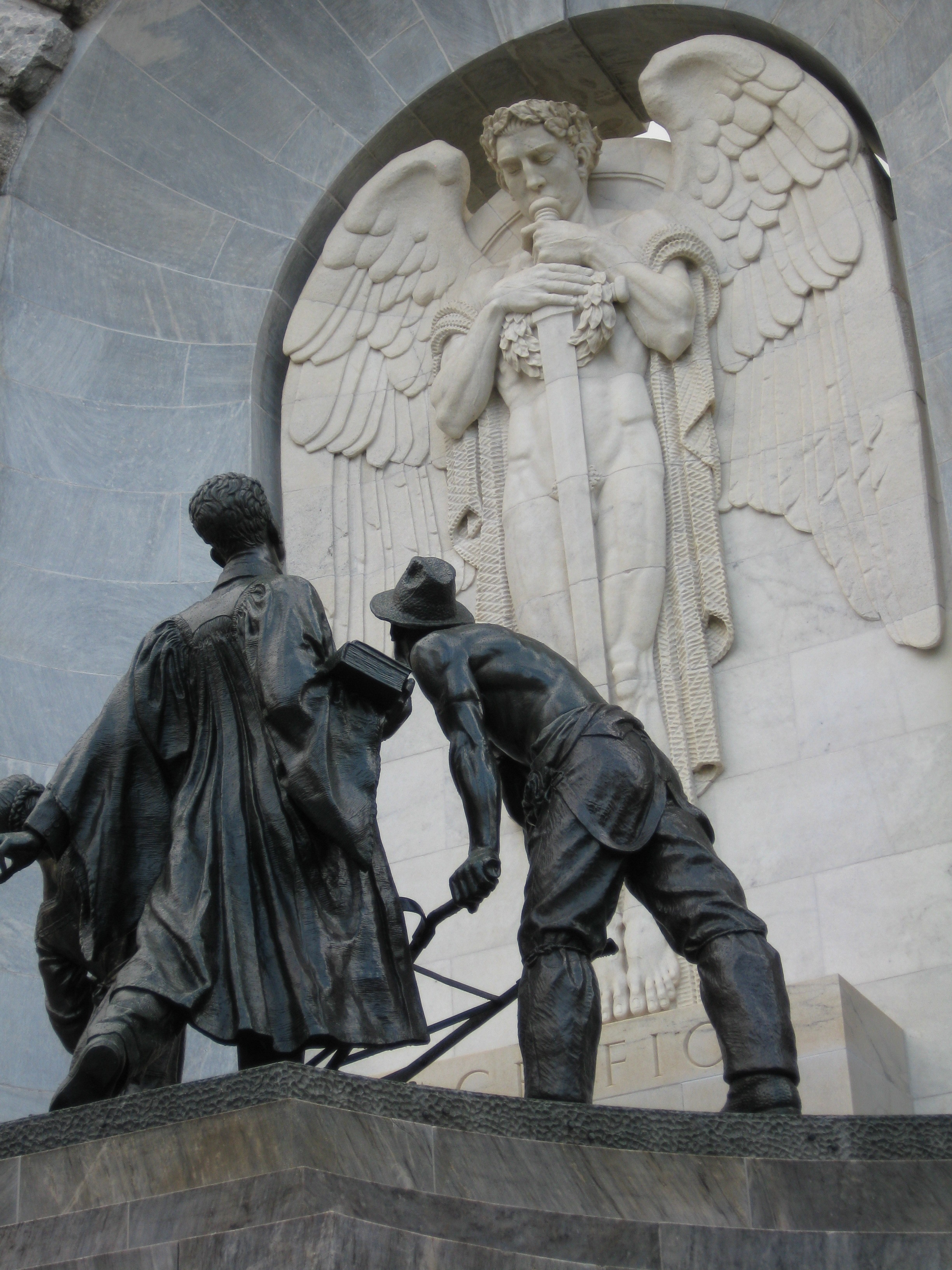

Bagot was born in North Adelaide, the son of pastoralist John Bagot MHA, and Lucy Josephine Ayers; his grandfathers were Charles Hervey Bagot and Sir Henry Ayers He was educated at the Collegiate School of St Peter.

After serving an apprenticeship with the architect Edward John Woods in Adelaide for four years, in 1902 Bagot went to England where he studied architecture at King's College London. He won the silver medal of the Worshipful Company of Carpenters, and in 1904 was admitted as an associate member of the Royal Institute of British Architects.

== Career ==
Bagot returned to Adelaide in 1905, and was taken into partnership with Woods, forming Woods & Bagot. The practice grew to include other prominent architects as members over time, including Louis Laybourne-Smith in 1917, Herbert Jory in 1915, and James Campbell Irwin in 1932.

Bagot preferred classical architecture and despised Modernism. He was appointed architect for the Roman Catholic Archdiocese of Adelaide in 1905, and architect in charge of St Peter's Cathedral in 1907, remaining in that position until 1945. He was architect for the University of Adelaide from 1910 until 1945.

=== Selected works ===
Bagot's work includes:

- Chapel of the Convent of Mercy (1920)
- Additions to St Francis Xavier's Cathedral (1922)
- War Memorial (1924 design destroyed by fire; contributed to final design built 1931.)
- Waite Institute Building (1927)
- Elder Smith & Co. Ltd (1929)
- Union Buildings (1929 and 1937)
- Barr Smith Library (1932)
- Bonython Hall (1936)

== Family and personal life ==
Woods bought the McMinn-designed Waterhouse House on North Terrace in 1906, selling it in 1926.

On 18 November 1908 at St Peter's Cathedral, Adelaide, he married Josephine Margaret Barritt (1889 – 7 June 1946), a granddaughter of Joseph Barritt. They lived at "Forest Lodge", a house near Aldgate built by Bagot's father, John Bagot. The couple had three children, one being John Hervey Bagot (1910–2008), a prominent lawyer.
