= Bonython Hall =

Great hall in Adelaide, South Australia

- Bonython Hall in 2026
- Interactive map of the Bonython Hall area

General information
- Type: Great hall
- Architectural style: Gothic Revival
- Location: North Terrace, Adelaide, South Australia, Australia
- Coordinates: 34.920548°S 138.605396°E
- Named for: Langdon Bonython
- Year built: 1933–1936
- Opened: 8 September 1936
- Renovated: 2005
- Owner: Adelaide University

Design and construction
- Architect: Walter Bagot
- Architecture firm: Woods, Bagot, Laybourne-Smith & Irwin

Website
- adelaide.edu.au

South Australian Heritage Register
- Official name: Bonython Hall, The University of Adelaide
- Designated: 24 July 1980
- Reference no.: 10878

Bonython Hall is a Gothic Revival great hall at Adelaide University on North Terrace, Adelaide, facing Pulteney Street.

Bonython Hall was proposed in 1920 after South Australian architect Louis Laybourne Smith and newspaper proprietor Langdon Bonython visited the University of Sydney. Bonython proposed a Gothic hall for the University of Adelaide. The project proceeded in 1930 after Bonython donated A£40,000, later increased to £50,000, and architect Walter Bagot was appointed to design the building. Disagreement over the proposed site centred on its potential impact on the planned extension of Pulteney Street, but the University Council retained the North Terrace location.

Bonython laid the foundation stone on 4 December 1933, and construction was completed in 1936. The hall was inaugurated on 8 September 1936 by Governor-General Alexander Hore-Ruthven, with about 1,400 people attending. Its first lecture was delivered by Winifred Cullis on 15 September 1936, and the building subsequently became a venue for university ceremonies, examinations, lectures and public events. Bonython Hall was added to the Register of the National Estate in 1978 and the South Australian Heritage Register in 1980. Conservation work undertaken from 2005 restored and upgraded the building while retaining its heritage features. Following the formation of Adelaide University in 2026, the final graduation ceremonies at Bonython Hall were held in March.

== History ==
=== Development and planning (1920–1930) ===
The idea of constructing a great hall at the University of Adelaide originated in 1920 following a visit to the University of Sydney by South Australian architect Louis Laybourne Smith and Langdon Bonython, owner of The Advertiser. Bonython proposed a hall modelled on the great hall at Sydney University as an architectural landmark for the University of Adelaide. He favoured a Gothic architecture influenced by the historic universities of England and wanted the building prominently positioned on North Terrace, facing Pulteney Street.

The project proceeded in 1930 when Bonython donated A£40,000 to the university. Walter Bagot of Woods, Bagot, Laybourne-Smith & Irwin was appointed architect. Bagot's initial design was relatively modest, but Bonython advocated a larger Gothic Medieval design. The completed design combined the medieval architectural style with modern construction methods.

The proposed location on North Terrace became the subject of debate in the media and Adelaide City Council. Several councillors objected because the building would prevent the extension of Pulteney Street northwards to Frome Road, an alignment associated with William Light's plan for Adelaide. Supporters of the road extension argued that it would provide a connection to the northern suburbs and help accommodate future traffic, while opponents of the hall's location warned that its construction could contribute to traffic problems. An alternative site at Jubilee Oval was proposed. The University Council rejected the alternative because a road through the university would divide the campus and create noise near the Barr Smith Library. The issue did not reach the attention of any state parliamentarian. Bonython had also contributed £100,000 towards the completion of the second half of Parliament House in the 1930s.

=== Construction and opening (1933–1936) ===
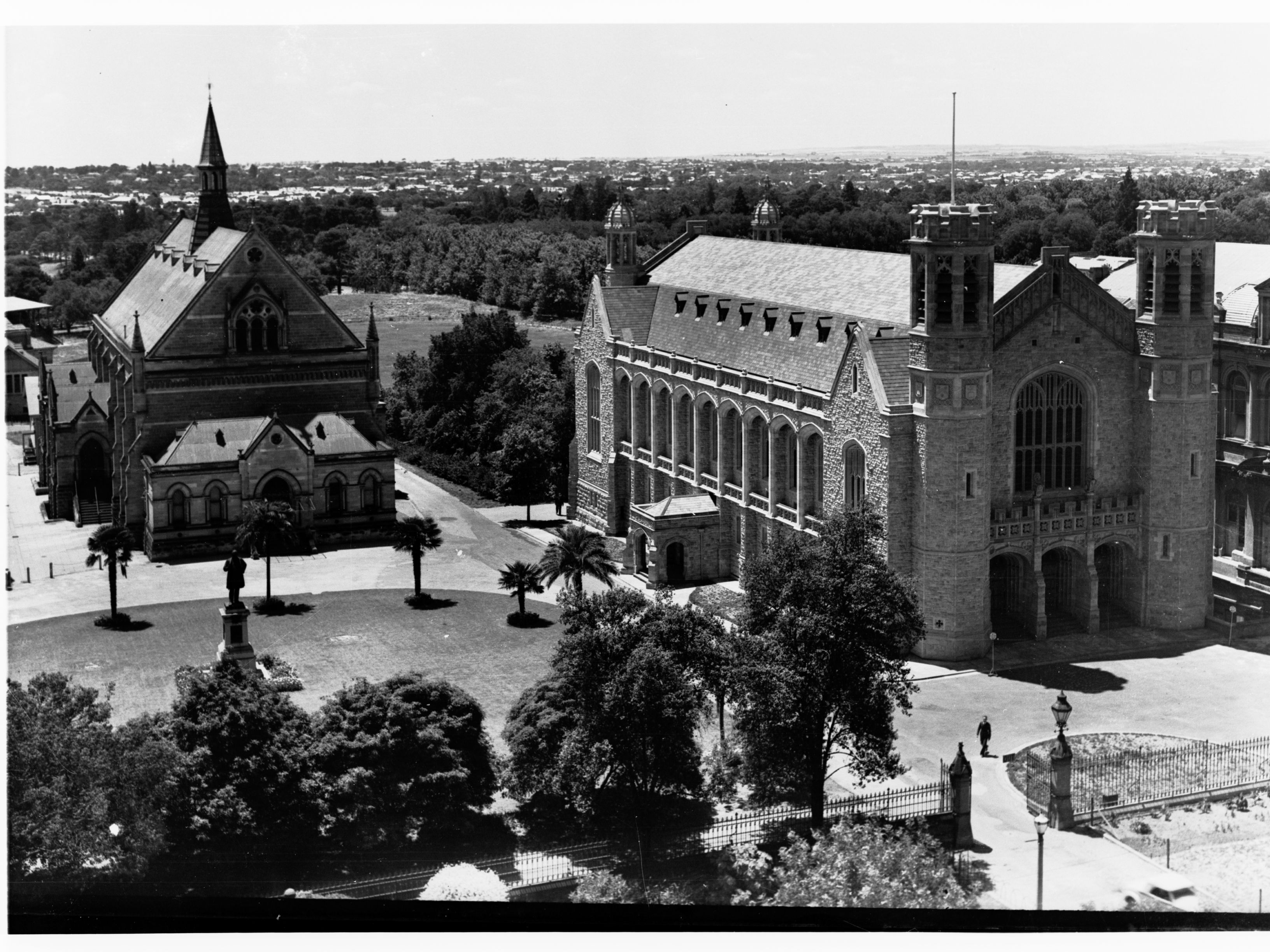
Elder Hall (left) and Bonython Hall (right), c. 1935

Langdon Bonython laid the foundation stone of Bonython Hall on 4 December 1933 in the presence of dignitaries, politicians and university officials. Vice-Chancellor William Mitchell said the hall was intended to serve the wider community as well as the university and would function as an assembly hall for meetings, degree ceremonies and examinations, while concerts would continue to be held in Elder Hall. The foundation stone was laid by Bonython using a silver trowel after a hermetically sealed glass container containing contemporary newspapers and university publications had been placed in a niche beneath it. Bonython later increased his contribution to £50,000 by 1934. Construction was completed in 1936, coinciding with the centenary of South Australia.

The building was inaugurated on 8 September 1936 by Governor-General Alexander Hore-Ruthven at a ceremony attended by about 1,400 invited guests, including students and members of the public. The ceremony was preceded by an academic procession from Elder Hall. On 15 September, Winifred Cullis, Professor of Physiology, delivered the first lecture in the hall, on nutrition. Bonython Hall subsequently hosted graduation ceremonies, examinations, exhibitions, lectures, conventions, mass meetings and other public events.

=== Later developments and uses (1978–present) ===
Bonython Hall was entered on the Register of the National Estate on 21 March 1978 as part of the historic places associated with the University of Adelaide's North Terrace campus. On 24 July 1980, the building was included in the South Australian Heritage Register. In 2002, a digital Makin pipe organ was installed in the hall, with the first recital performed by Sydney organist David Dury on 3 October. The organ was designed to reproduce the sound of a traditional pipe organ. The Register of the National Estate ceased to have statutory effect in 2007 and is now maintained on a non-statutory basis.

Conservation and renovation work began in 2005 as part of the University of Adelaide's wider conservation program for its heritage-listed buildings. The project addressed deterioration of the northern turrets and the need to improve heating and cooling, and included repairs and restoration to the turrets, air conditioning, earthquake strengthening, building services and audio-visual facilities. Investigations undertaken during the work identified the original materials used in the turrets, including hard Murray Bridge freestone and pressed cement synthetic stonework for decorative elements and dressings. The work was completed without altering the building's heritage features and received a UNESCO Asia-Pacific Heritage Awards Award of Merit for cultural heritage conservation in 2007. It was the only Australian project among the award recipients that year.

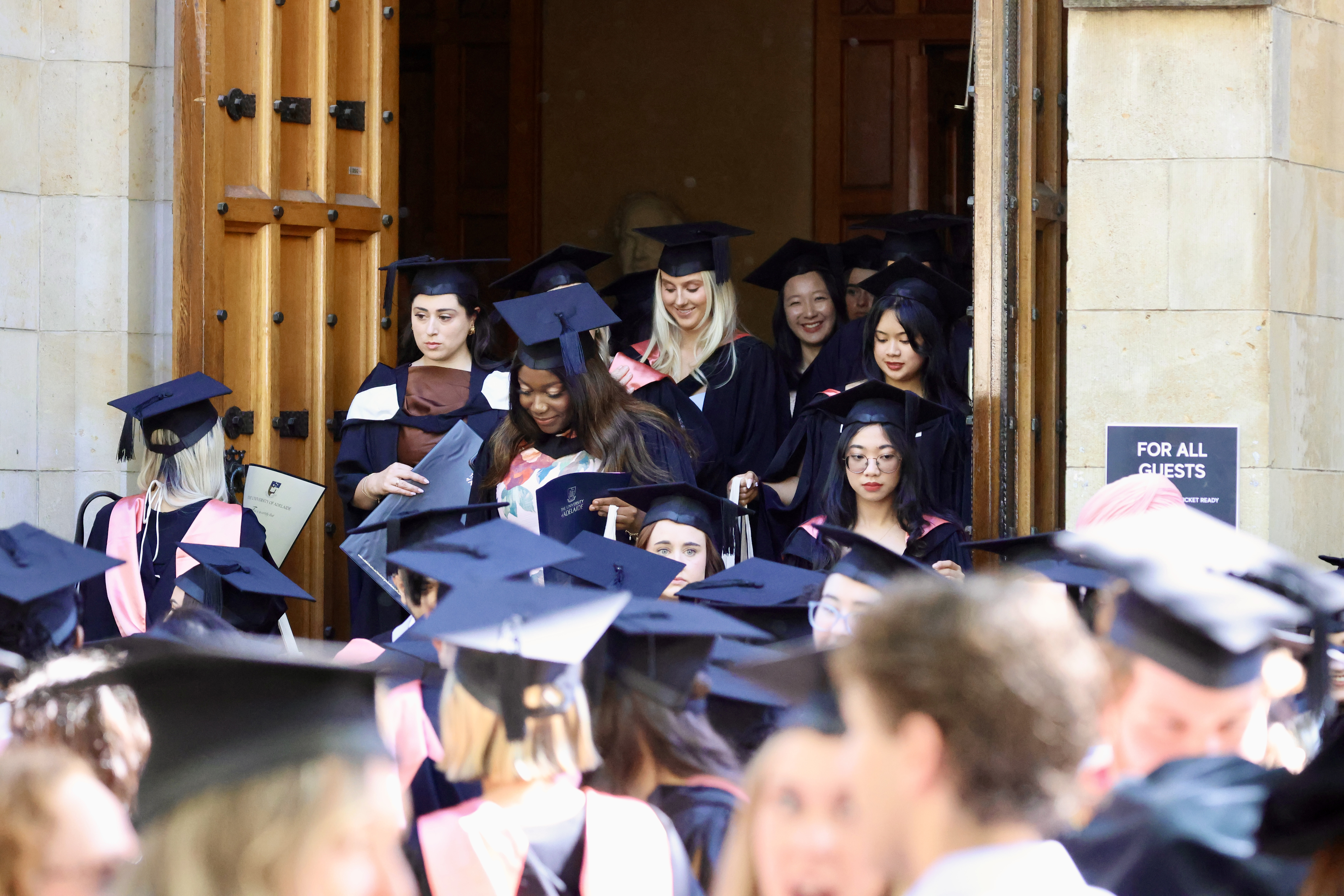
The final graduation ceremonies held at Bonython Hall, 23 March 2026

Following the merger of the University of Adelaide and the University of South Australia to form Adelaide University in 2026, graduation ceremonies were moved from Bonython Hall to Pridham Hall on the former City West campus. The final University of Adelaide graduation ceremony at Bonython Hall was held on 27 March, ending its use as the university's graduation venue since its opening. Adelaide University attributed the change to increased attendance and said it was considering incorporating Bonython Hall into future graduation events. Students subsequently petitioned for graduates of the former University of Adelaide to continue holding ceremonies at the hall.

== Design and features ==
Bonython Hall is a Gothic Revival building constructed principally of Murray Bridge limestone, with the stone surfaces finished to retain their natural texture. The roof is clad in slate from the Willunga quarries, while the roof structure incorporates steel trusses and the vaulting uses reinforced concrete. The building also incorporates acoustic and climatic considerations, including arcaded windows that reduce direct sunlight and heat entering the interior. Its exterior features spires, octagonal towers with battlement parapets, tracery and leadlight windows, and a lion figurine on the parapet. The grounds are enclosed by a rock-faced sandstone and cast-iron fence.

The interior includes jarrah and Queensland hoop pine flooring, together with oil-polished wainscoting, wall panelling and joinery made from Australian and Manchurian oak. The decorative ceiling features escutcheons bearing the coats of arms of the University of Adelaide and the Bonython family alternately. The foundation stone is Murray Bridge freestone. Portraits of former vice-chancellors, chancellors and other people associated with the university are displayed within the hall. The building is adjacent to the Goodman Crescent lawns. Its internal arrangement can accommodate lectures as well as dinners, banquets, cocktail functions, public lectures and seminars. Bonython was also reportedly responsible for the inclusion of a sloping floor, although the claim that it was intended to prevent ballroom dancing is regarded as a commonly repeated legend.

== Gallery ==
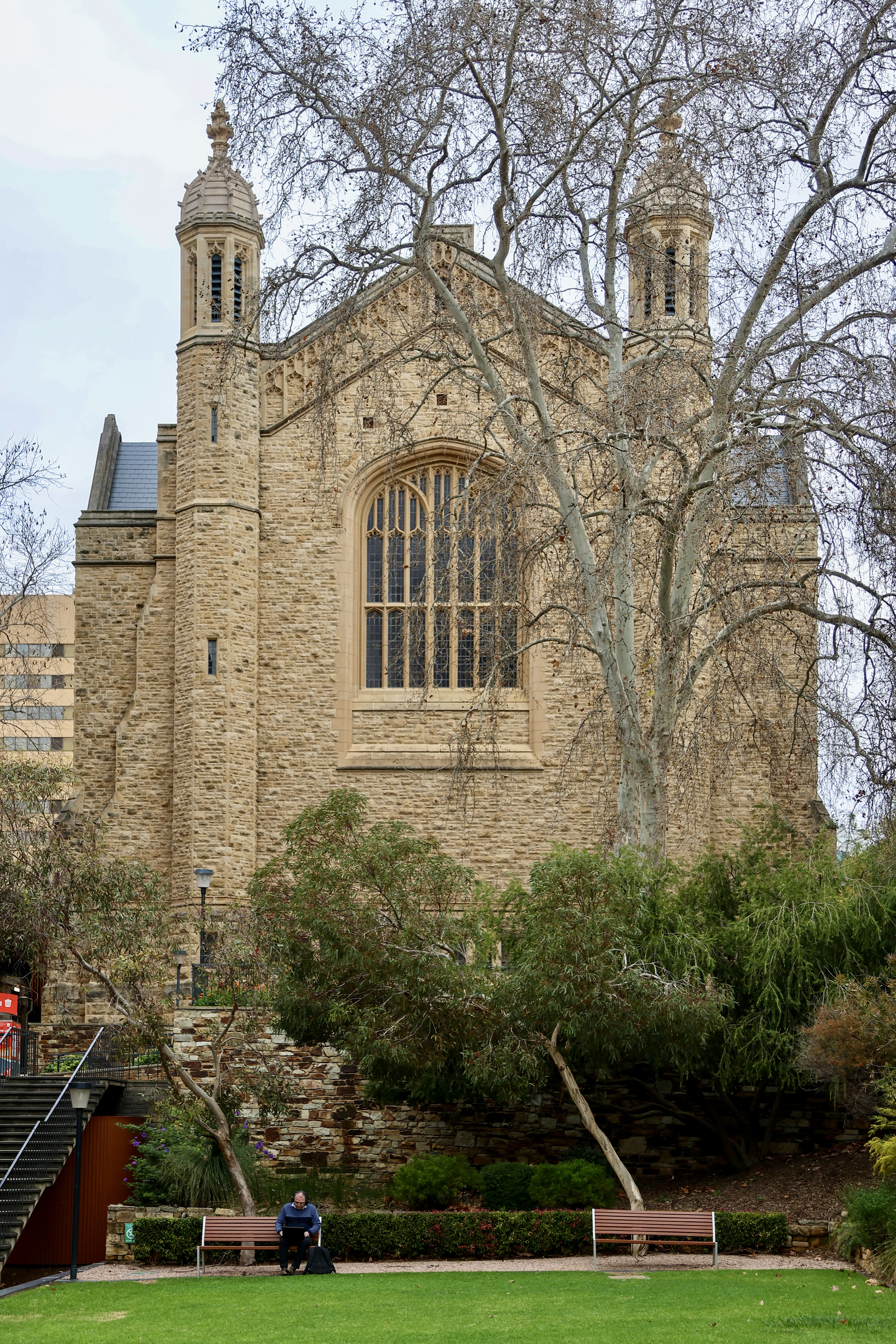
Rear of Bonython Hall, viewed from the Goodman Crescent lawns, 2008

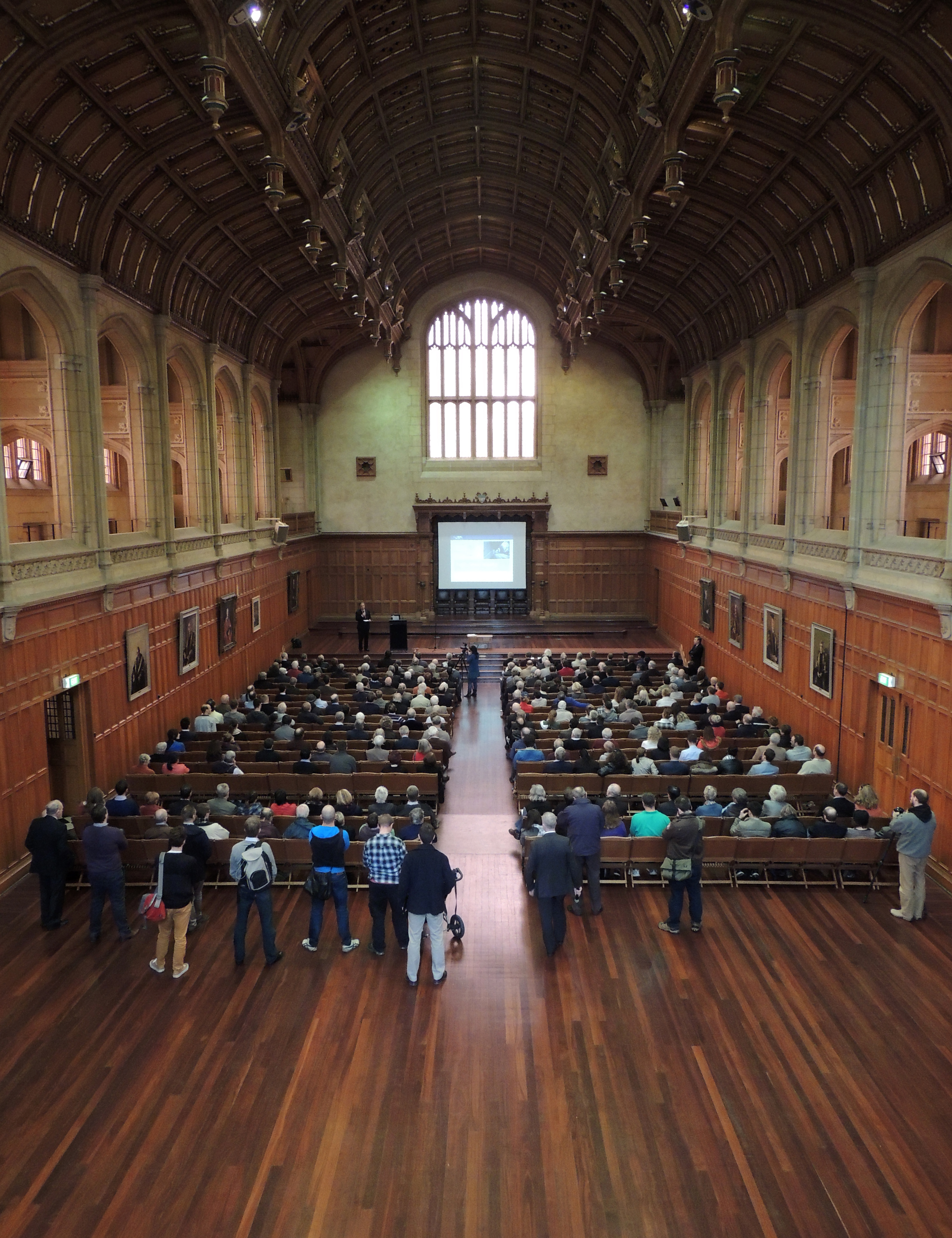
Interior of Bonython Hall during the Nuclear Fuel Cycle Royal Commission public forum, 2015

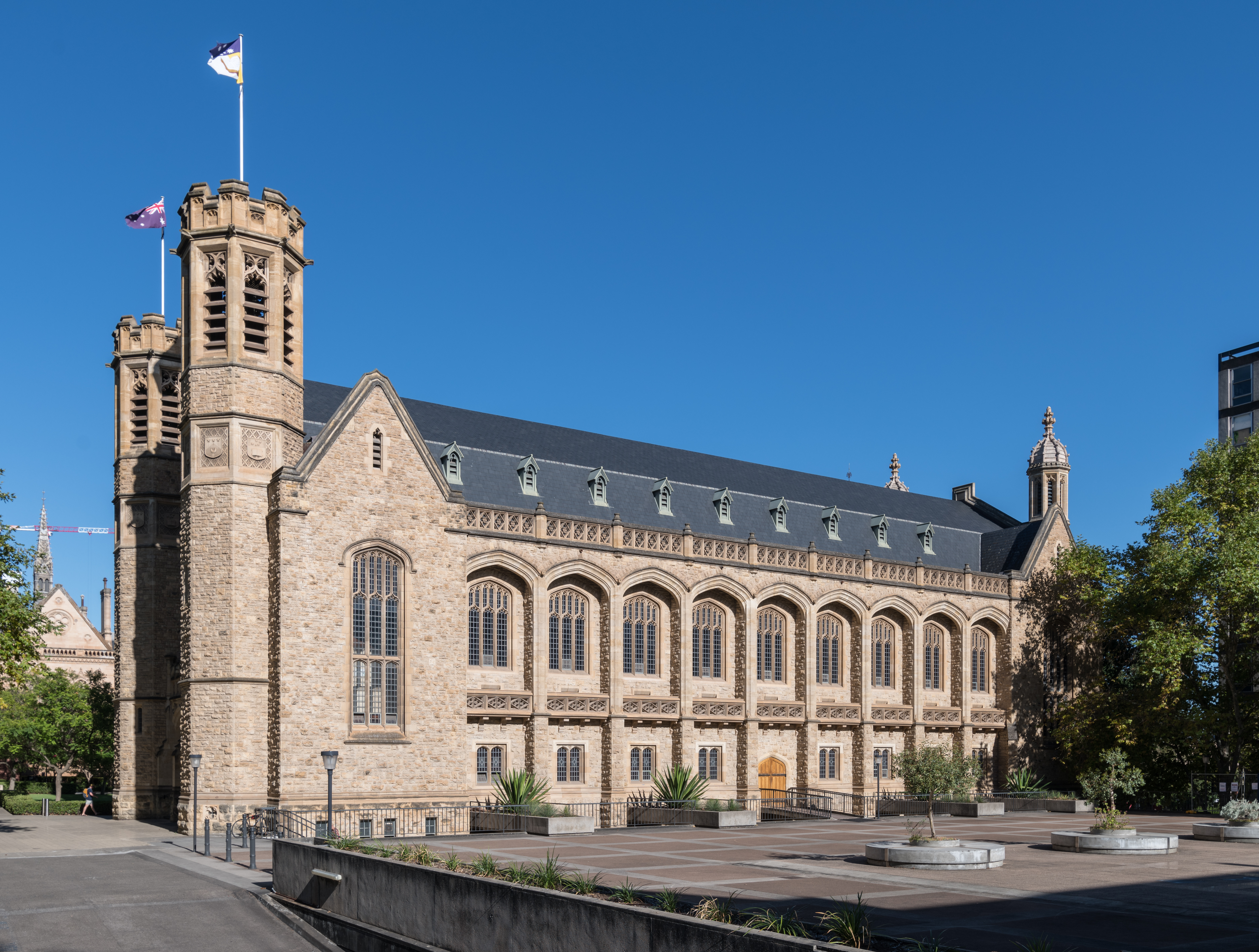
East view of Bonython Hall, viewed from the Colombo Plan Alumni Court, 2023

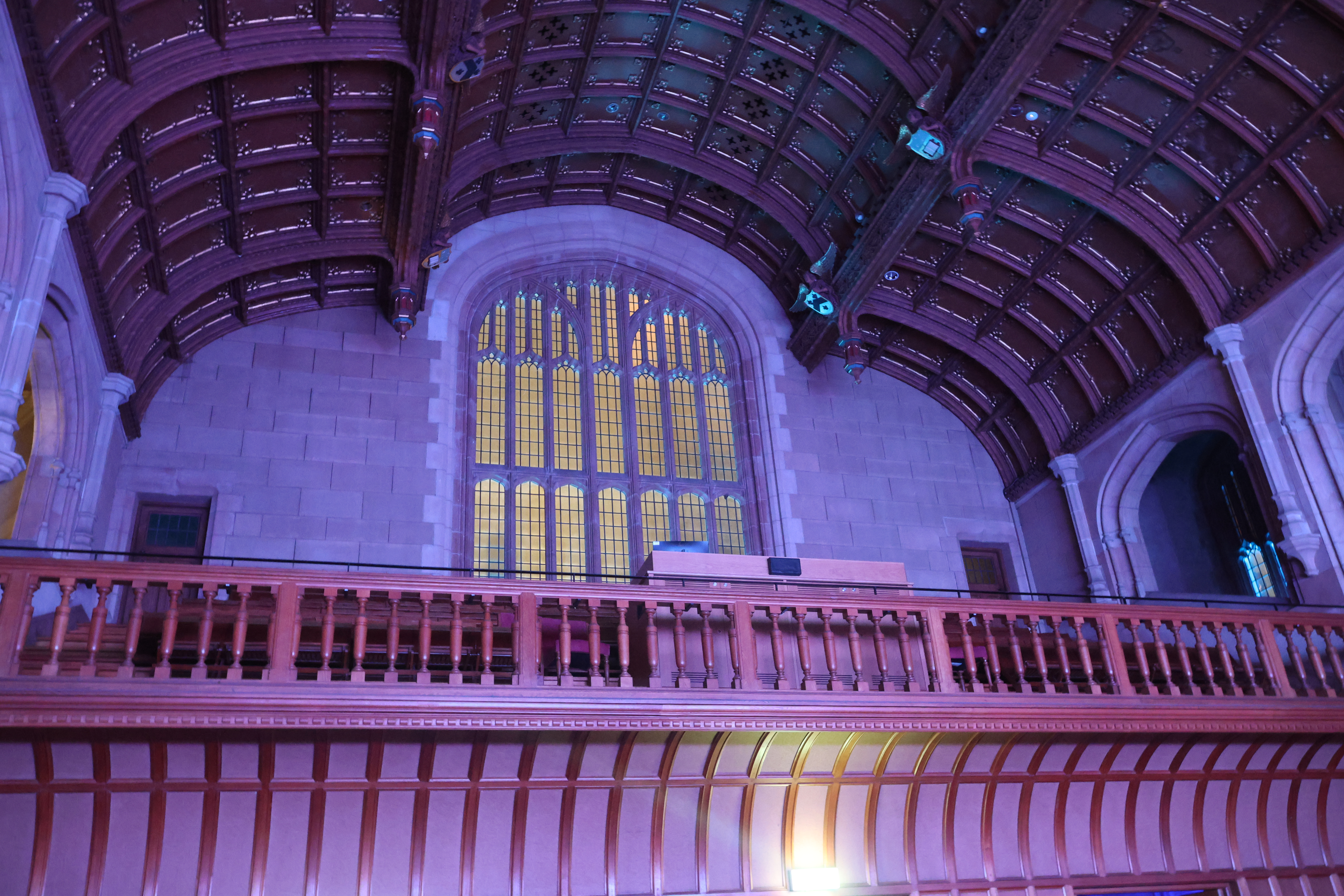
Viewing deck of Bonython Hall during Illuminate Adelaide, 2025

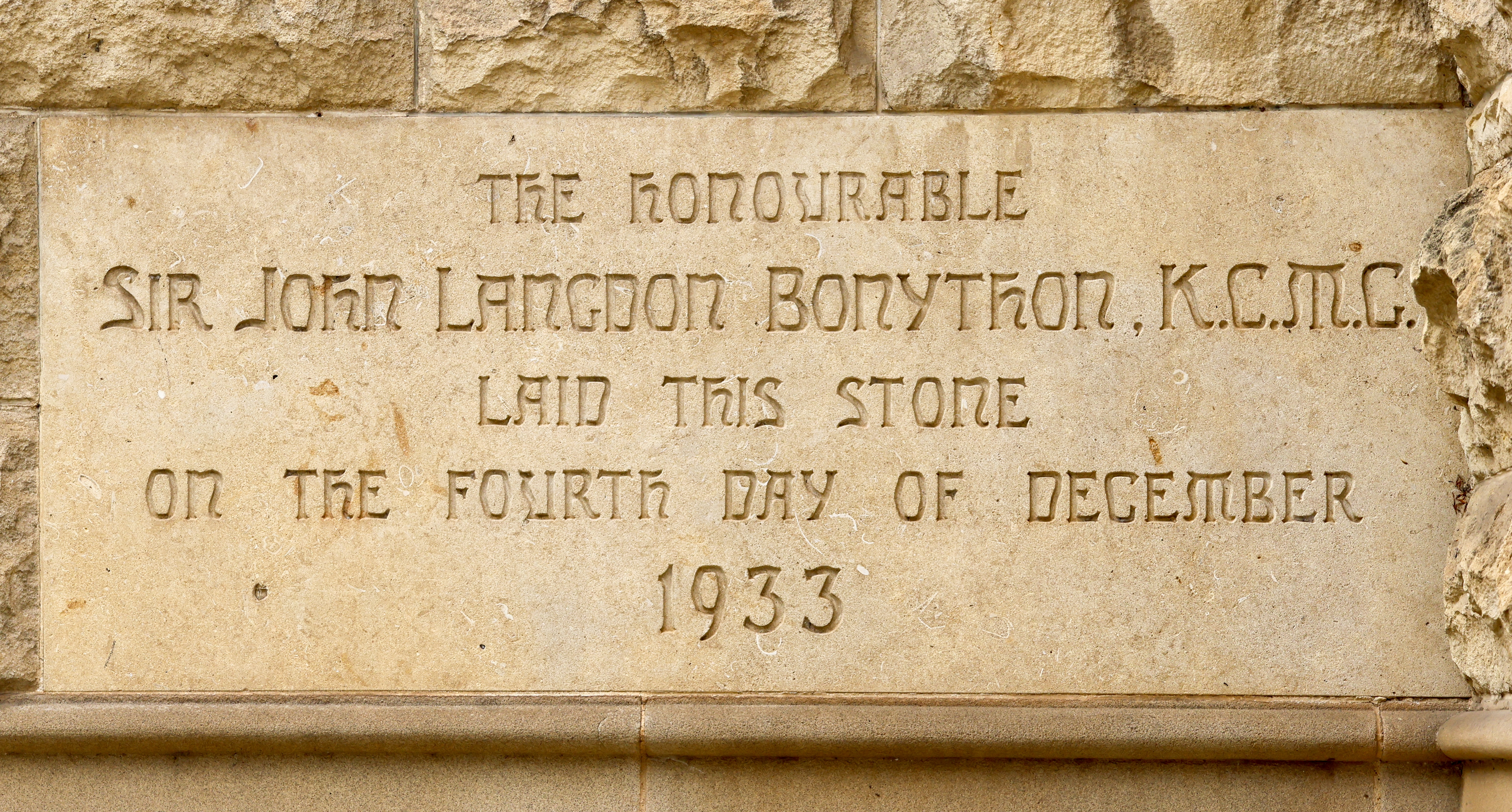
Foundation stone made from Murray Bridge freestone at Bonython Hall, 2026

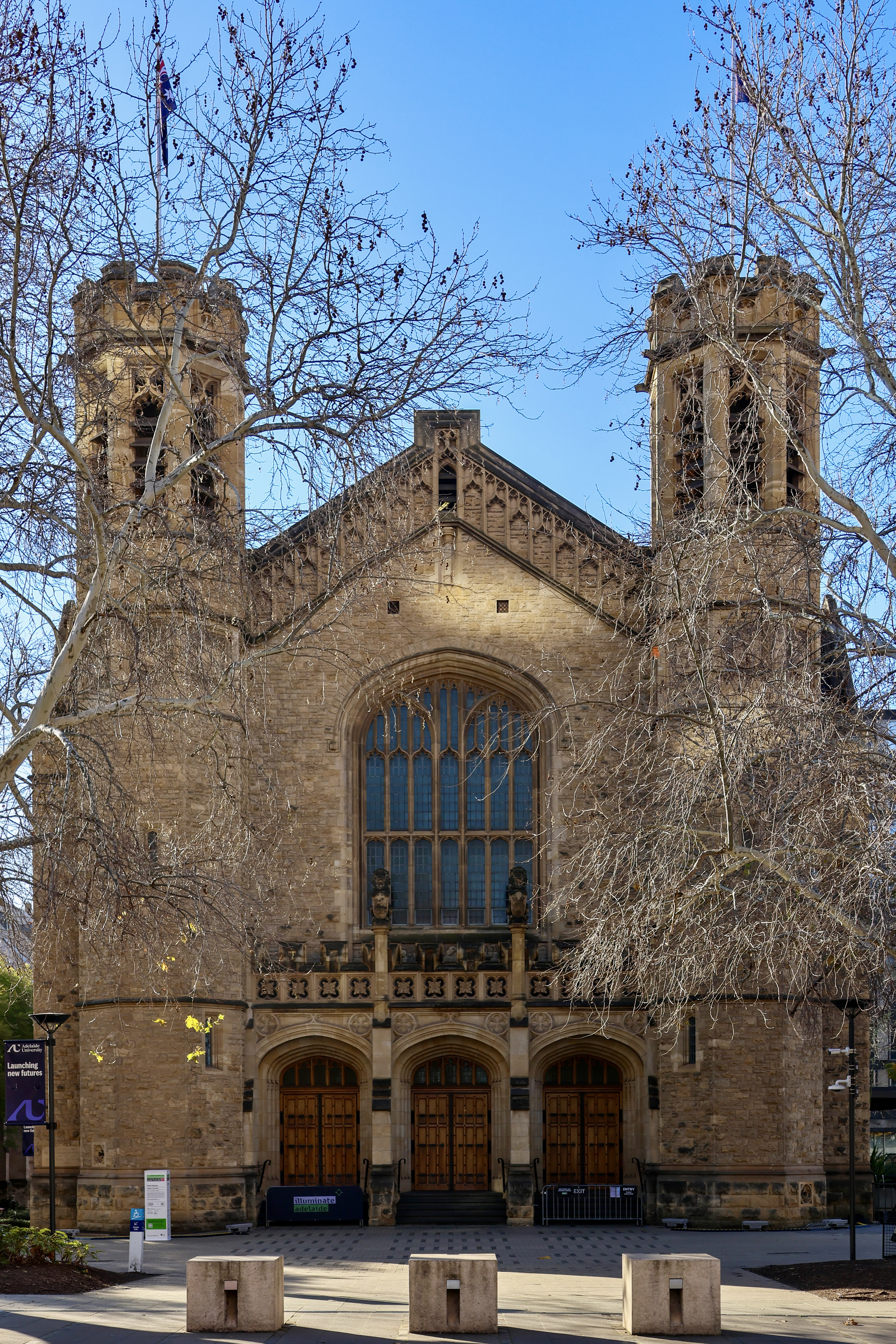
Front façade and entrance of Bonython Hall, 2026
