= South Australian Health and Medical Research Institute =

Research centre in Australia

- The northeast face of the SAHMRI building in May 2014
- Founders: Flinders University; University of Adelaide; University of South Australia
- Established: December 2009
- Focus: Medical research
- Executive Director: Professor Steve Wesselingh
- Faculty: Royal Adelaide Hospital
- Staff: approximately 700
- Key people: Steve Wesselingh
- Address: North Terrace
- Location: Adelaide, South Australia, Australia
- Coordinates: 34°55′17″S 138°35′23″E
- Interactive map of South Australian Health and Medical Research Institute
- Website: www.sahmri.org

The South Australian Health and Medical Research Institute (SAHMRI) is an independent health and medical research institute in Adelaide, South Australia. The institute is housed in a purpose-built eponymous building with its iconic "cheese-grater" design created by architects Woods Bagot, located in South Australia's health and biomedical precinct on North Terrace, just east of the Royal Adelaide Hospital.

The institute is composed of approximately 700 researchers, many of whom have links to, and work collaboratively with, other research institutes in Australia and overseas.

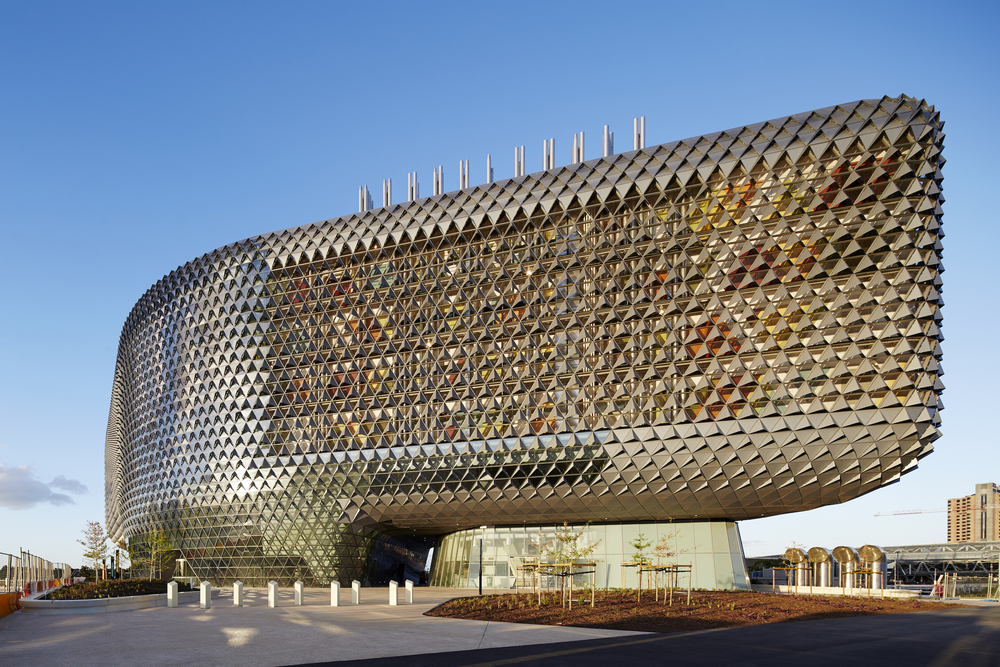
The southern face of the SAHMRI building in February 2014

The institute was officially incorporated in December 2009, and opened in its current location on 29 November 2013. A second building (SAHMRI 2) is under construction as of August 2022, and will house the Australian Bragg Centre for Proton Therapy & Research after its completion, scheduled in late 2023.

== Establishment ==
In 2007 the South Australian Government commissioned the Review of Health and Medical Research in South Australia. The review was conducted by Professor John Shine and Alan Young. In May 2008 the review recommended that the South Australian Government establish a new health and medical research institute, and a fund to finance the institute.

The South Australian Government committed to establish the institute, and the Australian Government provided A$200 million to help build the institute's building. The institute was incorporated in December 2009.

== Governance ==
SAHMRI is governed by a nine-person board which includes representatives of South Australia's three universities: Flinders University, the University of Adelaide and the University of South Australia. SAHMRI's inaugural executive director since 2011 is Professor Steve Wesselingh.

The institute was officially incorporated in December 2009.

== Researchers ==
The institute is composed of approximately 700 researchers, many of whom have links to, and work collaboratively with, other research institutes in Australia and overseas.

== Buildings ==
=== SAHMRI 1 ===
After nearly four years of construction, the institute opened in its new building on 29 November 2013. Woods Bagot, architects of the first SAHMRI building, with its iconic "cheese-grater" style, won several awards in the 2014 South Australian Architecture Awards, awarded by the Australian Institute of Architects. The firm received the Keith Neighbour Award for Commercial Architecture, the Robert Dickson Award for Interior Architecture, the Jack McConnell Award for Public Architecture, the Derrick Kendrick Award for Sustainable Architecture, and the Colorbond Award for Steel Architecture.

The building was mainly funded by the federal government (A$200 million), with the state government putting in A$85 million into the project, which would also go towards running costs.

=== SAHMRI 2 ===
Construction of the SAHMRI 2 building, which will house the Australian Bragg Centre for Proton Therapy & Research, starts in July 2020. This will be the first proton therapy unit in Australia, treating cancer patients with the advanced precision radiation treatment. The building is scheduled to be completed in 2023, with the first patients seen in 2025. Like the first building, SAHMRI 2 has also been designed by Woods Bagot. The federal government is providing A$68m and the state government A$47.4m towards the A$500m project, part of which will be spent on relocating the Train Control Centre to Dry Creek. The new building will be adjacent to the University of Adelaide's Health & Medical Science Building, opened in 2017, on its eastern side.

== Funding ==
The operational costs of running the institute have been funded by a combination of various government grants, mainly through the National Health and Medical Research Council (for example, a total of A$34,354,553 in 2017) and various other sources. The South Australian Health and Medical Research Institute Trust was registered as a charitable trust on 23 November 2015, and the Institute is supported by a variety of corporate sponsors, private philanthropists and philanthropic foundations. In December 2018, A$12m in grant funding was announced by the government to support research in Aboriginal health, infection and immunity, and cancer. In August 2019, additional funding of more than A$10.5 million over five years was announced by the NHMRC.

== See also ==
- Health in Australia
