= Woods Bagot =

Architecture firm

Practice information
- Founders: Edward John Woods; Walter Bagot
- Founded: 1869; Adelaide, South Australia
- Location: Abu Dhabi, Adelaide, Beijing, Brisbane, Auckland, Dubai, Hong Kong, London, Los Angeles, Melbourne, New York, Perth, Riyadh, San Francisco, Shanghai, Shenzhen, Singapore, Sydney

Significant works and honors
- Buildings: SAHMRI building, Adelaide; National Australia Bank, Melbourne Docklands; Qatar Science & Technology Park, Doha
- Awards: Architects Journal AJ100 International Practice of the Year Award 2009; AIA Award for International Architecture 2009

Website
- woodsbagot.com

Woods Bagot is a global architectural and consulting practice founded in Adelaide, South Australia. It specialises in the design and planning of buildings across a wide variety of sectors and disciplines. Former names of the practice include Woods & Bagot, Woods, Bagot & Jory; Woods, Bagot, Jory & Laybourne Smith; Woods, Bagot, Laybourne-Smith & Irwin; and Woods Bagot Architects Pty Ltd.

Founded in 1905, some of their most significant early work includes buildings at the University of Adelaide, including Bonython Hall and the Barr Smith Library. 21st-century projects include the Qatar Science & Technology Park, Melbourne Convention & Exhibition Centre and the SAHMRI building in Adelaide.

Woods Bagot is now established worldwide, with studios in five regions: Asia, Australia, Europe, the Middle East and North America. In 2015, the firm was named as the world's seventh largest architecture firm by employee count in Building Design magazine.

== History ==
Woods Bagot's origins date back to 1869, when architect Edward John Woods was commissioned to improve and expand the design of St. Peter's Cathedral in Adelaide. In 1905 he joined forces with another prominent local architect, Walter Bagot, and the pair created Woods & Bagot.

Woods retired from the practice known as Woods, Bagot & Jory on 30 June 1915, and Louis Laybourne-Smith became a partner in the practice, causing the practice to be renamed Woods, Bagot, Jory & Laybourne Smith. Woods died in January 1916. Jory left to practise on his own and the practice was dissolved on 30 September 1930, with James Campbell Irwin (later Lord Mayor of Adelaide) joining the practice, now called Woods, Bagot, Laybourne-Smith & Irwin. Irwin was a senior partner in the firm from 1965 until he retired in 1974.

A summary of the practice's early names:

- 1905—1913: Woods & Bagot
- 1913—1915: Woods, Bagot & Jory
- 1915—1930: Woods, Bagot, Jory & Laybourne-Smith
- 1930—1974: Woods, Bagot, Laybourne-Smith & Irwin

From 19 June 1974, the firm was registered firstly as Woods Bagot Architects Pty Ltd (until at least 1996), and subsequently as Woods Bagot Pty Ltd.

== Current practice ==
In 2015, the firm was named as the world's seventh largest architecture firm by employee count in Building Design magazine's World Architecture 100 list.

As of 2025, Woods Bagot has 18 offices globally including six in Australasia; Adelaide, Auckland, Melbourne, Sydney, Brisbane and Perth; Beijing, Hong Kong, Shanghai and Shenzhen in China; London; Abu Dhabi, Riyadh and Dubai in the Middle East; Los Angeles, New York and San Francisco in the USA; and Singapore.

== Architectural style ==
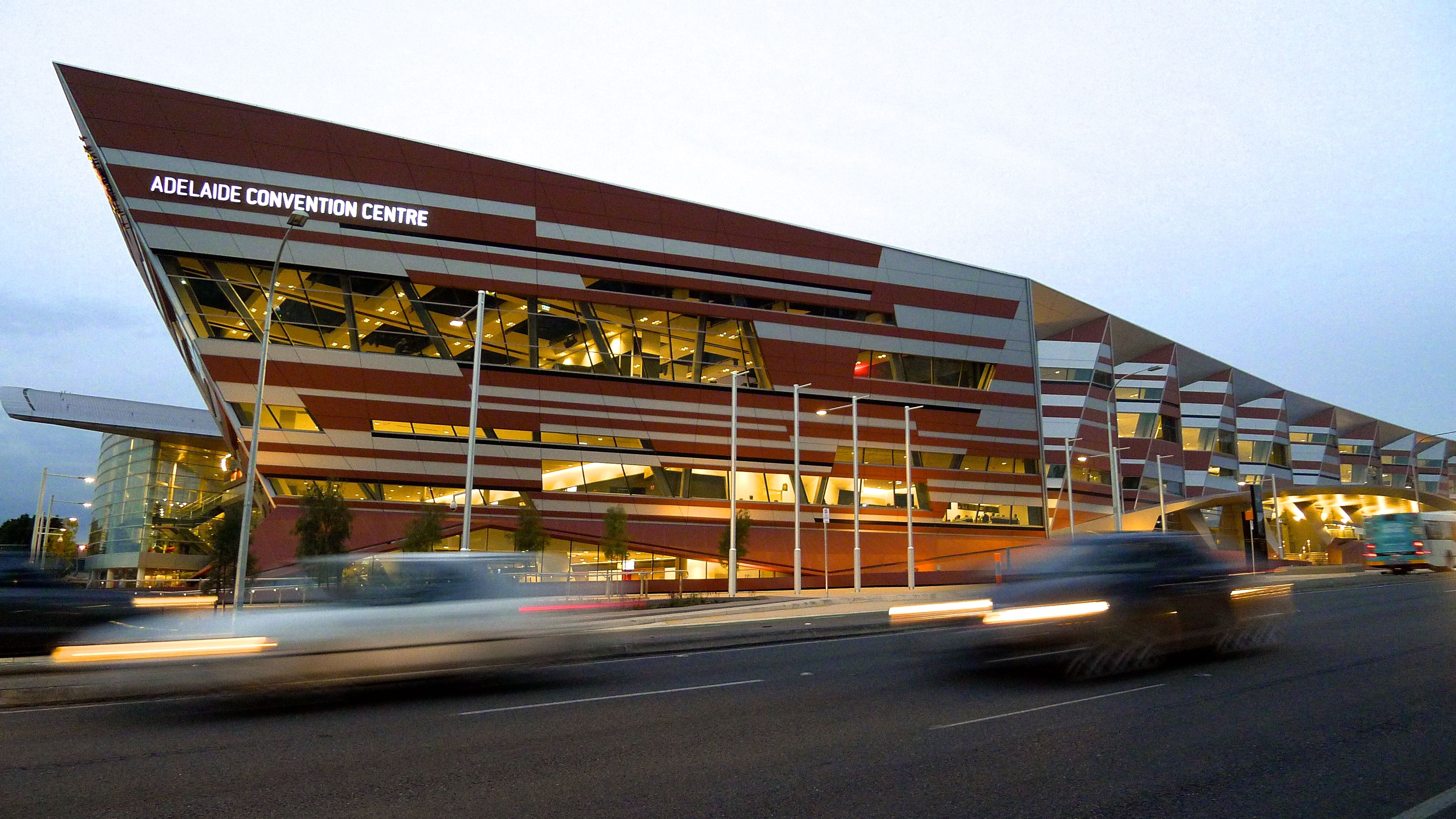
The design of the Adelaide Convention Centre's West Building echoes the local geology

Inevitably for a firm with whose history spans more than a century, Woods Bagot has embraced a wide variety of architectural styles since its inception. Early Australian buildings such as Bonython Hall were built in the classical Gothic style popular at the time, but the firm's steady expansion into Asia, Europe and North America was accompanied by a corresponding shift in style and approach that embraced a variety of modern and progressive themes.

The firm's latest work is often inspired by the natural world. The South Australian Health and Medical Research Institute (SAHMRI) building's exterior surface is inspired by a pine cone, for example, with a so-called 'living skin' designed for optimal passive solar performance. A new extension to the Adelaide Convention Centre, designed in association with American architect Larry Oltmanns, references local geological forms, in particular the distinctive colours and stratification of the South Australian landscape.

Some recent designs have focused on philosophical as well as environmental and geological themes. The design of the Nan Tien Institute in Wollongong, New South Wales, reflects Buddhist teaching principles, specifically avoiding hierarchical components and providing a neutral environment free of materialism and excess. A new bridge and plaza connecting the Institute to the nearby Nan Tien Temple complex has been designed as a practical, mixed-use focus point for community gatherings, as well as a notable development in its own right. Outside Australia, the Cubism-inspired Cubus, a 25-storey retail tower completed in Hong Kong in 2011, is equipped with geometric lighting panels that emulate the shapes and forms of ice cubes.

== Accolades ==
Woods Bagot was named as the 2009 Architects' Journal AJ100 International Practice of the Year.

== Notable projects ==
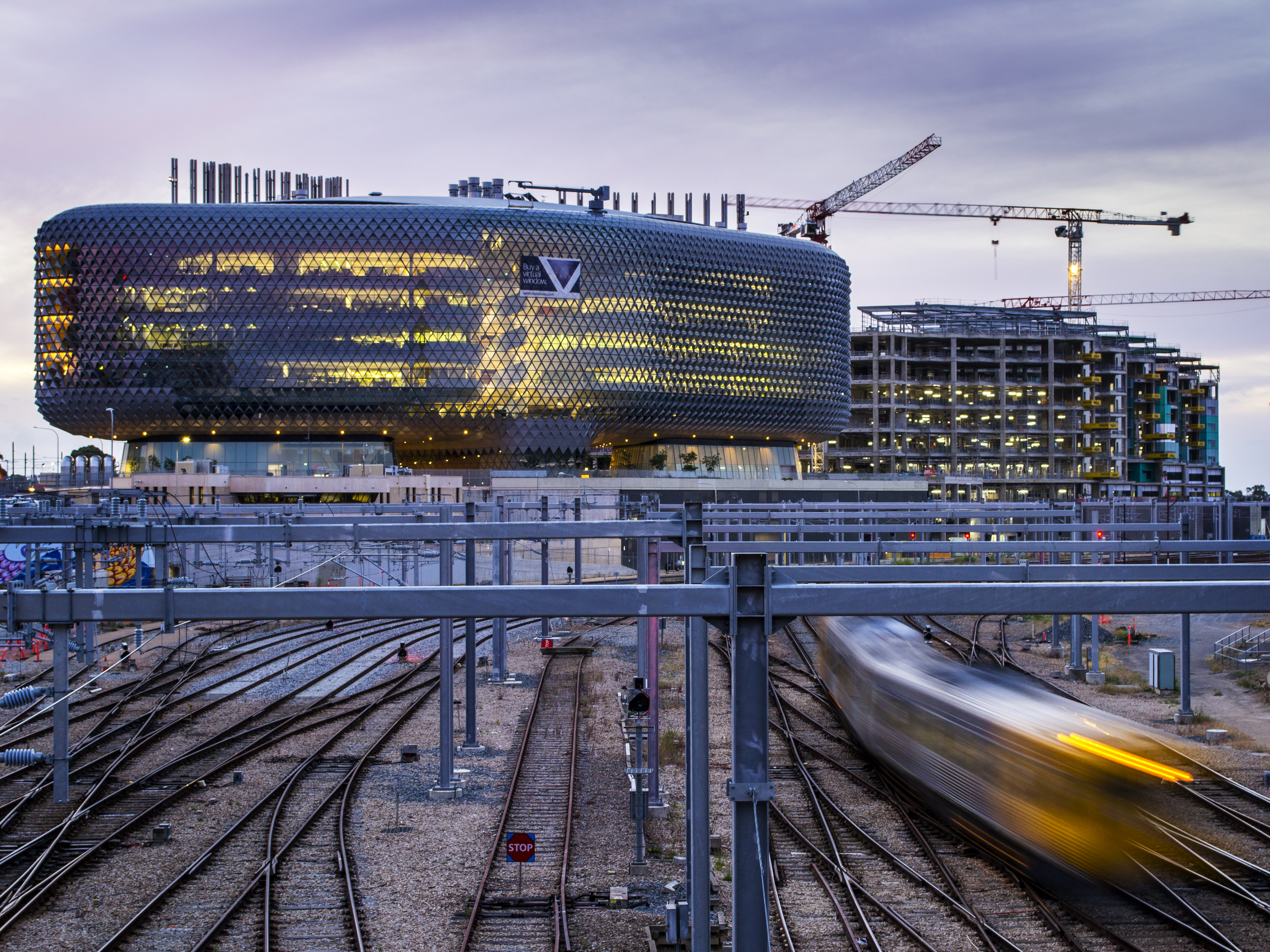
SAHMRI building, Adelaide

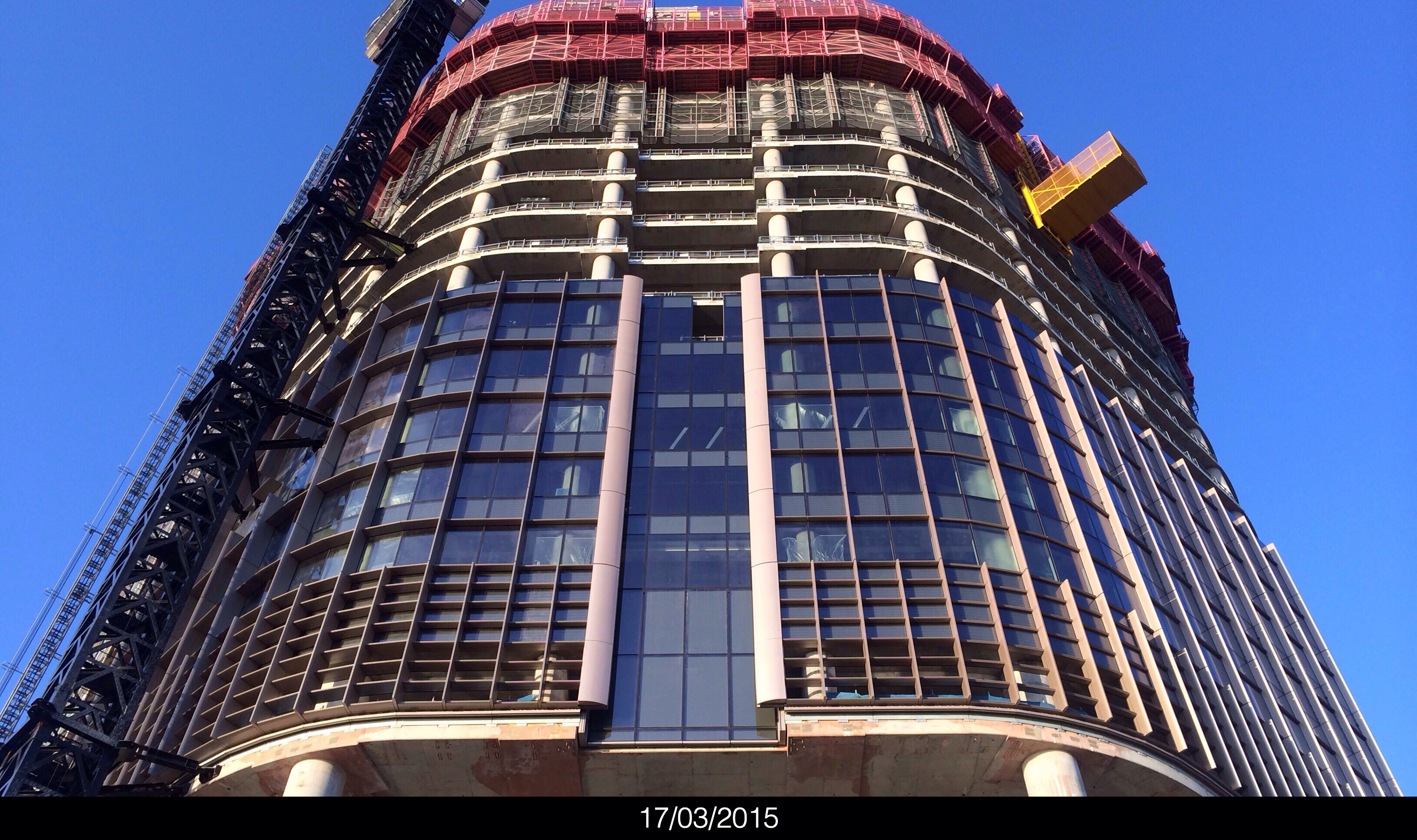
1 William Street, Brisbane

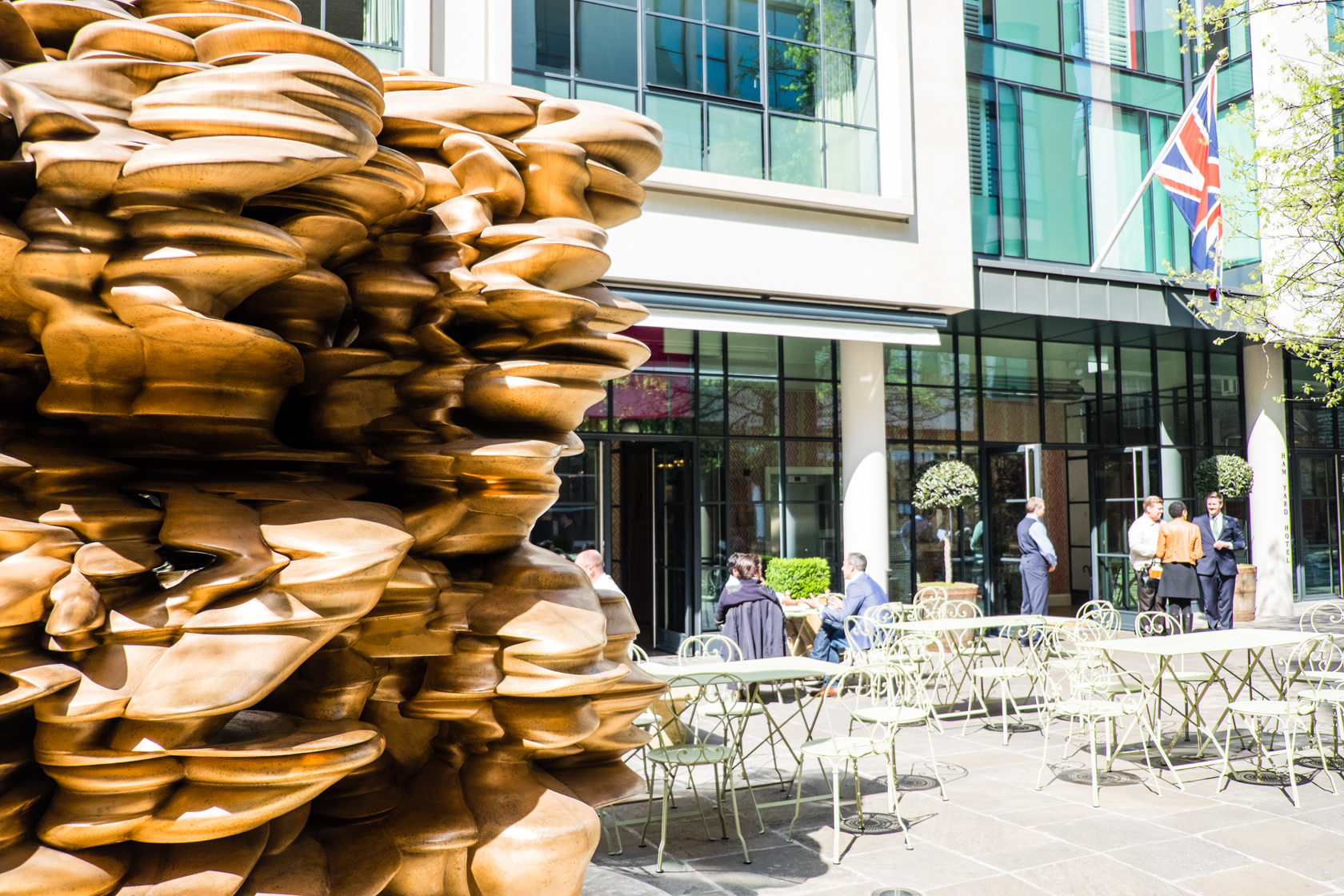
Ham Yard Hotel courtyard, London

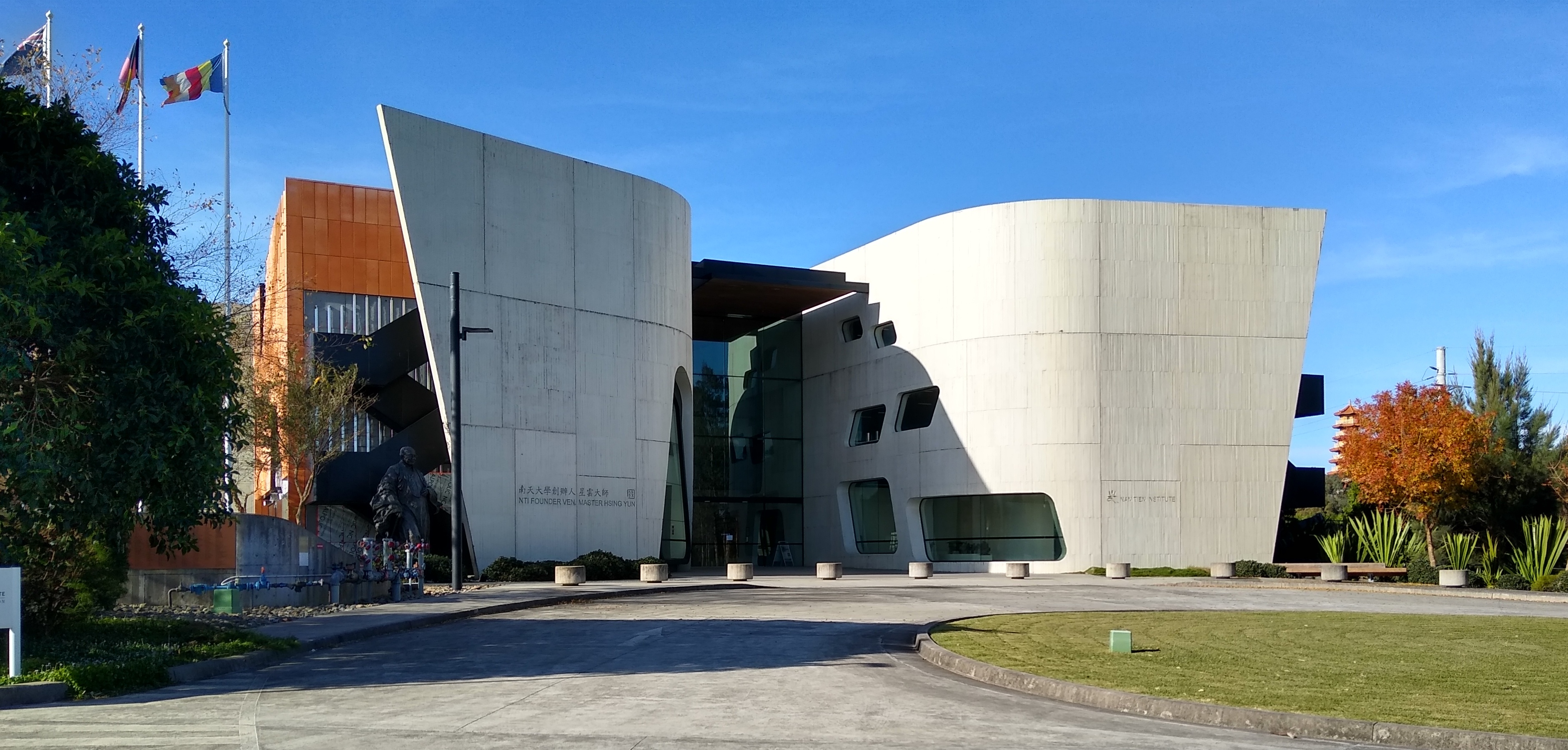
Nan Tien Institute, Wollongong

Woods Bagot has designed some landmark buildings throughout Australia and the world, including the following major architectural projects:

Completed	Project name	Location	Award	Notes
2022	Deakin Law Building	Melbourne, Burwood	AIA Educational Architecture Award, 2022 (Victoria); WAN Awards Gold Award for Higher Education and Research Facilities, 20022	See also; Sarah Ball
2017	Bodi Center Complex	Xiaoshan District, Hangzhou		
2017	Adelaide Convention Centre redevelopment	Adelaide		
	National Australia Bank building	Melbourne Docklands		
2016	1 William Street, Brisbane	Brisbane		
	Greenland Centre	Sydney		
2013	SAHMRI building	Adelaide		
	Ham Yard Hotel	London, England		
2010	Melbourne Convention & Exhibition Centre	Melbourne	National Award for Public Architecture, 2010; Melbourne Prize, 2010; William Wardell Award for Public Architecture, 2010 (Victoria); Steel Architecture Award, 2010 (Victoria); Award for Sustainable Architecture, 2010 (Victoria)	Joint venture with NH Architecture
	Student Learning Center, Cornell University School of Hotel Administration	Ithaca, New York		
2016	Wynyard Walk	Sydney		
	Eccleston Square Hotel	London		
2009	Qatar Science & Technology Park	Doha	Australian Institute of Architects International Architecture Award, 2009	
	World Trade Center Bhubaneswar	Odisha		
	College of the North Atlantic	Doha, Qatar		
	Nan Tien Institute and Cultural Centre	Wollongong		
	Cubus	Hong Kong		
	Delhi One	Noida, India		
	Wanxiang Century Centre	Hangzhou, China		
	Ningbo Youth Culture Plaza	Ningbo, China		
	Wanda Plaza	Kunming, China		
	One Shelley Street	Sydney		
	The Ivy	George Street, Sydney	AIA Harry Seidler Award for Commercial Architecture, 2009; Lloyd Rees Award for Urban Design, 2009 (NSW)	
1931	National War Memorial	Adelaide		
1932, + later (c.1960s) alterations.	Barr Smith Library, University of Adelaide	Adelaide		
1936	Bonython Hall, University of Adelaide	Adelaide		

=== Early work ===
In 1915, Woods, Bagot, Jory & Laybourne Smith designed a recreation hall for the Keswick Repatriation Hospital in Keswick, which opened on 11 February 1916.

== See also ==
- Architecture of Australia
