= Qatar Science & Technology Park =

Coordinates: 25°19′31.44″N 51°26′14.55″E

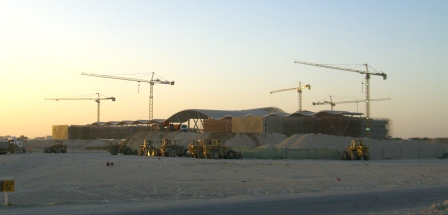

Qatar Science & Technology Park (QSTP) is a home for international technology companies in Qatar, and an incubator of start-up technology businesses.

Inaugurated in March 2009 as a part of Qatar Foundation, the purpose of the science park is to spur development of Qatar's knowledge economy. At an investment of more than $800 million by Qatar Foundation, the QSTP also became Qatar's first free-trade zone.

== Facilities and Functions ==
The QSTP complex was designed by Australian architects Woods Bagot, who won the Australian Institute of Architects National Award for their design.

QSTP functions by providing office and lab space to tenant companies, in a complex of multi-user and single-user buildings, and by providing professional services and support programs to those companies, such as the flagship QSTP XLR8, a tech business accelerator program. In September 2005 the Government of Qatar passed a law making the science park a "free zone", allowing foreign companies to set up a 100 percent owned entity free from tax and duties.

=== Management and Operations ===
QSTP has a staff of 1000 which includes all individuals that work at the science park for the QSTP entities, as well QSTP management.

== Collaboration and Ecosystem ==
A feature of QSTP is that it is co-located at Qatar Foundation's Education City alongside international universities. These include Carnegie Mellon, Cornell, Georgetown, Northwestern, Texas A&M and Virginia Commonwealth. The science park helps its tenant companies to collaborate with the universities, and acts as an incubator for spin-out ventures from the universities (and other sources).

=== Tenant Companies and Requirements ===
Tenants of QSTP are required to make technology development their main activity but can also trade commercially. The first companies to join QSTP were EADS, ExxonMobil, GE, Microsoft, Rolls-Royce, Shell, Total and iHorizons.

== Goals and Objectives ==
QSTP aims to grow Qatar's knowledge economy by encouraging companies and institutes from around the world to develop and commercialise their technology in these sectors in Qatar. In addition, to have a big responsibility and commitment to develop the role of Qataris themselves in the R&D technology sector and this includes providing high tech training, supporting new business startups and enhancing technology management skills. The move towards a knowledge based society requires focus and this is how it is structured for the coming years ahead. The second stage of development began in 2013, with one new facility being completed in 2014, and another in 2016.

=== International Recognition and Impact ===
QSTP is a member of the International Association of Science Parks and Areas of Innovation, an NGO in special consultative status with the UN, and in 2014 was the first Arab country to host the association's 31st World Conference.
