= James Campbell Irwin =

Australian architect and politician

James C. Irwin
- Born: 23 June 1906; North Adelaide
- Died: 22 June 1990 (aged 83)
- Occupation: Architect

Sir James Campbell Irwin (23 June 1906 – 22 June 1990) was an Australian architect and government official. Irwin studied architecture at the South Australian School of Mines and Industries, under the stewardship of George Soward. He joined the firm of Woods, Bagot, Jory & Laybourne-Smith as a draughtsman in 1927, becoming a partner in 1930.

Irwin worked on many notable buildings, including St Peter's Cathedral in Adelaide and many of the city's university and hospital buildings. He was appointed an officer of the Order of the British Empire in 1945 after a distinguished war career. He served on the Adelaide City Council from 1935 to 1972 (except for a gap between 1940 and 1949), including as Lord Mayor from 1963 to 1966. He was conferred a knighthood in recognition of his public service.
