= Electoral results for the Division of Angas (1949–1977) =

Australian division election results

This is a list of electoral results for the Division of Angas in Australian federal elections from the division's creation in 1949 until its abolition in 1977.

== Members ==
Member	Party	Term
Alexander Downer	Liberal	1949–1964
Geoffrey Giles	Liberal	1964–1977

== Election results ==
=== Elections in the 1970s ===
==== 1975 ====
1975 Australian federal election: Angas
Party	Candidate	Votes	%	±%
Liberal	Geoffrey Giles	37,281	68.1	+15.0
Labor	Adolf Thiel	14,977	26.9	−3.0
Liberal Movement	Giordano Graziani	2,255	4.0	+0.3
Workers	Richard Philippe	561	1.0	+1.0
Total formal votes		55,744	98.1	
Informal votes		1,109	1.9	
Turnout		56,883	96.3	
Two-party-preferred result
Liberal	Geoffrey Giles		71.5	+4.0
Labor	Adolf Thiel		28.5	−4.0
Liberal hold		Swing	+4.0	

==== 1974 ====
1974 Australian federal election: Angas
Party	Candidate	Votes	%	±%
Liberal	Geoffrey Giles	27,704	53.1	+6.0
Labor	Adolf Thiel	15,579	29.9	−3.0
Country	Sam Pfeiffer	6,011	11.5	−4.5
Liberal Movement	Henry Nicholls	1,918	3.7	+3.7
Australia	Kate Hannaford	965	1.8	+1.8
Total formal votes		52,177	97.2	
Informal votes		1,485	2.8	
Turnout		53,662	96.7	
Two-party-preferred result
Liberal	Geoffrey Giles		67.5	+3.5
Labor	Adolf Thiel		32.5	−3.5
Liberal hold		Swing	+3.5	

==== 1972 ====
1972 Australian federal election: Angas
Party	Candidate	Votes	%	±%
Liberal	Geoffrey Giles	22,191	47.1	−10.4
Labor	Adolf Thiel	15,530	32.9	−4.3
Country	John Petch	7,543	16.0	+16.0
Democratic Labor	Terence Critchley	1,892	4.0	−1.3
Total formal votes		47,156	97.0	
Informal votes		1,447	3.0	
Turnout		48,603	97.3	
Two-party-preferred result
Liberal	Geoffrey Giles	30,167	64.0	+2.1
Labor	Adolf Thiel	16,989	36.0	−2.1
Liberal hold		Swing	+2.1	

=== Elections in the 1960s ===
==== 1969 ====
1969 Australian federal election: Angas
Party	Candidate	Votes	%	±%
Liberal	Geoffrey Giles	25,771	57.5	−12.7
Labor	Harold McLaren	16,649	37.2	+7.5
Democratic Labor	Terence Critchley	2,372	5.3	+5.3
Total formal votes		44,792	97.0	
Informal votes		1,375	3.0	
Turnout		46,167	96.4	
Two-party-preferred result
Liberal	Geoffrey Giles		61.9	−8.4
Labor	Harold McLaren		38.1	+8.4
Liberal hold		Swing	−8.4	

==== 1966 ====
1966 Australian federal election: Angas
Party	Candidate	Votes	%	±%
Liberal	Geoffrey Giles	30,070	70.7	+8.8
Labor	Robert Nielsen	12,464	29.3	−6.2
Total formal votes		42,534	97.5	
Informal votes		1,092	2.5	
Turnout		43,626	96.7	
Liberal hold		Swing	+8.5	

==== 1964 by-election ====
Angas by-election, 1964
Party	Candidate	Votes	%	±%
Liberal	Geoffrey Giles	23,468	60.3	−1.6
Labor	Robert Nielsen	15,452	39.7	+4.2
Total formal votes		38,920	98.4	
Informal votes		623	1.6	
Turnout		39,543	91.2	
Liberal hold		Swing	−1.9	

==== 1963 ====
1963 Australian federal election: Angas
Party	Candidate	Votes	%	±%
Liberal	Alick Downer	25,676	61.9	+5.2
Labor	Robert Nielsen	14,709	35.5	−0.8
Communist	Elliott Johnston	1,075	2.6	+2.6
Total formal votes		41,460	98.4	
Informal votes		665	1.6	
Turnout		42,125	97.4	
Two-party-preferred result
Liberal	Alick Downer		62.2	+0.6
Labor	Robert Nielsen		37.8	−0.6
Liberal hold		Swing	+0.6	

==== 1961 ====
1961 Australian federal election: Angas
Party	Candidate	Votes	%	±%
Liberal	Alick Downer	22,798	56.7	−4.7
Labor	Arnold Busbridge	14,587	36.3	+6.0
Democratic Labor	John Balogh	2,853	7.1	+0.5
Total formal votes		40,238	97.2	
Informal votes		1,165	2.8	
Turnout		41,403	97.0	
Two-party-preferred result
Liberal	Alick Downer		61.6	−6.1
Labor	Arnold Busbridge		38.4	+6.1
Liberal hold		Swing	−6.1	

=== Elections in the 1950s ===
==== 1958 ====
1958 Australian federal election: Angas
Party	Candidate	Votes	%	±%
Liberal	Alick Downer	23,987	61.4	−8.6
Labor	Darcy Nielsen	11,832	30.3	+4.6
Democratic Labor	Susan Critchley	2,581	6.6	+6.6
Independent	Sydney Edwards	677	1.7	+1.7
Total formal votes		39,077	96.7	
Informal votes		1,336	3.3	
Turnout		40,413	97.0	
Two-party-preferred result
Liberal	Alick Downer		67.7	−4.5
Labor	Darcy Nielsen		32.3	+4.5
Liberal hold		Swing	−4.5	

==== 1955 ====
1955 Australian federal election: Angas
Party	Candidate	Votes	%	±%
Liberal	Alick Downer	26,823	70.0	−30.0
Labor	Darcy Nielsen	9,871	25.7	+25.7
Independent	Frank Rieck	1,643	4.3	+4.3
Total formal votes		38,337	96.2	
Informal votes		1,533	3.8	
Turnout		39,870	96.7	
Two-party-preferred result
Liberal	Alick Downer		72.2	−27.8
Labor	Darcy Nielsen		27.8	+27.8
Liberal hold		Swing	−27.8	

==== 1954 ====
1954 Australian federal election: Angas
Party	Candidate	Votes	%	±%
Liberal	Alick Downer	unopposed		
Liberal hold		Swing		

==== 1951 ====
1951 Australian federal election: Angas
Party	Candidate	Votes	%	±%
Liberal	Alick Downer	25,323	63.9	+3.1
Labor	John Edwards	14,324	36.1	+1.6
Total formal votes		39,647	97.9	
Informal votes		863	2.1	
Turnout		40,510	97.1	
Liberal hold		Swing	+0.8	

=== Elections in the 1940s ===
==== 1949 ====
1949 Australian federal election: Angas
Party	Candidate	Votes	%	±%
Liberal	Alick Downer	23,987	60.8	+8.9
Labor	Albert Strachan	13,615	34.5	−10.3
Independent	Ralph Whittle	1,857	4.7	+4.7
Total formal votes		39,459	97.6	
Informal votes		965	2.4	
Turnout		40,424	97.2	
Two-party-preferred result
Liberal	Alick Downer		63.1	+8.1
Labor	Albert Strachan		36.9	−8.1
Liberal notional hold		Swing	+8.1	
