= George John Robert Murray =

Australia judge and academic (1863–1942)

The Honourable Sir George Murray KCMG
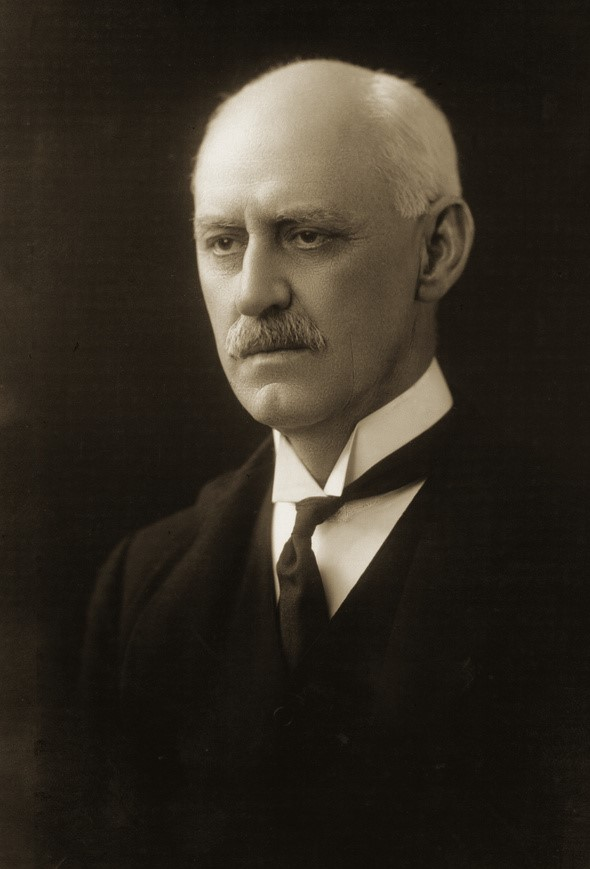

4th Chancellor of the University of Adelaide
- In office 1916 – 18 February 1942
- Preceded by: Sir Samuel Way
- Succeeded by: Sir William Mitchell

Chief Justice of South Australia
- In office 20 January 1916 – 18 February 1942
- Preceded by: Sir Samuel Way
- Succeeded by: Sir Mellis Napier

7th Vice-Chancellor of the University of Adelaide
- In office 1915–1916
- Chancellor: Sir Samuel Way
- Preceded by: William Barlow
- Succeeded by: Sir William Mitchell; Edward Henry Rennie (acting); Sir Robert William Chapman (acting)

Personal details
- Born: 27 September 1863 Magill, Colony of South Australia
- Died: 18 March 1942 (aged 78) Magill, South Australia
- Parent: Alexander Borthwick Murray (father)
- Education: University of Adelaide; Trinity College, Cambridge

The Hon. Sir George John Robert Murray KCMG (27 September 1863 – 18 February 1942) was an Australian judge, politician, and academic administrator. He was a judge from 2 April 1913 until 18 February 1942 on the Supreme Court of South Australia, which is the highest-ranking court in the Australian State of South Australia. He was Chief Judge from 20 January 1916 until 18 February 1942.

== Early life ==
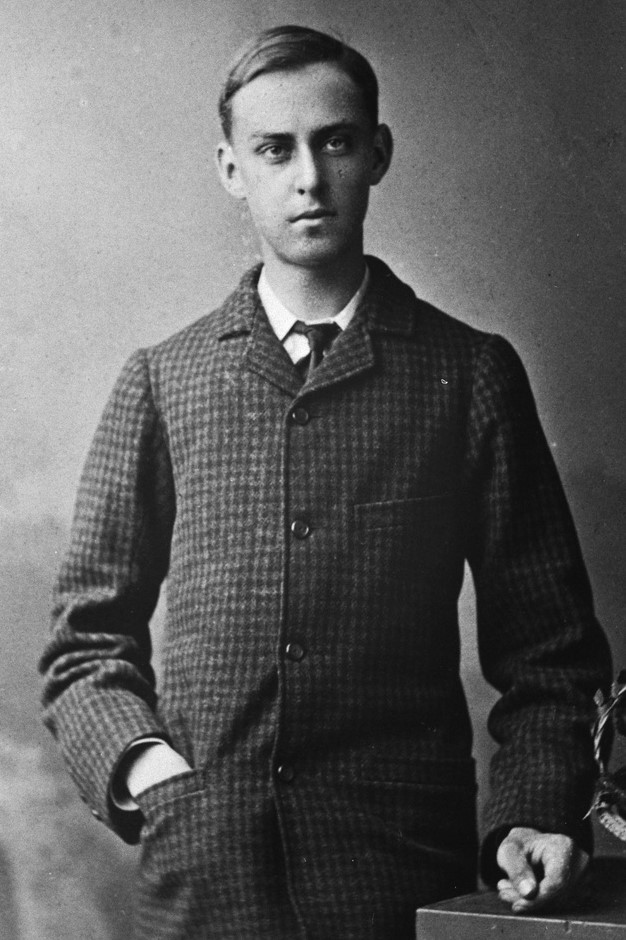
George Murray c. 1885

George John Robert Murray was born on 27 September 1863 at Murray Park, Magill, near Adelaide, the second surviving son of Alexander Borthwick Murray, a pioneer sheep-breeder and South Australia politician, and his second wife Margaret, née Tinline.

He was first educated at John L. Young's Adelaide Educational Institution then spent two years at the Royal High School, Edinburgh and St Peter's College, Adelaide, where he won the Prankerd, Wyatt, Christchurch, and Farrell scholarships. At the University of Adelaide, Murray won the John Howard Clark scholarship for English literature in 1882, qualified for the BA degree in 1883, and won the South Australian Scholarship. This allowed him to study at the University of Cambridge, where he took his B.A. and LL.B. degrees, being bracketed senior in the law tripos in 1887.

Murray also represented Cambridge in cricket and rowing.

== Career ==
=== Academia ===
Murray was the 7th vice-chancellor of the University of Adelaide from 1915 to 1916. He was the 4th chancellor of the university from 1916 to 18 February 1942.

=== Legal ===
Murray was held in high regard by the legal profession. He was a judge from 2 April 1913 until 18 February 1942 on the Supreme Court of South Australia, which is the highest ranking court in the Australian State of South Australia. He was Chief Judge from 20 January 1916 until 18 February 1942.

=== Politics ===
Murray administered the government of as the Lieutenant Governor of South Australia on numerous occasions in the absence of the Governor.

== Honours ==
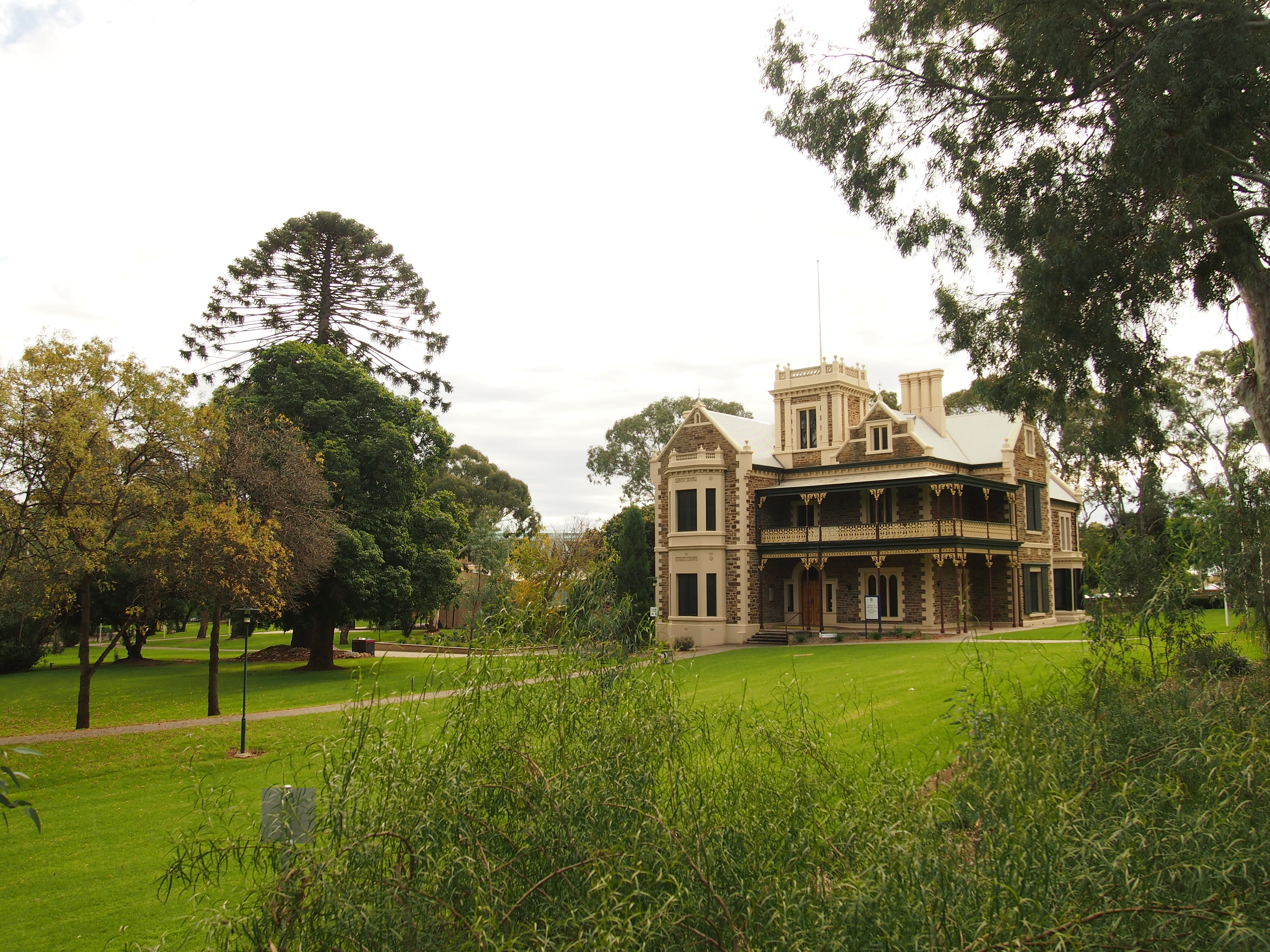
Murray House and landscaped grounds, formerly 'Murray Park', now part of UniSA Magill Campus

Murray was became a member of Order of St Michael and St George in 1917.

The heritage-listed George Murray Building, part of the Union Buildings at the university, designed by Woods, Bagot, Jory and Laybourne-Smith and built in 1937, was named after him.

Every year at St. Peter's College the house with the highest performance and effort in house events is awarded the George Murray Shield.

== Personal life ==
He died in Adelaide following an operation for appendicitis on 18 February 1942; he was buried in St George's Church of England cemetery, Magill.

In 1908 he endowed the University of Adelaide with £1,000 to establish the Tinline Scholarship in History in recognition of the family of his mother, born Margaret Tinline (c. 1823 – 17 August 1907).

Legal offices
Preceded by Sir Samuel Way	Chief Justice of South Australia; 1916–1942	Succeeded by Sir Mellis Napier
Government offices
Preceded by Sir Samuel Way	Lieutenant-Governor of South Australia; 1916–1942	Succeeded by Sir Mellis Napier
Academic offices
Preceded by Sir Samuel Way	Chancellor of the University of Adelaide; 1916–1942	Succeeded by Sir William Mitchell
