= Division of Angas =

The Division of Angas refers to two former electoral divisions for the Australian House of Representatives, both based in rural South Australia:

- Division of Angas (1903–34)
- Division of Angas (1949–77)
