= Robert William Chapman (engineer) =

Australian mathematician and engineer

Sir Robert William Chapman
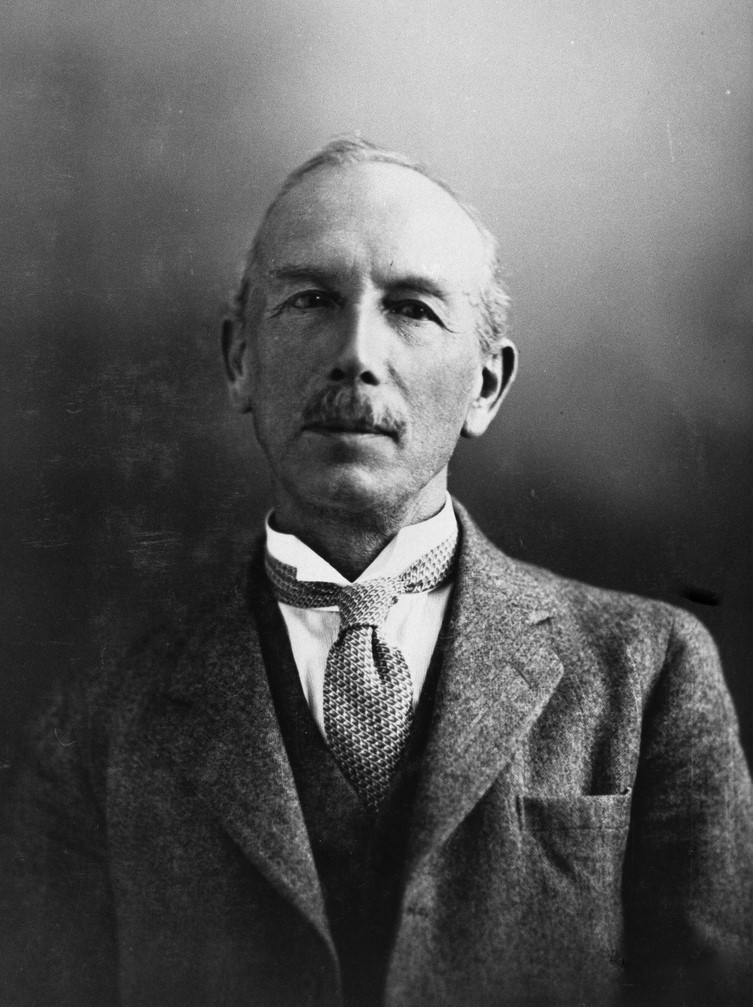
- Sir Chapman in 1931

Acting Vice-Chancellor of the University of Adelaide
- In office 1928 – 1935 (intermittent)
- Chancellor: Sir George JR Murray
- Preceded by: Sir William Mitchell
- Succeeded by: Sir William Mitchell

Personal details
- Born: 27 December 1866 Stony Stratford, England, United Kingdom of Great Britain and Ireland (now United Kingdom)
- Died: 27 February 1942 (aged 75) Adelaide, South Australia, Australia
- Resting place: North Road Cemetery

Sir Robert William Chapman CMG MICE MIEAust (27 December 1866 – 27 February 1942) was an Australian mathematician and engineer.

== History ==
Chapman was born in Stony Stratford in Buckinghamshire, England, eldest son of Charles Chapman (c. 1838 – 14 September 1921), a currier from Melbourne, Australia, and his wife Matilda, née Harrison (c. 1840 – 23 October 1933). His parents returned to Melbourne in 1876, where he was educated at Wesley College and the University of Melbourne, graduating MA and BCE with first class honours in Physics and Mathematics.

In 1888, at the recommendation of Professor William Bragg, he was appointed a lecturer in Mathematics and Physics at Adelaide University. He was appointed Professor of Engineering in 1907 and served as (Sir Thomas) Elder Professor of Mathematics and Mechanics from 1910 when Professor Bragg was appointed to the Cavendish chair of physics in the University of Leeds. Chapman then returned to his previous post in 1919. He frequently served as Vice-Chancellor (in an acting capacity) during the absence of Sir William Mitchell. He retired in 1937. He was appointed president of the School of Mines council in 1939 on the death of Sir Langdon Bonython.

His research work included:

- (With Thomas Roberts (1845–1920)) Breakage of locomotive and other railway axles
- Established a laboratory where local stone and timber could be tested
- Distribution of stress in steel reinforcing rods in concrete
- Effects of building a dam on the Mundoo Channel, Lake Alexandrina
- Use of brown coal from Leigh Creek, including briquettes

== Recognition and memberships ==
He was elected to the Royal Society of South Australia in 1888 and to the Australian Association for the Advancement of Science.

He was a founding member of the South Australian Institute of Engineers and a foundation member of the Institution of Engineers Australia in 1921, in 1918 the first chairman of its South Australian division and the third Federal President. He was awarded their Peter Nicol Russell Memorial Medal in 1928 and made honorary life member in 1932.

He was awarded Melbourne University's Kernot Medal in 1927.

He was president of the Astronomical Society of South Australia for a record 32 years and elected a Fellow of the Royal Astronomical Society in 1902? 1909?.

He was a member of the council of the Australasian Institute of Mining Engineers and in 1920 elected president of the Australasian Institute of Mining and Metallurgy.

He was a member of the South Australian Institute of Surveyors from 1912 and president 1917–1929

He was a member of the councils of both the University of Adelaide and the School of Mines.

On his retirement from the University of Adelaide in 1937 he was made Emeritus Professor; his portrait, by Ivor Hele hangs in the School of Engineering's Chapman Lecture Theatre, which was named for him.

He was appointed a Companion of the Order of St Michael and St George (CMG) in the 1927 Birthday Honours and knighted in 1938.

== Family ==
On 14 February 1889 he married Eva Maud Hall. They had six sons and two daughters.

- Robert Hall Chapman (6 January 1890 – 10 May 1953) engaged to Florence Muriel Day, but she married footballer Charlie Perry. Robert Hall Chapman married May Warren Knox. He was chief engineer, later commissioner, with the South Australian Railways.
- Charles George Chapman (19 November 1891 – April 1916), was a lieutenant with the Royal Engineers, killed in Mesopotamia during World War I.
- Eva Florence Chapman (5 December 1893 – ) married Essington Day on 19 March 1919, lived at Burnside
- Lilian Eleanor Chapman (1895–1975) married Edgar Bills of Orroroo on 4 October 1922, lived at Peterborough
- Walter Harrison Chapman (1896– ) of Bulolo, New Guinea
- James Douglas Chapman (1901–1948) married Gwendolen Ruth Johnston on 7 January 1929. He was an engineer with the Adelaide City Council
- Ernest Stirling Chapman (1907– ), was a dentist in Clare
- Leslie Drake Chapman (8 December 1911– ) engaged to Ellen Rose McBeath. He was engineer associated with the Goolwa barrage.
