= 1964 Parramatta by-election =

A by-election was held for the Australian House of Representatives seat of Parramatta on 20 June 1964. This was triggered by the resignation of Liberal MP and Attorney-General Sir Garfield Barwick to become Chief Justice of the High Court. A by-election for the seat of Angas was held on the same day.

The by-election was won by Liberal candidate Nigel Bowen.

== Results ==
Parramatta by-election, 1964
Party	Candidate	Votes	%	±%
Liberal	Nigel Bowen	26,506	52.1	−3.9
Labor	Barry Wilde	21,227	41.8	+3.3
Democratic Labor	Edward Beck	2,701	5.3	−0.2
Independent	Augustus Fenwick	248	0.5	+0.5
Independent	John Phillips	152	0.3	+0.3
Total formal votes		50,834	98.1	
Informal votes		975	1.9	
Turnout		51,809	87.6	
Two-party-preferred result
Liberal	Nigel Bowen		56.9	−3.5
Labor	Barry Wilde		43.1	+3.5
Liberal hold		Swing	−3.5	
