= Mellis Napier =

Australian judge and academic administrator

The Honourable Sir Mellis Napier KCMG QC
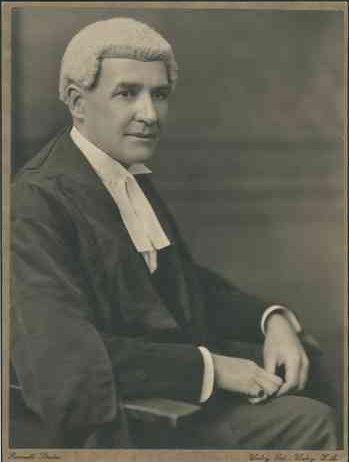

Chief Justice of South Australia
- In office 25 February 1942 – 28 February 1967
- Preceded by: Sir George Murray
- Succeeded by: John Bray

Lieutenant-Governor of South Australia
- In office 30 April 1942 – 3 September 1973
- Preceded by: Sir George Murray
- Succeeded by: Sir Walter Crocker

Judge of the Supreme Court of South Australia
- In office 28 February 1924 – 28 February 1967
- Preceded by: Sir John Gordon
- Succeeded by: John Bray

6th Chancellor of the University of Adelaide
- In office 1 February 1948 – 29 September 1961 (appointed 21 October 1947)
- Preceded by: Sir William Mitchell
- Succeeded by: Sir George Ligertwood

Personal details
- Born: 24 October 1882 Dunbar, East Lothian, Scotland
- Died: 22 March 1976 (aged 93) Kingswood, South Australia

Sir Thomas John Mellis Napier KCMG QC (24 October 1882 – 22 March 1976) was an Australian judge and academic administrator. He was a judge of the Supreme Court of South Australia (1924–1967), Chief Justice of South Australia (1942–1967), and Chancellor of the University of Adelaide (1948–1961).

== Early life and education ==
Thomas John Mellis Napier was born in Dunbar in East Lothian to Dr. Alexander Disney Leith Napier FRSE and his wife Jessie Mellis. The family moved to London in 1887, where he attended the City of London School, and emigrated to Australia in 1896, Alexander Napier having taken the post of senior resident physician at the Royal Adelaide Hospital.

Thomas Napier studied law at the University of Adelaide, graduating LLB in 1902.

== Legal career and related activities ==
In 1903 Napier became managing clerk for Kingston & McLachlan, and became a partner with McLachlan in 1906.

He was appointed judge of the Supreme Court of South Australia on 28 February 1924, serving until 28 February 1967, and served as Chief Justice of South Australia from 25 February 1942 until 28 February 1967.

In 1964, Napier presided over the trial of Glen Sabre Valance, the last man hanged in South Australia. Valance was also the second-to-last man to be executed in Australia overall.

== Other roles ==
In 1912, together with Thomas Poole, Napier resuscitated the Law Society of South Australia, and served as its vice president in 1923.

Napier was Chancellor of the University of Adelaide from 1948 to 1961.

== Honours ==
- 1935: King George V Silver Jubilee Medal
- 1937: King George VI Coronation Medal
- 30 April 1942: appointed Lieutenant-Governor of South Australia
- 1943: Knight Bachelor
- 1945: Knight Commander of the Order of St Michael and St George (KCMG)
- 1949: Knight of the Venerable Order of St John
- 1949: Knight of the Venerable Order of St John of Jerusalem (KStJ)
- 1953: Queen Elizabeth II Coronation Medal

== Recognition and legacy ==
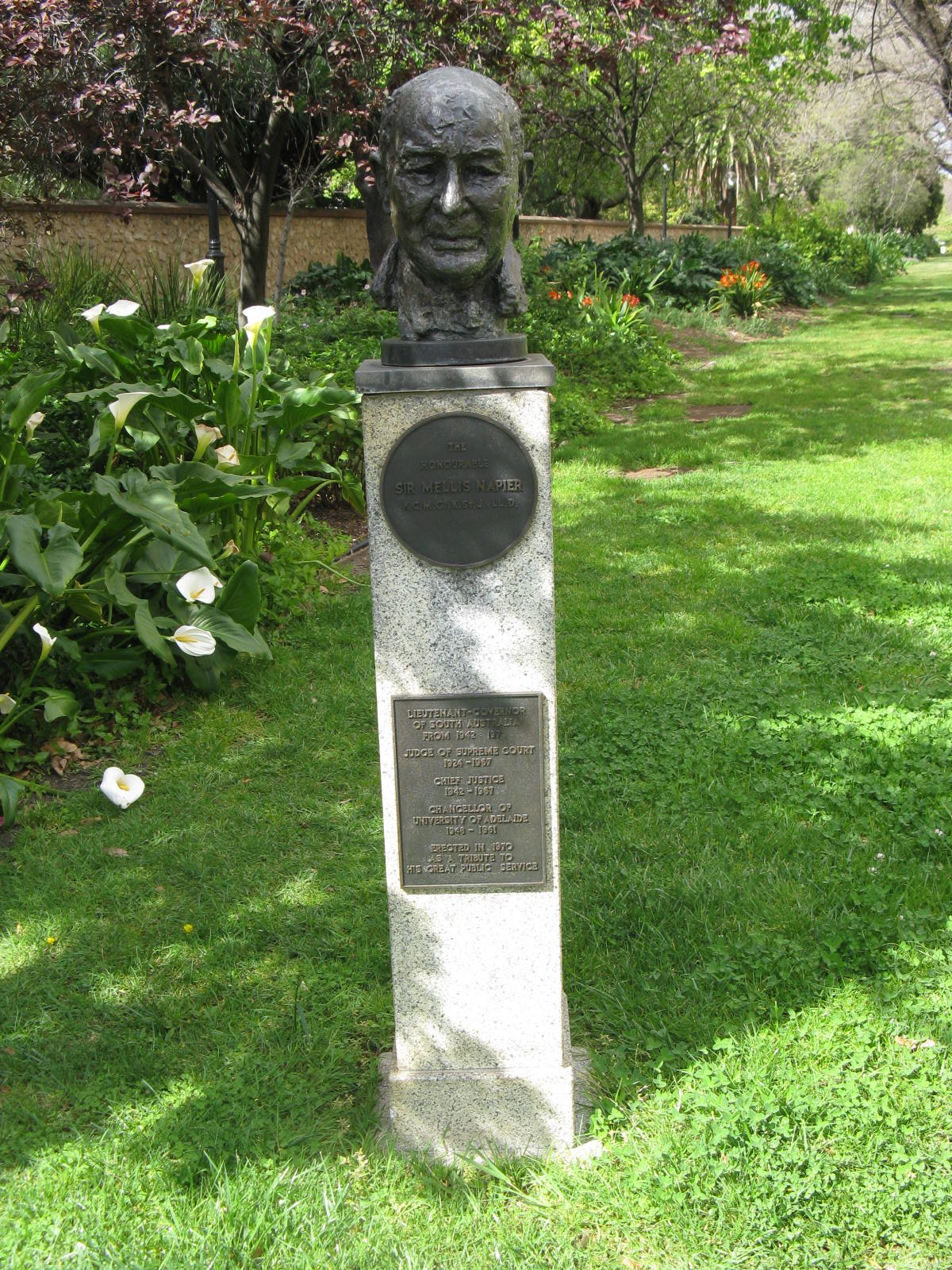
Dowie's bust of Mellis Napier

- The Napier Mountains, first charted in January 1930 by the British Australian New Zealand Antarctic Research Expedition under Sir Douglas Mawson, was named by Mawson after Sir Mellis Napier.
- The Napier Building, erected between 1958 and 1965 on the North Terrace campus of the University of Adelaide, was named in honour of him.
- The South Australian Electoral district of Napier, from 1977 to 2018
- His bust by John Dowie, erected in 1970, stands near the gates of Government House in Adelaide.
- South Australian Railways locomotive number 524 was named after Napier.

== Personal life ==
On 24 October 1908 Napier married Dorothy Bell Kay (died 1959) at Walkerville. They had three sons, one of whom was killed while serving with the Royal Australian Air Force in 1944.

He died on 22 March 1976 at Kingswood, South Australia and, following a state funeral, was cremated.

Legal offices
Preceded by Sir George Murray	Chief Justice of South Australia; 1942–1967	Succeeded by John Bray
Government offices
Preceded by Sir George Murray	Lieutenant-Governor of South Australia; 1942–1973	Succeeded by Sir Walter Crocker
Academic offices
Preceded by Sir William Mitchell	Chancellor of the University of Adelaide; 1948–1961	Succeeded by Sir George Ligertwood
