= Barr Smith Library =

Academic library of Adelaide University, South Australia

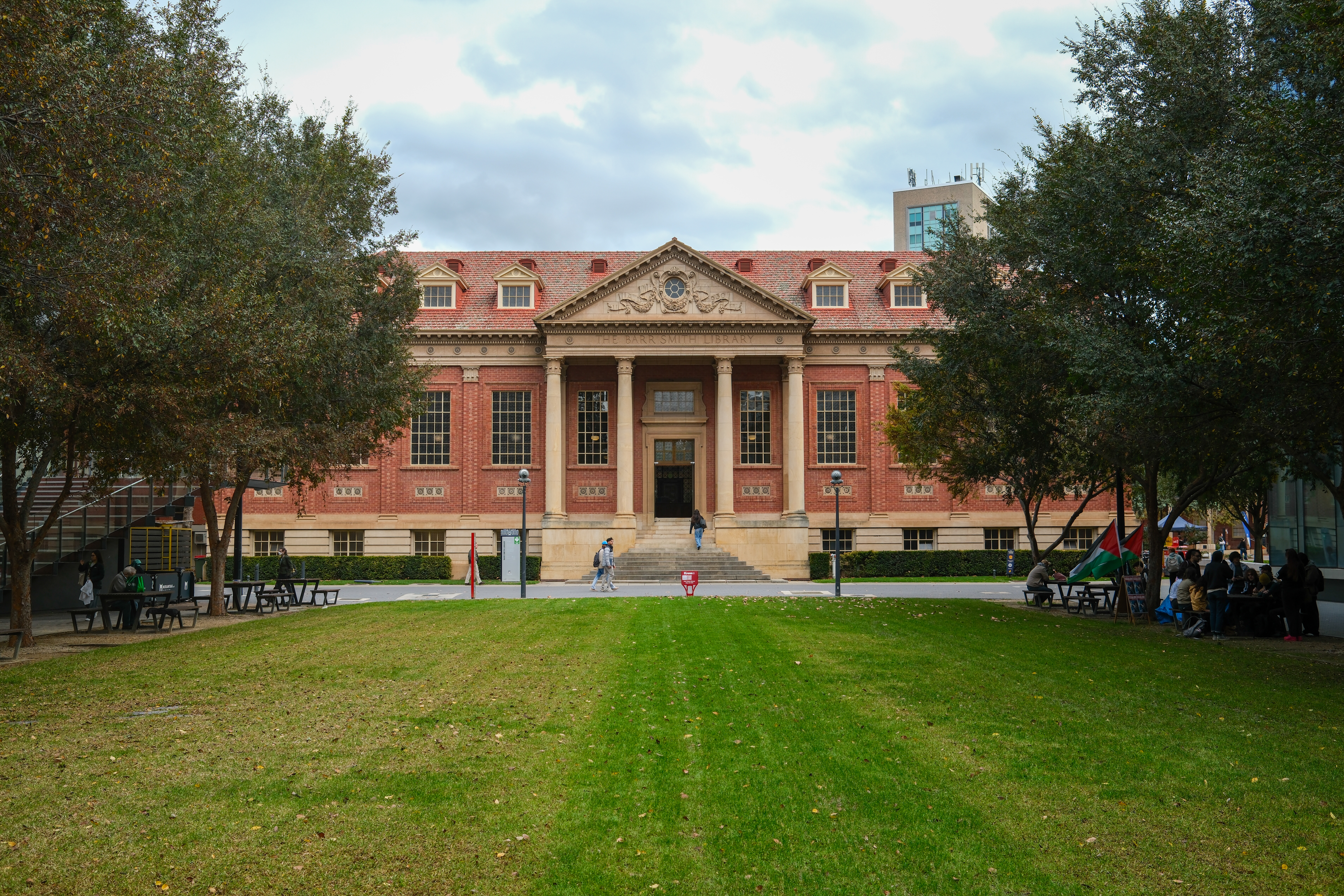
- The library in 2026

General information
- Type: Academic library
- Architectural style: Georgian Revival
- Location: North Terrace, Adelaide, South Australia, Australia
- Coordinates: 34.919168°S 138.605013°E
- Named for: Robert Barr Smith
- Construction started: 1930
- Opened: 4 March 1932

Design and construction
- Architect: Walter Bagot
- Architecture firm: Woods, Bagot & Laybourne Smith

Website
- Official website

South Australian Heritage Register
- Official name: Barr Smith Library – University of Adelaide
- Type: State Heritage Place
- Designated: 23 September 1982
- Reference no.: 10643
- Listed extent: Original building only

The Barr Smith Library is the main library of Adelaide University, situated in the centre of the North Terrace campus. It is named after its early benefactor Robert Barr Smith and was formally established in 1882, though its history dates back to 1877 when it purchased its first book.

== History ==
The Barr Smith Library is the third-oldest university library in Australia and was originally located in the Mitchell Building. The library purchased its first book in 1877 for £11, prior to its formal establishment in 1882. It was later named after its founder Robert Barr Smith who throughout his life had donated £9,000 to purchase books towards the struggling library, which previously had no librarian and an annual budget of £200 of which £150 were spent on books. William Barlow, the registrar, acted as the de facto first librarian of the then-small library and R. J. M. Clucas was the first official librarian in 1900.

Following Robert's death in 1915, an additional endowment of £11,000 in 1920 was made by his family. In 1928, his son Tony Elder Barr Smith donated almost £35,000 towards a new building for the library to reduce congestion at its original site. Robert's granddaughter Christine Margaret Mcgregor also donated almost 5,000 books in 1974. The building was designed in the Georgian Revival architecture style by Walter Hervey Bagot of the Adelaide-based architecture firm Woods, Bagot & Laybourne Smith and was inspired by Kensington Palace in London. Following its completion, its collection was transferred from the Mitchell Building through a zip line. The building features red-brick exteriors with an entrance with Corinthian pillars below an inscription reading "The Barr Smith Library". It was later expanded twice to increase capacity, reaching a peak of 2.4 million books in 2014.

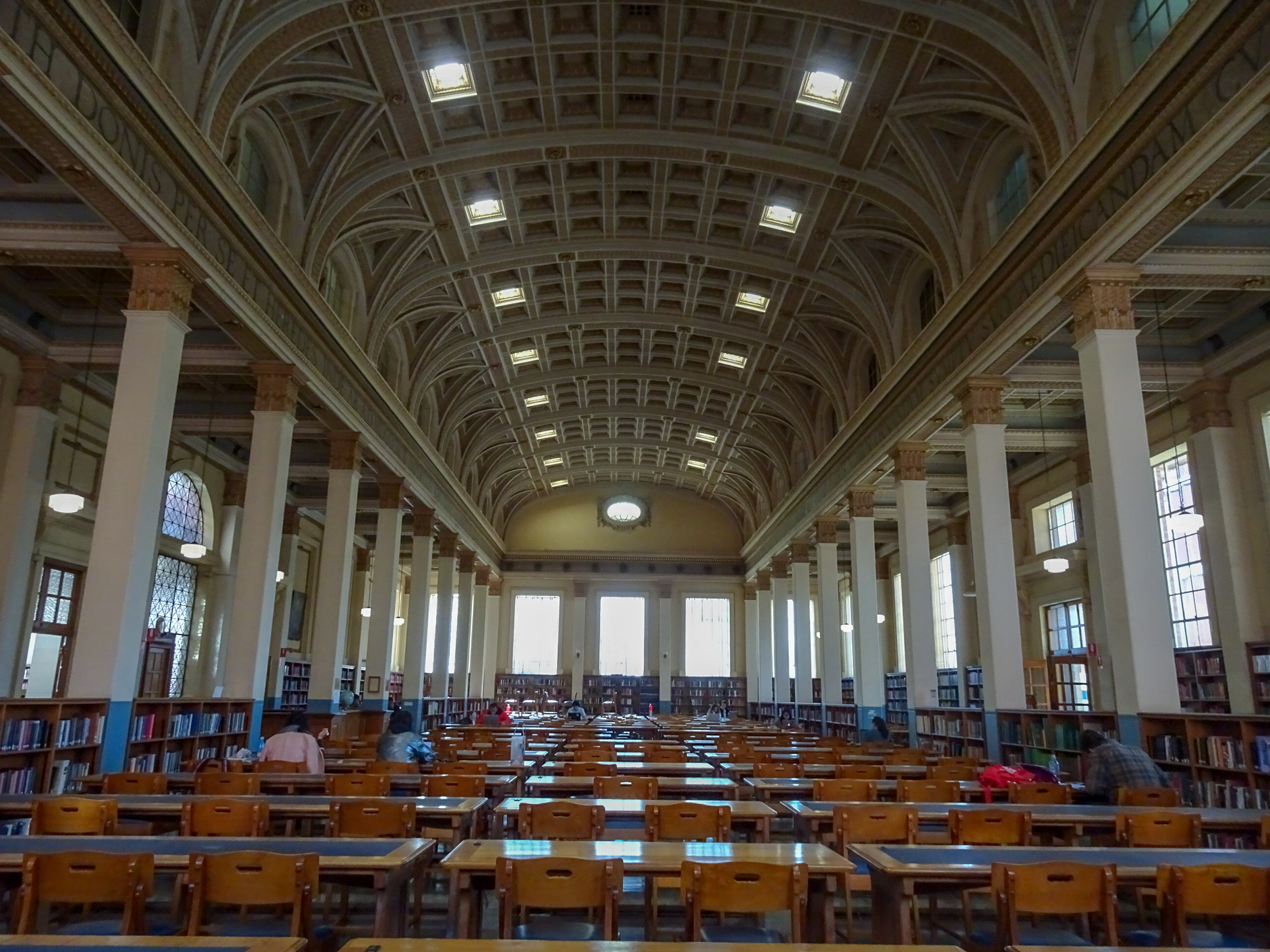
The Reading Room in the library features gilded ivory arches and tall pillars

The Barr Smith Reading Room is a notable feature of the library on Level 2. It features oak flooring and furniture with white pillars holding the gilded and ivory arches that form the rounded ceiling. Between the pillars and the arches are two large Latin inscriptions that run across both sides of the room in gold and commemorate the donations from Robert and his family who played a major role in its development. In mid-2023, over 61 paper planes were found in ledges around the ceiling of the reading room, including one made using a university brochure dating back to 1991.

The library is also home to a collection of rare books, the archives documenting the development of the university among other collections across various subject areas. This includes books belonging to Samuel Way's collection, who had donated 16,000 books.

== Description ==
The library houses Rare Books and Special Collections and University Archives and Recordkeeping. It is also home to large collections across many subject areas including Australian history, politics and literature, English literature, world wars, socialism and fascism, women and gender studies, utopian literature, and food studies. Specialist collections include the Music Collection, East Asian Collection, Yaitya Ngutupira and Recreational Reading. Level 2 of the library is home to the large and opulent Reading Room. The High Use Collection and study spaces on level 3 can be accessed 24/7. The library offers more than 500 places for individual study along with over 130 computer workstations.

The Library holds Rare Books and Special Collections area comprising roughly of 85,000 items. The area hold books arranged into several collections: the "Strong room collection", "Rare room collection", "Pacific collection", "Theatre", "University" and "Minor collection".

== Librarians ==
William Barlow, the registrar, acted as the de facto first librarian of the then-small library and R. J. M. Clucas was the first official librarian in 1900. Siân Woolcock is the current University Librarian of Adelaide University.

Notable library employees include:

- Helga Josephine Zinnbauer 1943–1974

== Gallery ==
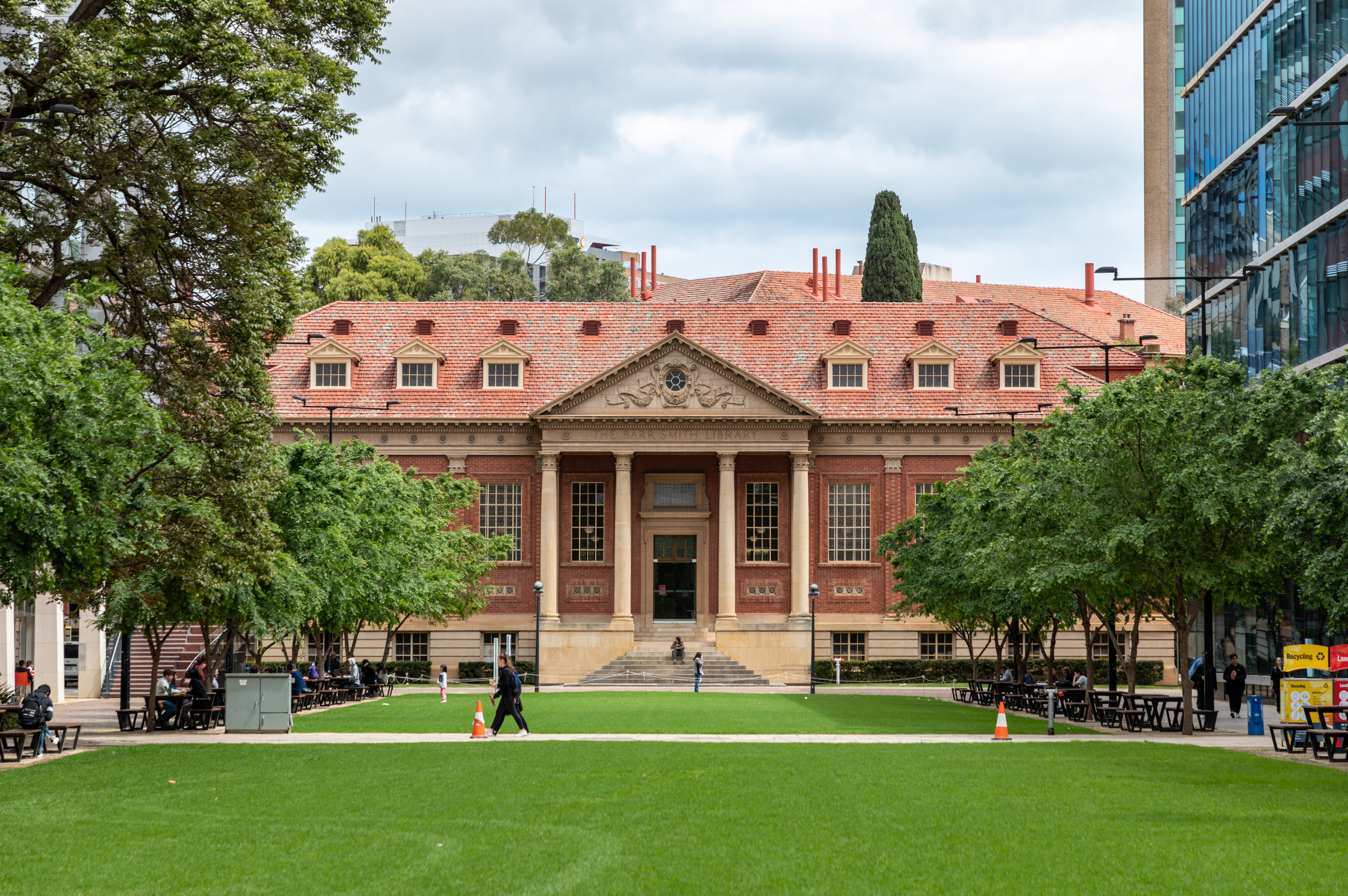
Exterior

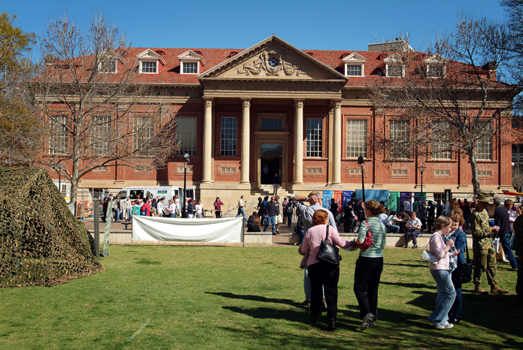
Open day, 2006

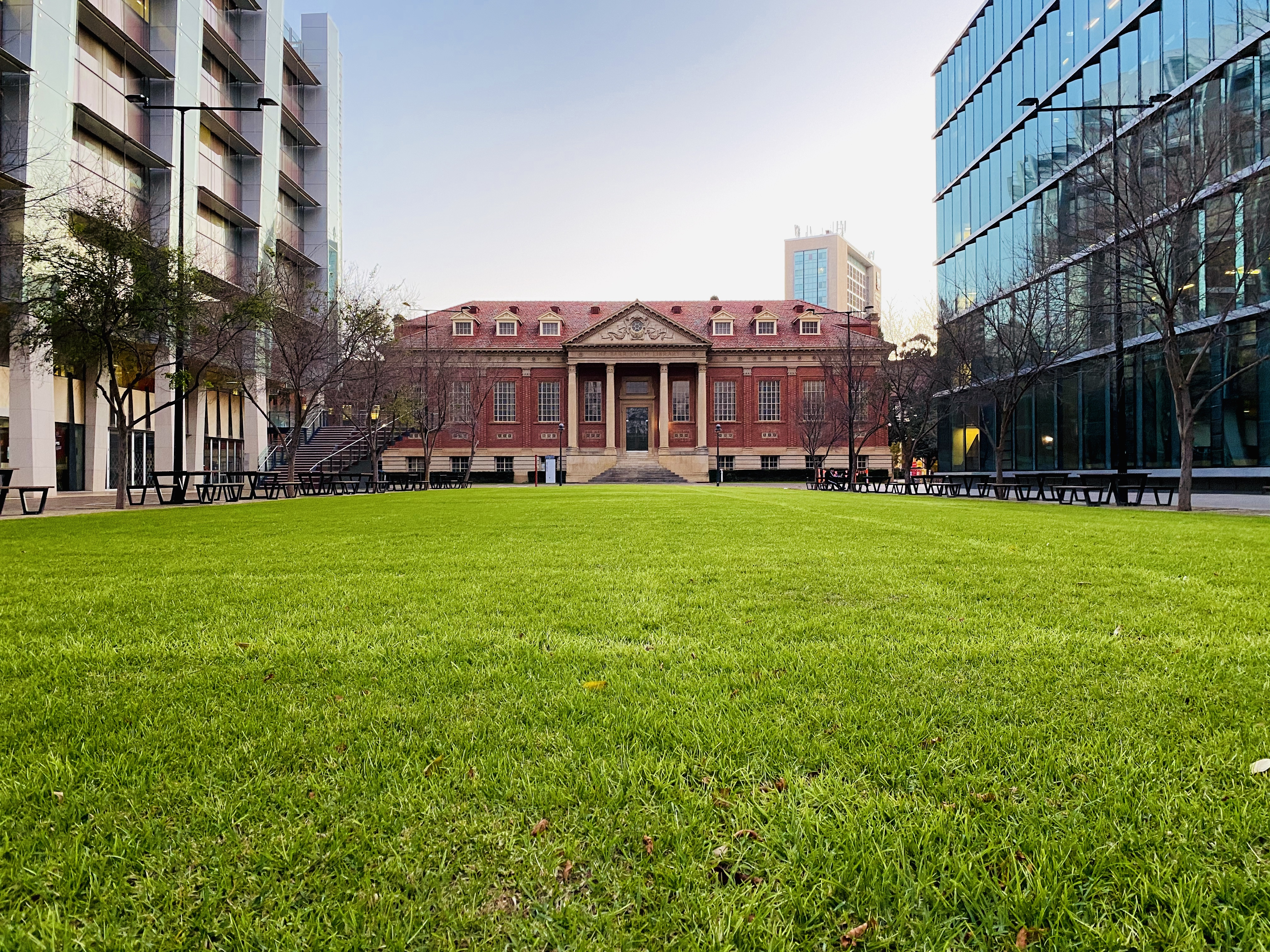
Front lawn
