= 1964 Angas by-election =

A by-election was held for the Australian House of Representatives seat of Angas on 20 June 1964. This was triggered by the resignation of Liberal MP and former Immigration Minister Alick Downer to become Australian High Commissioner to the United Kingdom. A by-election for the seat of Parramatta was held on the same day.

The by-election was won by Liberal candidate Geoffrey Giles.

== Results ==
Angas by-election, 1964
Party	Candidate	Votes	%	±%
Liberal	Geoffrey Giles	23,468	60.3	−1.6
Labor	Robert Nielsen	15,452	39.7	+4.2
Total formal votes		38,920	98.4	
Informal votes		623	1.6	
Turnout		39,543	91.2	
Liberal hold		Swing	−1.9	
