= Edward Rennie =

Edward Henry Rennie
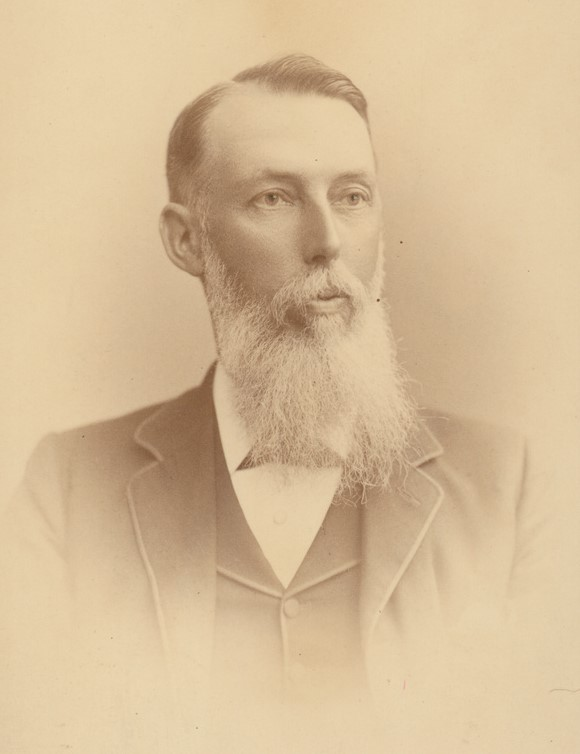

Acting Vice-Chancellor of the University of Adelaide
- In office 1924 – 1926 (intermittent)
- Chancellor: Sir George JR Murray
- Preceded by: Sir William Mitchell
- Succeeded by: Sir William Mitchell

Edward Henry Rennie (19 August 1852 – 8 January 1927) was an Australian scientist and a president of the Royal Society of South Australia.

== Early life ==
Rennie was born in Balmain, Sydney, the eldest son of Edward Alexander Rennie, who later became auditor-general. E. H. Rennie was educated at the Fort Street public school, Sydney Grammar School, and the University of Sydney where he graduated B.A. (1870) and M.A. (1876); there he was influenced by Archibald Liversidge. He taught at Sydney Grammar School and Brisbane Grammar School before leaving for London to study chemistry.

== Scientific career ==
Rennie's legacy is evident with the Rennie Memorial Medal, issued annually by the RACI for outstanding research by an early career chemistry researcher.

== Late life ==
He served as acting vice-chancellor of the University of Adelaide thrice between 1924–1926, covering for Sir William Mitchell.

Rennie died in Adelaide on 8 January 1927.
