= James Hay Gosse =

Australian businessman (1876–1952)

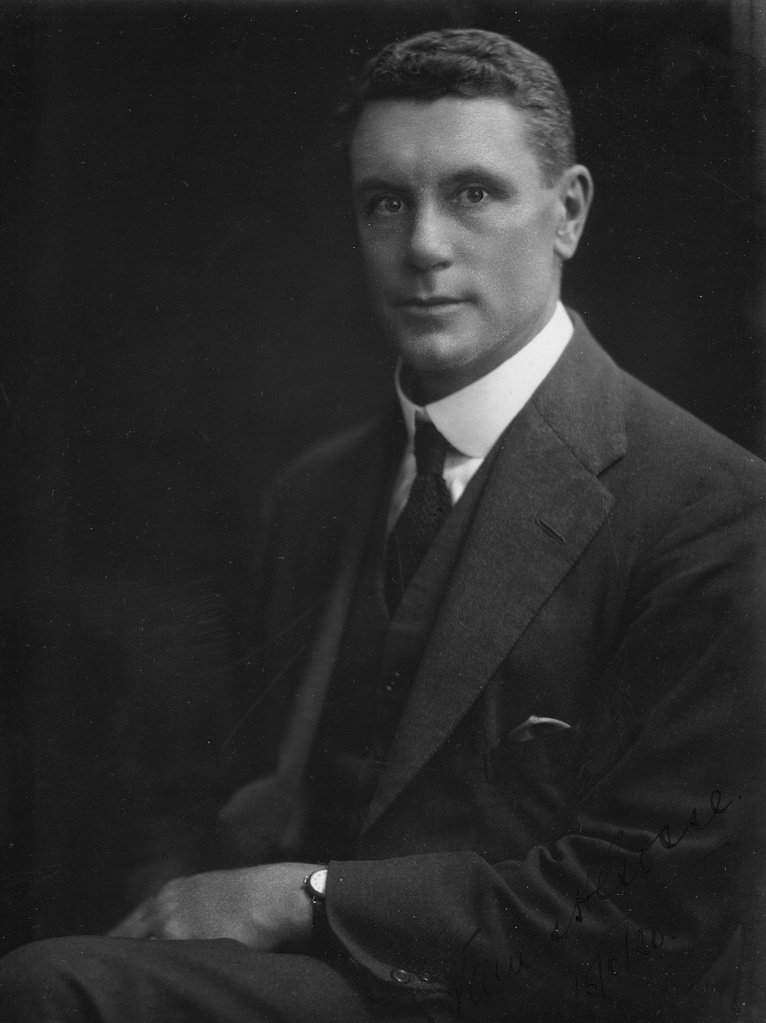
J. H. Gosse, circa 1900

Sir James Hay Gosse (21 December 1876 – 14 August 1952) was an Australian businessman, sportsman, and philanthropist. He was involved with a number of different companies and community organisations in and around Adelaide, South Australia.

== Early life ==
Gosse was born in Kent Town, Adelaide, the second of three children born to the explorer William Gosse and his wife Agnes (née Hay). His father died when he was four years old. His grandfathers were the surgeon William Gosse Sr. and the politician Alexander Hay. Gosse was educated at St Peter's College, Adelaide, leaving in 1896. He was a talented player of Australian rules football, playing for the Norwood Football Club between 1894 and 1905 as a ruckman. He won premierships in 1894 and 1904, and represented South Australia in four interstate games. He also excelled at rowing, representing his state between 1902 and 1905; he was later president of the Adelaide Rowing Club from 1924 to 1931.

== Business career ==
After leaving school, Gosse joined George Wills & Co. as a clerk. Rising through the ranks, he managed the company's Perth division from 1911 to 1918, and eventually became the managing director of the company as a whole, with which he was associated for over 50 years. Gosse also served on the boards of News Limited, the Executor Trustee & Agency Company of South Australia, JABAS, the Adelaide Steamship Company, and the Bank of Adelaide. He was chairman of the last two for periods, and also served as chairman of the Australian Association of British Manufacturers and president of the South Australian Chamber of Commerce.

== Community work ==
Gosse was president of the Norwood Football Club from 1920 to 1939 and president of the South Australian National Football League (SANFL) from 1945 until his death in 1952. He was a governor of his old school St Peter's College from 1917 to 1938, and served on the board of the South Australian Museum. Gosse had a keen interest in environmental matters, serving two terms as president of the Royal South Australian Zoological Society (1923 to 1931 and 1935 to 1947) and as president of the state government's Fauna and Flora Board from 1940 to 1952. In 1948, he donated 3,000 acres (1,200 ha) of land in the Coorong for conservation purposes. In the previous year's Birthday Honours he had been created a Knight Bachelor, "in recognition of public service in South Australia".

== Personal life ==
On 29 April 1908, Gosse married Joanna Lang Barr Smith, the daughter of the pastoralist Tom Elder Barr Smith. The couple had five children together. His daughter Mary married the politician and diplomat Sir Alick Downer; their son Alexander Downer also entered politics. A nephew, George Gosse, was a decorated soldier.
