= Helga Josephine Zinnbauer =

Australian community worker and librarian

- Born: Helga Josephine Alscher; 24 February 1909; Orsova, Austria-Hungary
- Died: 16 December 1980 (aged 71); Adelaide, Australia
- Occupations: Community worker, Librarian

Helga Josephine Zinnbauer, also known as Helga Freund-Zinnbauer, (24 February 1909 – 16 December 1980) was an Australian community worker and librarian.

Zinnbauer was born in Orsova, Austria-Hungary (now Orșova, Romania) to Otto Alscher, a journalist, and his wife Else Leopoldine, née Amon. She worked as a librarian in the Barr Smith Library from 1943 until her retirement in 1974. She died in Adelaide, South Australia. Her funeral was conducted by Johannes Biar, a Lutheran pastor and supporter of the work of the Zinnbauers.

Her husband was Alfred Freund-Zinnbauer, a Lutheran pastor.
