= Mary Downer =

Australian patron

Mary Downer, Lady Downer
- Born: Mary Isobel Gosse; 13 December 1924; Parkside, South Australia, Australia
- Died: 14 October 2014 (aged 89); London, England
- Spouse: Sir Alick Downer
- Children: Alexander Downer
- Parent(s): James Hay Gosse and Joanna Lang Gosse (nee Barr Smith)
- Relatives: Tom Elder Barr Smith (grandfather)

Mary Isobel Downer, Lady Downer (13 December 1924 – 14 October 2014) was South Australian patron, wife of federal MP and high commissioner Sir Alexander "Alick" Downer, and mother of Liberal Party leader, Australian Foreign Minister and high commissioner Alexander Downer.

== Early life ==
Mary Gosse was born on 13 December 1924. She and her four brothers were raised in Parkside, (an inner suburb of Adelaide) and was educated at Presbyterian Girls' College (now Seymour College), then a private Presbyterian Church of Australia (now Uniting Church) school for girls. Her father, Sir James Gosse, was a prominent Adelaide businessman and philanthropist, as was her grandfather Tom Elder Barr Smith. In 1943, during World War Two, at the age of 18, she enlisted in the Army. She joined the Searchlight Battalion, where she served as a truck driver in Western Australia, subsequently being discharged in March 1943 with the rank of Gunner. Mary Gosse married Alick Downer on 23 April 1947 at the Church of the Epiphany in Crafers.

== Later years ==
Downer moved to London with her husband in 1964 as he took up the post of Australian High Commissioner. She became involved with an Australian expatriate community, establishing the Chicken and Chablis Club, and became Lady Downer in 1965 when her husband was knighted.

Lady Downer was an active patron of the Mary Potter Foundation, from 1994. The foundation works to raise funds to support the work of the Mary Potter Hospice, operated by Calvary Health Care Adelaide, and to support the development of services to the terminally ill and their families by the Hospice through the provision of additional buildings, facilities, equipment and/or services. She was the primary patron of the Barossa Valley Music Festival in South Australia until its termination in 2005. An article on Lady Downer was featured in the Spring 2008 issue of Barossa Living.

== Death ==
Mary, Lady Downer, died on 14 October 2014, aged 89, in London, while visiting her son Alexander Downer, the incumbent Australian High Commissioner to the UK. Prime Minister Tony Abbott paid tribute to her, calling her a "person of substance and style". Her body was cremated at Mortlake Crematorium in London on 22 October 2014 after a service officiated by the Dean of Westminster.

== See also ==
- Downer family
