= Alfred Freund-Zinnbauer =

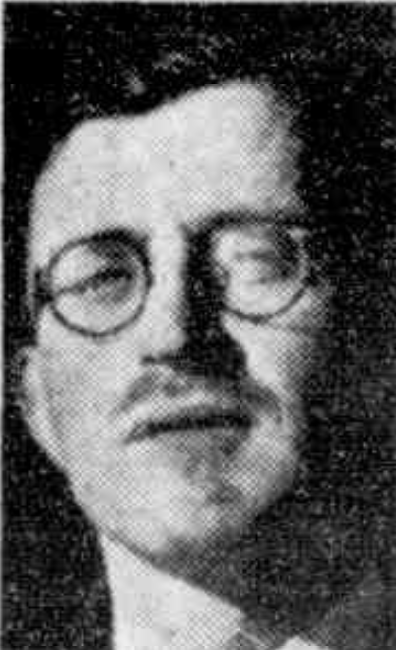
Alfred Freund-Zinnbauer

Alfred Freund-Zinnbauer MBE (26 June 1910 – 9 November 1978) was an Australian community worker, internee, Lutheran pastor and refugee. Zinnbauer was born in Vienna, Austro-Hungarian Empire (Austria) and died in Adelaide, South Australia. His wife was Helga Josephine Zinnbauer, a librarian.

In 1938, due to increasing anti-semitism in Austria, Freund-Zinnbauer decided to emigrate and contacted a fellow Lutheran pastor he knew in Adelaide. Upon his arrival in Australia in 1940, however, he was now considered an enemy alien and was interned in Tatura. In 1942, he was transferred to the Loveday Camp in rural South Australia, and was finally released in 1944 after being reclassified as a refugee.

After the war, he spent most of his time with the church assisting European immigrants settle into new lives in the Adelaide area. He died in 1978 and his wife in 1980.
