= John Jefferson Bray =

Australian judge (1912–1995)

The Honourable John Jefferson Bray AC QC

9th Chancellor of the University of Adelaide
- In office 1968–1983
- Preceded by: Sir Kenneth Wills
- Succeeded by: Dame Roma Mitchell

Chief Justice of South Australia
- In office 28 February 1967 – 28 November 1978
- Preceded by: Sir Mellis Napier
- Succeeded by: Len King

Personal details
- Born: 16 September 1912 Adelaide, South Australia
- Died: 26 June 1995 (aged 82)
- Education: University of Adelaide

John Jefferson Bray, AC QC (16 September 1912 – 26 June 1995) was an Australian lawyer, judge, academic, university administrator, Crown officer, and poet. From 1967 to 1978, he served as Chief Justice of the Supreme Court of South Australia.

== Early life and parents ==
Bray was born in Adelaide, South Australia on 16 September 1912, the elder son of Harry Midwinter Bray (1879–1965), an Adelaide stockbroker, and his wife, Gertrude Eleanore Stow (members of whose family were Congregationalist missionaries in South Australia). His father's family had a history of involvement in South Australian politics and current affairs: Bray's grandfather was the Honourable Sir John Cox Bray, a former Premier of South Australia. On his mother's side, Bray claimed a collateral relationship to the third U.S. president, Thomas Jefferson.

== Education ==
Bray was educated at the state school at Sevenhill in the Clare Valley; at St Peter's College, Adelaide; and at the University of Adelaide, where he earned a B.A. in 1932, an LL.B.(Hons.) in 1933 and an LL.D. in 1937. He was granted an Honorary Doctorate in 1983.

== Legal career ==
Bray trained as a lawyer and was admitted to the South Australian Bar in 1933, being appointed Queen's Counsel in 1957.

He was acting lecturer in jurisprudence at the University of Adelaide for the years 1941, 1943, 1945 (due to his being medically unfit to serve in World War II owing to extremely poor eyesight), and in 1951.

He served as a lecturer in Legal History at the University of Adelaide from 1957 to 1958, and then as a lecturer in Roman Law from 1959 until 1966. He was appointed Chief Justice of the Supreme Court of South Australia on 28 February 1967 and served until his retirement from the judiciary on 28 November 1978. Appointed by then Attorney-General of South Australia, Don Dunstan, he was appointed directly without having first served as a judge, which was an unusual occurrence.

Bray was appointed Chancellor of the University of Adelaide in 1968, and also served as Deputy to the Lieutenant-Governor of South Australia from 1968 until retirement.

== Other activities ==
Bray was an active member of the Libraries Board of South Australia between 1944 and 1989, the longest-serving Libraries Board member until that point. After he retired, the State Library of South Australia named its reference section as the Bray Reference Library, a name given to a suite of rooms when the library was redeveloped in 2001.

He was vice-president of the South Australian branch of the Fellowship of Australian Writers, and was closely involved with the organisation of the first three Festival of Arts Writers' Weeks (1960, 1962, 1964), with his first volume of poetry launched at the second Writers' Week in 1962.

He was at the inaugural meeting of Friendly Street Poets, and remained an active member and contributor to the society's annual anthologies, the Friendly Street Reader. The Satura Prize is a poetry prize funded by a bequest from his estate and awarded by Friendly Streets.

Bray's first book of poetry was published in 1962.

== Honours, recognition and legacy ==
Bray was made a Companion of the Order of Australia in 1979, and is said, by his younger brother, Dr Robert Stow Bray, to have refused a knighthood. He described his views as "æsthetic - traditional; social - emancipated; political - fluctuating" and his philosophies as "sceptical, some tendencies to Platonism". He was elected an Honorary Fellow of the Australian Academy of the Humanities in 1991.

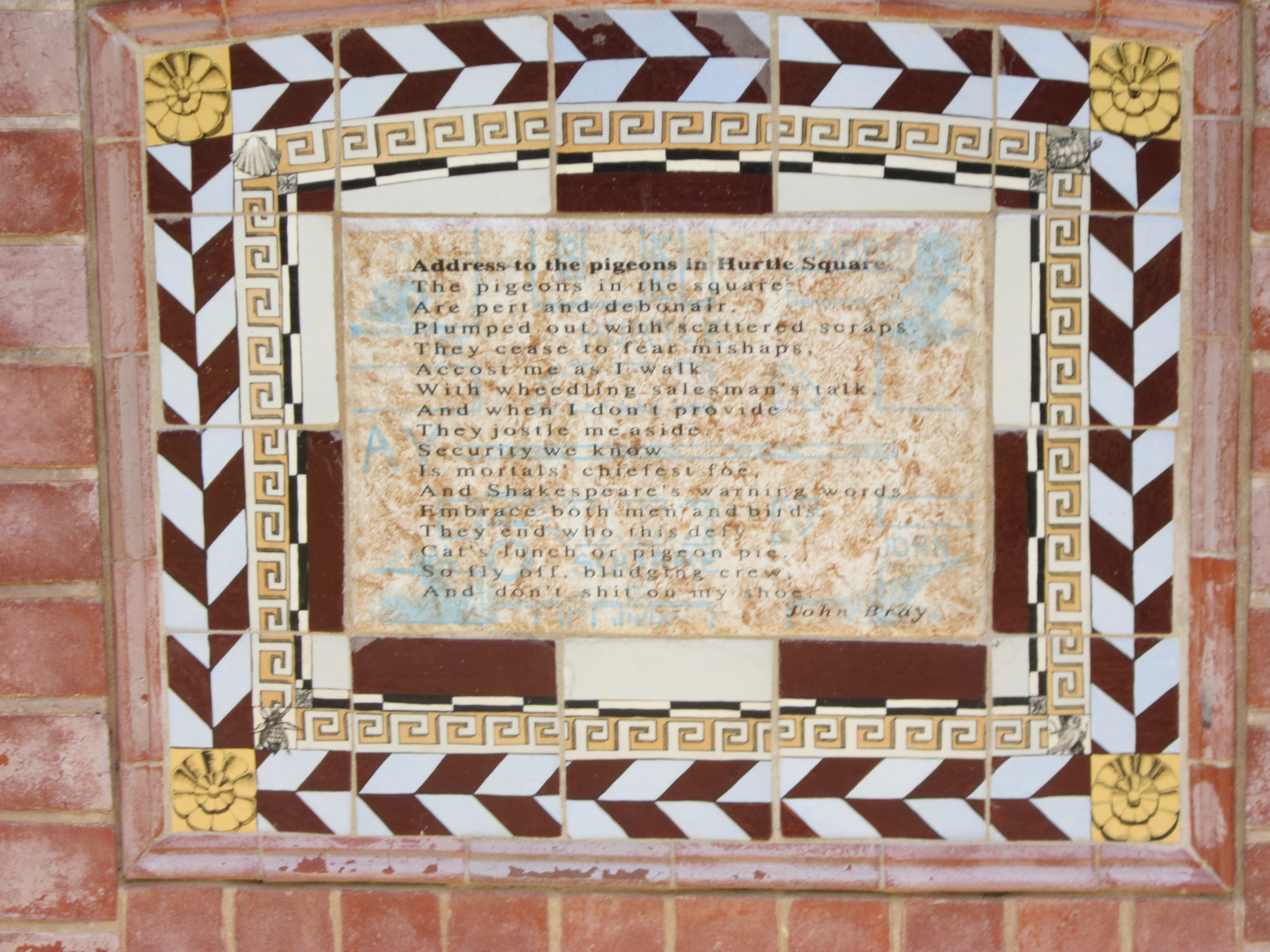
"Address to the pigeons in Hurtle Square", a poem by Bray, features on the western face of the John Jefferson Bray Memorial Fountain in Hurtle Square, Adelaide, where he once lived.

The John Bray Poetry Award, awarded biennially since 1986 as part of the Adelaide Festival, was so named to honour his distinguished services to Australian poetry.

The John Jefferson Bray Memorial in Hurtle Square, Adelaide, was commissioned by the Adelaide City Council in 1994.

Bray died on 26 June 1995 in Adelaide.

There is a bronze bust of Bray, sculpted by local sculptor John Dowie, in the State Library.

== Selected publications ==
Bray's publications reflected his interests, which he listed as "poetry, history, classics". As author, these included:

- Poems (Melbourne, Cheshire Press, 1962)
- Poems 1961-1971 (Brisbane, Jacaranda Press, 1972)
- Poems 1972-1979 (1979)
- Bay of Salamis and other Poems (1986)
- Satura: Selected Poetry and Prose (1988)
- Seventy Seven (Adelaide, Wakefield Press, 1990)

He co-edited No. 7 Friendly Street Poetry Reader (1983) with Jan Owen.

He wrote two plays:

- Papinian (performed 1955)
- The Women of Troy (performed 1966)

He also made contributions to:

- Well and Truly Tried (1982), a festschrift for Sir Richard Eggleston
- Adelaide Law School Centenary Essays (1983)
- Australian Law Journal

== See also ==
- Judiciary of Australia

Legal offices
Preceded by Sir Mellis Napier	Chief Justice of South Australia; 1967–1978	Succeeded by Len King
Academic offices
Preceded by Sir Kenneth Wills	Chancellor of the University of Adelaide; 1968–1983	Succeeded by Dame Roma Mitchell
