= Alexander Downer =

Australian politician (born 1951)

The Honourable Alexander Downer AC
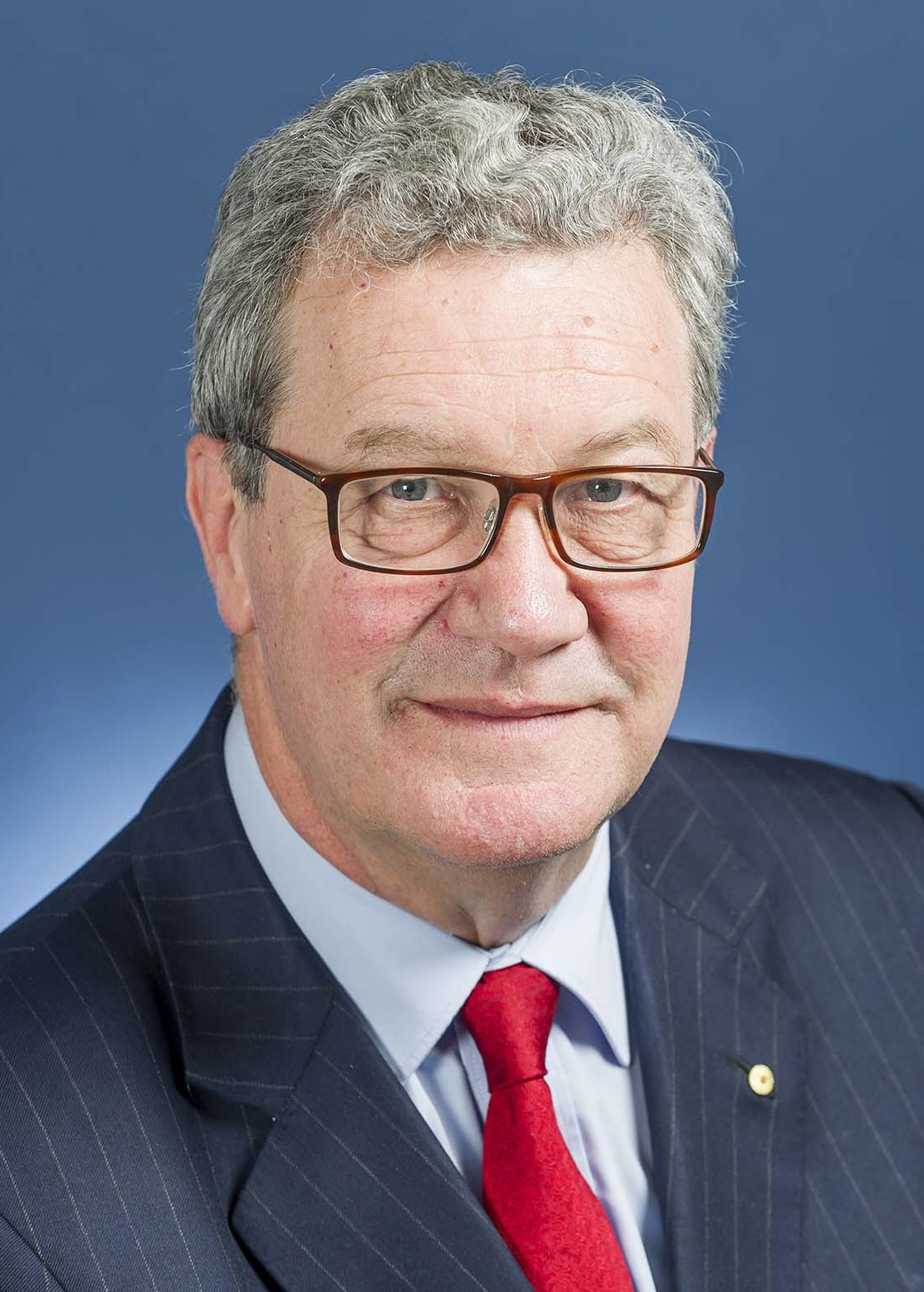
- Official portrait, 2014

Australian High Commissioner to the United Kingdom
- In office 27 June 2014 – 27 April 2018
- Nominated by: Tony Abbott
- Minister: Julie Bishop
- Preceded by: Mike Rann
- Succeeded by: George Brandis

Minister for Foreign Affairs
- In office 11 March 1996 – 3 December 2007
- Prime Minister: John Howard
- Preceded by: Gareth Evans
- Succeeded by: Stephen Smith

Leader of the Opposition
- In office 23 May 1994 – 30 January 1995
- Prime Minister: Paul Keating
- Deputy: Peter Costello
- Preceded by: John Hewson
- Succeeded by: John Howard

Leader of the Liberal Party
- In office 23 May 1994 – 30 January 1995
- Deputy: Peter Costello
- Preceded by: John Hewson
- Succeeded by: John Howard

Member of the Australian Parliament for Mayo
- In office 1 December 1984 – 14 July 2008
- Preceded by: Constituency established
- Succeeded by: Jamie Briggs

Personal details
- Born: Alexander John Gosse Downer; 9 September 1951 (age 75) Adelaide, South Australia
- Party: Liberal
- Spouse: Nicola Robinson (m. 1978)
- Children: 4
- Parents: Alick Downer; Mary Gosse
- Education: Geelong Grammar School; Radley College
- Alma mater: Newcastle University
- Occupation: Executive director (Australian Chamber of Commerce and Industry); Bank economist (Bank of New South Wales)
- Profession: Diplomat; Politician
- Downer's voice Downer talking about the Commonwealth of Nations; Recorded 20 August 2025

Alexander John Gosse Downer (born 9 September 1951) is an Australian former politician and diplomat who served as the Minister for Foreign Affairs from 1996 to 2007, and was a member of parliament (MP) for the South Australian division of Mayo from 1984 to 2008.

Downer was born in Adelaide, the son of Sir Alick Downer and the grandson of Sir John Downer. After periods working for the Bank of New South Wales and with the diplomatic service, he was appointed executive director of the Australian Chamber of Commerce in 1983. He also served as an advisor to Liberal leaders Malcolm Fraser and Andrew Peacock. Downer was elected to parliament at the 1984 federal election, winning the Division of Mayo in South Australia. He was added to the opposition frontbench in 1987.

After the Coalition lost the 1993 election, John Hewson's position as leader of the Liberal Party came into question. Downer successfully challenged him for the leadership in 1994, thus becoming Leader of the Opposition. He initially had high approval ratings, but after a series of gaffes, resigned from the leadership in 1995 and was replaced by John Howard. He was the first Liberal leader to fail to lead the party to an election, and remains the shortest-serving leader in party history.

When the Howard government came to power in 1996, Downer was made Minister for Foreign Affairs. He served until the government's defeat in 2007, making him the longest-serving foreign minister in Australian history. Downer left politics in 2008, and was subsequently named Special Adviser to the UN Secretary-General on Cyprus. He held that post until 2014, when he was appointed High Commissioner to the United Kingdom by the Abbott government.

== Early life and education ==
The Downer family has a long history in South Australian politics. Their earliest ancestors were Mary Ann Downer (1792–1868) and her son Henry Downer (1811–1870), his great-grandfather, who travelled from England in 1862 aboard the Eden, settling in Adelaide. Downer's father was Minister for Immigration in the Menzies government and later served as High Commissioner to the United Kingdom. His paternal grandfather, Sir John Downer, served twice as Premier of South Australia in the late 19th century, and was later one of the inaugural members of the Australian Senate. Downer's maternal grandfather was the businessman and philanthropist James Hay Gosse, whose father was the explorer William Gosse.

Alexander Downer was born on 9 September 1951 in Adelaide, South Australia, when the family were living in the Adelaide Hills home built by his father, Arbury Park. He is the third of four children born to Sir Alexander "Alick" Downer and Mary Downer (née Gosse); he has three sisters.

Downer was educated at Geelong Grammar School in Australia, then in England (while his father was High Commissioner) at Radley College between 1964 and 1970. He subsequently completed a Bachelor of Arts in politics and economics at Newcastle University in Newcastle upon Tyne.

== Early career ==
From 1975 to 1976, he worked as an economist for the Bank of New South Wales, before entering the Australian Diplomatic Service, where he served until 1982. Some of Downer's time in the Diplomatic Service was spent at a posting in Brussels, where he undertook a French language training course. He then worked as an adviser to the then Liberal Prime Minister, Malcolm Fraser and subsequent Leader of the Federal Opposition Andrew Peacock.

Prior to the 1981 by-election Downer unsuccessfully sought Liberal Party preselection for the seat of Boothby, and in 1982 for the state seat of Bragg. From 1983 to 1984, he also served as the Executive Director of the Australian Chamber of Commerce. In 1984, he was finally preselected and was elected to the federal Parliament as Liberal member for Mayo, in the Adelaide Hills in South Australia. He held this seat until his resignation from Parliament in 2008.

== Opposition leader ==
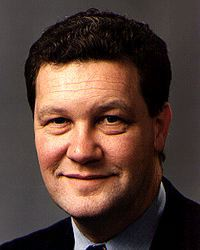
Downer during the 1990s.

Downer held a number of positions on the opposition front bench from 1987 onwards. When the Liberals unexpectedly lost the 1993 election to Prime Minister Paul Keating, after the election Downer became Shadow Treasurer replacing Peter Reith who had resigned from the portfolio. During this time, Downer began to be talked of as a possible leader as John Hewson was seen as weak following the 1993 election defeat. In May 1994 Downer succeeded Hewson as Liberal party leader after defeating him in a leadership spill which Hewson initiated. Downer was the first South Australian to lead the party, as well as the first South Australian to lead the non-Labor side since Federation.

As Liberal leader, Downer initially attracted record levels of public support, even when incumbent Prime Minister Paul Keating launched a series of attacks on Downer's privileged background. Then aged 43, he was perceived as a fresh-faced alternative to a government in its twelfth year of power.

Several weeks after becoming leader Downer's support base was quickly eroded, however, by a series of embarrassing public blunders. One was the emergence of a 1987 speech to the far-right Australian League of Rights. Another was the sacking of John Hewson from the shadow ministry in August 1994. A damaging incident emerged from a formal dinner attended by Downer. While promoting the Liberal slogan "The Things That Matter", in a reference to abusing husbands, Downer quipped that the party's domestic violence policy would accordingly be named "The Things That Batter". Downer also found it difficult to handle the gulf between monarchists and republicans in his own party but resolved the dispute by promising to establish a constitutional convention to consider the issue. By the end of 1994, his approval ratings had dwindled to 34 percent after being as high as 53 percent.

Another event in 1994 that would spell the end of Downer's leadership was his decision for the Coalition to support the Keating government's sexual privacy legislation. The issue divided the Coalition with several MPs and Senators either voting against the legislation or abstaining from it.

On 9 January 1995, internal Liberal Party polling showed that with Downer as leader, the Coalition had a slim chance of holding its marginal seats in the next election, let alone of winning government. On 11 January, Downer launched a major policy statement with ten policy commitments and criticised Liberals he saw as undermining his leadership. Downer negotiated in mid-January with now back-bencher Hewson, but this resulted in Hewson publicly declaring he wanted the shadow Treasury portfolio which meant Downer would have to sack deputy Liberal leader Peter Costello from the position to give the job to Hewson. On 30 January 1995, he resigned as Liberal Leader and John Howard was elected unopposed to replace him. Downer pledged his support to Howard and said he would "kneecap" anyone who undermined Howard's second attempt at winning the prime ministership.

With a tenure of just over eight months, Downer is to date the shortest-serving leader of the federal Liberal Party. He is also, along with Brendan Nelson and Sussan Ley, one of three federal Liberal leaders never to lead the party into an election. On opposition leadership, he said in 2008, "The moment when I wanted to [leave] was just about the first day I started in the job. There was many a time from the first day onwards when I thought to myself, How the hell can I get out of this?"

== Minister for Foreign Affairs ==
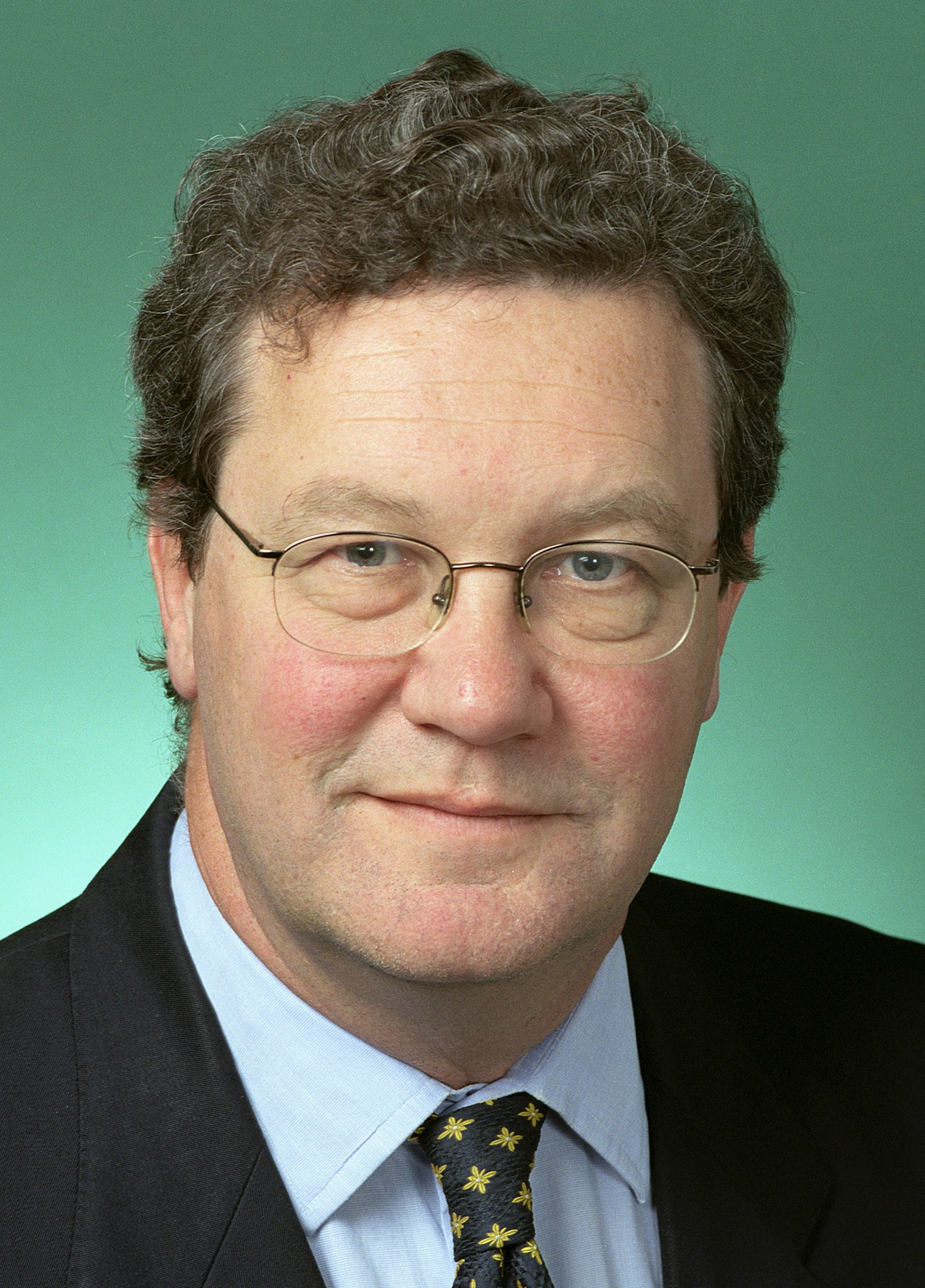
Official portrait, 2003

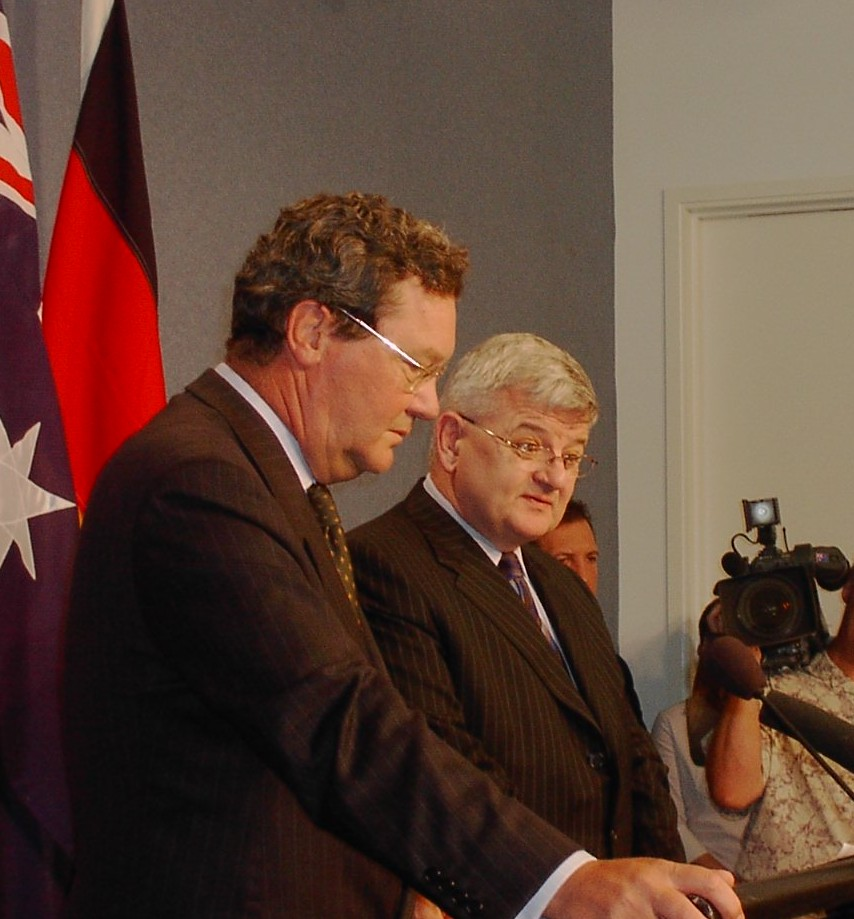
Downer with former German Foreign Minister Joschka Fischer at Parliament House, Canberra, February 2005

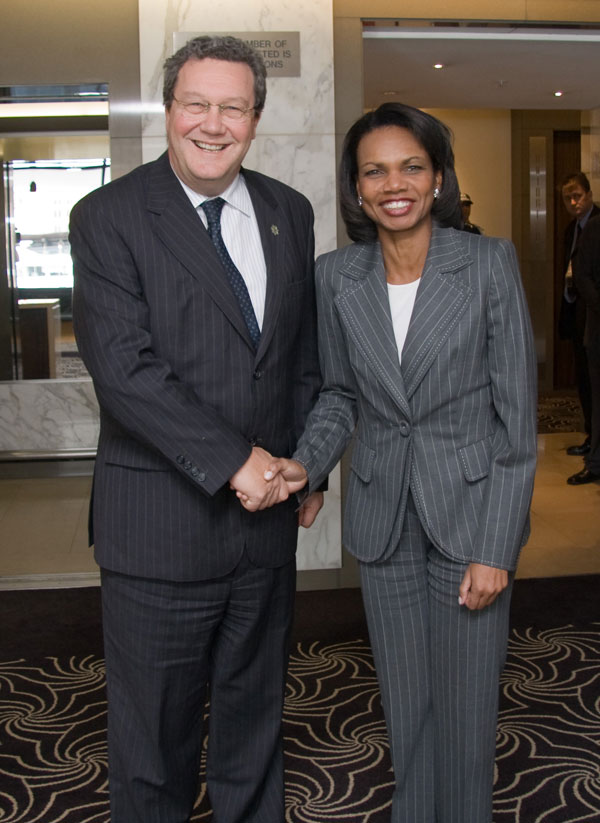
Downer with U.S. Secretary of State Condoleezza Rice in 2007.

Given choice of cabinet position in the incoming Howard government elected in March 1996, Downer became Minister for Foreign Affairs, a position he held until 3 December 2007. He became the longest-serving Foreign Minister of Australia on 20 December 2004.

One of Downer's earliest initiatives as Foreign Minister was to work with New Zealand to broker a peace agreement in Bougainville, Papua New Guinea, which ended a long running civil conflict.

In 1996, Downer took the Comprehensive Nuclear Test Ban Treaty to the United Nations General Assembly where it was embraced by most members of the world body. Pakistan, India and North Korea were among those who failed to ratify the treaty and went ahead in developing nuclear weapons capability. In 1999, the U.S. Senate rejected ratification of the treaty. Downer stated

It's pretty hard to say on the one hand that we feel very strongly about Pakistani and Indian nuclear testing and on the other hand the U.S. Senate won't ratify the ... treaty ... The last thing the United States wants to see is a resumption of nuclear testing or the proliferation of nuclear weapons – and it is the last thing Australia wants to see. By refusing to ratify this treaty, the United States Senate has done a lot to undermine the arms control agenda that the international community, including Australia, has been working on.

However, subsequent policies of the Howard government, including export of uranium to India, and general support for the unilateralist approach of the Bush Administration were seen as undermining the Comprehensive Nuclear Test Ban Treaty and the Nuclear Nonproliferation Treaty.

In 1999, Downer assisted the United Nations to hold a referendum in East Timor and in negotiating the entry of the INTERFET peace keeping force into East Timor.

In 2003, ASIS installed listening devices in the Palace of Government in Dili, East Timor, and later Downer signed a controversial agreement with the government of East Timor for mining of gas and oil reserves in the Timor Gap. The agreement was criticised as unfair to East Timor and attracted a bipartisan letter of reproach from 50 members of the United States Congress. The reserves were closer to East Timor than Australia but claimed by Australia on the basis of a treaty made with General Suharto in 1989.

As Minister for Foreign Affairs, Downer played a role in the diplomatic dispute known as the Tampa affair in 2001 in which Australia denied permission for the MV Tampa to dock at Christmas Island, having picked up a number of asylum seekers trying to get to Australia by boat. Downer also played a role in the subsequent negotiation of the "Pacific Solution" in which Australia held asylum seekers off-shore in foreign jurisdictions.

In 2003, Downer was accused of not passing on intelligence reports he received before the 2002 Bali bombings. He countered that the warnings were not specific enough to warrant their further release to the Australian public.

Downer supported Australia's participation in the Iraq War. He argued that Iraq, the Middle East and the world would be better off without the regime of Saddam Hussein and he defended the claim that weapons of mass destruction would be found in Iraq.

In August 2004, he made the claim based on official assessment reports that North Korea's Taepo Dong ballistic missile had a range sufficient to reach Sydney, a view disputed by some.

In 2005, Australian members of the spiritual group Falun Gong launched action against Downer in the ACT Supreme Court alleging that his department had unfairly limited their freedom of expression.

The Department of Foreign Affairs and Trade under Downer was accused by Chinese diplomat and defector Chen Yonglin of closely collaborating with the Chinese Embassy in Canberra, even to the extent of "giving suggestions to the Chinese Government on how to handle difficult political cases". Downer was accused of pursuing an unduly strong pro-China policy and failing to address human rights violations adequately.

In March 2006, Downer said the Australian Government opposed selling uranium to India. Downer was quoted as saying "Australia had no plans to change a policy which rules out uranium sales to countries like India which have not signed the UN's nuclear Non-Proliferation Treaty (NPT)." Following the conclusion of the US-India nuclear agreement, the Australian Government said it would export uranium to civil nuclear facilities in India subject to several conditions, one of which was the conclusion of a bilateral safeguards agreement.

In April 2006, he appeared before the Cole Inquiry regarding the oil for food scandal and testified that he was ignorant of the huge kickbacks paid to the Iraq government, despite claims by the opposition Labor Party that many warnings had been received by his department from various sources. The Cole inquiry made it clear Downer had been unaware of the kickbacks.

In July 2006, it was claimed that six months before the 2003 invasion of Iraq, Downer had argued that participating in the invasion would be commercially beneficial for Australia. Downer expressed concern that the war might lead to America taking all of Australia's wheat market.

In August 2006, it was claimed by a former weapons inspector, Dr John Gee, that Downer had in 2004 suppressed accurate and provable information that the search for weapons of mass destruction in Iraq was fundamentally flawed.

As Foreign Minister, Downer initially supported the United States Government's incarceration of two Australian citizens, David Hicks and Mamdouh Habib, in the Guantanamo Bay detention camp. Downer later told the US he wanted both released if they were not to be charged. On that basis, Habib was released and Hicks charged.

A major challenge for Downer was handling relations with Australia's most important neighbour, Indonesia. Downer negotiated the 2006 Lombok Treaty to put security relations between the two countries on a stable footing, built bilateral co-operation to fight terrorism, people smuggling and illegal fishing. One of the recent difficulties which erupted between Australia and Indonesia was when Australia accepted a boatload of asylum seekers from Indonesia's Papua province in March 2006.

In September 2007, on the sidelines of the 2007 APEC Conference in Sydney, Downer indicated that Australia planned to launch bilateral ministerial-level security talks with the People's Republic of China. Downer also stated, "China is a good partner of Australia. Whatever the differences there are between us in terms of our political systems, human rights issues, China is a very important part of the strategic architecture, the security architecture of the Asia-Pacific region and it's important we have good forums to discuss any issues of that kind with them."

== Post-parliamentary career ==
Alexander Downer in 2025 at Trinity College

Following the Howard government's defeat at the 2007 federal election, Downer declined to make a comeback to the leadership and to serve on the Opposition frontbench, amid widespread speculation that he would resign his seat and leave federal politics, having spent over a decade in government. He subsequently resigned from Parliament on 14 July 2008 and took a consulting job with Woodside Energy. His resignation triggered a by-election in the seat of Mayo.

On 3 July 2008, the University of Adelaide announced Downer's appointment as Visiting Professor of Politics and International Trade in the School of History and Politics, including contributions to teaching and research, and work with the University's Institute for International Trade. He was also the vice chairman at Carnegie Mellon University, South Australia.

At about the same time, he went into partnership with Ian Smith (a former Liberal Party advisor) and Nick Bolkus (a former Labor Senator for South Australia) in a boutique consultancy firm, Bespoke Approach.

Also in 2008, Downer discussed the possibility of working as a United Nations envoy to Cyprus with the UN Secretary-General to help revive the peace process. The appointment received the support of the Rudd government, via the Foreign Minister Stephen Smith, and it took effect on 14 July 2008.

He resigned in February 2014 to take up the post of Australia's High Commissioner in London where he replaced former South Australian Labor premier, Mike Rann. On 10 May 2016, according to The New York Times, Downer and Erika Thompson met with George Papadopoulos in London and information from this meeting caused the FBI to open a counterintelligence investigation into Russia's attempts to disrupt the 2016 US Presidential election, and whether there was any involvement by Donald Trump's associates. Downer told The Australian in a 28 April 2018 interview that "nothing [Papadopoulos] said in their meeting indicated Trump himself had been conspiring with the Russians to collect information on Hillary Clinton". Downer remained as High Commissioner until 27 April 2018 when he was succeeded by George Brandis.

He has had a number of board appointments, including the Advisory Board of British strategic intelligence and advisory firm Hakluyt & Company, merchant bankers Cappello Capital Corp., the Adelaide Symphony Orchestra, Huawei in Australia, and the board of Lakes Oil. Downer has said that Huawei should not be considered a potential national security risk. Downer's comments are at odds with an October 2012 US congressional panel's findings that have deemed Huawei a security threat to the US and other nations.

A longtime supporter of Australians for Constitutional Monarchy, Downer has played a leading role opposing moves to replace the Monarch with a president.

In 2015, he was recommended by British and Australian officials as a possible compromise candidate for Commonwealth Secretary-General but Baroness Patricia Scotland was ultimately elected to the post at the 2015 Commonwealth Heads of Government Meeting.

In 2017, it was announced that Downer would join UK think tank Policy Exchange as Chair of Trustees. In June 2018, Downer became the Executive Chairman of the International School of Government at King's College, London. He is a non-executive director of CQS and of Yellow Cake plc.

In 2018, he was named to Tilray's International Advisory Board. As of 2019, Downer is Executive Chair of the International School for Government at King's College London.

In 2019 and 2020, Downer wrote regular columns for the Australian Financial Review. In his column on 1 November 2020 discussing the forthcoming US election (held on 3 November), he declared that if he was eligible to vote in the US (which, he explained, he was not), although "there's no perfect choice", he would vote for Donald Trump.

In 2021, Downer joined ASX-listed mining company Ironbark Zinc as non-executive director.

== Honours ==
In January 2001, he was awarded the Centenary Medal.

Downer was appointed a Companion of the Order of Australia in the 2013 Australia Day Honours. In the same year, he was awarded an Honorary Doctorate from the University of South Australia.

== Personal life ==
Downer is married to Nicky (née Nicola Rosemary Robinson), who is a prominent figure in the arts community and was appointed a Member of the Order of Australia in 2005 for her service to the arts. They have four children, including Georgina Downer.

He is an enthusiast of V8 car racing and holds a CAMS racing licence.

In mid-2014, the Downers sold Brampton House in Mount George, though they intended to return to South Australia in 2017.

== In popular culture ==
Alexander Downer was portrayed by Richard Binsley in the 2020 miniseries The Comey Rule and Francis Greenslade in the 2014 film Schapelle. He was also referenced in Kath and Kim.

He was featured in the musical Keating!, played by Cam Rogers (2006 Sydney run) and Casey Bennetto (2005 Melbourne run).

== Electoral history ==
=== Federal ===
Election year	Electorate	Party	Votes	FP%		2PP%		Result
1984	Mayo	Liberal	31,131	52.40%	▼3.5	60.50%	▼ -1.8	First
1987	Mayo	Liberal	35,040	54.00%	▲1.6	62.60%	▲2.2	First
1990	Mayo	Liberal	39,037	52.50%	▼1.5	61.60%	▼1.1	First
1993	Mayo	Liberal	42,647	53.98%	▲3.43	60.60%	▼1.0	First
1996	Mayo	Liberal	46,920	57.02%	▲3.04	65.16%	▲4.56	First
1998	Mayo	Liberal	38,246	45.64%	▼11.37	51.74%	▼13.42	First
2001	Mayo	Liberal	41,529	52.76%	▲6.45	62.87%	▲2.97	First
2004	Mayo	Liberal	44,520	53.64%	▲0.01	61.81%	▼2.49	First
2007	Mayo	Liberal	45,893	51.08%	▼2.56	57.06%	▼6.53	First

== See also ==
- Downer family
- Political families of Australia
- List of people from Adelaide
- High Commission of Australia, London

Parliament of Australia
New division	Member for Mayo; 1984–2008	Succeeded by Jamie Briggs
Political offices
Preceded by Stan Collard	Shadow Minister for the Arts, Heritage and the Environment; 1987	Succeeded by Chris Puplick as Shadow Minister for Environment and Arts
Preceded by James Porter as Shadow Minister for Housing and Public Administration	Shadow Minister for Housing and Small Business; 1988–1989	Succeeded by Wilson Tuckey
Preceded by Charles Blunt as Shadow Minister for Trade and Resources	Shadow Minister for Trade and Trade Negotiations; 1990–1992	Succeeded by Andrew Peacock as Shadow Minister for Trade
Preceded by Peter Durack	Shadow Minister for Defence; 1992–1993	Succeeded by Robert Hill as Shadow Minister for Defence and Public Administration
Preceded by Peter Reith	Shadow Treasurer of Australia; 1993–1994	Succeeded by Peter Costello
Preceded by John Hewson	Leader of the Opposition of Australia; 1994–1995	Succeeded by John Howard
Preceded by Peter Reith	Shadow Minister for Foreign Affairs; 1995–1996	Succeeded by Laurie Brereton
Preceded by Gareth Evans	Minister for Foreign Affairs; 1996–2007	Succeeded by Stephen Smith
Party political offices
Preceded by John Hewson	Leader of the Liberal Party of Australia; 1994–1995	Succeeded by John Howard
Diplomatic posts
Preceded by Mike Rann	High commissioner of Australia to the United Kingdom; 2014–2018	Succeeded by George Brandis
