= Robert Barr Smith =

Australian businessman (1824–1915)

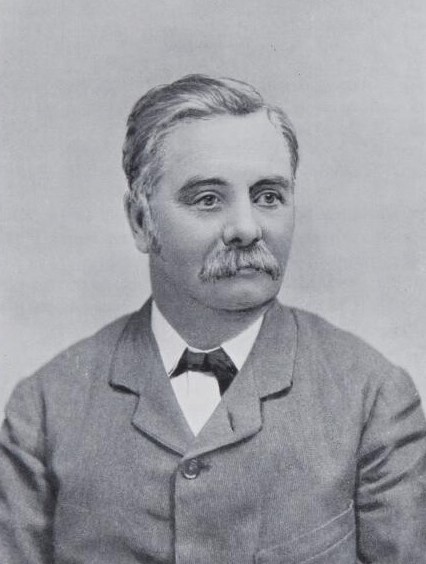
- Barr Smith in 1901
- Born: 4 February 1824; Lochwinnoch, Renfrewshire, Scotland
- Died: 20 November 1915 (aged 91)
- Education: University of Glasgow
- Occupations: Businessman; philanthropist
- Spouse: Joanna Elder (m. 1856; died 1915)
- Children: 3; including Tom Elder
- Relatives: Thomas Elder (brother-in-law); William Mitchell (son-in-law)

Robert Barr Smith (4 February 1824 – 20 November 1915) was an Australian businessman and philanthropist in Adelaide, South Australia. He was a partner in Elder Smith and Company from 1863 (now Elders Limited).

== Early life and education ==
Smith was born at Lochwinnoch, Renfrewshire, Scotland, the son of the Rev. Dr Robert Smith, a Church of Scotland minister, and his wife Marjory, née Barr.

He studied for a time at the University of Glasgow.

Between 5 November 1880 and 16 July 1897, Barr Smith served as the honorary consul for Sweden–Norway in Adelaide.

== Personal life, death and legacy ==
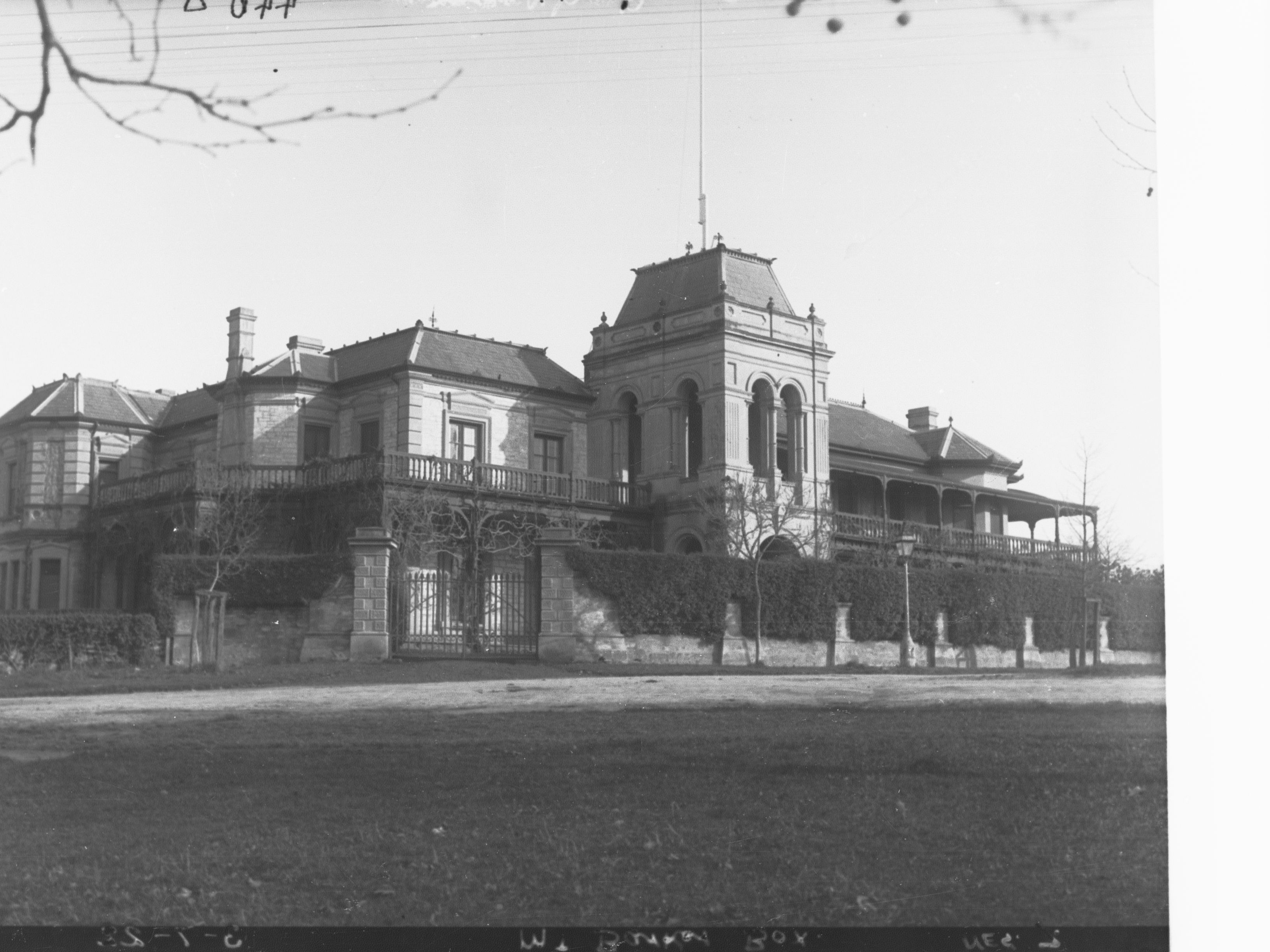
Auchendarroch House

In 1856 Barr Smith married Joanna Elder, sister of Sir Thomas Elder, also Scottish migrants to the colony.

In 1878, the couple paid £3000 for a piece of land in Mount Barker that included the Oakfield Hotel (opened 1860, owned by Lachlan MacFarlane). They planned and built a 30-roomed mansion in French Renaissance style around the existing hotel, to be used as their family's summer home. They later assigned the name Auchendarroch (later known as Auchendarroch House), which originates from the Scottish Gaelic language word for "holy place of the oaks", and proceeded to plant a lot of oak trees on the property. They assigned 3 acres (1.2 ha) each for an orchard and a garden, with hedges planted around the whole property. The garden included large lawns and many English trees, including cedars, chestnuts, maples, conifers, and around 50 oak trees. It also had flower beds and vegetable gardens, with the produce given away in the community.

Barr Smith died of "senile decay" on 20 November 1915, and Joanna died in 1919. Auchendarroch was sold in 1921 to the Memorial Hospital and used as a convalescent home. It was later acquired by the Wallis family, owners of Wallis Cinemas.

== Family ==
Joanna and Robert were survived by a son and three daughters.

- Brother-in-law: Sir Thomas Elder (1818–1897)
- Son: Tom Elder Barr Smith (1863–1941)
- Grandson: Sir Tom Elder Barr Smith (1904–1968)
- Third daughter: Joanna Fitzgerald Barr Smith (1866 – ) married George Charles Hawker, jun. (c. 1854 – 15 February 1889), son of George Charles Hawker, in 1886.
- Fourth daughter: Marjory Erlistoun Barr Smith (1868 – 3 August 1913) married William Mitchell on 18 January 1900

== See also ==
- Barr Smith Library
