= Tom Elder Barr Smith =

South Australian pastoralist and philanthropist

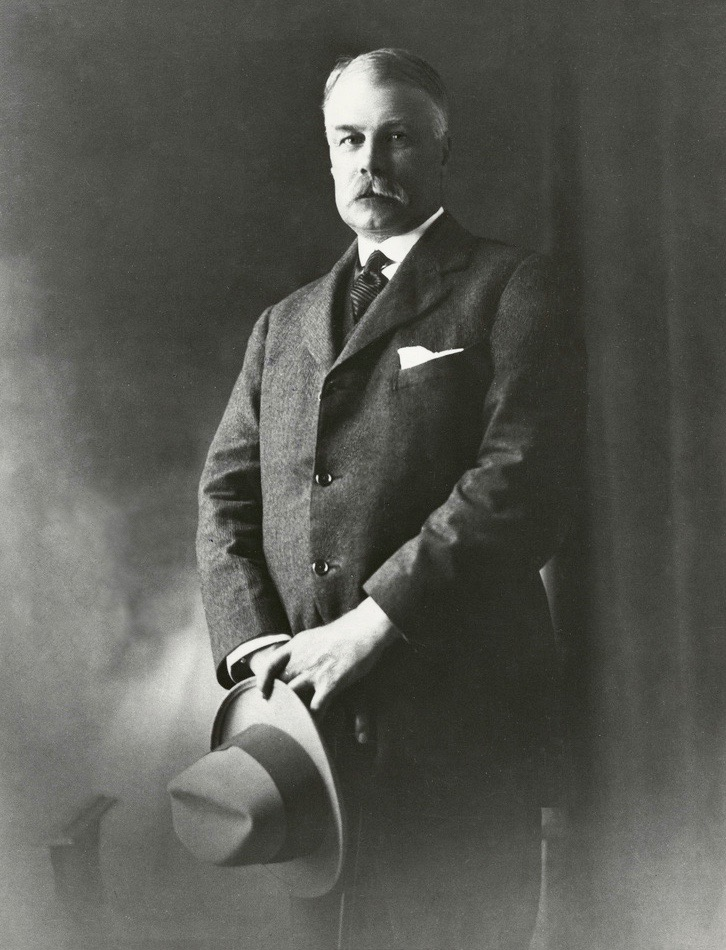
- Barr Smith, c. 1914
- Born: 8 December 1863; Woodville, South Australia, Australia
- Died: 26 November 1941 (aged 77)
- Occupations: Pastoralist; philanthropist
- Spouse: Mary Mitchell (m. 1886; died 1941)
- Children: 2
- Parent: Robert Barr Smith (father)
- Relatives: Thomas Elder (uncle); Alexander Lang Elder (uncle); James Hay Gosse (son-in-law); Mary Downer (granddaughter)

Tom Barr Smith was born in Woodville, South Australia, the son of Robert Barr Smith, and his wife Joanna Lang, née Elder.

On 5 May 1886 he married Mary Isabel Mitchell, at St Andrew's Church, Walkerville.

In 1917, Barr Smith subdivided his estate, which became the Adelaide suburb of Torrens Park.

In 1928 he gave £30,000 to the University of Adelaide to enable the building of the Barr Smith Library.

His interests included competing in car rallies. A steam locomotive, now preserved in the National Railway Museum, Port Adelaide, was named after him in 1926.

There is a plaque in his honour on the Jubilee 150 Walkway.

== Family ==
- Father: Robert Barr Smith (1824–1915)
- Mother: Joanna Elder - sister of Sir Thomas Elder
- Uncles: Sir Thomas Elder (1818–1897), William Elder (1813–1882), Alexander Lang Elder (1815–1885) and George Elder (1816–1897)
- Daughter: Joanna Lang Barr Smith, Lady Gosse (1886–1965) married Sir James Hay Gosse (1876–1952) on 29 April 1908, at St. Andrew's, Walkerville, South Australia.
- Son: Sir Tom Elder Barr Smith (1904–1968)
