= Geoffrey Giles =

Australian politician

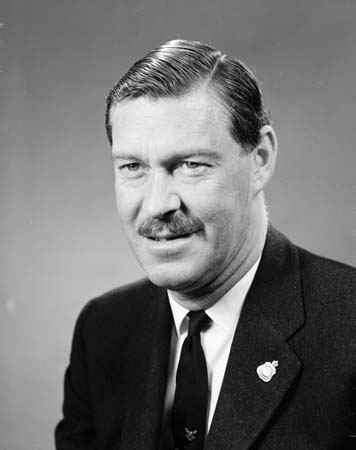

Member of the Australian Parliament for Angas
- In office 20 June 1964 – 10 December 1977
- Preceded by: Alec Downer
- Succeeded by: Division abolished

Member of the Australian Parliament for Wakefield
- In office 10 December 1977 – 4 February 1983
- Preceded by: Bert Kelly
- Succeeded by: Neil Andrew

Member of the South Australian Legislative Council
- In office 17 February 1959 – 13 May 1964

Personal details
- Born: 27 June 1923 Adelaide, South Australia
- Died: 18 December 1990 (aged 67) Kensington Park, South Australia
- Party: Liberal and Country League, Liberal Party of Australia
- Occupation: Grazier

Military service
- Allegiance: Australia
- Branch/service: Royal Australian Air Force
- Years of service: 1942–1945
- Rank: Flight Lieutenant
- Battles/wars: Second World War

Geoffrey O'Halloran Giles (27 June 1923 – 18 December 1990) was an Australian politician.

Giles was born in Adelaide, South Australia, a son of Hew O'Halloran Giles, and Nellie Cosford Giles (née Verco), eldest daughter of Dr. W. A. Verco. They lived at Thorngate, then "Willyama", Medindie, and he was educated in Victoria at Geelong Grammar School before returning to South Australia to attend the University of Adelaide and Roseworthy College. He became a grazier and cattle breeder, and served in the Royal Australian Air Force from 1942 to 1945 during the Second World War.

In 1959, Giles was elected to a Southern district seat in the Legislative Council as a Liberal and Country League member. In 1964, he resigned to contest the by-election for the Australian House of Representatives seat of Angas, caused by the resignation of Alec Downer; he won the seat as a candidate for the LCL's federal counterpart, the Liberal Party. He held Angas until its abolition in 1977. He then followed most of his constituents into neighboring Wakefield, defeating fellow Liberal Bert Kelly for preselection. Giles served as the member for Wakefield until his retirement in 1983. In 1976 he was Prime Minister Malcolm Fraser's choice to be Speaker of the House of Representatives, however, former Liberal Party leader Billy Snedden secured the support of the party room and became speaker.

Giles died in 1990, aged 67.

Parliament of Australia
Preceded by Alec Downer	Member for Angas; 1964–1977	Succeeded by Division abolished
Preceded by Bert Kelly	Member for Wakefield; 1977–1983	Succeeded by Neil Andrew
