= William Barlow (vice-chancellor) =

(1834–1915) barrister and university administrator

Dr William Barlow, CMG (1834 – 19 April 1915) was a lawyer in Dublin and in Adelaide, where he served as Vice-Chancellor of the University of Adelaide from 1896 to 1915.

== History ==
Barlow was born in Dublin, a son of Mr. Peter Barlow QC. He was educated at Trinity College, Dublin, where he joined the Trinity College Historical Society, and served as its auditor (chief executive officer), and won their gold medal for oratory. He was conferred BA in 1855, called to the Irish Bar in 1858, and practised law for several years.

He emigrated to South Australia in 1870 and was admitted to the South Australian Bar that same year. He had a solo practice until February 1873, when he joined Sir Richard Baker in partnership as Baker & Barlow, later of Morialta Chambers, Victoria Square (west). He gained the LL.D. degree in 1884. In 1911 John Richard Baker inherited his late father's share in the business, which still carried the title Baker & Barlow four years after Barlow's death.

In December 1874 he was appointed Registrar of the University of Adelaide, which office he filled until 1882. During this period he also on occasion served as acting clerk of the University Senate. He was then elected to the council, a position he retained until his death. In 1896 he succeeded J. A. Hartley as Vice-Chancellor of the university.

== Other interests ==
- He was a prominent member of the Church of England, and served as Chancellor of the Diocese of Adelaide. He was a member of Synod.
- He was a distinguished Freemason, having been inducted in Ireland, and became Worshipful Master of the Military Lodge in Dublin. He was one of the founders and a Worshipful Master of Mostyn Lodge in South Australia, and one of the founders and first Worshipful Master of Lodge St. Alban.

== Recognition ==
Barlow was awarded a C.M.G. in the King's Birthday honours in 1914, presented by His Excellency the Governor-General (Sir Ronald Munro-Ferguson) on 3 September 1914. His sponsors were Sir John Downer and Professor Stirling, C.M.G.
