= Alick Downer =

Australian politician (1910–1981)

The Honourable Sir Alick Downer KBE
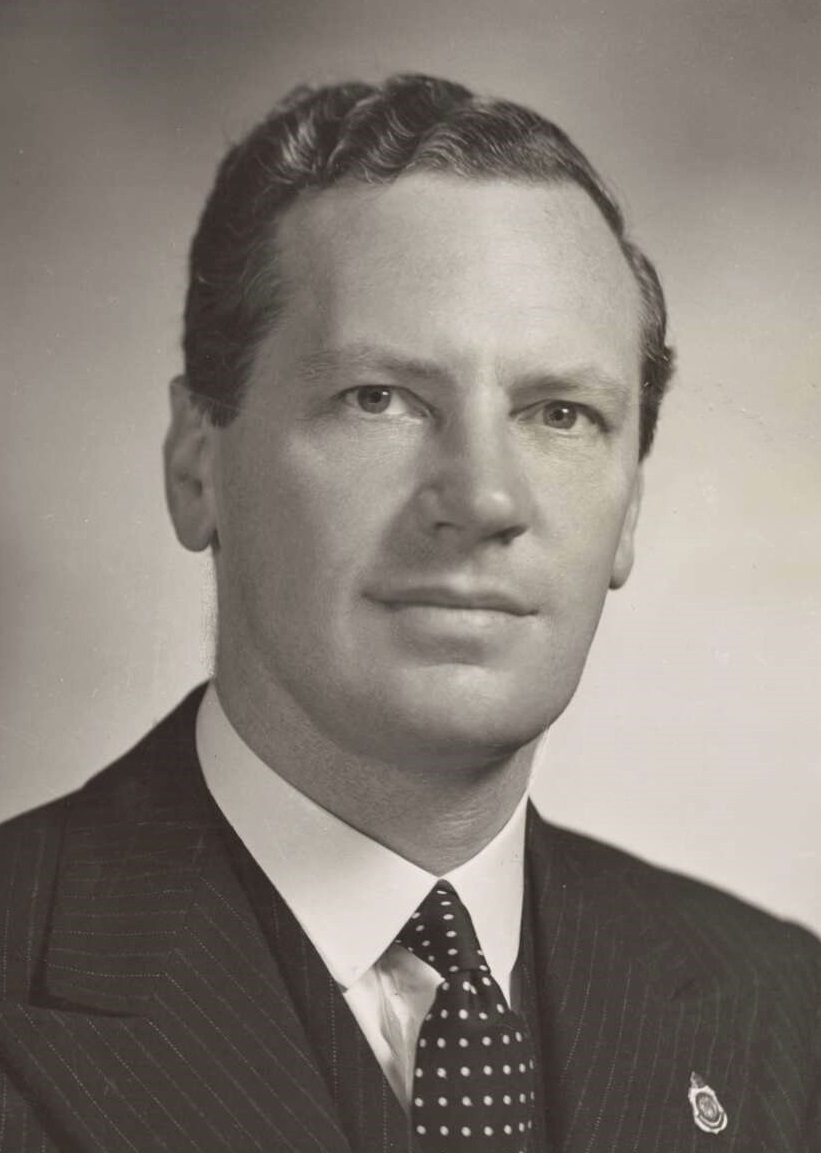
- Official portrait, 1950

Minister for Immigration
- In office 19 March 1958 – 18 December 1963
- Prime Minister: Robert Menzies
- Preceded by: Athol Townley
- Succeeded by: Hubert Opperman

High Commissioner to the United Kingdom
- In office 25 October 1964 – 24 October 1972
- Preceded by: Eric Harrison
- Succeeded by: John Armstrong

Member of the Australian Parliament for Angas
- In office 10 December 1949 – 23 April 1964
- Preceded by: New seat
- Succeeded by: Geoffrey Giles

Personal details
- Born: Alexander Russell Downer; 7 April 1910 North Adelaide, South Australia, Australia
- Died: 30 March 1981 (aged 70) Tanunda, South Australia, Australia
- Party: Liberal
- Spouse: Mary Gosse (m. 1947)
- Children: 4, including Alexander
- Parent: John William Downer (father)
- Education: University of Oxford

Military service
- Allegiance: Australia
- Branch/service: Second Australian Imperial Force
- Years of service: 1940–1945
- Rank: Sergeant
- Unit: 2/14th Field Regiment
- Battles/wars: Second World War; Battle of Singapore

Sir Alexander Russell "Alick" Downer KBE (7 April 1910 – 30 March 1981) was an Australian politician and diplomat. He was a member of the House of Representatives between 1949 and 1963, representing the Liberal Party, and served as Minister for Immigration in the Menzies Government. He was later High Commissioner to the United Kingdom from 1963 to 1972.

== Family, early life and career ==
Downer was born in Adelaide as a member of the influential Downer family. His father, Sir John Downer, was a Premier of South Australia and a member of the Australian Senate and was 66-years old at the time of his birth; he died when Alick was aged five. His mother was Una Russell, daughter of Henry Chamberlain Russell, who remarried when Alick was eight, to D’Arcy Wentworth Addison. Sir Alick's son, Alexander Downer, also a Liberal politician, was Leader of the Opposition in 1994–95 and Foreign Minister of Australia from 1996 to 2007, before becoming Australian High Commissioner to the United Kingdom from 2014 to 2018, five decades after Alick held the same role.

He was educated at Geelong Grammar School and at the University of Oxford, where he graduated in economics and political science. He was the godfather of Charles Spencer, 9th Earl Spencer, brother of Diana, Princess of Wales. The Earl's godmother was Queen Elizabeth II.

After graduating from Oxford in 1932 he read law in London, and in 1934 he was admitted to the bar at Inner Temple. Returning to Adelaide, he joined the South Australian Bar in 1935. He practised as a barrister until joining the Australian Army in 1940. He served in Malaya and was a prisoner-of-war for three years, where he set up a camp library and gave lessons to other prisoners. He was promoted to sergeant due to these efforts, but the promotion was not recognised upon his release.

His book Six prime ministers (Robert Menzies, John Gorton, Harold Holt, Harold Wilson, Edward Heath, Basil Brooke, 1st Viscount Brookeborough) was published in 1982.

== Political career ==
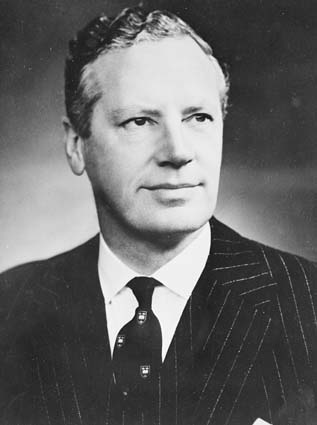
Downer in 1958.

After the war, Downer joined the newly formed Liberal Party of Australia, and in 1949 he was elected to the House of Representatives for the rural-based Division of Angas. By invitation of the premier, Thomas Playford, he joined the board of the Electricity Trust of South Australia for three years and the Art Gallery board where he remained for seventeen years until his appointment as High Commissioner. He served as Minister for Immigration from 1958 to 1963. One of his first acts was to oversee the passage of the Migration Act 1958, which replaced the earlier Immigration Restriction Act 1901 that had formed the basis of the White Australia policy. During his term in office, reforms to migration laws led to the arrival of hundreds of thousands of migrants, mostly from Britain and Europe, where new recruitment posts had been created. Many refugees were also accepted. As a result of his experience as a prisoner of war, he arranged for non-criminal deportees to be held in detention centres instead of being sent to jail.

== Diplomatic career ==
He retired from Parliament upon his appointment as Australian High Commissioner in London, a position he held until 1972. The building of the High Commission, Australia House, has a Downer Room on the first floor, named in his honour. Downer was appointed a Knight Commander of the Order of the British Empire in the 1965 Birthday Honours. He was made a Freeman of the City of London in 1965.

Downer actively lobbied both the prime minister, William McMahon, and the British government directly, for a peerage of the UK Parliament. McMahon wrote to 10 Downing Street with a proposal, but it was declined. Downer was reportedly "very bitter" about this rejection.

== Personal life ==
On 23 April 1947, he married Mary Gosse, daughter of Sir James Gosse, whom he had met at a cocktail party in Adelaide. Together they had four children, Stella Mary (born 1948), Angela (born 1949), Alexander Downer (born 1951), who would later serve as the leader of the Liberal Party (1994 to 1995) and Minister for Foreign Affairs under the Howard government, and Una Joanna (born 1955).

== Arbury Park ==
In 1932, Downer bought the property known as Raywood in the Adelaide Hills, which he renamed Arbury Park after Arbury Hall, near Nuneaton, Warwickshire where his friends the Newdigate family lived. He was responsible for the construction of the large Georgian mansion and extensive formal gardens and deer park, "which was important to his concept of the property as an English estate". The property, after reversion to its former name when bought by the state government in 1965, is heritage-listed.

== Electoral history ==
=== Federal ===
==== House of Representatives ====
Election year	Electorate	Party	Votes	FP%		2PP%		Result
1949	Angas	Liberal	23,987	60.8%	▲8.9	63.1%	▲8.1	First
1951	Angas	Liberal	25,323	63.9%	▲3.1	63.9%	▲3.1	First
1954	Angas	Liberal	unopposed					
1955	Angas	Liberal	26,823	70.0%	▼30.0	72.2%	▼27.8%	First
1958	Angas	Liberal	23,987	61.4%	▼8.6	67.7%	▼4.5	First
1961	Angas	Liberal	22,798	56.7%	▼4.7	61.6%	▼6.1	First
1963	Angas	Liberal	25,676	61.9%	▲5.2	62.2%	▲0.6	First

== See also ==
- Downer family
- Political families of Australia

Political offices
Preceded by Athol Townley	Minister for Immigration; 1958–1963	Succeeded by Hubert Opperman
Parliament of Australia
New division	Member for Angas; 1949–1964	Succeeded by Geoffrey Giles
Diplomatic posts
Preceded by Sir Eric Harrison	Australian High Commissioner to the United Kingdom; 1964–1972	Succeeded by John Armstrong
