= Division of Angas (1949–1977) =

Former Australian federal electoral division

Coordinates: 35°07′01″S 139°16′01″E

Angas Australian House of Representatives Division
- Created: 1949
- Abolished: 1977
- Namesake: George Fife Angas

The Division of Angas was an Australian Electoral Division in South Australia. The division was proclaimed at the redistribution of 11 May 1949 and abolished in 1977. It was named for George Fife Angas, a South Australian pioneer politician, banker and pastoralist who played a significant part in the formation and establishment of the Province of South Australia.

== Geography ==
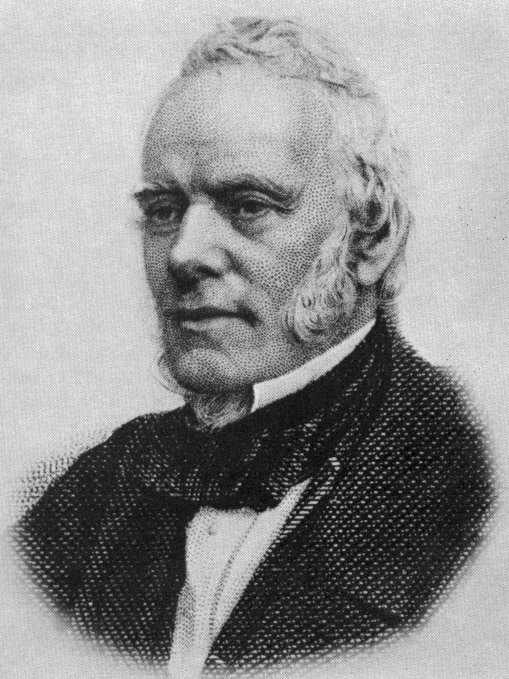
George Fife Angas, the division's namesake

Angas was based in eastern and north-eastern rural areas of South Australia including Mount Barker, Murray Bridge, Loxton, Renmark and originally included the township of Angaston on the eastern boundary. Until 1955 the seat had originally continued north, halfway to the northern border of South Australia. From that point, the seat's boundaries remained relatively stable.

== History ==
This was the second incarnation of Division the first being in Division of Angas (1903–1934) on different boundaries. The seat was proclaimed at the redistribution of 11 May 1949 when the number of Divisions in South Australia increased to 10. It was first contested at the 1949 federal election and was won by Sir Alexander Russell "Alick" Downer, son of Sir John William Downer a former Premier and Senator of South Australia, who had joined the newly formed Liberal Party of Australia. It was a safe to very safe seat for the Liberal Party throughout its history.

== Members ==
Image	Member	Party	Term	Notes
	Alexander Downer (1910–1981)	Liberal	10 December 1949 – 23 April 1964	Served as minister under Menzies. Resigned to become the High Commissioner to the United Kingdom
	Geoffrey Giles (1923–1990)	Liberal	20 June 1964 – 10 December 1977	Previously a member of the South Australian Legislative Council. Transferred to the Division of Wakefield after Angas was abolished in 1977

== See also ==
- Division of Angas (1903-34)
