= William Mitchell (philosopher) =

Australian philosopher (1861–1962)

Sir William Mitchell KCMG
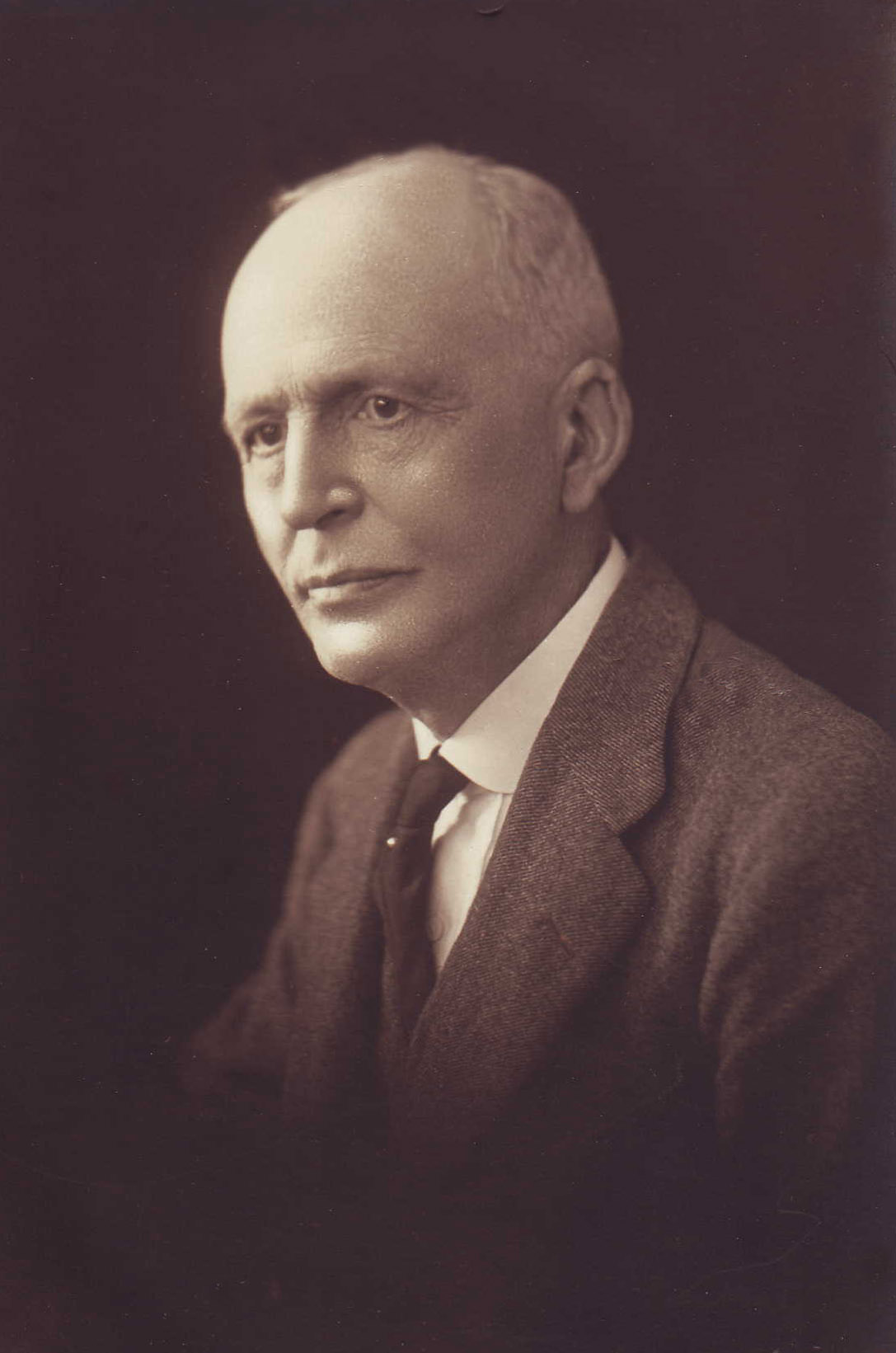
- Mitchell in 1941
- Born: 27 March 1861; Inveravon, Scotland, United Kingdom of Great Britain and Ireland (now United Kingdom)
- Died: 24 June 1962 (aged 101); Adelaide, South Australia, Australia
- Resting place: Mitcham Anglican Cemetery

Philosophical work
- Era: 20th-century philosophy
- Region: Western philosophy

Sir William Mitchell, KCMG (27 March 1861 – 24 June 1962) was a Scottish-born Australian philosopher and academic. He was Professor of English Language, Literature, Mental and Moral Philosophy at the University of Adelaide from 1894–1922, Vice-Chancellor 1916–1942 and Chancellor 1942–1948.

== Education ==
Mitchell was educated at the University of Edinburgh where he graduated with a Master of Arts degree with first class honors in 1886, followed by a doctor of science in 1891 from the Department of Mental Science. At Edinburgh, Mitchell's thesis was supervised by Alexander Campbell Fraser, and he was assistant to Henry Calderwood.

== Career ==
Mitchell was an enthusiast for literary societies, and was in 1883 a foundation member of the South Australian Literary Societies' Union, served as its president in 1901, and remained a staunch supporter of the Union in 1937. Mitchell was Professor of English Language, Literature, Mental and Moral Philosophy at the University of Adelaide from 1894–1922. He also held the position of Vice-Chancellor from 1916–1942 and was Chancellor from 1942–1948.

Mitchell wrote about issues overlapping philosophy of mind and science, neurology, quantum theory and philosophical psychology.

His work is the subject of a book by W. Martin Davies, The Philosophy of Sir William Mitchell, 1861–1962 : A Mind's Own Place (2003) ISBN 0-7734-6733-5.

He is also the benefactor of The Professor Sir William Mitchell Prize for Philosophy, Level II, and gives his name to the South Australian Electoral District of Mitchell.

== Personal life ==
On 18 January 1900, Sir William Mitchell married Marjory Erlistoun Barr Smith (1868 – 3 August 1913), fourth daughter of Robert Barr Smith. Their daughter Joanna "Nan" Mitchell (born 1900) married Major David Thompson, of Farnham House, Farnham Royal, Buckinghamshire c. 1 May 1925. The Mitchells' son, Sir Mark Ledingham Mitchell FRACI (who received a knighthood like his father), was the founding Chancellor of Flinders University in South Australia; holding office from 1966–1970.

== Honours ==
Mitchell was knighted in 1927.

== Footnotes ==
- Davies, W. Martin (2003). "Sir William Mitchell, K.C.M.G. (1861–1962): Philosopher and Chancellor of the University of Adelaide". In Healey, John (ed.). S.A.'s Greats: The men and women of the North Terrace plaques. Kent Town, South Australia: Historical Society of South Australia. ISBN 0-9579430-0-8.
