= List of Rhodes Scholars =

This is a list of Rhodes Scholars, covering notable people who have received a Rhodes Scholarship to the University of Oxford since its 1902 founding, sorted by the year the scholarship started and student surname. All names are verified using the Rhodes Scholar Database. This is not an exhaustive list of all Rhodes Scholars.

== Rhodes Scholars ==
Name	Prior higher education	Constituent college	Award year	Awardee region	Notability
Plum Lewis		Balliol	1903	South Africa	Test cricketer
William Macmillan	Stellenbosch University	Merton	1903	South Africa	Historian of South Africa and critic of colonial rule in Africa and the West Indies
Karl von Müller		Oriel	1903	Germany	Historian
John Behan	University of Melbourne	Hertford	1904	Australia	Lawyer and academic (University and Trinity Colleges)
Carl Brinkmann		Queen's	1904	Germany	German sociologist and economist
Robert Brooks	Georgia Military College; University of Wisconsin, Madison	Brasenose	1904	United States	Commercial history professor
Lawrence Gipson	University of Idaho	Lincoln	1904	United States	Historian
Robert Henry	University of Chicago	Worcester	1904	United States	Law professor
Stanley Hornbeck	University of Colorado, Boulder; University of Denver	Christ Church	1904	United States	United States Ambassador to the Netherlands (1944–1947)
Worthington Hoskin		Trinity	1904	South Africa	Cricketer
Noel Howe-Browne		Oriel	1904	South Africa	Barrister, rugby union international, and member of the Tanganyika Legislative Council
Norman Jolly	University of Adelaide	Balliol	1904	Australia	Forester who played First-class cricket for Worcestershire
Chester Martin	University of New Brunswick	Balliol	1904	Canada	Historian; president of the Canadian Historical Association (1928–1929)
Harold Merriam	University of Wyoming	Lincoln	1904	United States	Literature professor
David Porter	Bowdoin College	Trinity	1904	United States	YMCA advocate
Ellis Robins	University of Pennsylvania	Christ Church	1904	United States	Businessman
Arthur Roe		Balliol	1904	Australia	Medical doctor
Herbert Rose	McGill University	Balliol	1904	Canada	Greek mythology scholar
John Sherburne	University of Vermont	Wadham	1904	United States	Chief justice of the Vermont Supreme Court (1949–1955)
Allan Thomson	University of Otago	St John's	1904	New Zealand	Director of the Museum of New Zealand Te Papa Tongarewa
John Tigert	Vanderbilt University	Pembroke	1904	United States	U.S. Commissioner of Education (1921–1928), president of the University of Florida (1928–1947)
Frank Aydelotte	Indiana University, Bloomington	Brasenose	1905	United States	President of Swarthmore College (1921–1940)
Frank Day	Mount Allison University	Christ Church	1905	Canada	Athlete, academic and author
James Macdonnell		Balliol	1905	Canada	MP for Muskoka—Ontario (1945–1949) Greenwood (1949–1962)
John Orr	University of Tasmania	Balliol	1905	Australia	Scholar of French language and philology and translator; president of the Modern Humanities Research Association (1954) and the International Federation for Modern Languages and Literatures (1963–1966)
Talbot Papineau	McGill University	Brasenose	1905	Canada	WWI soldier
Philip Robertson	Victoria University of Wellington	Trinity	1905	New Zealand	New Zealand chemist, university professor and writer
Roy Robinson	University of Adelaide	Magdalen	1905	Australia	The first Baron Robinson, regarded as the chief architect of state forestry in Great Britain
Percival Rogers	University of Sydney	Worcester	1905	Australia	Chancellor of the University of Sydney (1936–1941)
William Rose		Magdalen	1905	Canada	Slavic history professor
John Schaeffer	Franklin and Marshall College	Oriel	1905	United States	Classicist
Bernadotte Schmitt	University of Tennessee	Merton	1905	United States	Modern European history professor
Lutz Schwerin von Krosigk	University of Halle; University of Lausanne	Oriel	1905	Germany	Nazi chancellor (1945), foreign minister (1945) and finance minister (1932–1945)
Harry Steger	University of Texas at Austin	Balliol	1905	United States	Writer and editor
Harvey Sutton		New	1905	Australia	Track and field athlete
Beverley Tucker	University of Virginia; Virginia Theological Seminary	Christ Church	1905	United States	Bishop of the Episcopal Diocese of Ohio (1938–1952)
Vernon Lewis		New	1906	South Africa	Member of the Legislative Assembly of Southern Rhodesia; judge of the High Court of Southern Rhodesia
Arnold Seitz		Merton	1906	Australia	Cricketer
Ernst Stadler	University of Strasbourg	Magdalen	1906	Germany	Expressionist poet
Rupert Williamson		Trinity	1906	South Africa	England rugby union international and gold mine manager
Warren Ault	Baker University	Jesus	1907	United States	Historian at Boston University 1913–1957; Huntington Professor of History
Marius Barbeau	Laval University	Oriel	1907	Canada	Canadian ethnographer and folklorist
Albert Centlivres	University of Cape Town	New	1907	South Africa	Chief Justice of South Africa (1950–1957)
Joseph Trounsell Gilbert		Brasenose	1907	Bermuda	Chief Justice of Bermuda and president of the Legislative Council of Bermuda (1952–1958)
Colin Gilray	University of Otago	University	1907	New Zealand	Educationalist
Reginald Hands		University	1907	South Africa	Cricketer
Clarence Haring	Harvard University	New	1907	United States	American historian
Charles Keith	University of Arkansas	Exeter	1907	United States	American football, basketball and baseball coach
Alain Locke	Harvard University	Hertford	1907	United States	Philosopher, writer, educator and Harlem Renaissance patron
Neal Macrossan		Magdalen	1907	Australia	Chief justice of Queensland 1946–1955
Wilson Mills	Davidson College	Christ Church	1907	United States	Missionary who protected civilians during the Nanjing Massacre
Garnet Portus	University of Sydney	New	1907	Australia	Economist
William Ray	University of Adelaide	Magdalen	1907	Australia	Pathology professor
David Rivett	University of Melbourne	Lincoln	1907	Australia	Chemist and science administrator; chief executive (1927–1045) and chairman of the CSIRO (1946–1949)
Albrecht von Blumenthal	Humboldt University of Berlin	Lincoln	1907	Germany	Classicist
Wilson Wallis	Dickinson College	Wadham	1907	United States	Anthropologist
Henry Winter		University	1907	Canada	Newfoundland MHA (1923–1924; 1932–1934); Commissioner for Home Affairs and Education (1941–1947), Defence (1944–1947), and Justice (1944–1947)
Bob Blake	Vanderbilt University	Exeter	1908	United States	American football player
Rhys Carpenter	Columbia University	Balliol	1908	United States	Classical art historian
Charles David		Hertford	1908	United States	Medieval studies librarian
Kingsley Fairbridge		Exeter	1908	South Africa	British colonial child emigration proponent
Philip Hands		University	1908	South Africa	Cricketer
Frank Holman	University of Utah	Exeter	1908	United States	President of the American Bar Association (1948)
Earle Kennard	Pomona College	Exeter	1908	United States	Theoretical physicist
Ronald Lagden		Oriel	1908	South Africa	English rugby union international and first-class cricketer
Pip Le Couteur	University of Melbourne	University	1908	Australia	Philosophy professor
Roy Leitch	Dalhousie University	New	1908	Canada	English composition professor and soldier
Reginald Rudall		Christ Church	1908	Australia	South Australian MLA (1933–1944), MLC (1944–1955), and Attorney-General (1946–1955)
Stanley Vestal	Southwestern Oklahoma State University	Merton	1908	United States	Historian, novelist, and poet
Lennox Broster	Rhodes University	Trinity	1909	South Africa	Consulting surgeon, Charing Cross Hospital
Bruno Brown		Balliol	1909	Australia	Surgeon and England rugby union international
Thomas Davy		Exeter	1909	Australia	Western Australia Cabinet minister
Frank Edwards	University of Tasmania	Merton	1909	Australia	Tasmanian MLC for Russell (1921–1933)
Henry Fry	University of Adelaide	Balliol	1909	Australia	Physician and anthropologist
John Higgins		Merton	1909	Newfoundland	Leader of the Newfoundland and Labrador Conservative Party (1950–1951)
Charles Littlejohn	University of Melbourne	New	1909	Australia	Olympic rower
Gerrie Maritz		Trinity	1909	South Africa	Judge President of the Transvaal Provincial Division of the Supreme Court of South Africa
Louis Sherman	University of Adelaide	Christ Church	1909	Canada	Anglican Bishop of Calgary (1927–1953) and Metropolitan of Rupert's Land (1943–1953)
Stephen Steyn		University	1909	South Africa	Rugger
Albrecht von Bernstorff		Trinity	1909	Germany	Diplomat
John Waddington		Merton	1909	Bermuda	Colonial administrator
Alfred Burt	University of Toronto	Corpus Christi	1910	Canada	Historian of Canada; president of the Canadian Historical Association
Elmer Davis	Franklin College	Queen's	1910	United States	American newsman, director of the U.S. Office of War Information during World War II
Richard Disney		Exeter	1910	United States	Tax Court judge (1936–1951)
Albert Ellingwood	Colorado College	Merton	1910	United States	Mountaineer
Robert Hale	Bowdoin College	Trinity	1910	United States	Member of the U.S. House of Representatives (1943–1959)
Kenneth Hands		University	1910	South Africa	Cricketer
Ralph Hartley	University of Utah	St John's	1910	United States	Inventor of the Hartley oscillator; mathematician; winner of the IRE Medal of Honor (1946)
Daniel Harvey	Dalhousie University	Queen's	1910	Canada	Historian and archivist; president of the Canadian Historical Association (1937–1938)
Jan Hofmeyr	University of Cape Town	Balliol	1910	South Africa	Academic, public administrator, and South African liberal politician
Earnest Hooton	Lawrence University	University	1910	United States	American physical anthropologist
Edwin Hubble	University of Chicago	Queen's	1910	United States	American astronomer
Roger Loomis	Williams College; Harvard University	New	1910	United States	Arthurian literature expert
Christopher Morley	Haverford College	New	1910	United States	Writer
John Ransom	Vanderbilt University	Christ Church	1910	United States	Poet
John Read	Dalhousie University; Columbia University	University	1910	Canada	Member of the International Court of Justice (1946–1958), Dean of Dalhousie Law School (1924–1929)
Thornton Rockliffe		Magdalen	1910	Australia	First-class cricketer
Whitney Shepardson	Colgate University	Balliol	1910	United States	WWII Secret Intelligence Branch head
Kenneth Sisam	University of Auckland	Merton	1910	New Zealand	Oxford University Press writer
Joseph Thorson		New	1910	Canada	MP for Winnipeg South Centre (1926–1930) and Selkirk (1935–1942)
William Williams	Haverford College	Merton	1910	United States	Mathematician based in Canada
William Ziegler		Wadham	1910	United States	Businessman
Maurice Blake		Magdalen	1911	United States	Philatelist
Joseph Clearihue	University of Victoria; McGill University	Jesus	1911	Canada	Law professor and judge
Alfred Ewert	University of Manitoba	St John's	1911	Canada	Scholar of French language and literature; Professor of the Romance Languages (1930–1958)
Carl Haessler	University of Wisconsin	Balliol	1911	United States	Conscientious objector and head of the Federated Press
Karl Karsten	University of Illinois, Urbana-Champaign; University of Chicago; University of New Mexico	Hertford	1911	United States	Graphical methods economist and statistician
Jakob Larsen	Luther College; Yale University	Queen's	1911	United States	Classicist
Walter Lowdermilk	University of Arizona	Wadham	1911	United States	Soil conservationist
Cecil Madigan	University of Adelaide	Magdalen	1911	Australia	Explorer and geologist
John McNair	University of New Brunswick	University	1911	Canada	Lieutenant Governor of New Brunswick (1965–1968), Premier of New Brunswick (1940–1952)
Basil Melle		Brasenose	1911	South Africa	First-class cricketer
John Rice	Tulane University	Queen's	1911	United States	Rector of Black Mountain College
George Thomson		Corpus Christi	1911	South Africa	Scottish MP for Edinburgh East (1945–1947)
Carl von Campe		Brasenose	1911	Germany	Member of the Bundestag (1950–1952)
Frido von Senger		St John's	1911	Germany	German general during World War II
Hugh Ward	University of Sydney	New	1911	Australia	Bacteriologist, Olympic rower
James Watkins	University of Michigan	Oriel	1911	United States	Commissioner of the Detroit Police Department
Edmund Herring	University of Melbourne	New	1912	Australia	Australian Army general, barrister, chief justice of the Supreme Court of Victoria (1944–1964), lieutenant governor of Victoria (1945–1972)
Edmund Jones	University of Adelaide	Magdalen	1912	Australia	Cricketer and rules footballer
Alan Wallace	Auckland University College	Balliol	1912	New Zealand	First-class cricketer
Brand Blanshard	University of Michigan	Merton	1913	United States	Philosopher
Henry Brose	University of Adelaide	Christ Church	1913	Australia	Physicist, academic, pathologist, biochemist
Oliver Carmichael	Alabama Presbyterian College; University of Alabama	Wadham	1913	United States	President of the University of Alabama (1953–1957), Chancellor of Vanderbilt University (1937–1946)
Clive Carruthers		Corpus Christi	1913	Canada	Classical philosophy professor
Frank Kerr	University of Melbourne	University	1913	Australia	Australian rules footballer, doctor and soldier
John Kyle	University of Mississippi	Pembroke	1913	United States	Lawyer
George Noble	University of Washington	Worcester	1913	United States	Political scientist
Vyvyan Pearse		Brasenose	1913	South Africa	Cricketer
Georg Rosen		Oriel	1913	Germany	Diplomat
Bevil Rudd		Trinity	1913	South Africa	Olympic sprinter
Ethelbert Southee	University of Sydney	St John's	1913	Australia	Principal of Hawkesbury Agricultural College (1921–1954)
Norman Taber	Brown University	St John's	1913	United States	Olympic runner
Harvie Branscomb	Birmingham-Southern College	Wadham	1914	United States	Chancellor of Vanderbilt University (1946–1963)
Charles Clason	Bates College	Christ Church	1914	United States	U.S. Congressman (Massachusetts) (1937–1949)
Jackie de Villiers		University	1914	South Africa	Judge President of the Cape Provincial Division of the High Court of South Africa
Cyrus Gentry		Wadham	1914	United States	General counsel of Royal Dutch Shell
John Glenn	Wofford College	Exeter	1914	United States	District Court judge (1929–1938)
Robert Gooch	University of Virginia	Christ Church	1914	United States	Political scientist and college football player
Paul Homan	Willamette University	Lincoln	1914	United States	Economics professor
Norman Manley		Jesus	1914	Jamaica	Chief Minister of Jamaica 1955–1959, premier of Jamaica 1959–1962
Charles Manning		Brasenose	1914	South Africa	Montague Burton Professor of International Relations at LSE (1930–1962)
Wilder Penfield	Princeton University	Merton	1914	United States	Canadian neurosurgeon
Edgar Rochette		Pembroke	1914	Canada	Member of the Legislative Assembly of Quebec (1939–1944, 1927–1936)
Gilchrist Stockton	Princeton University	Christ Church	1914	United States	Minister to Austria (1930–1933)
John Weir	University of Saskatchewan	Merton	1914	Canada	Dean of the University of Alberta Faculty of Law (1926–1942)
Hessel Yntema	Hope College; University of Michigan	Wadham	1914	United States	Legal scholar
Walter Crawford	University of Sydney	New	1915	Australia	Cricketer
Eric Gordon	Victoria College; McGill University	University	1915	Canada	Medieval Germanic philologist
Wilfrid Hughes		Christ Church	1915	Australia	Australian soldier, Olympian and Olympic Games organiser, author, and federal and state government minister
Leonard Morgan	Rhodes University College	St John's	1915	Rhodesia	Secretary for Education of the Federation of Rhodesia and Nyasaland
Henry Nolan	University of Alberta	University	1915	Canada	Puisne Justice of the Supreme Court of Canada (1956–1957)
Francis Williams	University of Adelaide	Balliol	1915	Australia	Anthropologist
Miner Bates	Hiram College	St John's	1916	United States	Member of the International Committee for the Nanking Safety Zone during the Nanjing Massacre
Edward Berry	University of British Columbia	St John's	1916	Canada	Canadian soldier
Robert Coffin	Bowdoin College; Princeton University	Trinity	1916	United States	Pulitzer Prize for Poetry (1936)
Malcolm Hollett	Mount Allison University	University	1916	Newfoundland	Leader of the Newfoundland and Labrador Conservative Party (1953–1959)
Howard Rayner	University of Adelaide	Balliol	1916	Australia	Cricketer and rules footballer
Cuthbert Simpson	University of King's College	Christ Church	1916	Canada	Dean of Christ Church, Oxford (1959–1969)
Frank Barr		Balliol	1917	United States	Historian and president of St. John's College
Scott Buchanan	Amherst College	Balliol	1917	United States	Philosopher
Hugh Cairns	University of Adelaide	Balliol	1917	Australia	Neurosurgeon and motorcycle helmet advocate
Thane Campbell	Saint Dunstan's University; Dalhousie University	Corpus Christi	1917	Canada	Premier of Prince Edward Island (1936–1943)
Clark Hopkins	Yale University	Balliol	1917	United States	Archaeologist
Sherwood Lett	University of British Columbia	Trinity	1917	Canada	Chancellor of the University of British Columbia (1951–1957)
Charles Morales		Oriel	1917	Jamaica	First-class cricket international
Felix Morley	Haverford College	New	1917	United States	Journalist and president of Haverford College
John Moseley	Rhodes College; Austin College; Southeastern Oklahoma State University; University of Oklahoma	Merton	1917	United States	President of the University of Nevada, Reno (1944–1949)
Kenneth Bailey	University of Melbourne	Corpus Christi	1918	Australia	Solicitor-General of Australia; father of Peter Bailey
Guy Blaikie		St John's	1918	South Africa	Cricketer
William Browne		Merton	1918	Canada	MP for St. John's West (1949–1953; 1957–1962)
Clifford Durr	University of Alabama	Queen's	1918	United States	Commissioner of the Federal Communications Commission (1941–1948)
Virgil Hancher	University of Iowa	Worcester	1918	United States	President of the University of Iowa (1940–1964) and lawyer
Terence MacDermot	McGill University	New	1918	Canada	Diplomat
Harold Miller		Balliol	1918	New Zealand	Librarian
Vivian Neser		Brasenose	1918	South Africa	Cricketer and judge
Stanley Pargellis	University of Nevada; Harvard University	Exeter	1918	United States	Military historian
Fred Paterson	University of Queensland	Merton	1918	Australia	The only Australian Communist politician ever to win an election
Norman Rogers	Acadia University	University	1918	Canada	Minister of National Defence (1939–1940)
John Saunders	Washington University	Magdalen	1918	United States	Screenwriter of Wings and The Dawn Patrol
Clarence Streit	University of Montana	University	1918	United States	Journalist
George Willison	Vanderbilt University	Exeter	1918	United States	Historian and editor
Crane Brinton	Harvard University	New	1919	United States	Historian; writer of The Anatomy of Revolution (1938)
Jacobus Duminy		University	1919	South Africa	Cricketer
William Elliott		Balliol	1919	United States	Historian and presidential advisor
William Ernst		University	1919	Canada	MP for Queens—Lunenburg (1926–1935)
Edward Mason	University of Kansas; Harvard University	Lincoln	1919	United States	Economist; dean of the Harvard Graduate School of Public Administration (1947–1958) and president of the American Economic Association (1962)
Roland Michener	University of Alberta	Hertford	1919	Canada	Governor General of Canada (1967–1974), lawyer, politician
Francis Miller	Washington and Lee University	Trinity	1919	United States	Member of the Virginia House of Delegates (1938–1942)
Frank Morley	Johns Hopkins University	New	1919	United States	Mathematician and author; co-director of Faber & Faber
Norman Richmond		University	1919	New Zealand	Adult education organiser
Charles Smith	University of Manitoba	Queen's	1919	Canada	Manitoba MLA (1941–1952)
Robert Tredgold		Hertford	1919	Rhodesia	Minister of Justice and Defence (1940–1943, 1936)
Arthur Wheen	University of Sydney	New	1919	Australia	Keeper of Victoria and Albert Museum
George Wisdom		Oriel	1919	Rhodesia	Resident Commissioner of Malacca (1949–1954)
Bill Airey	University of Auckland	Merton	1920	New Zealand	History professor
Robert Barbour		Balliol	1920	Australia	Cricketer
George Estabrooks	Harvard University	Exeter	1920	Canada	Psychology department head at Colgate University, authority on hypnosis during World War II
Keith Hancock	University of Melbourne	Balliol	1920	Australia	Historian, academic, biographer
John Harlan	Princeton University	Balliol	1920	United States	Associate Justice of the U.S. Supreme Court (1955–1971)
John Nicolson		Hertford	1920	South Africa	Cricketer
Edward Pitblado	University of Manitoba	Queen's	1920	Canada	Lawyer and Olympic ice hockey player for the United Kingdom
Frank Scott	Bishop's University	Magdalen	1920	Canada	Co-Founder of the Co-operative Commonwealth Federation, writer
Vernon Treatt	University of Sydney	New	1920	Australia	Leader of the Opposition of New South Wales (1946–1954)
Arthur Vidrine	Tulane University	Exeter	1920	United States	Physician
Joseph Brandt	University of Oklahoma	Lincoln	1921	United States	President of the University of Oklahoma (1941–1943)
Corwin Edwards	University of Missouri	Lincoln	1921	United States	Economist
John Farthing	McGill University	New	1921	Canada	Political scientist
Howard Florey	University of Adelaide	Magdalen	1921	Australia	Australian pharmacologist, Nobel Prize in Medicine, 1945 (for penicillin)
John Fulton	University of Minnesota; Harvard University	Magdalen	1921	United States	Neurophysiologist and science historian
King Gordon	University of Manitoba	Queen's	1921	Canada	Christian ethics professor
Loyd Haberly	Reed College; Harvard University	Trinity	1921	United States	Poet
Robert Heiner	Johns Hopkins University	Christ Church	1921	United States	Lawyer
Albert Jacobs	University of Michigan	Oriel	1921	United States	Chancellors of the University of Denver (1949–1953)
Tom Lawton	University of Queensland; University of Sydney	New	1921	Australia	Rugby union international
Hubert Ryburn		Lincoln	1921	New Zealand	Presbyterian minister and chancellor of the University of Otago (1955–1970)
Alan Watt	University of Sydney	Oriel	1921	Australia	Australian Ambassador to Singapore (1954), Japan (1956–1959) and Germany (1960–1962)
George Aitken	Victoria University of Wellington	St John's	1922	New Zealand	Rugger
Bertrand Bronson	University of Michigan; Harvard University	Oriel	1922	United States	English literature professor
John Carleton	Dartmouth College	Magdalen	1922	United States	Olympic skier and lawyer
Eddie Eagan	Denver University; Yale University; Harvard University	New	1922	United States	Olympic boxer and bobsledder
Wilbert Hurst-Brown		Queen's	1922	Canada	British physician and Olympic ice hockey player
John Lowe	Trinity College, Toronto	Christ Church	1922	Canada	Vice Chancellor of the University of Oxford (1948–1951), Dean of Christ Church, Oxford (1939–1959)
Lindsay Ride	University of Melbourne	New	1922	Australia	Vice Chancellor of the University of Hong Kong (1949–1964)
Graham Spry	University of Manitoba	University	1922	Canada	Broadcaster and diplomat
William Stevenson	Princeton University	Balliol	1922	United States	American Olympic gold medalist in 1924 (Paris), president of Oberlin College (1946–1961), U.S. Ambassador to the Philippines (1961–1965)
Alan Valentine	Swarthmore College; University of Pennsylvania	Balliol	1922	United States	President of the University of Rochester (1935–1950)
Johnnie Wallace	University of Sydney	New	1922	Australia	Rugby union international
Walter Worboys	University of Western Australia	Lincoln	1922	Australia	British road traffic signage reformer
Murray Emeneau	Dalhousie University	Balliol	1923	Canada	Linguist; president of the Linguistic Society of America (1949)
Francis Fergusson	Harvard University	Queen's	1923	United States	Dramatic theorist
Robert Hall	University of Queensland	Magdalen	1923	Australia	Principal of Hertford College, Oxford (1964–1967), chief economic advisor to the British government (1947–1961)
Arnold Heeney	University of Manitoba	St John's	1923	Canada	Ambassador to the United States (1959–1962, 1953–1957)
Leonard Huxley	University of Tasmania	New	1923	Australia	Australian physicist
David Johnson	McGill University	Balliol	1923	Canada	Track Olympian and diplomat
Albert MacDougall	Mount Allison University	Merton	1923	Canada	British Columbia MLA for Vancouver-Point Grey (1946–1953)
Francis Matthiessen	Yale University	New	1923	United States	Literary critic
Hyatt Mayor	Princeton University	Christ Church	1923	United States	Art historian
Edgar McInnis	University of Toronto	Christ Church	1923	Canada	Poet and historian
Noel Nethersole		Lincoln	1923	Jamaica	Minister of Finance (1955–1959)
Glenn Parker	University of Wyoming	Exeter	1923	United States	Justice of the Wyoming Supreme Court (1955–1975)
Arthur Porritt	University of Otago	Magdalen	1923	New Zealand	New Zealand physician, military surgeon, statesman, athlete, Governor-General of New Zealand (1967–1972)
Roland Raymond		New	1923	Australia	Rugby union international
Norman Robertson	University of British Columbia	Balliol	1923	Canada	Canadian High Commissioner to the United Kingdom (1952–1957, 1946–1949), Clerk of the Privy Council (1949–1952)
Robert Aitken	University of Otago	Balliol	1924	New Zealand	Vice-Chancellor of the University of Otago (1948–1953) and the University of Birmingham (1953–1968)
Henry Borden		Exeter	1924	Canada	Lawyer, businessman, and public servant
Robert Brode	Whitman College; California Institute of Technology	Oriel	1924	United States	Manhattan Project nuclear physicist
William Butterworth	Princeton University	Worcester	1924	United States	United States Ambassador to Canada (1962–1968), United States Ambassador to the European Communities (1961–1962)
Hervey Cleckley	University of Georgia	University	1924	United States	Psychiatrist, pioneer in the field of psychopathy, co-author of The Three Faces of Eve
James Corry	University of Saskatchewan	Lincoln	1924	Canada	Principal of Queen's University at Kingston (1961–1968)
John Findlay	University of Pretoria	Balliol	1924	Australia	Philosopher, Gifford lecturer; Meinong, Hegel, Husserl and Wittgenstein scholar
Otis Lee	Fargo College; University of Minnesota	St John's	1924	United States	Philosopher
Louis Serrurier	University of Cape Town	Brasenose	1924	South Africa	First-class cricketer
Reginald Sholl	University of Melbourne	New	1924	Australia	Judge and diplomat
Donald Stauffer	Princeton University	Merton	1924	United States	Literary critic
P. R. Stephensen	University of Queensland	Queen's	1924	Australia	Co-founder of the Australia First Movement
Thomas Stratten	University of Cape Town	Balliol	1924	South Africa	Engineer; president of the South African Institute of Electrical Engineers
Carl Strom	Luther College	Queen's	1924	United States	Ambassador to Cambodia (1956–1959) and Bolivia (1959–1961)
Arthur Wilson	Yankton College	Exeter	1924	United States	Biographer
Arthur Bond	University of Missouri	Christ Church	1925	United States	American football player
Jack Dunning	University of Auckland; University of Otago	New	1925	New Zealand	Cricketer
John Eccles	University of Melbourne	Magdalen	1925	Australia	Australian neurophysiologist, Nobel Prize in Medicine, 1963, for his work on the synapse
William Fulbright	University of Arkansas	Pembroke	1925	United States	U.S. senator for Arkansas (1945–1974), originator of the Fulbright Fellowship program
Mason Hammond	Harvard University	Balliol	1925	United States	Latin and Roman Empire historian
Wilson Lyon	University of Mississippi	St John's	1925	United States	President of Pomona College (1941–1969)
Stefan Naudé	Stellenbosch University		1925	South Africa	Physicist; president of the Council for Scientific and Industrial Research (1952–1971) and chairman of the Simon van der Stel Foundation
John Olmsted	Deep Springs College; University of California, Los Angeles; University of California, Berkeley	Magdalen	1925	United States	Early modern European history professor
Charles Saltzman	United States Military Academy	Magdalen	1925	United States	Assistant Secretary of State for Occupied Areas (1947–1949) and Under Secretary of State for Administration (1954)
Douglas Steere	Michigan State University	Oriel	1925	United States	Quaker ecumenist
Robert Van de Graaff	University of Alabama	Queen's	1925	United States	Physicist, academic (MIT and Princeton), and inventor of the Van de Graaff generator
William Vaughn	Vanderbilt University	Christ Church	1925	United States	President (1960–1967) and Chair (1967–1970) of Eastman Kodak
Roland Wilson	University of Tasmania	Oriel	1925	Australia	Secretary of the Department of the Treasury (1951–1966)
Hector Allard		St John's	1926	Canada	Permanent Delegate to the United Nations (1953–1957) and ambassador to Cuba, Dominican Republic, and Haiti (1957–1959) and to Denmark (1960–1967)
Clarence Campbell	University of Alberta	Lincoln	1926	United States	President of the National Hockey League (1946–1977)
Erwin Canham	Bates College	Oriel	1926	United States	Resident Commissioner of the Northern Marianas Islands (1975–1978), Editor of The Christian Science Monitor
Gordon Chalmers	Brown University	Wadham	1926	United States	17th-century English literature academic
Eugene Forsey	McGill University	Balliol	1926	Canada	Member of the Canadian Senate (1970–1979)
Caleb Gates	Princeton University	Balliol	1926	United States	Historian; chancellor of the University of Denver.(1941–1943; 1946–1947)
John Hood	University of Tasmania	Magdalen	1926	Australia	Australian Ambassador to Israel (1963–1964), Australian Ambassador to Germany (1952–1956), Australian Ambassador to Indonesia (1950–1952), Australian Ambassador to the United Nations (1947–1950)
William Maynes		University	1926	Canada	Olympic sprinter
Colin Melville	University of Natal	Trinity	1926	South Africa	Cricketer
Nathan Parker	Dartmouth College	Magdalen	1926	United States	American football player
George Paton	University of Melbourne	Magdalen	1926	Australia	Vice chancellor University of Melbourne (1951–1968)
George Pfann	Cornell University	Brasenose	1926	United States	Quarterback
John Rowley		Trinity	1926	South Africa	English cricketer and colonial administrator; Governor of Darfur (1953–1955)
Karl Young	Utah State University; Harvard University	Hertford	1926	United States	Mormon historian
Noel Bayliss	University of Melbourne	Lincoln	1927	Australia	Chemistry professor
Hugh Beadle	University of Cape Town	Queen's	1927	Rhodesia	Chief Justice of Southern Rhodesia (1961–1977)
Andrew Corry	Carroll College; Harvard University	Merton	1927	United States	United States Ambassador to Sri Lanka and the Maldives (1967–1970), United States Ambassador to Sierra Leone (1964–1967)
Thomas Gubb		University	1927	South Africa	Businessman and British rugby union international
Konrad Hirschfeld	University of Queensland	New	1927	Australia	Surgeon
Charles Horowitz	University of Washington	Brasenose	1927	United States	Washington Supreme Court Justice (1975–1980)
Wilfrid Kalaugher	Victoria University of Wellington	Balliol	1927	New Zealand	New Zealand athlete, scholar and teacher
Myres McDougal	University of Mississippi	St John's	1927	United States	International law professor
Ross McLean	University of Manitoba	Balliol	1927	Canada	Commissioner of the National Film Board of Canada
Escott Reid	University of Toronto	Christ Church	1927	Canada	Diplomat
William Spackman	Princeton University	Balliol	1927	United States	Writer
George Curtis	University of Saskatchewan	Lincoln	1928	Canada	Dean of the University of British Columbia Faculty of Law (1945–1971)
William Derryberry	University of Tennessee	St John's	1928	United States	President of Tennessee Technological University (1940–1974) and American football player
Bergen Evans	Miami University; Harvard University	University	1928	United States	English literature professor
William Helmbold		Merton	1928	United States	Classical scholar and translator
Clyde Kluckhohn	Princeton University; University of Wisconsin, Madison	Corpus Christi	1928	United States	Navajo ethnographer
Harlan Logan	Indiana University, Bloomington	Lincoln	1928	United States	Majority Leader of the New Hampshire House of Representatives
Hugh MacLennan	Dalhousie University	Oriel	1928	Canada	Novelist and non-fiction writer; winner of five Governor General's Awards
Holbrook MacNeille	Swarthmore College	Balliol	1928	United States	Mathematician, academic, scientific director Office of Scientific Research and Development
Ronald Martland	University of Alberta	Hertford	1928	Canada	Puisne Justice of the Supreme Court of Canada (1958–1982)
John Platts-Mills	Victoria University of Wellington	Balliol	1928	New Zealand	New Zealand barrister, QC, British Labour Party politician
Allen Read	University of Iowa	St Edmund	1928	United States	American etymologist and lexicographer
Allan Scott		Jesus	1928	United States	Academy Award-winning screenwriter
James Sinclair	University of British Columbia	St John's	1928	Canada	Member of Parliament (1940–1958)
Alfred Smith		Balliol	1928	Australia	Cricketer
Pieter van der Bijl		Brasenose	1928	South Africa	Cricketer
Robert Warren	Vanderbilt University	New	1928	United States	American poet and critic
Dixon Wecter	Baylor University; Yale University	Merton	1928	United States	Historian
Armistead Boothe	University of Virginia	Brasenose	1929	United States	Member of the Virginia General Assembly (1948–1964)
Cleanth Brooks	Vanderbilt University; Tulane University	Exeter	1929	United States	American literary critic
Al Cornsweet	Brown University	St John's	1929	United States	Football player-coach
John Fairbank	University of Wisconsin, Madison; Harvard University	Balliol	1929	United States	US-Sino relations professor
Julian Greenfield	University of Cape Town	University	1929	Rhodesia	MP and minister
Frederick Hovde	University of Minnesota	Brasenose	1929	United States	President of Purdue University (1946–1971)
Arthur Keppel-Jones		New	1929	South Africa	Canadian historian and science fiction writer
Richmond Lattimore	Dartmouth College	Christ Church	1929	United States	Classicist and translator
George Lincoln	United States Military Academy	Magdalen	1929	United States	Principal planner of the military campaigns of George C. Marshall
Malcolm MacIntyre	Yale University	Brasenose	1929	United States	United States Under Secretary of the Air Force (1957–1959)
Arthur Smithies	University of Tasmania	Magdalen	1929	Australia	American economist
George Stanley	University of Alberta	Keble	1929	Canada	Canadian historian, designer of Canadian flag, Lieutenant-Governor of New Brunswick (1981–1987)
George Washington	Yale University	Oriel	1929	United States	Judge of the United States Court of Appeals for the District of Columbia Circuit (1949–1965)
Kenneth Wheare		Oriel	1929	Australia	Commonwealth constitutional expert
Herbert Dugmore		New	1930	Rhodesia	First-class cricketer for Eastern Province
Franklin Folsom	University of Colorado, Boulder	Merton	1930	United States	Archeological author
Brian Hone	University of Adelaide	New	1930	Australia	Cricketer
Emory Lindquist	Bethany College	Jesus	1930	United States	Historian, president of Bethany College (Kansas) and Wichita State University
Charles Little	University of Toronto	Brasenose	1930	Canada	Director of Canadian Naval Intelligence during World War II
John Loutit	University of Melbourne	St John's	1930	Australia	Haematologist and radiobiologist
Stanley Osler	University of Cape Town	New	1930	South Africa	Rugby union international
Tuppy Owen-Smith	University of Cape Town	Magdalen	1930	South Africa	Test cricketer and English rugby union international
Earl Pritchard	Washington State College; University of Illinois Urbana-Champaign	Oriel	1930	United States	Sinologist
Fritz Schumacher		New	1930	Germany	Economist, statistician, author, social theorist, public speaker
John Scott	University of Wyoming	Lincoln	1930	United States	Behavior geneticist and comparative psychologist
Allan Seager	University of Michigan	Oriel	1930	United States	Novelist and short story writer
William Whipple	United States Military Academy; Princeton University	Magdalen	1930	United States	Army brigadier general and civil engineer
Carl Albert	University of Oklahoma	St Peter's	1931	United States	Speaker of U.S. House of Representatives (1971–1977), U.S. Congressman (Oklahoma), 1947–1977
Charles Bonesteel	United States Military Academy	Exeter	1931	United States	United States Army general
Paul Bouchard		Wadham	1931	Canada	Editor of La Nation and Quebec sovereigntist
Kenneth Cameron	McGill University	Pembroke	1931	Canada	Literary scholar
James Coyne	University of Manitoba	Queen's	1931	Canada	Governor of the Bank of Canada (1955–1961)
Ben Duniway	Carleton College; Stanford Law School	Merton	1931	United States	Judge of the United States Court of Appeals for the Ninth Circuit (1961–1986)
Bram Fischer	University of the Free State	New	1931	South Africa	Anti-apartheid activist and lawyer
David Garnsey	University of Sydney	New	1931	Australia	Anglican Bishop of Gippsland (1959–1974)
James Gibson	University of British Columbia	New	1931	Canada	Government bureaucrat
Alfred Hayes	Yale University; Harvard University	New	1931	United States	President of the Federal Reserve Bank of New York (1956–1975)
Ted Jolliffe	University of Toronto	Christ Church	1931	Canada	Leader of the Opposition in the Legislative Assembly of Ontario (1943–1945, 1948–1951)
John La Nauze	University of Western Australia	Balliol	1931	Australia	Historian
Henry Lindo		Keble	1931	Jamaica	High Commissioner of Jamaica to the United Kingdom (1962–1973) and Ambassador of Dominica to the United Kingdom (1952–1959)
Jack Lovelock	University of Otago	Exeter	1931	New Zealand	1500 metre Olympic gold medallist in 1936 Berlin Olympics
Brian Maegraith	University of Adelaide	Magdalen	1931	Australia	Professor of tropical medicine at the Liverpool School of Tropical Medicine
William Rangeley	Rhodes University	Brasenose	1931	Rhodesia	Provincial Commissioner of the Southern Province of Malawi (1952–1958); anthropologist
Dean Rusk	Davidson College	St John's	1931	United States	U.S. Secretary of State, 1961–1969
Ferdinand Stone	Ohio State University	Exeter	1931	United States	Comparative law professor
Adam von Trott zu Solz	University of Göttingen	Balliol	1931	Germany	German diplomat and anti-Nazi patriot, executed in 1944
Carl Allendoerfer	Haverford College	New	1932	United States	Mathematician; president of the Mathematical Association of America (1959–1960)
Samuel Beer	University of Michigan	Balliol	1932	United States	UK politics professor
James Bertram	University of Auckland	New	1932	New Zealand	New Zealand journalist, writer, relief worker, prisoner of war and university professor
Munroe Bourne	McGill University	University	1932	Canada	Olympic swimmer
Geoffrey Cox	University of Otago	Oriel	1932	New Zealand	Newspaper and television journalist (ITN) in Britain
Charles Hitch	University of Arizona; Harvard University	Worcester	1932	United States	President of the University of California System (1967–1975); Under Secretary of Defense and Comptroller (1961–1965)
Evelyn Hone		New	1932	Rhodesia	Governor of Northern Rhodesia (1959–1964)
Willmoore Kendall	University of Oklahoma	Pembroke	1932	United States	Political philosophy professor
Arthur Larson	Augustana University	Pembroke	1932	United States	Director of the United States Information Agency (1956–1957)
David Lewis	McGill University	Lincoln	1932	Canada	Member of parliament and leader of the New Democratic Party of Canada (1971–1975)
James McCormack	United States Military Academy	Hertford	1932	United States	Nuclear arms expert
Edward McCourt	University of Alberta	Merton	1932	Canada	Writer
W. L. Morton	University of Manitoba	St John's	1932	Canada	Canadian historian
Don Price	Vanderbilt University	Merton	1932	United States	Founding Dean of the John F. Kennedy School of Government (1958–1976)
Howland Sargeant	Dartmouth College	Oriel	1932	United States	Assistant Secretary of State for Public Affairs (1952–1953)
James Tunnell		Exeter	1932	United States	Delaware Supreme Court Justice (1951–1954) and Democratic Party nominee at the 1966 United States Senate election in Delaware
John Wells	Wesleyan University	Balliol	1932	United States	Corporate lawyer
James Burrowes		St John's	1933	Jamaica	Cricketer
Ross Campbell	University of Melbourne	Magdalen	1933	Australia	Humorist
Frederick Courtice	University of Sydney	New	1933	Australia	Lymphatic physiology expert
Gordon Cowan	Memorial University of Newfoundland; Dalhousie University	Exeter	1933	Canada	Nova Scotia MLA for Halifax Centre (1956–1960)
Merrimon Cuninggim	Vanderbilt University; Duke University	Merton	1933	United States	President of Salem College (1976—1979)
Wilson Elkins	University of Texas, Austin	Oriel	1933	United States	Chancellor of the University of Maryland System (1970–1978)
Paul Engle	Coe College; University of Iowa	Merton	1933	United States	Poet and editor; director of the Iowa Writers' Workshop (1941–1965) and co-founder of the International Writing Program
Ivan Getting	Massachusetts Institute of Technology	Merton	1933	United States	American weapons scientist and co-inventor of GPS technology
Lincoln Gordon	Harvard University	Balliol	1933	United States	President of Johns Hopkins University (1967–1971), United States Ambassador to Brazil (1961–1966)
Charlton Hinman		Hertford	1933	United States	Shakespeare editor
Francis Leddy	University of Saskatchewan; University of Chicago	Exeter	1933	Canada	President of the University of Windsor (1964–1978)
Laurence McIntyre	University of Tasmania	Exeter	1933	Australia	Ambassador to Malaya and Japan; president of the United Nations Security Council (1973)
William McRae	University of Florida	Christ Church	1933	United States	Chief judge (1971–1973) and judge (1962–1973) of the United States District Court for the Middle District of Florida and of the United States District Court for the Southern District of Florida (1961–1962)
Jan McShane		New	1933	Australia	Rugby union international
Thomas Mendenhall	Yale University	Balliol	1933	United States	President of Smith College
Raymond Pruitt	Baker University	Oriel	1933	United States	Founding Dean of the Mayo Medical School
Dudley Spurling		Trinity	1933	United States	Judge and Olympic swimmer
Alfred Wilhelmi	Western Reserve University	Hertford	1933	United States	Endocrinologist; president of the Endocrine Society (1968–1969)
Daniel Boorstin	Harvard University	Balliol	1934	United States	American historian and Librarian of Congress (1975–1987)
Eugene Booth	University of Georgia	Christ Church	1934	United States	Manhattan Project nuclear physicist
Jean Chapdelaine	Collège Sainte-Marie de Montréal	Hertford	1934	Canada	Ambassador to Sweden, Finland, Brazil, Sudan and Egypt
Mac Cooper	Massey University	University	1934	New Zealand	Agricultural scientist
Norman Davis	University of Otago	Merton	1934	New Zealand	English literature professor
Hedley Donovan	University of Minnesota	Hertford	1934	United States	Editor in chief of Time Inc. (1964–1979)
Erich Etienne	Leipzig University; University of Exeter	Wadham	1934	Germany	Geophysicist, polar explorer and pilot
Max Gluckman	University of the Witwatersrand	Exeter	1934	South Africa	South African-British-Israeli social anthropologist
Richard Goodwin	Harvard University	St John's	1934	United States	Mathematician and economist
Andrew Guinand	University of Adelaide	New	1934	Australia	Mathematician
Chauncy Harris	Brigham Young University	Lincoln	1934	United States	Urban geographer
Harry Hopkins		Brasenose	1934	Australia	New Zealand civil engineer
Wilbur Jackett	University of Saskatchewan	Queen's	1934	Canada	Chief justice of the Federal Court of Canada (1971–1979)
George McGhee	Southern Methodist University	Queen's	1934	United States	U.S. ambassador to Turkey (1952–1953) and Germany (1963–1968)
Patrick McTaggart-Cowan	University of British Columbia	Corpus Christi	1934	Canada	President of Simon Fraser University (1964–1968)
Ian Milner		New	1934	New Zealand	KGB agent during the Petrov Affair
John Oakes	Princeton University	Queen's	1934	United States	New York Times editor of the editorial page, 1961–1976
Thornton Page	Yale University	Magdalen	1934	United States	Astronomy professor
Lardy Pyke	University of Melbourne	Lincoln	1934	Australia	Headmaster
Wilfrid Sellars	University of Michigan; University at Buffalo	Oriel	1934	United States	Philosopher and critical realism developer
Gordon Skilling	University of Toronto	Christ Church	1934	Canada	Political scientist
John Templeton	Yale University	Balliol	1934	United States	Businessman and founder of Templeton College, Oxford
Charles Bane	University of Chicago	Queen's	1935	United States	Civil rights lawyer and nominee for judge of the United States Court of Appeals for the Seventh Circuit
Bill Bradfield	University of Sydney	New	1935	Australia	Aviation engineer
Lionel Cooper	University of Cape Town	Queen's	1935	South Africa	Mathematician
John Espey	Occidental College	Merton	1935	United States	Memoirist and English literature professor
Charles Fergusson	Dalhousie University	Exeter	1935	Canada	Historian; provincial archivist of Nova Scotia (1956–1977)
Henry Fowler		Worcester	1935	Jamaica	Educationalist
Duncan Lee		Christ Church	1935	United States	Intelligence officer and alleged Soviet spy
Deming Lewis	Harvard University	Wadham	1935	United States	President of Lehigh University (1964–1982)
Henry Mayo		New	1935	Newfoundland	Political science professor
Thomas McKeown	University of British Columbia; McGill University	Trinity	1935	Canada	Epidemiologist and medical historian
Carl Pfaffmann	Brown University	New	1935	United States	Physiological psychologist
Roger Rossiter	University of Western Australia	Merton	1935	Australia	Neurochemist
Arnold Smith		Christ Church	1935	Canada	First secretary-general of the Commonwealth
Walter Stockmayer	Massachusetts Institute of Technology	Jesus	1935	United States	Polymer chemist
Samuel Welles	Princeton University	University	1935	United States	Journalist
Donald Wheeler	Reed College	Pembroke	1935	United States	Social activist, teacher, and alleged Soviet spy
Clayton White	University of Colorado	Hertford	1935	United States	Physician and nuclear physicist
Henry Shull Arms	University of Idaho	Jesus	1936	United States	Physicist and engineer
Mervyn Austin	University of Melbourne	Christ Church	1936	Canada	Australian headmaster (Newington College) and professor of classics and ancient history (UWA)
Charles Bell	University of Virginia	Exeter	1936	United States	Writer and poet
Dyke Brown	University of California, Berkeley	University	1936	United States	Attorney and Yale law professor, educator, founder of The Athenian School
Gordon Craig	Princeton University	Balliol	1936	United States	American historian and OSS veteran
Dan Davin	University of Otago	Balliol	1936	New Zealand	New Zealand novelist and head of Oxford University Press
Francis Evans	Haverford College	Oriel	1936	United States	President of the Ecological Society of America (1983–1984)
Guy Farmer	West Virginia University	Brasenose	1936	United States	Chair of the National Labor Relations Board (1953–1955)
Hubert Freakes		Magdalen	1936	South Africa	Cricketer and English rugby union international
George Ignatieff	University of Toronto	Trinity	1936	Canada	Russian-born Canadian diplomat, president of the UN Security Council (1968–69), father of Michael Ignatieff
Philip Kaiser	University of Wisconsin, Madison	Balliol	1936	United States	U.S. ambassador to Mauritania (1961–1964), Hungary (1977–1980), and Austria (1980–1981), ASL for International Affairs (1949–1953), special assistant to Governor Averell Harriman (1955–1959)
Richard Luyt	University of Cape Town	Trinity	1936	South Africa	Soldier, statesman and principal and vice-chancellor of the University of Cape Town
Walt Rostow	Yale University	Balliol	1936	United States	Special assistant for national security affairs (1966–1969), deputy special assistant to the president for national security affairs, 1961
Elvis Stahr	University of Kentucky	Merton	1936	United States	United States secretary of the Army (1961–1962)
George Whalley	Bishop's University	Oriel	1936	Canada	Poet, broadcaster, and translator
Murat Williams	University of Virginia	Christ Church	1936	United States	United States Ambassador to El Salvador (1961–1964)
Doug Allen	University of Adelaide	New	1937	Australia	Physics and electrical engineering professor
Robert Babcock	University of Rochester	Balliol	1937	United States	Lieutenant governor of Vermont (1959–1961)
Clifford Dalton	Auckland University College; Canterbury University College	Oriel	1937	New Zealand	Nuclear scientist; invented the fast breeder reactor
Norman Davidson	University of Chicago	Oriel	1937	United States	Molecular biologist and genome researcher
Davie Fulton		St John's	1937	Canada	Minister of justice (1957–1962), MP (1945–1963; 1965–1968), leader of the British Columbia Conservative Party (1963–1965)
Roger Gaudry	Laval University	Oriel	1937	Canada	Rector of the University of Montreal (1965–1975)
Henry Hicks	Mount Allison University; Dalhousie University	Exeter	1937	Canada	Premier of Nova Scotia (1954–1956), president of Dalhousie University (1963–1980), and senator (1972–1990)
Hardwicke Holderness	Rhodes University	Magdalen	1937	Rhodesia	MP (1954–1958) and lawyer
Cresson Kearny	Princeton University	The Queen's	1937	United States	Nuclear survival author
Penn Kimball	Princeton University	Balliol	1937	United States	Journalist
Ken Macalister	University of Toronto	New	1937	Canada	War hero
Bernard Monaghan	Birmingham-Southern College; Harvard University	New	1937	United States	General Counsel of the Army (1952–1953)
Hilgard Muller	University of Pretoria	University	1937	South Africa	Minister of Foreign Affairs (1964–1977)
George Piranian	Utah State University	Hertford	1937	United States	Professor of mathematics, University of Michigan (1945–)
Howard Smith	Tulane University	Merton	1937	United States	Broadcast journalist
Denham Sutcliffe	Bates College	Hertford	1937	United States	Author
Leonard Thompson		New	1937	South Africa	Historian of South Africa
Michael Thwaites	University of Melbourne	New	1937	Australia	Poet, Naval intelligence officer
Ian Wahn		Queen's	1937	Canada	MP for St. Paul's (1962–1972)
Ford Battles	West Virginia University; Tufts University	Exeter	1938	United States	Scholar of John Calvin
George Brown	Queen's University at Kingston	Balliol	1938	Canada	President of the Ontario College of Physicians and Surgeons from 1956 to 1958 and of the Royal College of Physicians and Surgeons of Canada (1962–1964)
Harlan Cleveland	Princeton University	University	1938	United States	United States Ambassador to NATO (1965–1969), Assistant Secretary of State for International Organization Affairs (1961–1965)
Fin Crisp	University of Adelaide	Balliol	1938	Australia	Secretary of the Department of Post-War Reconstruction (1949–1950)
Robert Cumming	Harvard University	New	1938	United States	20th century Continental philosopher
Mickey Davies		Trinity	1938	South Africa	Wales rugby union international
Leigh Gerdine	University of North Dakota	Lincoln	1938	United States	Founder of the Opera Theatre of Saint Louis
Kermit Gordon	Swarthmore College	University	1938	United States	Director of the Bureau of the Budget (1962–1965)
Ralph Harry	University of Tasmania	Lincoln	1938	Australia	Ambassador to the United Nations (1975–1978), Germany (1971–1974), and Vietnam (1968–1970), director of the Australian Secret Intelligence Service (1957–1960), High Commissioner to Singapore (1956–1957)
Lawrence Hogben	University of Auckland	New	1938	New Zealand	Military meteorologist
Moses Morgan	Memorial University of Newfoundland; Dalhousie University	New	1938	Newfoundland	President of Memorial University of Newfoundland (1973–1981, 1966–1967)
Edgar Ritchie	Mount Allison University	Queen's	1938	Canada	Canadian Ambassador to Ireland (1976–1980), Canadian Ambassador to the United States (1966–1970)
Gordon Robertson	University of Saskatchewan	Exeter	1938	Canada	Commissioner of the Northwest Territories (1953–1963)
Dietrich von Bothmer	Humboldt University of Berlin	Wadham	1938	Germany	Curator at the Metropolitan Museum of Art
Edward Weismiller	Cornell College; Harvard University	Merton	1938	United States	Poet
Byron White	University of Colorado, Boulder	Hertford	1938	United States	Football player, Associate Justice of the U.S. Supreme Court, 1962–1993
Morris Abram	University of Georgia	Pembroke	1939	United States	Civil rights attorney
Bob Baker	University of Tasmania	Lincoln	1939	Australia	Member of the Tasmanian House of Assembly (1969–1980)
Charles Collingwood	Deep Springs College; Cornell University	New	1939	United States	War correspondent
Harvey da Costa		St Edmund	1939	Jamaica	Chief Justice of the Bahamas (1980–1981)
Jack Davis	University of British Columbia	St John's	1939	Canada	Canadian Minister of the Environment (1968–1974), B.C. Minister of Energy, Mines and Petroleum Resources (1986–1991)
William Feindel	Acadia University; Dalhousie University; McGill University	Merton	1939	Canada	Neurosurgery professor
Paul Gérin-Lajoie	University of Montreal	Pembroke	1939	Canada	Member of the National Assembly of Quebec (1960–1969)
George Grant	Queen's University at Kingston	Balliol	1939	Canada	Philosopher
Edward Hart	University of Utah	Hertford	1939	United States	English literature professor
Ted Hodgetts	University of Toronto	Corpus Christi	1939	Canada	Public administration professor
John Jay	Williams College	Magdalen	1939	United States	Ski film pioneer
William Lederman	University of Saskatchewan	Exeter	1939	Canada	Dean of Queen's University Faculty of Law (1958–1968)
Robert MacVicar	University of Wyoming; Oklahoma State University–Stillwater	Lincoln	1939	United States	Chemist; president of Oregon State University (1970–1984) and chancellor of Southern Illinois University
Thomas McGrath	University of North Dakota	New	1939	United States	Poet
Lionel McKenzie	Duke University	Oriel	1939	United States	Economics professor
Thomas McMillen	Princeton University; Harvard Law School	Magdalen	1939	United States	Judge of the United States District Court for the Northern District of Illinois (1971–1985)
Dom Mintoff	University of Malta	Hertford	1939	Malta	Prime Minister of Malta (1955–1957, 1971–1984)
Waldemar Nielsen		Brasenose	1939	United States	Expert on philanthropy and philanthropic organizations
Fabian O'Dea	Memorial University of Newfoundland; University of Toronto; Dalhousie University	Christ Church	1939	Newfoundland	Lieutenant Governor of Newfoundland (1963–1969)
Robert Roosa	University of Michigan	Magdalen	1939	United States	Economist; Under Secretary of the Treasury for Monetary Affairs (1961–1964)
Archibald Roosevelt	Harvard University	Magdalen	1939	United States	CIA officer; grandson of President Theodore Roosevelt
Erich Vermehren		Balliol	1939	Germany	Anti-Nazi agent
Claude Bertrand	University de Montreal	University	1940	Canada	Neurosurgeon
Richard Blackburn	University of Adelaide	Magdalen	1940	Australia	Chief Justice of the Australian Capital Territory (1982–1985) and Chancellor of the Australian National University (1984–1987)
James Dineen	University of New Brunswick	University	1940	Canada	Electrical engineer; president of the University of New Brunswick (1969–1972)
James Doull	Dalhousie University; University of Toronto; Harvard University	New	1940	Canada	Philosophy professor
James George	Harvard University	Christ Church	1940	Canada	Canadian Ambassador to Iran (1972–1977), Canadian High Commissioner to India (1967–1972)
Arthur Harcourt	University of Natal	Brasenose	1940	South Africa	Cricketer
Tony Honoré		New	1940	South Africa	British lawyer and legal scholar
Allan Leal	McMaster University	New	1940	Canada	Chancellor of the McMaster University (1977–1986)
Syd Newman		Exeter	1940	South Africa	England rugby union international
Ossie Newton-Thompson	University of Cape Town	Trinity	1940	South Africa	Member of South African parliament and England rugby union international
Basil Robinson	University of British Columbia	Oriel	1940	Canada	First-class cricketer for Oxford University and Canada
Basil Travers		New	1940	Australia	English rugby player
Gordon Blair	University of Saskatchewan	Exeter	1941	Canada	Member of the House of Commons of Canada (1968–1972)
Zelman Cowen	University of Melbourne	New	1941	Australia	Australian jurist and academic, Governor General of Australia (1977–1982)
Jack Rumbold	University of Canterbury	Brasenose	1941	New Zealand	Cricketer
Alan Stewart	Massey University	University	1941	New Zealand	New Zealand educator and university administrator
William Wells	University of Adelaide	Magdalen	1941	Australia	Judge of the Supreme Court of South Australia
Edwin Busuttil	University of Malta	Christ Church	1942	Malta	Speaker of the Maltese House of Representatives
Herbert Gilles	Royal University of Malta	Magdalen	1943	Malta	Physician and tropical medicine specialist
Arthur Motyer	Mount Allison University	Christ Church	1945	Bermuda	Playwright and novelist
George Cawkwell	University of Auckland	Christ Church	1946	New Zealand	Greek classicist
Francis Donovan	University of Queensland	Magdalen	1946	Australia	Australian Ambassador to the United Nations Office at Geneva (1980–1982), Australian Ambassador to the Organisation for Economic Co-operation and Development (1977–1980)
Peter Larkin	University of Saskatchewan	Exeter	1946	Canada	Fisheries scientist
Jack Ridley	University of Canterbury	University	1946	New Zealand	New Zealand civil engineer and Member of Parliament
Hugh Stretton	University of Melbourne	Balliol	1946	Australia	Historian
Tony van Ryneveld		Trinity	1946	South Africa	Cricketer
William Woodward		Brasenose	1946	Australia	Surgeon and Olympic rower
Roger Bate	California Institute of Technology; United States Military Academy	Magdalen	1947	United States	United States Air Force brigadier general
Allan Blakeney	Dalhousie Law School	Queen's	1947	Canada	Premier of Saskatchewan (1971–1982)
Paul Bohannan	University of Arizona	Queen's	1947	United States	American social anthropologist
Charles Bolté	Dartmouth College	New	1947	United States	Diplomat and activist; leader of The Five Yanks
David Candler	University of Cape Town	Keble	1947	Rhodesia	Cricketer
Guy Coté	University of Ottawa; Université Laval	St John's	1947	Canada	Filmmaker and arts administrator
James Engle	University of Chicago; Harvard University	Exeter	1947	United States	United States Ambassador to Benin (1974–1976)
Peter Fay	Harvard University	Balliol	1947	United States	Indian and Chinese history professor
Alastair Gillespie	McGill University	Queen's	1947	Canada	Canadian politician, cabinet minister
James Hester	Princeton University	Pembroke	1947	United States	First rector of the United Nations University, president of New York University
Thomas Hughes	Carleton College	Balliol	1947	United States	Director of the Bureau of Intelligence and Research (1963–1969)
George Jones	Louisiana State University	St Edmund	1947	United States	English historian
Amos Jordan	United States Military Academy	Brasenose	1947	United States	Army brigadier general
Nicholas Katzenbach	Princeton University	Balliol	1947	United States	U.S. Attorney General (1965–1966), U.S. Under-Secretary of State (1966–1969)
Spencer Kimball	University of Arizona; University of Utah	Lincoln	1947	United States	Law professor
Lovraj Kumar		Magdalen	1947	India	Civil servant
Marcel Lambert	University of Alberta	Hertford	1947	Canada	Speaker of the House of Commons (1962–1963)
Robert Marston	Virginia Military Institute	Lincoln	1947	United States	Director, National Institutes of Health (1968–1973), president of University of Florida (1974–1984)
Richard Nolte	Yale University	Queen's	1947	United States	Ambassador to the United Arab Republic and director of the Institute of Current World Affairs
Nicholas Riasanovsky	University of Oregon; Harvard University	St John's	1947	United States	Russian history professor
Bernard Rogers	United States Military Academy	University	1947	United States	American general, Supreme Allied Commander, NATO
Geoffrey Serle	University of Melbourne	University	1947	Australia	Australian academic, historian and biographer
Edgar Shannon	Washington and Lee University	Merton	1947	United States	President of the University of Virginia (1959–1974)
William Smith	Washington University	Wadham	1947	United States	United States Poet Laureate (1968–1970)
Sandy Tatum	Stanford University	Balliol	1947	United States	Golf promoter
Dudley Thompson	Mico University College	Merton	1947	Jamaica	Foreign Minister (1075–1977)
Stansfield Turner	United States Naval Academy	Exeter	1947	United States	American admiral, Director of Central Intelligence (1977–1981)
Clive van Ryneveld		University	1947	South Africa	Test cricketer and MP
William Arrowsmith	Princeton University	Queen's	1948	United States	Classicist and translator
Ronald Barnard		Brasenose	1948	Bermuda	President of the Bermuda Bar Association
William Becker	Washington University	Wadham	1948	United States	Theatre critic
Gene Brucker		Wadham	1948	United States	Historian of Renaissance-era Florence
Eugene Burdick	Stanford University	Magdalen	1948	United States	Political novelist
Guy Davenport	Duke University	Merton	1948	United States	American writer and man of letters
John Douglas	Princeton University; Yale University	Magdalen	1948	United States	United States Assistant Attorney General for the Civil Division (1963–1966)
Blair Ewing		St John's	1948	Rhodesia	MP for Lomagundi (1958–1963) and Minister of Justice and Internal Affairs (1962)
Murray Hofmeyr		Worcester	1948	South Africa	Cricketer
Piet Koornhof	Stellenbosch University	Hertford	1948	South Africa	South African Ambassador to the United States (1987–1991)
James MacDonald	Williams College; Massachusetts Institute of Technology	New	1948	United States	Engineer; winner of the 1988 IEEE Edison Medal
Malcolm McLane	Dartmouth College	Magdalen	1948	United States	Member of the New Hampshire Executive Council (1977–1982)
John McNaughton	DePauw University	Oriel	1948	United States	United States Secretary-designate of the Navy who died in a plane crash before being sworn in
Wesley Posvar	United States Military Academy	Exeter	1948	United States	Chancellor of the University of Pittsburgh (1967–1991)
Renfrey Potts	University of Adelaide	Queen's	1948	Australia	Applied mathematician, defined the Potts model
Eric Prabhakar	University of Madras	Christ Church	1948	India	Indian representative in the 1948 Olympic Games men's 100 metres
Edson Spencer	Williams College	Balliol	1948	United States	CEO of Honeywell (1974–1987)
Elmer Sprague	University of Nebraska	St Edmund	1948	United States	Professor emeritus of philosophy at Brooklyn College, City University of New York
Alan Stretton	University of Tasmania	Lincoln	1948	Australia	Civil engineer and project management academic
Leslie Woods	University of Auckland	Merton	1948	New Zealand	Mathematician
David Bergamini		Merton	1949	United States	Author
Robert Brentano		Oriel	1949	United States	Historian of medieval England and Italy
Robert Burchfield	Victoria University of Wellington	Magdalen	1949	New Zealand	New Zealand lexicographer, editor of the Oxford English Dictionary
Creighton Burns	University of Melbourne	Balliol	1949	Australia	Editor-in-chief of The Age (1981–1989)
Barney Childs	Deep Springs College; University of Nevada, Reno	Oriel	1949	United States	Avant-garde composer
Robert Clower	Washington State University	Brasenose	1949	United States	Economist
Hugh Dunn	University of Queensland	New	1949	Australia	Australian Ambassador to China (1980–1984)
Peter Durack	University of Western Australia	Lincoln	1949	Australia	Australian politician, Commonwealth Attorney General, author
Jim Greene	University of Notre Dame	Merton	1949	Newfoundland	Newfoundland and Labrador Leader of the Opposition (1960–1965)
Oliver Heyward	University of Tasmania	Oriel	1949	Australia	Bishop of Bendigo (1975–1991)
Tony Jose	University of Adelaide	Brasenose	1949	Australia	First-class cricketer
Gérard La Forest	University of New Brunswick	St John's	1949	Canada	Puisne Justice of the Supreme Court of Canada 1985–1997; CC, QC, FRSC
Steven Muller	University of California, Los Angeles	University	1949	United States	Presidents of Johns Hopkins University (1972–1990)
George Munroe	Dartmouth College	Christ Church	1949	United States	Basketball player and CEO of the Phelps Dodge Corporation
Rob Robertson-Cuninghame	University of Sydney	Trinity	1949	Australia	Chancellor of the University of New England (1981–1993)
George Rogers	Yale University	Balliol	1949	United States	Member of the Mississippi House of Representatives (1948–1952)
Lewis Salter	University of Oklahoma	Jesus	1949	United States	President of Wabash College
Harry Small	University of the Witwatersrand	St John's	1949	South Africa	England rugby union international
Reece Smith	University of South Carolina; University of Florida	Christ Church	1949	United States	Acting president of the University of South Florida (1976–1977)
Ferebee Taylor	University of North Carolina, Chapel Hill	Balliol	1949	United States	Chancellor of the University of North Carolina, Chapel Hill (1972–1980)
John Turner	University of British Columbia	Magdalen	1949	Canada	Liberal Party of Canada leader and Prime Minister of Canada, 1984
Hector Wynter	University of Havana	Exeter	1949	Jamaica	Diplomat
Peter Bailey	University of Melbourne	Corpus Christi	1950	Australia	Public servant and academic; son of Kenneth Bailey
Jim Billington	Princeton University	Balliol	1950	United States	Academic, historian, Librarian of U.S. Congress, 1987–2015
Max Bingham	University of Tasmania	Lincoln	1950	Australia	Deputy Premier of Tasmania (1982–1984), Leader of the Opposition of Tasmania (1972–1979)
John Brademas	Harvard University	Brasenose	1950	United States	Member of the U.S. House of Representatives (1959–1981), President of New York University (1981–1992)
Lionel Bryer	University of the Witwatersrand	University	1950	South Africa	Youth arts advocate
Paul-André Crépeau	University of Ottawa; University of Montreal	University	1950	Canada	Comparative law professor
Charles Davis	Davidson College	St John's	1950	United States	Medieval historian
Alan Dowding	University of Adelaide	Balliol	1950	Australia	Cricketer
Raghavan Iyer	University of Mumbai	Magdalen	1950	India	Professor of political science at the University of California, Santa Barbara (1965–1986)
Robert Massie	Yale University	Oriel	1950	United States	American historian
Bruce Rosier	University of Western Australia	Christ Church	1950	Australia	Bishop of Willochra (1970–1987)
Dennis Stanfill	United States Naval Academy	Exeter	1950	United States	Chairman and CEO of 20th Century Fox (1971–1981)
George Steiner	University of Chicago; Harvard University	Balliol	1950	United States	Literary critic
Raman Anantharaman	University of Madras	Trinity	1951	India	Indian metallurgist
Thomas Bartlett	Willamette University; Stanford University	University	1951	United States	President, American University in Cairo, 1963–1969, interim president 2002–2003; chancellor University of Alabama System, 1981–1989; chancellor State University of New York, 1994–1996
Jean Beetz	University of Montreal	Pembroke	1951	Canada	Puisne justice of the Supreme Court of Canada
David Brink	University of Tasmania	Magdalen	1951	Australia	Nuclear physicist
Julien Chouinard	Laval University	St John's	1951	Canada	Puisne Justice of the Supreme Court of Canada (1979–1987)
Kalman Cohen	Reed College	Queen's	1951	United States	Market microstructure studies scholar
Lloyd Evans	Lincoln University	Brasenose	1951	New Zealand	Plant physiologist
Richard Gardner	Harvard University	Balliol	1951	United States	U.S. Ambassador to Italy (1977–1981) and Spain (1993–1997), academic
Prosser Gifford	Yale University	Merton	1951	United States	Historian
Allan Gotlieb	University of California, Berkeley	Christ Church	1951	Canada	Canadian Ambassador to the United States (1981–1989)
Stuart Hall		Merton	1951	Jamaica	British cultural theorist
Thor Hanson		New	1951	United States	United States Navy vice admiral
Tom Harpur	University College, Toronto	Oriel	1951	Canada	Biblical scholar
Robert Harris	Wesleyan University	Balliol	1951	United States	Mayor of Ann Arbor (1969–1973)
Kenneth Keniston	Harvard University	Balliol	1951	United States	Social psychologist
Mark Kinkead-Weekes		Brasenose	1951	South Africa	Literary scholar
Walton Litz	Princeton University	Merton	1951	United States	Professor of English literature at Princeton (1956–1993), literary historian and critic, author, editor
Pat MacLachlan	University of Cape Town	Exeter	1951	Rhodesia	Scottish rugby union international
James McConica		Exeter	1951	Canada	President of the University of St. Michael's College (1984–1990) and Pontifical Institute of Mediaeval Studies (1996–2008)
Roger Opie	University of Adelaide	Christ Church	1951	Australia	Economist and political advisor
John Stone	University of Western Australia	New	1951	Australia	Secretary to the Australian Treasury 1979–1984, Senator for Queensland 1987–1990
Si Taylor	McMaster University	Balliol	1951	Canada	Chancellor of McMaster University (1991–1998)
John Arenhold		University	1952	South Africa	First-class cricketer
Staige Blackford	University of Virginia	Queen's	1952	United States	Journalist; editor of the Virginia Quarterly Review
Ramsey Bronk	Princeton University	Oriel	1952	United States	Biologist
Howard Burnett	Amherst College	Queen's	1952	United States	President of Washington and Jefferson College (1970–1998)
Rawdon Dalrymple	University of Sydney	University	1952	Australia	Australian Ambassador to Japan (1989–1993), Australian Ambassador to the United States (1985–1989), Australian Ambassador to Indonesia (1981–1985), Australian Ambassador to Israel (1972–1975)
Alain Enthoven	Stanford University	New	1952	United States	Economics professor
James Gobbo	University of Melbourne	Magdalen	1952	Australia	Victorian Supreme Court Judge and Governor of Victoria
George Goodman	Harvard University	Brasenose	1952	United States	Economics commentator
Elliott Levitas	Emory University	University	1952	United States	U.S. Congressman (Georgia), 1975–1985
James Logan	University of Kansas	Balliol	1952	United States	Tenth Circuit judge (1977–1998)
Ian Macdonald	University of Toronto	Balliol	1952	Canada	President of York University (1974–1984)
Carter Revard	University of Tulsa	Merton	1952	United States	Osage poet and scholar
John Searle	University of Wisconsin, Madison	Christ Church	1952	United States	American philosopher
Neil Smelser	Harvard University	Magdalen	1952	United States	Sociology professor
Charles Taylor	McGill University	Balliol	1952	Canada	Philosopher, winner of the Kyoto and Templeton prizes
Hugh Templeton	University of Otago	Balliol	1952	New Zealand	New Zealand diplomat, politician and member of parliament
Ronald Watts	University of Toronto	Oriel	1952	Canada	Intergovernmental relations academic
Guido Calabresi	Yale University	Magdalen	1953	United States	American legal academic, judge of the U.S. Court of Appeals for the 2nd Circuit, professor and dean at Yale Law School
Keith Conners	University of Chicago	Queen's	1953	United States	Psychologist; established the first standards for attention deficit hyperactivity disorder diagnosis
Edward de Bono	University of Malta	Christ Church	1953	Malta	Maltese writer, psychologist, author
Michael Denborough	University of Cape Town	Exeter	1953	Rhodesia	Founder of the Nuclear Disarmament Party
Ronald Dworkin	Harvard University	Magdalen	1953	United States	American legal philosopher, academic
John Evans	University of Toronto	University	1953	Canada	President of the University of Toronto 1972–1978, chairman of the Rockefeller Foundation
Bob Hawke	University of Western Australia	University	1953	Australia	President of ACTU 1969–1979, Prime Minister of Australia, 1983–1991
Otto Lang	University of Saskatchewan	Exeter	1953	Canada	Minister of Justice (1978, 1972–1975)
Bill Norrie		Queen's	1953	Canada	Mayor of Winnipeg (1979–1992)
Richard Selig	University of Washington	Magdalen	1953	United States	Poet
Duncan Stewart		Queen's	1953	New Zealand	Principal of Lady Margaret Hall (1979–1995)
Julian Thompson		Worcester	1953	South Africa	South African businessman, former chairman of De Beers and Anglo American
Robert Wells	Memorial University of Newfoundland	Keble	1953	Canada	Newfoundland and Labrador politician
Frank Wells	Pomona College	St John's	1953	United States	President of Warner Brothers (1973–1982) and The Walt Disney Company (1984–1994) until his death in a helicopter crash
Laurie Ackermann	Stellenbosch University	Worcester	1954	South Africa	Justice of the Constitutional Court of South Africa
David Alexander	Rhodes College	Christ Church	1954	United States	President of Pomona College (1969–1991)
Duncan Anderson	Melbourne University	Magdalen	1954	Australia	Australian rules footballer and first-class cricketer
Brock Brower	Dartmouth College; Harvard University	Merton	1954	United States	Magazine journalist
Norman Cantor	University of Manitoba	Oriel	1954	Canada	Canadian historian of the Middle Ages
Brian Goodwin	McGill University	Queen's	1954	Canada	Theoretical biology and biomathematics professor
Leonard Hoffmann	University of Cape Town	Queen's	1954	South Africa	UK Lord of Appeal in Ordinary
Richard Lugar	Denison University	Pembroke	1954	United States	U.S. senator (R-Ind.) 1977–2013, Aspen Strategy Group member
Denis McLean	Victoria University of Wellington	University	1954	New Zealand	New Zealand Ambassador to the United States (1991–1994)
Mancur Olson	North Dakota State University	University	1954	United States	Institutional economics professor
Ayub Ommaya	King Edward Medical University	Balliol	1954	Pakistan	American neurosurgeon; invented the Ommaya reservoir
Bob Paxton	Washington and Lee University	Merton	1954	United States	Historian, academic
Paul Sarbanes	Princeton University	Balliol	1954	United States	U.S. Senator (D-Md.) 1977–2007
Francis Slaven		Lincoln	1954	Rhodesia	Cricketer
Dale Vesser	United States Military Academy	Christ Church	1954	United States	Lieutenant general
Diogenes Allen	University of Kentucky	St John's	1955	United States	Philosopher and theologian
Donald Bruckner	Creighton University; Indiana University, Bloomington	Merton	1955	United States	Journalist
Stephen Brush	Harvard University	Magdalen	1955	United States	Historian of science
Ranjit Chaudhury	Patna University	Magdalen	1955	India	Medical scientist
John Fraser		Magdalen	1955	Canada	Ambassador to China (1971)
James Griffin	Yale University	Corpus Christi	1955	United States	Moral philosopher
Arthur Hayes	Santa Clara University	Lincoln	1955	United States	Commissioner of Food and Drugs (1981–1983)
Verdel Kolve	University of Wisconsin, Madison	Jesus	1955	United States	English literature professor
Colin Maiden	University of Auckland	Exeter	1955	New Zealand	Vice Chancellor of the University of Auckland (1971–1994)
John Morrison	University of New Mexico	University	1955	United States	Senior partner, Kirkland and Ellis (1962–1999)
Reynolds Price	Duke University	Merton	1955	United States	Poet and novelist
Ham Richardson	Tulane University	Trinity	1955	United States	Tennis player
Jaquelin Robertson	Yale College	Magdalen	1955	United States	Architect and urban designer
Peter Russell	University of Toronto	Oriel	1955	Canada	Political science professor
John Sears	Harvard University	Balliol	1955	United States	Member of the Massachusetts House of Representatives (1965–1968), Sheriff of Suffolk County, Massachusetts (1968–1969), Boston City Councilor (1980–1981), candidate for Governor of Massachusetts (1982)
Peter Serracino Inglott	University of Malta	Campion	1955	Malta	Priest, philosopher and Rector of the University of Malta (1991–1996, 1987–1988)
Robert Smit		Pembroke	1955	South Africa	Economist and murder victim
Robert Solomon	University of Sydney	Wadham	1955	Australia	Member of the Australian Parliament (1969–1972)
Johan Steyn	Stellenbosch University	University	1955	South Africa	UK Lord of Appeal in Ordinary
Gilbert Strang	Massachusetts Institute of Technology	Balliol	1955	United States	MIT maths professor
Ian Wilson	University of Adelaide	Magdalen	1955	Australia	Solicitor, company director, former Australian politician, Minister for Home Affairs and Environment, Minister for Aboriginal Affairs
Walter Young	University of British Columbia	St John's	1955	Canada	Political scientist
Viru Dayal	Delhi University	University	1956	India	Indian Administrative Service and United Nations officer; served as Chef de Cabinet to Secretary-General of the United Nations
Thomas De Koninck	Laval University	St John's	1956	Canada	Canadian Philosopher
Michael Hammond	Lawrence University; Delhi University	Oriel	1956	United States	Chair of the National Endowment for the Arts
Anthony King	Queen's University, Kingston	Magdalen	1956	Canada	Psephology professor
Arthur Kroeger	University of Alberta	Pembroke	1956	Canada	Canadian civil servant and diplomat, chancellor of Carleton University, 1993–2002
Russell McCormmach	Washington State College	Christ Church	1956	United States	Historian of physics
Geoff Miller		Corpus Christi	1956	Australia	Australian High Commissioner to New Zealand (1996–2000), Australian Ambassador to Japan (1986–1989), Director-general of the Office of National Assessments (1989–1995), Australian Ambassador to South Korea (1978–1980)
Willie Morris	University of Texas, Austin	New	1956	United States	Author, editor of Harper's Magazine (1967–1971)
Lionel Opie	University of Cape Town	Lincoln	1956	South Africa	Cardiologist; president of the International Society for Heart Research
Robert Pirie	United States Naval Academy	Magdalen	1956	United States	Acting United States Secretary of the Navy (2001)
Ted Pocock	University of Adelaide	Balliol	1956	Australia	Ambassador to South Korea (1980–1984), the Soviet Union (1984–1987), France (1987–1991), Pakistan (1991–1992), and Belgium (1992–1997)
Neil Rudenstine	Princeton University	New	1956	United States	Scholar of Renaissance literature; President of Harvard University (1991–2001)
Ainslie Sheil	University of Queensland	Balliol	1956	Australia	Rugby union international
Edwin Yoder	University of North Carolina, Chapel Hill	Jesus	1956	United States	Pulitzer-winning journalist
Ranjit Bhatia		Jesus	1957	India	Indian Olympic athlete
Bob Bilger	University of Auckland	Exeter	1957	New Zealand	Engineer
Neal Blewett	University of Tasmania	Jesus	1957	Australia	Australian academic, professor of politics, politician, cabinet minister, UK High Commissioner
Glen Bowersock	Harvard University	Balliol	1957	United States	Ancient historian
Antonio Gotto	Vanderbilt University	Worcester	1957	United States	Dean of the Weill Medical College at Cornell University
Erich Gruen	Columbia University	Merton	1957	United States	Austrian-American classical scholar
Roger Hansen		Magdalen	1957	United States	Political scientist
Roy Hofheinz	Rice University	Exeter	1957	United States	Sinologist
Edward Nell	Princeton University	Magdalen	1957	United States	Economics professor
Rex Nettleford	University of the West Indies	Oriel	1957	Jamaica	Vice-chancellor of the University of the West Indies, author, dance director
Richard Pfaff	Harvard College	Magdalen	1957	United States	Scholar of medieval English liturgy
Robert Rotberg	Princeton University	University	1957	United States	American political scientist
Aaron Sloman	University of Cape Town	Balliol	1957	South Africa	Philosopher, AI researcher, cognitive scientist
Thomas Baxter	University of Queensland	Balliol	1958	Australia	Engineer and rugby union international
Peter Blaikie	Bishop's University	St John's	1958	Canada	Lawyer
Alexander Fetter	Williams College	Balliol	1958	United States	Applied physics professor
John Fleming	University of the South	Jesus	1958	United States	American literary critic and professor of literature and comparative literature at Princeton University
Yves Fortier	University of Montreal; McGill University	Magdalen	1958	Canada	Canadian Ambassador to the United Nations (1988–1991)
Lawrence Hartmann	Harvard University	Merton	1958	United States	Psychiatrist and professor; President, American Psychiatric Association, 1991–1992
Samuel Holt	Princeton University	Christ Church	1958	United States	Broadcasting executive; Coordinator of Programming of PBS
Dick Howard	University of Richmond	Christ Church	1958	United States	Legal scholar
Roger Howell	Bowdoin College	St John's	1958	United States	10th president of Bowdoin College (1968–1978), professor and scholar of British history at Bowdoin, author of several books on British history specializing in Tudor and Stuart England
Jonathan Kozol	Harvard University	Magdalen	1958	United States	American writer and social activist
Kris Kristofferson	Pomona College	Merton	1958	United States	American singer-songwriter and actor, starred in Amerika (1987)
Mani Malhoutra	Delhi University	Balliol	1958	India	Assistant secretary-general of the Commonwealth
Jason McManus	Davidson College	New	1958	United States	Editor-in-chief of Time Inc. (1987–1994)
Mervyn Morris	University of the West Indies	St Edmund	1958	Jamaica	Jamaican poet and professor emeritus at University of the West Indies; recipient of the Jamaican Order of Merit; Poet Laureate of Jamaica
Eugene Nassar	Yale School of Medicine; Kenyon College	Worcester	1958	United States	Literary critic
Joseph Nye	Princeton University	Exeter	1958	United States	American political scientist; chairman National Intelligence Council (1993–1994); ASD for International Security Affairs (1994–1995); dean, Kennedy School of Government, Harvard
David Vere-Jones	Victoria University College	Magdalen	1958	New Zealand	Statistician and earthquake forecasting expert
Stephen Clarkson	University of Toronto	New	1959	Canada	Political economy professor
Pete Dawkins	United States Military Academy	Brasenose	1959	United States	Heisman Trophy winner, Brigadier General, US Army (Ret. 1983), chairman and CEO of Diversified Distribution Services, Travelers Group
Bernie Dunlap	University of the South	Wadham	1959	United States	President of Wofford College (2000–2013)
Michael Fried	Princeton University	Merton	1959	United States	American art historian and critic
John Helliwell	University of British Columbia	St John's	1959	Canada	Economist
Thomas Hill	Harvard University	University	1959	United States	Philosophy professor
Brad Hosmer	United States Air Force Academy	Exeter	1959	United States	U.S. Air Force lieutenant general and Superintendent of the United States Air Force Academy (1991–1994)
Rhys Isaac	University of Cape Town	Balliol	1959	South Africa	Australian historian of the United States
Don Mathieson	Victoria University of Wellington	University	1959	New Zealand	Lawyer
Richard Merrill	Columbia University	Christ Church	1959	United States	Lawyer and government official; Dean of the University of Virginia School of Law (1980–1988)
Desmond Morton	Royal Military College of Canada	Keble	1959	Canada	Historian and author
David Pithey	University of Cape Town	St Edmund	1959	Rhodesia	Rhodesian-born South African cricketer, 1963–67
Richard Rubenstein	Harvard University	Balliol	1959	United States	Conflict resolution professor
Deane Terrell	University of Adelaide	Magdalen	1959	Australia	Econometrician and vigneron, vice-chancellor ANU 1994–2000, chairman AARNET Pty Ltd 2002–, CEO Quarry Hill Wines 2000–
Frank von Hippel		Magdalen	1959	United States	Physicist
Gordon Wasserman	McGill University	New	1959	Canada	British civil servant; member of the House of Lords (2011–present)
John Womack	Harvard University	Merton	1959	United States	Economist and historian of Mexico
Shahid Burki	Government College University, Lahore	Christ Church	1960	Pakistan	Economist, Finance Minister of Pakistan
Dick Celeste	Yale University	Exeter	1960	United States	Governor of Ohio (1983–1991), director of the Peace Corps, U.S. Ambassador to India, president of Colorado College
Robert Darnton	Harvard University	St John's	1960	United States	18th-century French cultural historian
Davis Earle	University of British Columbia	University	1960	Canada	Canadian physicist
Leslie Epstein	Yale University	Merton	1960	United States	Novelist and essayist
John Grinalds	United States Military Academy	Brasenose	1960	United States	United States Marine Corps major general, Presidents of The Citadel (1997–2005)
Lebrecht Hesse	University of Ghana	Oriel	1960	Ghana	First black African Rhodes Scholar, director-general, Ghana Broadcasting Corporation (GBC), 1972–1974; 1984–1988 and member, Public Services Commission of Ghana
Julian Jack	University of Otago	Magdalen	1960	New Zealand	Physiologist
Girish Karnad	Karnatak University	Magdalen	1960	India	Indian Kannada-language playwright, film actor and director, screenwriter
Martin Legassick		Balliol	1960	South Africa	Historian and Marxist activist
David Malcolm	University of Western Australia	Wadham	1960	Australia	Lieutenant Governor of Western Australia (1990–2009), Chief Justice of Western Australia (1988–2006)
Charles Maynes	Harvard University	Merton	1960	United States	Assistant Secretary of State for International Organization Affairs (1977–1980)
Matthew Nimetz	Williams College	Balliol	1960	United States	Counselor of the United States Department of State (1977–1980) and Under Secretary of State for International Security Affairs (1980)
Tim Reid	University of Toronto; Yale University	Christ Church	1960	Canada	Ontario MPP for Scarborough East (1967–1971)
Lester Thurow	Williams College	Balliol	1960	United States	American economist and author, professor of economics at MIT
Thomas Vargish	Columbia University	Merton	1960	United States	Scholar of English literature
Frank Berman	University of Cape Town	Wadham	1961	South Africa	Legal Adviser to the Foreign and Commonwealth Office (1991–1999)
Graham Bond	University of Queensland	Balliol	1961	Australia	Olympic gymnast
Angus Cameron	Mount Allison University	Jesus	1961	Canada	Lexicographer
Brian Daley	Fordham University	Merton	1961	United States	Theologian and patristics expert
Neil De Marchi	University of Western Australia	Christ Church	1961	Australia	Economist and historian of economic thought
David Eisenberg	Harvard University	Queen's	1961	United States	Biochemist and biophysicist
Peter Garnsey	University of Sydney	New	1961	Australia	Classicist
Howard Graves	United States Military Academy	St John's	1961	United States	Superintendents of the United States Military Academy (1991–1996), Chancellors of the Texas A&M University System (1999–2003), U.S. Army lieutenant general
William Hartmann	Iowa State University	Lincoln	1961	United States	Psychoacoustician; president of the Acoustical Society of America
Murray McLachlan		Wadham	1961	South Africa	Olympic swimmer (1960)
Robert O'Neill	Royal Military College, Duntroon	Brasenose	1961	Australia	Historian; Chichele Professor of the History of War (1987–2000) and director of the International Institute for Strategic Studies
Willie Pietersen	Rhodes University	University	1961	South Africa	Management professor
Antony Polonsky	University of the Witwatersrand	Worcester	1961	South Africa	Historian of the Holocaust and of Polish Jews
Arthur Scace	University of Toronto; Harvard University	Corpus Christi	1961	Canada	Lawyer; treasurer of the Law Society of Upper Canada (1986–1987)
Henry Shue		Merton	1961	United States	Philosopher
David Souter	Harvard University	Magdalen	1961	United States	Associate Justice of the U.S. Supreme Court, 1990–2009
Denis Stairs	Dalhousie University	Exeter	1961	Canada	Political scientist
Lawrence Wilkinson	Brigham Young University	Jesus	1961	United States	Attorney General of Utah (1981–1989)
Henry Wong	University of the West Indies	Wadham	1961	Jamaica	Physicist
Eric Abrahams	University of the West Indies	St Peter's	1962	Jamaica	Member of the Parliament of Jamaica (1980–1989, 1977–1978)
Ed Berman	Harvard University	Exeter	1962	United States	Playwright
Brian De Garis		Wadham	1962	Australia	Western Australia historian
Rory Donnellan		Magdalen	1962	South Africa	Cricketer
John Finnis	University of Adelaide	University	1962	Australia	Legal philosophy professor
James Fox	Harvard University	University	1962	United States	Indonesian anthropologist and historian
David Frohnmayer	Harvard University	Wadham	1962	United States	President of the University of Oregon, 1994–; Attorney General of Oregon, 1980–1991
Wieland Gevers	University of Cape Town	Balliol	1962	South Africa	Biochemist; president of the Royal Society of South Africa and Academy of Science of South Africa
Bryan Gould	University of Auckland	Balliol	1962	New Zealand	New Zealand-born British politician, academic, vice-chancellor of University of Waikato
Russell Hardin	University of Texas at Austin	Jesus	1962	United States	Political scientist
David Hodgson	University of Sydney	University	1962	Australia	Australian judge
Ian Jones	Stellenbosch University	Queen's	1962	South Africa	Welsh rugby union international
Shaukat Khan	University of the Punjab	Brasenose	1962	Pakistan	Rector, GIK Institute, Director General Pakistan Atomic Energy Commission, Pride of Performance Recipient
John Kirby	Fordham University	Merton	1962	United States	Attorney; defended Nintendo in Universal City Studios, Inc. v. Nintendo Co., Ltd. and namesake of the Kirby video game franchise
Don Melrose	University of Western Australia; University of Tasmania	Exeter	1962	Australia	Theoretical astrophysics professor
Richard Portes	Yale University	Balliol	1962	United States	Founding president of the Centre for Economic Policy Research
Wilfrid Prest	University of Melbourne	New	1962	Australia	Legal historian
David Schindler	North Dakota State University	St Catherine's	1962	United States	Limnologist
Norman Webster	Bishop's University	St John's	1962	Canada	Journalist and an editor-in-chief of The Globe and Mail and the Montreal Gazette
Anthony Ardington		Corpus Christi	1963	South Africa	Businessman and cricketer
David Boren	Yale University	Balliol	1963	United States	Governor of Oklahoma 1975–1979, U.S. senator (D-Ok.) 1979–1994, president of the University of Oklahoma 1994–2018
Josiah Bunting	Virginia Military Institute	Christ Church	1963	United States	President of Hampden-Sydney College (1977–1987)
George Butterfield	Trinity College, Toronto	St Peter's	1963	Bermuda	Philanthropist
Sheldon Chumir	University of Alberta	Brasenose	1963	Canada	Lawyer, member of Legislative Assembly of Province of Alberta
John Eekelaar	King's College London	University	1963	South Africa	Family law professor
Gerry Godsoe		St John's	1963	Canada	Lawyer; president and CEO of Nova Scotia Power
Marcel Massé	McGill University	Pembroke	1963	Canada	Canadian civil servant and politician; clerk of the Queen's Privy Council for Canada, president of the Treasury Board and member of cabinet
John McDowell	University College of Rhodesia and Nyasaland	New	1963	Rhodesia	South African philosopher
Joe Romig	University of Colorado	Wadham	1963	United States	Football player; two-time College Football All-American (1960 and 1961) UPI Lineman of the Year (1961)
Walter Slocombe	Princeton University	Balliol	1963	United States	U.S. Under Secretary of Defense for Policy (1994–2001), senior adviser for national defense for the Coalition Provisional Authority in Baghdad (2003), Aspen Strategy Group member
Andy Sundberg	United States Naval Academy	New	1963	United States	Advocate for overseas Americans
Allan Taylor	University of Tasmania	Balliol	1963	Australia	Director-General of the Australian Secret Intelligence Service (1998–2003)
Michel Vennat	Jean de Brébeuf College; University of Montreal	Merton	1963	Canada	President of the Business Development Bank of Canada
Sam Westbrook	United States Air Force Academy	Trinity	1963	United States	United States Air Force major general
John Wideman	University of Pennsylvania	New	1963	United States	American writer, two-time recipient of PEN/Faulkner award
James Woolsey	Stanford University	St John's	1963	United States	Director of Central Intelligence Agency (1993–1995), core member of the Project for the New American Century (1997–), senior vice president at Booz Allen Hamilton (2002–)
Montek Ahluwalia	Delhi University	Magdalen	1964	India	Indian economist, first independent evaluator of the International Monetary Fund, Deputy Chairman of the Planning Commission
David Baragwanath	University of Auckland	Balliol	1964	New Zealand	President of the United Nations Special Tribunal for Lebanon (2011–2015)
Bruce Bennett		Pembroke	1964	Australia	Scholar of Australian literature
Robin Boadway	Royal Military College of Canada	Exeter	1964	Canada	Canadian economist and author
Bowman Cutter	Harvard University; Princeton University	Balliol	1964	United States	Economist and businessman
Graeme Davison	University of Melbourne	Balliol	1964	Australia	Urban historian; Sir John Monash Distinguished Professor in the School of Historical Studies
Francis Fox		Trinity	1964	Canada	MP (1972–1984), Secretary of State for Canada (1980–1981), and Senator (2005–2011)
Thomas Gerrity	Massachusetts Institute of Technology	Merton	1964	United States	Management professor
Dyson Heydon	University of Sydney	University	1964	Australia	High Court judge of Australia
Bill Johnson	University of Natal	Magdalen	1964	South Africa	Journalist
Breon Mitchell	University of Kansas	University	1964	United States	Translator of German literature
Larry Pressler	University of South Dakota	St Edmund	1964	United States	American politician, U.S. Congressman (R-S.D.) 1975–1979, U.S. senator (R-S.D.) 1979–1997, authored the Telecommunications Act of 1996
Bill Rowe	Memorial University of Newfoundland; University of New Brunswick	Brasenose	1964	Canada	Newfoundland and Labrador Leader of the Opposition (1977–1979)
Wasim Sajjad	University of the Punjab	Wadham	1964	Pakistan	Acting president of Pakistan (1997–1998, 1993), chairman of the Senate (1988–1999)
Gus Speth	Yale University	Balliol	1964	United States	Administrator of the United Nations Development Programme, 1993–1999, Dean of School of Forestry and Environmental Studies, Yale
Ralph Walker	McGill University	Balliol	1964	Canada	British philosopher, head of Humanities Division at the University of Oxford 2000–2006
Jon Westling	Reed College	St John's	1964	United States	President of Boston University (1996–2002)
Gavin Williams	University of Stellenbosch	Trinity	1964	South Africa	Sociologist and economist
Peter Wood	Harvard University	Merton	1964	United States	Historian
John Adams	Royal Military College of Canada	St Peter's	1965	Canada	Chief of the Communications Security Establishment Canada (2005–2012)
Danilo Bach		Corpus Christi	1965	United States	Screenwriter and film producer
Tommy Bedford	University of Natal	St Edmund	1965	South Africa	South African Rugby Union player 1963–71
Bill Bradley	Princeton University	Worcester	1965	United States	American politician, NBA star, U.S. Senator (D-N.J.) 1979–1997, and Democratic presidential candidate, 2000
George Cooper		University	1965	Canada	MP for Halifax (1979–1980) and President of University of King's College (2012–2016)
Richard Danzig	Reed College; Yale University	Magdalen	1965	United States	U.S. Under Secretary of the Navy (1993–1997), U.S. Secretary of the Navy (1998–2001)
Modris Eksteins	University of Toronto; Heidelberg University	St Antony's	1965	Canada	Modern German cultural historian
Brian Fay	Loyola University of Los Angeles	St Edmund	1965	United States	Philosopher of social sciences
Fred Goldstein		St Edmund	1965	Rhodesia	Cricketer
Ben Heineman	Harvard College	Balliol	1965	United States	Legal scholar and journalist
Alex Potts	University of Toronto	University of Oxford	1965	Canada	Art Historian
Giles Ridley		Pembroke	1965	Rhodesia	English first-class cricketer
John Ritch	United States Military Academy	University	1965	United States	United States Ambassador to the United Nations International Organizations in Vienna (1993–2001), and head, World Nuclear Association, 2001–2012
Aftab Seth	Delhi University	Christ Church	1965	India	Indian Ambassador to Japan
Philip Slayton		Exeter	1965	Canada	Law academic
Daryl Williams	University of Western Australia	Wadham	1965	Australia	Australian politician, Liberal member of the House of Representatives, 1993–2004, attorney-general of Australia 1996–2003
John Bergeron	McGill University	Worcester	1966	Canada	Canadian cell biologist, CQ, FRSC
Glenn Black	University of Cape Town	Trinity	1966	South Africa	Scholar of Renaissance literature
Michael Bonello	University of Malta	St Edmund	1966	Malta	Governor of the Central Bank of Malta, 1999–
Andrew Brook	University of Alberta	Queen's	1966	Canada	Canadian philosopher
Ashton Calvert	University of Tasmania	New	1966	Australia	Australian Ambassador to Japan (1993–1998), secretary of the Department of Foreign Affairs and Trade (1998–2005)
Ian Clark	University of British Columbia	Magdalen	1966	Canada	Civil servant and education academic
Wesley Clark	United States Military Academy	Magdalen	1966	United States	United States Army general, Supreme Allied Commander, North Atlantic Treaty Organization, 1997–2000; Democratic presidential candidate, 2004
Jonathan Culler	Harvard University	St John's	1966	United States	Comparative English literature professor
Paresh Dandona		Magdalen	1966	India	American physician
Curt Hessler	Harvard College	Balliol	1966	United States	Assistant Secretary of the Treasury for Economic Policy (1980–1981)
David Kendall	Wabash College	Worcester	1966	United States	President Clinton's personal lawyer
Terrence Malick	Harvard University	Magdalen	1966	United States	Film director of Days of Heaven, The Thin Red Line, Badlands, The New World, and The Tree of Life
Douglas McArthur	University of Saskatchewan	Exeter	1966	Canada	Saskatchewan MLA for Regina Lakeview (1978–1982)
Trevor Munroe	University of the West Indies	New	1966	Jamaica	Political scientist
Wilson Parasiuk	University of Manitoba	St John's	1966	Canada	Canadian member of the Manitoba Legislative Assembly, Minister of Energy and Mines with responsibility for Manitoba Hydro, Minister of Health, 1977–1988; private/public sector entrepreneur, 1989–present
Prabhat Patnaik	St. Stephen's College, Delhi	Balliol	1966	India	Marxist economist
Samuel Shem	Harvard University	Balliol	1966	United States	Psychiatrist
Michael Spence	Princeton University	Magdalen	1966	Canada	Nobel Memorial Prize in Economic Sciences recipient (2001)
Michael Teitelbaum	Reed College	St Catherine's	1966	United States	Vice President of the Alfred P. Sloan Foundation
Richard Tsien	Massachusetts Institute of Technology	Wadham	1966	United States	Electrical engineer and neurobiologist
Charles Abbot	United States Naval Academy	New	1967	United States	United States Navy admiral
Tom Allen	Bowdoin College	Wadham	1967	United States	American politician, U.S. Congressman (Maine), 1997–2009
John Doyle	University of Adelaide	Magdalen	1967	Australia	Chief Justice of the Supreme Court of South Australia (1995–2012)
Peter Edwards	University of Western Australia	Wadham	1967	Australia	Diplomatic and military historian
David Hardesty	West Virginia University	Queen's	1967	United States	President of West Virginia University (1995–2007)
Karl Marlantes	Yale University	University	1967	United States	American author of Matterhorn: A Novel of the Vietnam War
Deepak Nayyar	Delhi University	Balliol	1967	India	Vice chancellor of Delhi University
Steve Oxman	Princeton University	New	1967	United States	U.S. assistant secretary of state for European and Canadian affairs, 1993–1994, president of the board of trustees of Princeton University, 2006–
Peter Wilson	University of Cape Town	St Edmund	1967	Rhodesia	Cricketer
Alan Bersin	Harvard University	Balliol	1968	United States	Acting commissioner of Customs and Border Protection (2010–2011)
Dennis Blair	United States Naval Academy	Worcester	1968	United States	Retired four-star admiral, former director of National Intelligence (2009–2010), president of the Institute for Defense Analyses and former commander-in-chief of U.S. Pacific Command (1999–2002)
Colin Bundy	University of the Witwatersrand	Merton	1968	South Africa	Vice chancellor University of the Witwatersrand (1997–2001); deputy vice chancellor University of London (2003–06); Warden Green College (2006–08); Principal Green Templeton College (2008–)
Mike Burton		Mansfield	1968	Rhodesia	Cricketer
Peter Cameron	University of Queensland	Balliol	1968	Australia	Mathematician, academic
Bill Clinton	Georgetown University	University	1968	United States	President of the United States (1993–2001), Governor of Arkansas (1979–1981, 1983–1993)
Peter Conrad	University of Tasmania	New	1968	Australia	Academic (English literature)
Robert Earl	United States Naval Academy	Exeter	1968	United States	United States Department of Defense official
William Fletcher	Harvard University	Merton	1968	United States	Judge of the U.S. Court of Appeals for the 9th Circuit
Richard French	University of British Columbia	Magdalen	1968	Canada	Quebec MNA for Westmount (1981–1989)
Bo Jones	Harvard University	Exeter	1968	United States	Vice chairman of The Washington Post Company, former publisher and CEO of The Washington Post (2000–2008)
Chris Laidlaw	University of Otago	Merton	1968	New Zealand	New Zealand All Black, diplomat, MP, talk radio host, author, Human Rights Commissioner and Race Relations Conciliator
Robert McCallum	Yale University	Christ Church	1968	United States	American lawyer, U.S. Associate Attorney General, 2003–
David Millener	University of Auckland	St Catherine's	1968	New Zealand	Cricketer
Rex Murphy	Memorial University of Newfoundland	St Edmund	1968	Canada	Canadian political commentator
G. L. Peiris	University of Colombo	University	1968	Ceylon	Sri Lankan politician, 11th minister of foreign affairs of Sri Lanka, 2010–present
Jack Pratt	Vanderbilt University	Balliol	1968	United States	Dean of the University of South Carolina School of Law (2006–2011)
Robert Reich	Dartmouth College	University	1968	United States	American commentator and author, U.S. Secretary of Labor (1993–1997), Chancellor's professor at the Goldman School of Public Policy at the University of California, Berkeley (2006–)
David Satter	University of Chicago	Balliol	1968	United States	Russian and Soviet issues journalist
Richard Stearns	Stanford University	Balliol	1968	United States	Judge of the United States District Court for the District of Massachusetts (1993–present)
Strobe Talbott	Yale University	Magdalen	1968	United States	American diplomat and journalist, U.S. Deputy Secretary of State (1994–2001), president of the Brookings Institution (2002–), Aspen Strategy Group member
Ronald Thwaites	Cornell University	Campion	1968	Jamaica	Education Minister (2012–2016)
Timothy Woods	Rhodes University	University	1968	South Africa	Headmaster of Gresham's School (1982–1985)
Jim Amoss	Yale University	St John's	1969	United States	Editor of The Times-Picayune
Randall Caudill	College of the Holy Cross; Yale University	Worcester	1969	United States	Businessman
Tom Cloete	Rhodes University	Trinity	1969	South Africa	Judge of the Supreme Court (1991–2002) and of the Supreme Court of Appeal (2003–2013)
David Freedberg	University of Cape Town; Yale University	Balliol	1969	South Africa	Art history professor
Kenneth Hayne	University of Melbourne	Exeter	1969	Australia	Australian jurist: Supreme Court of Victoria (1992–95); Court of Appeals division of the Supreme Court of Victoria (1995–97); puisne justice of the High Court of Australia (1997–)
Ira Magaziner	Brown University	Balliol	1969	United States	White House senior aide (1993–1999), originator of ICANN
Selwyn Maister	University of Canterbury	Magdalen	1969	New Zealand	New Zealand Olympic field hockey player (1976)
Barry May	University of Cape Town	Brasenose	1969	Rhodesia	English cricketer
Michael Ponsor	Harvard University	Pembroke	1969	United States	Judge of the United States District Court for the District of Massachusetts (1994–2011)
Roger Porter	Brigham Young University	Queen's	1969	United States	Harvard professor of business and government, senior scholar at the Wilson Center, senior economic advisor to presidents Ford, Reagan, and Bush
Bob Rae	University of Toronto	Balliol	1969	Canada	Permanent Representative (Ambassador) of Canada to the United Nations, Canadian politician, former premier of Ontario
Kurt Schork	University of Jamestown	Merton	1969	United States	War correspondent
Danny Williams	Memorial University of Newfoundland	Keble	1969	Canada	Lawyer and businessman, Canadian politician, Premier of Newfoundland and Labrador
David Williams	Victoria University of Wellington	Balliol	1969	New Zealand	New Zealand barrister, solicitor and academic
Bruce Boucher	Harvard University	Magdalen	1970	United States	American art historian and curator; Deborah Loeb Brice Director of Sir John Soane's Museum
Bruce Cain	Bowdoin College	Trinity	1970	United States	American politics professor
Heyward Dotson	Columbia University	Worcester	1970	United States	American professional basketball player, attorney, and civil servant
Jim Fallows	Harvard University	Queen's	1970	United States	American writer (The Atlantic Monthly)
Louis Grech		Balliol	1970	Malta	Deputy Prime Minister of Malta (2013–2017)
Derek Green		Wadham	1970	Canada	Chief Justice of the Supreme Court of Newfoundland and Labrador
Dennis Hutchinson	Bowdoin College	Magdalen	1970	United States	Law professor
Kent Keith	Harvard University	Oriel	1970	United States	Writer
Susan Kippax	University of Sydney	Lady Margaret	1970	Australia	Social psychology professor
David Painter	King University	Lincoln	1970	United States	Cold War history professor
Gyanendra Pandey	St. Stephen's College, Delhi	Balliol	1970	India	Historian and member of Subaltern Studies
Greg Petsko	Princeton University	Merton	1970	United States	Biochemist
David Quammen	Yale University	Merton	1970	United States	American science, nature and travel writer
Eric Redman	Harvard University	Magdalen	1970	United States	Staffer, US senator Warren G. Magnuson (ca.1971); author, The Dance of Legislation (1973, 2000); lawyer and businessman
David Ritchie	University of Queensland	Worcester	1970	Australia	Ambassador to Indonesia (2003–2005), France (2008–2011), Italy (2010–2013), and Germany (2013–2016)
Geoffrey Robertson	University of Sydney	University	1970	Australia	Barrister and international human rights activist
Charles Shanor	Rice University	Christ Church	1970	United States	Law professor
Patrick Shea	Stanford University	New	1970	United States	Chair of the Utah Democratic Party and 1994 Senate nominee
Rick Trainor	Brown University; Princeton University	Merton	1970	United States	Principal of King's College London
Peter Adams	University of Canterbury	New	1971	New Zealand	Ambassador to China (1998–2001) and executive director of the New Zealand Agency for International Development (2001–2009)
James Atlas	Harvard University	New	1971	United States	American writer (The New Yorker)
Joe Badaracco	Saint Louis University	Pembroke	1971	United States	Business ethics professor
John Baldwin	Harvard University	Magdalen	1971	United States	Cardiac surgeon and professor
Akeel Bilgrami	University of Mumbai	Balliol	1971	India	Philosopher
Jon Borwein	University of Western Ontario	Jesus	1971	Canada	Experimental mathematics professor
Etienne de Villiers	University of Pretoria	Trinity	1971	South Africa	Sports investor
John Gaventa	Vanderbilt University	Balliol	1971	United States	Sociologist
Stuart Hamilton	University of Tasmania	Magdalen	1971	Australia	Secretary of the Department of the Environment, Sport and Territories (1993–1996), Secretary of the Department of Health, Housing and Community Services (1991–1993), Secretary of the Department of Community Services and Health (1988–1991)
Rick Lee	University of Sydney	Worcester	1971	Australia	Cricketer
John Luik		Hertford	1971	United States	Senior Fellow at the Democracy Institute
Chris Mann	University of the Witwatersrand	St Edmund	1971	South Africa	South African poet, professor of poetry at Rhodes University
Thomas Merrill	Grinnell College	Magdalen	1971	United States	Law professor
Andrew Murray	Rhodes University	Oriel	1971	South Africa	Member of the Australian Senate (1996–2008)
Roland Paver		Pembroke	1971	South Africa	Cricketer
Paul Rahe	Yale University	Wadham	1971	United States	American classicist and historian
Frank Raines	Harvard University	Magdalen	1971	United States	Chairman and CEO of Fannie Mae, 1999–2004; director of the Office of Management and Budget, 1996–1998
Tom Sancton	Harvard University	Balliol	1971	United States	American journalist (TIME, Vanity Fair), author, musician
Kurt Schmoke	Yale University	Balliol	1971	United States	Mayor of Baltimore, 1987–1999; dean of Howard University School of Law
Tom Birmingham	Harvard University	Exeter	1972	United States	President of the Massachusetts Senate, candidate for Democratic nomination for Governor of Massachusetts, 2002
Dan Clodfelter	Davidson College	Corpus Christi	1972	United States	North Carolina State Senator (1999–2014) and Mayor of Charlotte (2014–2015)
Christopher Cordner		University	1972	Australia	Philosophy professor
Keith Ellison	Harvard University	Magdalen	1972	United States	Judge of the United States District Court for the Southern District of Texas (1999–present)
Mervyn Frost	Stellenbosch University	University	1972	South Africa	Political scientist; head of Department of War Studies, King's College London (2007–2013)
Geoff Gallop	University of Western Australia	St John's	1972	Australia	Academic, Premier of Western Australia, 2001–2006
Lane Hughston		Magdalen	1972	United States	Mathematician
Mike Kinsley	Harvard University	Magdalen	1972	United States	American journalist (Los Angeles Times), founder of Slate magazine, editor of The New Republic
Alan Morinis		Magdalen	1972	Canada	Musar movement figure
Gowher Rizvi	University of Dhaka	Trinity	1972	Pakistan	Bangladeshi historian and political advisor; International Affairs Advisor to the Prime Minister of Bangladesh (2009–2023; 2024–present)
David Skegg	University of Otago	Balliol	1972	New Zealand	President of the Royal Society of New Zealand (2012–2015), cancer epidemiology professor
Nick Spaeth	Stanford University	New	1972	United States	Attorney General of North Dakota (1985–1992)
Geza Tatrallyay	Harvard University	St Catherine's	1972	Canada	Fencer and author
Wilf Wedmann	Simon Fraser University	Merton	1972	Canada	Olympic high jumper and 1971 Pan American Games silver medalist
Robert Luskin	Harvard University	New	1972	United States	International lawyer
Kim Beazley	University of Western Australia	Balliol	1973	Australia	Australian politician, former deputy prime minister of Australia and Leader of the Opposition, Australian ambassador to the United States
Paul Blustein		Merton	1973	United States	Economic journalist and author
Raymond Burse	Centre College	St John's	1973	United States	President of Kentucky State University (1982–1989 and 2014–2016)
Delroy Chuck	University of the West Indies	St Catherine's	1973	Jamaica	Speaker of the House of Representatives (2007–2011) and Ministry of Justice (2011–2012; 2022–present)
Eugene Dionne	Harvard University	Balliol	1973	United States	American journalist and Washington Post columnist (1993–), senior fellow at Brookings Institution, and commentator on NPR, MSNBC, and PBS
Peter Gross	University of Cape Town	Oriel	1973	South Africa	Senior Presiding Judge for England and Wales (2013–2015)
Richard Haass	Oberlin College	Wadham	1973	United States	President of the Council on Foreign Relations (2003–present), director of the Policy Planning (2001–2003)
Chris Hendrickson	Stanford University	Balliol	1973	United States	Environmental engineer
Robert Joy	Memorial University of Newfoundland	Corpus Christi	1973	Canada	Actor
Frank Klotz	United States Air Force Academy	Trinity	1973	United States	U.S. Air Force lieutenant general, first commander Air Force Global Strike Command
Brian Morgan	Trinity College, Toronto	Balliol	1973	Canada	Lawyer
Misha Petkevich	Harvard University	Magdalen	1973	United States	Olympic figure skater
Mike Robinson		University	1973	Canada	President and CEO of the Glenbow Museum
Peter Sacks	University of Natal; Princeton University	New	1973	South Africa	Painter
Richard Sauber	Yale University; New York University School of Law	Lincoln	1973	United States	General Counsel of the Department of Veterans Affairs (2021–2022)
Alex Trigona	University of Malta	Oriel	1973	Malta	Foreign Minister of Malta 1981–1987
Nick Allard	Princeton University	Merton	1974	United States	Dean and President of Brooklyn Law School
T. A. Barron	Princeton University	Balliol	1974	United States	Author, conservationist, and documentary film producer
Vir Chauhan		St Catherine's	1974	India	Geneticist and biotechnologist; 2012 Padma Shri recipient
C. Edward Coffey	Wofford College	St. John's	1974	United States	Physician (Neuropsychiatrist) and healthcare leader
Roger Davis	University of Sydney	Pembroke	1974	Australia	Rugby union international; chairman of Bank of Queensland (2013–2019) and of New South Wales Rugby Union
Rod Eddington	University of Western Australia	Lincoln	1974	Australia	Former CEO of British Airways, director of News Corporation
Jeremy Gauntlett	Stellenbosch University	New	1974	Rhodesia	British–South African lawyer and judge; sessional judge in the Lesotho Court of Appeal
Elliot Gerson	Harvard University	Magdalen	1974	United States	American secretary of the Rhodes Trust, vice president of the Aspen Institute, Deputy Attorney General of Connecticut
Brian Griffin	Harvard University	Queen's	1974	United States	Oklahoma Secretary of the Environment (1997–2003)
Alan Hobkirk		Jesus	1974	Canada	Field hockey player
Walter Isaacson	Harvard University	Pembroke	1974	United States	Author, managing editor of Time magazine (1995–2001), chairman and CEO of CNN (2001–), president of the Aspen Institute (2003–), vice chairman of the Louisiana Recovery Authority (2005–)
Nicholas Jose	Australian National University	Magdalen	1974	Australia	Novelist
Alex Kerr	Yale University	Balliol	1974	United States	Writer and Japanologist
Brian McHale	Brown University	Merton	1974	United States	Literary scholar
Harold McKnight	University of North Carolina at Chapel Hill	Magdalen	1974	United States	Judge of the United States District Court for the Western District of North Carolina (2003–2004)
Tom McMillen	University of Maryland, College Park	University	1974	United States	U.S. Olympian, NBA basketball player, U.S. Congressman (Maryland), 1987–1993
Roy Pea	Michigan State University	Corpus Christi	1974	United States	Learning sciences expert
Athar Tahir		Oriel	1974	Pakistan	Poet, novelist, non-fiction writer, and artist
Mark Abley	University of Saskatchewan	St John's	1975	Canada	Writer
Kwamena Ahwoi	University of Ghana	Hertford	1975	Ghana	Ghanaian foreign minister (1997)
John Bell	University of Alberta	Magdalen	1975	Canada	Immunologist, geneticist
Clayton Christensen	Brigham Young University	Queen's	1975	United States	Harvard Business School professor, author
Jim Cooper	University of North Carolina, Chapel Hill	Oriel	1975	United States	U.S. Congressman from Tennessee's 5th Congressional District
Richard Fallon	Yale College	Wadham	1975	United States	Story Professor of Law at Harvard Law School
Russ Feingold	University of Wisconsin, Madison	Magdalen	1975	United States	U.S. Senator (D-Wis.) 1993–2011
Mike Fitzpatrick	University of Western Australia	St John's	1975	Australia	Australian businessman, sporting administrator and former Australian rules footballer
David Goldbloom	Harvard University	Exeter	1975	Canada	Psychiatry professor
Pat Haden	University of Southern California	University	1975	United States	Won Rose Bowl MVP as quarterback at USC, played with the Los Angeles Rams, served as the athletic director at his alma mater, USC, from August 2010 to June 2016.
Griff Harsh	Harvard University	New	1975	United States	Neurosurgeon
Peter King	University of Sydney	Worcester	1975	Australia	Australian barrister, author, and federal politician
Scott Matheson	Stanford University	Magdalen	1975	United States	Judge of the United States Court of Appeals for the Tenth Circuit (2010–present), 2004 nominee for Governor of Utah
Chris Maxwell	University of Melbourne	New	1975	Australia	President of the Victorian Court of Appeal
Mike McCaffery	Princeton University	Merton	1975	United States	Businessperson
James Merrell	Lawrence University	New	1975	United States	Early American history professor
Oserheimen Osunbor	University of Nigeria; Nigerian Law School		1975	Nigeria	Senator from Edo Central (1999–2007) and Governor of Edo State (2007–2008)
Michael Poliakoff	Yale University	Corpus Christi	1975	United States	President of the American Council of Trustees and Alumni
Mel Reynolds	University of Illinois, Urbana-Champaign	Lincoln	1975	United States	U.S. Congressman (Illinois), 1993–1995; convicted felon
Carlisle Runge	University of North Carolina at Chapel Hill	New	1975	United States	Economist
Larry Sabato	University of Virginia	Queen's	1975	United States	American political scientist and director of the University of Virginia Center for Politics
Michael Sandel	Brandeis University	Balliol	1975	United States	American political philosopher and professor at Harvard University
Jim Basker	Harvard University; University of Cambridge	Christ Church	1976	United States	Literary history professor
Philip Bryden	Dalhousie University	Balliol	1976	Canada	Lawyer and deputy minister
Hans-Paul Bürkner	University of Bochum; Yale University	St Catherine's	1976	Germany	Former president and CEO of The Boston Consulting Group (2004–2012), chairman at BCG (2012–)
Edwin Cameron	Stellenbosch University	Keble	1976	South Africa	Justice of the Constitutional Court of South Africa, anti-apartheid lawyer and human rights, LGBTIQ and AIDS activist
Ash Carter	Yale University	St John's	1976	United States	Former Harvard professor and United States Deputy Secretary of Defense (October 2011 – December 2013), former United States Secretary of Defense
Bill Cronon	University of Wisconsin, Madison	Jesus	1976	United States	Environmental historian
Ches Crosbie		Balliol	1976	Canada	Newfoundland and Labrador Leader of the Opposition (2018–2021)
Eckart Förster		Balliol	1976	Germany	Philosopher
Robert Harrison	Cornell University	St John's	1976	United States	Banker
John Hood	University of Auckland	Worcester	1976	New Zealand	New Zealand businessman, vice-chancellor of the University of Oxford 2004–2009
Michael L'Estrange	University of Sydney	Worcester	1976	Australia	Australian diplomat and senior public servant
Jeff McMahan	Sewanee: The University of the South	Corpus Christi	1976	United States	Sekyra and White's Professorship of Moral Philosophy (2014–present)
Andrew Michelmore		New	1976	Australia	Lightweight rower
Keith Mostov	University of Chicago	New	1976	United States	Cell biologist
Teck Chin Ong	National University of Singapore	Wadham	1976	Singapore	Educator and independent school principal
Douglas Stone	Harvard University	Balliol	1976	United States	Applied physics professor
Salim Yusuf	St. John's Medical College	St John's	1976	India	Cardiologist
Caroline Alexander	Florida State University	Somerville	1977	United States	British author and documentary producer and writer
Daniel Fournier	Princeton University	Merton	1977	Canada	Chair and CEO of Ivanhoé Cambridge
Laura Garwin	Harvard University	St Hugh's	1977	United States	Physical science editor and North America editor for Nature, trumpeter
Eileen Gillese	University of Alberta	Wadham	1977	Canada	Justice of the Court of Appeal for Ontario (2002–present)
Gerrit Gong	Brigham Young University	Wadham	1977	United States	Special assistant in the State Department, Asia Director at the Center for Strategic and International Studies, Apostle of the Church of Jesus Christ of Latter-day Saints
David Hatendi	University of Zimbabwe	University	1977	Rhodesia	Zimbabwean businessman, former CEO of MBCA and NMB
Clay Jenkinson	Vanderbilt University; University of Minnesota	Hertford	1977	United States	Humanities scholar
Randall Kennedy	Princeton University	Balliol	1977	United States	Harvard Law School professor
Daryl Koehn		Brasenose	1977	United States	Philosopher
Shalini Randeria	Delhi University	St Anne's	1977	India	Anthropologist
Jonathan Ross	Victoria University of Wellington	Magdalen	1977	New Zealand	Cricketer
Richard Stengel	Princeton University	Christ Church	1977	United States	Under Secretary of State for Public Diplomacy and Public Affairs (2014–2016) and Chair and CEO of the National Constitution Center (2004–2006)
Beth Woods	University of Queensland	Wadham	1977	Australia	Director-general of the queensland Department of Agriculture, Fisheries and Forestry
Mark Agrast	Case Western Reserve University	New	1978	United States	Deputy Assistant Attorney General and executive director of the American Society of International Law
Nadine Baudot-Trajtenberg	Université de Montréal	Brasenose	1978	Canada	Israeli economist; deputy governor of the Bank of Israel
Jamie Belich	Victoria University of Wellington	Nuffield	1978	New Zealand	New Zealand historian
Jane Harding	Reed College	Brasenose	1978	New Zealand	Neonatologist; president of the Royal Society Te Apārangi (2024–present)
Jacques Hurtubise	University of Montreal	Trinity	1978	Canada	Mathematics professor, helped prove the Atiyah-Jones conjecture
Rachel Klevit	Reed College	St Catherine's	1978	United States	Biochemist
Eric Lander	Princeton University	St John's	1978	United States	Chair of U.S. president Barack Obama's Council of Advisors on Science and Technology, founder of the Human Genome Project, biology professor at MIT
Jacko Maree	University of Stellenbosch	Pembroke	1978	South Africa	CEO of Standard Bank
Anita Mehta	Presidency University, Kolkata	St Catherine's	1978	India	Physicist
Loyiso Nongxa	University of Fort Hare	Balliol	1978	South Africa	Vice Chancellor of the University of the Witwatersrand (2003–2013)
Evelyn O'Callaghan	University College Cork	Wolfson	1978	Jamaica	Jamaican academic, professor of West Indian literature at University of the West Indies
Ann Olivarius	Yale University	Somerville	1978	United States	American-British lawyer who specializes in cases of civil litigation, sexual harassment, and sexual discrimination
Baņuta Rubess	Queen's University at Kingston	St Antony's	1978	Canada	Canadian playwright, theatre director, and professor at the University of Toronto
Virginia Seitz	Duke University	Brasenose	1978	United States	United States Assistant Attorney General for Legal Counsel (2011–2013)
Lucy Sichone	University of Zambia	Somerville	1978	Zambia	Zambian civil rights activist and first woman to have her portrait displayed on the walls of the Rhodes House
Malcolm Turnbull	University of Sydney	Brasenose	1978	Australia	29th prime minister of Australia, 2015–2018
Doron Weber	Brown University; Sorbonne	Exeter	1978	United States	Author
Wendy Carlin	Murdoch University	Wadham	1979	Australia	Budget expert
Hugh Corder	University of Cape Town	Keble	1979	South Africa	Legal scholar
Nancy-Ann DeParle	University of Tennessee	Balliol	1979	United States	Administrator of the U.S. Health Care Financing Administration, 1997–2000, director of White House Office of Health Reform, 2009–
James Der Derian	McGill University	Balliol	1979	United States	International security professor
Glenn Fine	Harvard College	Pembroke	1979	United States	Inspector General of the Department of Justice (2000–2011)
Sandra Fredman	University of the Witwatersrand	Wadham	1979	South Africa	Law professor
Paul Gootenberg	Boston University; University of Chicago	St Antony's	1979	United States	Latin American historian
Steve Gumley	University of Tasmania	St Catherine's	1979	Australia	CEO of the Australian Defence Materiel Organisation (2004–2011)
David Hamill	University of Queensland	Queen's	1979	Australia	Queensland MLA for Ipswich (1983–2001); Treasurer of Queensland (1998–2001)
James Hildreth	Harvard University	Corpus Christi	1979	United States	Immunology professor and HIV researcher
Michael Hoffman	Boise State University	Oriel	1979	United States	American film director, writer, and producer.
Michael Hopkins		New	1979	United States	Algebraic topology expert
Ruth Karras	Yale University	New	1979	United States	Historian of the Middle Ages; Lecky Professor of History (2018–present); President of the Medieval Academy of America (2019–2020)
David Lodge	University of the South	Christ Church	1979	United States	Biologiest
Robert Maloney	Harvard University	Magdalen	1979	United States	Ophthalmologist, LASIK specialist, Extreme Makeover ophthalmologist
John McCaskill	University of Sydney	New	1979	Australia	Theoretical biochemistry professor
David Naylor	University of Toronto	Hertford	1979	Canada	Canadian medical researcher, president of the University of Toronto
Robin Russin	Harvard University	Corpus Christi	1979	United States	Playwright
John Santos	University of Notre Dame	St Catherine's	1979	United States	Documentary filmmaker, journalist, and author
Stefan Underhill	University of Virginia	Merton	1979	United States	Judge of the United States District Court for the District of Connecticut (1999–2022)
Stephen Burley	University of Western Ontario	Exeter	1980	Canada	Oncologist and structural biologist
Amrita Cheema	St. Stephen's College, Delhi	Exeter	1980	India	News presenter for Deutsche Welle and SBS Television
Gordon Crovitz	University of Chicago	Wadham	1980	United States	Publisher of The Wall Street Journal
Phil Crowe	University of Sydney	University	1980	Australia	Cricketer, rugger and surgical oncologist
Peter Donnelly	University of Queensland	Balliol	1980	Australia	Professor of Statistical Science at the University of Oxford
Billy Downer	Stellenbosch University	Brasenose	1980	South Africa	Prosecutor
Don Elder	University of Canterbury	Wolfson	1980	New Zealand	New Zealand engineer and businessman
Clark Ervin	Harvard University	St Catherine's	1980	United States	Former Inspector General of the U.S. Department of Homeland Security
Matthew Jocelyn	Mount Allison University; Aix-Marseille University; McGill University	Lady Margaret	1980	Canada	Director of Canadian Stage
John MacBain	McGill University	Wadham	1980	Canada	Canadian multi-billionaire, president and CEO of Trader Classified Media, one of the world's largest classified advertising companies
Barry Nalebuff	Massachusetts Institute of Technology	Nuffield	1980	United States	Business theory professor
Max Price	University of the Witwatersrand	Magdalen	1980	South Africa	Vice Chancellor and Principal of the University of Cape Town (2008–2018)
Sivarasa Rasiah	University of Malaya	St Anne's	1980	Malaysia	Malaysian politician, Member of Parliament, Former Deputy Minister
Adam Rome	Yale University	St John's	1980	United States	Environmental historian
Tim Sellers	Harvard University	University	1980	United States	American philosopher
Ricky Skerritt	University of the Virgin Islands	Keble	1980	British Caribbean	Saint Kitts and Nevis tourism minister (2010–2015) and President of Cricket West Indies (2019–present)
Elsdon Storey	University of Melbourne	Magdalen	1980	Australia	Australian neurologist
Marc Tessier-Lavigne	McGill University	New	1980	Canada	Canadian neuroscientist, 11th president of Stanford University, past President of Rockefeller University
Andrew Wilkinson	University of Alberta	Magdalen	1980	Canada	Canadian politician, former Minister in British Columbia, Leader of the Liberal Party in British Columbia
Tony Abbott	University of Sydney	Queen's	1981	Australia	28th Prime Minister of Australia, 18 September 2013 – 14 September 2015
Michael Albert	University of Waterloo	Magdalen	1981	Canada	Computer science professor
Joel Bakan	Simon Fraser University	Balliol	1981	Canada	Law professor
Daniel Dreisbach	University of South Carolina	Lady Margaret	1981	United States	Lawyer and academic; specialist on the separation of church and state
Dan Esty	Harvard University	Balliol	1981	United States	Commissioner of the Connecticut Department of Energy and Environmental Protection (2011–2014)
Christine French	University of Otago	Worcester	1981	New Zealand	Judge of the Court of Appeal of New Zealand (2012–present)
Bernard Hibbitts	Dalhousie University; University of King's College; Carleton University	University	1981	Canada	Law professor
Michelle Johnson	United States Air Force Academy	Brasenose	1981	United States	U.S. Air Force lieutenant general and Superintendent of the United States Air Force Academy (2013–2017)
Nicholas Kristof	Harvard University	Magdalen	1981	United States	New York Times reporter and columnist, two-time Pulitzer Prize winner, Aspen Strategy Group member
Don Markwell	University of Queensland	Trinity	1981	Australia	Educational reformer and first Rhodes Scholar to serve as Warden of Rhodes House, Oxford
Liz Sherwood-Randall	Harvard University	Balliol	1981	United States	United States Homeland Security Advisor (2021–2025), United States Deputy Secretary of Energy (2014–2017)
Simon Upton	University of Auckland	Wolfson	1981	New Zealand	New Zealand politician and member of Parliament
Stephen Vasciannie	University of the West Indies	Balliol	1981	Jamaica	Ambassador to the United States (2012–2015) and principal of the Norman Manley Law School
Yolande Chan	Massachusetts Institute of Technology	Hertford	1982	Jamaica	Dean and James McGill Professor at the Desautels Faculty of Management, McGill University
Susanna Elm	Free University of Berlin	St Hilda's	1982	Germany	Classicist
Barton Gellman	Princeton University	University	1982	United States	Pulitzer Prize-winning U.S. journalist (Washington Post and Time magazine), author
Larry Grafstein	Harvard University	Balliol	1982	Canada	Investment banker
Ben Kingsbury	University of Canterbury	Balliol	1982	New Zealand	New Zealand legal scholar, author and researcher, professor at New York University
Bruce Reed	Princeton University	Lincoln	1982	United States	Former Chief of Staff to Vice President Joe Biden
Belinda van Heerden	Stellenbosch University	Brasenose	1982	South Africa	Judge of the Supreme Court of Appeal (2004–2013)
Ricky Waddell	United States Military Academy	Corpus Christi	1982	United States	United States Principal Deputy National Security Advisor (2017–2018)
Heather Wilson	United States Air Force Academy	Jesus	1982	United States	President of South Dakota School of Mines and Technology; former Republican member of the US House of Representatives, representing New Mexico's 1st congressional district 1998–2009; first female military veteran elected to a full term in Congress
Sam Zurier	Yale University	Balliol	1982	United States	Rhode Island State Senator (2021–present)
Tajudeen Abdul-Raheem	Bayero University Kano	St Peter's	1983	Nigeria	Pan-Africanist; general secretary of the 1994 Pan-African Congress
Brenda Buttner	Harvard University	Balliol	1983	United States	Business journalist
David Celermajer	University of Sydney	New	1983	Australia	Cardiology professor
Charles Conn	Boston University	Balliol	1983	United States	Warden of Rhodes House, Oxford, 2013–2018
Christopher L. Eisgruber	Princeton University	University	1983	United States	President of Princeton University
Timothy Endicott	Harvard University	Corpus Christi	1983	Canada	Vinerian Professor of English Law (2020–present) and dean of the Oxford University Faculty of Law (2007–2015)
David Frederick	University of Pittsburgh	University	1983	United States	Appellate attorney who has parties dozens of cases before the United States Supreme Court
Rod Gover	University of Canterbury	University	1983	New Zealand	Mathematician
Bill Halter	Stanford University	St John's	1983	United States	Lieutenant Governor of Arkansas 2007–2011
Robert Hockett	University of Kansas	Lincoln	1983	United States	Lawyer, law professor, and eminent domain advocate
Elizabeth Kiss	Davidson College	Balliol	1983	United States	Former president of Agnes Scott College, Atlanta, Georgia; Warden of Rhodes House, Oxford, 2018–
Keith Krause	University of Alberta	Balliol	1983	Canada	Political scientist; founder of the Small Arms Survey
Marvin Krislov	Yale University	Magdalen	1983	United States	President of Pace University (2017–present)
John Lazar	University of the Witwatersrand	Balliol	1983	South Africa	CEO of Metaswitch
Mark Martins	United States Military Academy	Balliol	1983	United States	Brigadier General (United States Army), Chief Prosecutor of Military Commissions
Lois Quam	Macalester College	Trinity	1983	United States	Business executive who has worked in the public and the private sectors to expand access to health care
David Vitter	Harvard University	Magdalen	1983	United States	U.S. Senator (R-La.), 2005–2017
John Wylie	University of Queensland	Balliol	1983	Australia	Australian investment banker and trustee of the Rhodes Trust, 2010–2018
Dominic Barton	University of British Columbia	Brasenose	1984	Canada	Former president/head and managing director of McKinsey & Company, a multi-billion revenue consulting firm. Chancellor, University of Waterloo, Canada
Donald Bobiash		Balliol	1984	Canada	Ambassador
Richard Flanagan	University of Tasmania	Worcester	1984	Australia	Australian author, winner of the 2002 Commonwealth Writers Prize. Winner of the 2014 Man Booker Prize
Brian Greene	Harvard University	Magdalen	1984	United States	String theorist
Michael Hasselmo	Harvard University	Corpus Christi	1984	United States	Neuroscientist
Chris Hedrick	Stanford University	Magdalen	1984	United States	Peace Corps/Senegal country director, former president and CEO of Intrepid Learning Solutions
Elizabeth Hollingworth	University of Western Australia	St Edmund	1984	Australia	Australian judge, Trials Division Justice at the Supreme Court of Victoria, 2004–
William Lahey	Mount Allison University	Exeter	1984	Canada	Lawyer; president and vice-chancellor of the University of King's College
Raymond Lim	University of Adelaide	Balliol	1984	Singapore	Minister for Transport (2006–2011)
Robert Malley	Yale University	Magdalen	1984	United States	Director for Near East and South Asian Affairs, National Security Council, 1997–2001
Cheryl Misak	University of Lethbridge; University of Lethbridge	Balliol	1984	Canada	Philosopher; president of the Charles S. Peirce Society
Hunter Monroe	Davidson College	Balliol	1984	United States	Senior economist at the International Monetary Fund, Peterson Institute for International Economics, and United States Congress Joint Economic Committee
Trevor Mundel	University of the Witwatersrand	Balliol	1984	South Africa	Medical scientist; president of the Bill & Melinda Gates Foundation Global Health Program
Christopher Murray	Harvard University	Merton	1984	United States	Director of the Institute for Health Metrics and Evaluation
Nicoli Nattrass	Stellenbosch University; University of Natal	Magdalen	1984	South Africa	Economics professor
Daniel Porterfield	Georgetown University	Hertford	1984	United States	Former aide to U.S. Health and Human Services Secretary Donna Shalala; president of Franklin and Marshall College
Hugh Possingham	University of Adelaide	St John's	1984	Australia	Chief Scientist of the Nature Conservancy
Catherine Sandoval	Yale University	St Antony's	1984	United States	Commissioner of the California Public Utilities Commission
Craig Scott	McGill University	St John's	1984	Canada	Member of Parliament (2012–2015)
Sarah Sewall	Harvard University	New	1984	United States	Under Secretary of State for Civilian Security, Democracy, and Human Rights (2014–2017)
Javed Siddiqi	University of Western Ontario	Christ Church	1984	Canada	Neurosurgeon
Graham Steele	University of Manitoba	St Edmund	1984	Canada	Minister of Finance of Nova Scotia (July 2009–), member of the Nova Scotia House of Assembly (2001–2013)
George Stephanopoulos	Columbia University	Balliol	1984	United States	Moderator of ABC's This Week and communications director for Bill Clinton's 1992 presidential campaign
Elleke Boehmer		St John's	1985	South Africa	British postcolonial studies scholar
Khai Meng Choy	University of Cambridge	Green	1985	Singapore	Medicine
David Forsyth	University of Witwatersrand	Balliol	1985	South Africa	Fulton Watson Copp Chair in Computer Science at the University of Illinois at Urbana–Champaign
Lisa Hill	University of Tasmania	University	1985	Australia	Political scientist
Ian Jackman	University of Sydney	University	1985	Australia	Judge of the Federal Court of Australia (2023–present)
Michael Kilborn	University of Sydney	St John's	1985	Australia	Cricketer, electrophysiologist and cardiologist
David Kirk	University of Otago	Worcester	1985	New Zealand	Captain of the New Zealand All Blacks who won the inaugural Rugby (Union) World Cup in 1987; CEO of Fairfax Media, 2005–2008
Bronek Masojada	University of KwaZulu-Natal	Trinity	1985	South Africa	Chief executive of Hiscox; Sheriff of the City of London (2023–2024)
Stuart Munsch	United States Naval Academy	Hertford	1985	United States	Commander of Allied Joint Force Command Naples and United States Naval Forces Europe and Africa (2022–present)
Peter Rathjen	University of Adelaide	New	1985	Australia	Australian stem cell scientist, vice-chancellor, University of Tasmania 2011–2017, University of Adelaide 2018–2020
Jonathan Shapiro	Harvard University	Oriel	1985	United States	Television producer, writer, and Assistant United States Attorney
Naomi Wolf	Yale University	New	1985	United States	American feminist social critic, author of books including The End of America (2007)
Dale Abel	University of the West Indies	Green	1986	Jamaica	American endocrinologist
Gregory Abowd	University of Notre Dame	Trinity	1986	United States	Computer scientist
Alec Cameron	University of Sydney	University	1986	Australia	Vice Chancellor of Aston University (2016–present)
Show-Mao Chen	Harvard University	Corpus Christi	1986	Singapore	Singaporean opposition politician and lawyer
Barry Edelstein	Tufts University	Pembroke	1986	United States	Artistic director of the Old Globe Theatre (2012–present)
Christopher Honey	University of Toronto	Trinity	1986	Canada	Barbadian Olympic diver
Bryan Horrigan	University of Queensland	University	1986	Australia	Dean of the Monash University Faculty of Law; legal scholar and consultant
Eric Hoskins	McMaster University	Balliol	1986	Canada	Ontario Minister of Health (2014–2018)
Maurice Jones	Hampden-Sydney College	St John's	1986	United States	United States Deputy Secretary of Housing and Urban Development (2012–2014)
Vivian Lee	Harvard University	Balliol	1986	United States	Radiologist
Tess Lewis	University of Notre Dame	New	1986	United States	Translator and Essayist
Michael McFaul	Stanford University	St John's	1986	United States	U.S. Ambassador to Russia, academic
Elliott Portnoy	Syracuse University	New	1986	United States	Global CEO of Dentons
Daniel Promislow		Merton	1986	Canada	Biogerontologist; co-director of the Dog Aging Project
Mahesh Rangarajan	Hindu College, Delhi	Balliol	1986	India	Environmental historian
Susan Rice	Stanford University	New	1986	United States	U.S. assistant secretary of state for African affairs (1997–2001), United States Ambassador to the United Nations, (2009–2013), National Security Advisor (2013–2017)
Ben Sherwood	Harvard University	Magdalen	1986	United States	President of Disney-ABC Television Group and ABC News
Bonnie St. John	Harvard University	Trinity	1986	United States	Paralympic skier
Kimberly Strong	Memorial University of Newfoundland	St John's	1986	Canada	Atmospheric physicist
Joe Torsella	University of Pennsylvania	New	1986	United States	President and CEO of the National Constitution Center 2006–
Wilhelm Verwoerd	Stellenbosch University	Corpus Christi	1986	South Africa	Anti-apartheid advocate
Oskar von Preussen		Keble	1986	Germany	Aristocrat and media executive
Michael Barr	Yale University	Magdalen	1987	United States	Acting Under Secretary of the Treasury for Domestic Finance (2009–2010), Assistant Secretary of the Treasury for Financial Institutions (2009–2011)
Stefan Berger	University of Cologne	Trinity	1987	Germany	Historian
Malcolm Brown		Worcester	1987	South Africa	First-class cricketer and Barings Bank executive
Shona Brown	Carleton University	Worcester	1987	South Africa	Canadian business executive; senior vice-president of business operations at Google
David Chalmers	University of Adelaide	Lincoln	1987	Australia	Australian philosopher of mind, New York University professor of philosophy and neural science
Sarah Cleveland	Brown University	Lincoln	1987	United States	Law professor, Columbia University
James Collins	College of the Holy Cross	Balliol	1987	United States	Founder of synthetic biology; MacArthur "genius" bioengineer and inventor; MIT professor
Elizabeth Cousens	University of Puget Sound	New	1987	United States	President and CEO of the United Nations Foundation
Merlin Crossley	University of Melbourne	Magdalen	1987	Australia	Molecular biology professor, deputy vice chancellor (academic), University of New South Wales (2016–present)
Bob Dow	Yale University	Brasenose	1987	United States	Judge of the United States District Court for the Northern District of Illinois (2007–present)
Atul Gawande	Stanford University	Balliol	1987	United States	Surgeon and New Yorker medical writer
Sagarika Ghose	St. Stephen's College, Delhi	St Antony's	1987	India	Indian journalist
Prabhat Jha	University of Manitoba	Magdalen	1987	Canada	Epidemiologist
Asher Lopatin	Boston University	Hertford	1987	United States	Jewish advocate
Sylvia Mathews Burwell	Harvard University	Worcester	1987	United States	United States Secretary of Health and Human Services (2014–2017), director of the Office of Management and Budget (2013–2014)
Kumi Naidoo		Magdalen	1987	South Africa	Human rights activist; secretary-general of Amnesty International (2018–2020)
Simon Palfrey		Jesus	1987	Australia	Shakespearean and Renaissance literature professor, Oxford University
Vikram Patel	University of Mumbai	Worcester	1987	India	Psychiatrist and mental health scientist
Patrick Pichette	University of Quebec, Montreal	Pembroke	1987	Canada	Senior vice president and chief financial officer of Google until 2015
David Polkinghorne		Pembroke	1987	South Africa	Cricketer
Laura Ruetsche	Carleton College	New	1987	United States	Philosopher
Brett Scharffs	Georgetown University	University	1987	United States	Law professor
John Tien	United States Military Academy	Queen's	1987	United States	United States Deputy Secretary of Homeland Security (2021–2023)
Ute Wartenberg		Corpus Christi	1987	Germany	Numismatistic research curator and the first woman president of the American Numismatic Society
Andrew Wee	University of Cambridge	Keble	1987	Singapore	Physics professor
Jacob Weisberg	Yale University	New	1987	United States	Journalist and editor of Slate magazine
Jennifer Welsh	University of Saskatchewan	St Anne's	1987	Canada	International relations researcher
Ngaire Woods	University of Auckland	Balliol	1987	New Zealand	New Zealand-born British academic, Dean, Blavatnik School of Government, Professor of Global Economic Governance University of Oxford
Kathryn Brown	University of Adelaide	Balliol	1988	Australia	Art history professor, Loughborough University
Knute Buehler	Oregon State University	Merton	1988	United States	2018 nominee for Governor of Oregon, member of the Oregon House of Representatives (2015–2019)
Sanjay Chauhan	Delhi University	Worcester	1988	India	Cricketer
John Devereux	University of Queensland	Magdalen	1988	Australia	Torts and medical law professor, University of Queensland
Richard Drayton	Harvard University	Balliol	1988	Barbados	Historian, Rhodes Professor of Imperial History
Ceri Evans	University of Otago	Worcester	1988	New Zealand	New Zealand footballer, forensic psychiatrist
Bryan Hassel	University of North Carolina, Chapel Hill	Balliol	1988	United States	Education policy expert
Jim Himes	Harvard University	St Edmund	1988	United States	American businessman, Democratic U.S. Representative for Connecticut's 4th Congressional District
Caroline Hoxby	Harvard University	Magdalen	1988	United States	Economics professor, Stanford University
Jeni Klugman		New	1988	Australia	Development economist
Russell Muirhead	Harvard University	Balliol	1988	United States	Robert Clements Professor of Democracy and Politics at Dartmouth College; Member of the New Hampshire House of Representatives (2020–present)
John Nagl	United States Military Academy	St John's	1988	United States	President of the Center for a New American Security
Ann Nicholson	University of Melbourne	St John's	1988	Australia	Computer science professor, Monash University
Michael Thaddeus	Harvard University	St John's	1988	United States	Mathematician and whistleblower
Jonathan Wilkinson	University of Saskatchewan	Exeter	1988	Canada	Minister of Environment and Climate Change (2019–2021), Minister of Fisheries, Oceans and the Canadian Coast Guard (2018–2019)
Gerry Cardinale		Christ Church	1989	United States	Private equity investor; founder of RedBird Capital Partners
Paul Carrese	Middlebury College	Pembroke	1989	United States	Political science professor
Brad Carson	Baylor University	Trinity	1989	United States	U.S. Congressman (Oklahoma), 2001–2005
Ike Chioke	Obafemi Awolowo University	Wadham	1989	Nigeria	Group managing director of Afrinvest
Anna Donald	University of Sydney	New	1989	Australia	Evidence-based medicine expert and epidemiologist
Katherine Eban	Brown University	St John's	1989	United States	Journalist and author
Christopher Ford	Harvard University	Christ Church	1989	United States	Acting Under Secretary of State for Arms Control and International Security Affairs (2019–2021, 2018), Assistant Secretary of State for International Security and Nonproliferation (2018–2021)
Sarah Harding	McGill University	Lincoln	1989	Canada	Legal scholar; Dean of the Schulich School of Law
Brad Hoylman-Sigal	West Virginia University	Exeter	1989	United States	New York State Senator, 2013–present
Tom Malinowski	University of California, Berkeley	St Antony's	1989	United States	U.S. representative (2019–2023), Assistant Secretary of State for Democracy, Human Rights, and Labor (2014–2017)
James Manyika	University of Zimbabwe	Keble	1989	Zimbabwe	Academic, consultant, and business executive; chairman of the McKinsey Global Institute and
Michael McCullough	Stanford University	Balliol	1989	United States	Social entrepreneur; founder of QuestBridge, medical investor and entrepreneur, physician, assistant professor at UCSF
Maureen McLane	Harvard University	Hertford	1989	United States	Poetry critic
Sarah Nuttall	University of Natal; University of Cape Town	Trinity	1989	South Africa	Cultural studies academic
Jay Rubenstein	Carleton College	St John's	1989	United States	Middle Ages historian
John Tasioulas	University of Melbourne	Balliol	1989	Australia	AI ethics and legal philosophy professor, University of Oxford
Andrew Bell	University of Sydney	Magdalen	1990	Australia	Chief Justice of New South Wales (2022–present) and Lieutenant-Governor of New South Wales (2022–present)
Elias Chipimo		Oriel	1990	Zambia	President of the National Restoration Party; presidential candidate
Danielle Clode	University of Adelaide	Balliol	1990	Australia	Award-winning Australian Author
Jen Easterly	United States Military Academy	Pembroke	1990	United States	Director of the Cybersecurity and Infrastructure Security Agency (2021–2025)
Carol Harrison	Louisiana State University	Balliol	1990	United States	Historian of France
Jennifer Howard-Grenville	Queen’s University	New	1990	Canada	Diageo Professor of Organisation Studies at the Cambridge Judge Business School
Joel Shin	Harvard University	St John's	1990	United States	Political advisor
Michael Szonyi	University of Toronto	Merton	1990	Canada	Professor of Chinese history at Harvard University
Martina Vandenberg	Pomona College	St Antony's	1990	United States	Anti-human trafficking lawyer
Tara Welch	University of Southern California	Corpus Christi	1990	United States	University of Kansas classics professor
Sabina Alkire	University of Illinois Urbana-Champaign	Magdalen	1991	United States	Director of the Oxford Poverty and Human Development Initiative
Rufus Black	University of Melbourne	Keble	1991	Australia	Vice Chancellor of the University of Tasmania (2018–present)
David Coleman	Yale University	University	1991	United States	Ninth president of the College Board
Jeff Dolven	Yale University	Worcester	1991	United States	English literature professor
Justin Fox	University of Cape Town	Brasenose	1991	South Africa	Photojournalist and magazine editor
Chrystia Freeland	Harvard University	St Antony's	1991	Canada	Canadian author, editor of Thomson Reuters Digital, warden and chief executive officer of Rhodes Trust, former deputy prime minister of Canada and minister of finance
Peter Henry	University of North Carolina, Chapel Hill	St Catherine's	1991	United States	Dean of the New York University Stern School of Business (2010–2017)
Christopher Howard	United States Air Force Academy	St Anne's	1991	United States	President of Robert Morris University (2016–2022)
Janice Hudgings	Swarthmore College	New	1991	United States	Physicist
Edward Iacobucci	Queen's University, Kingston	St John's	1991	Canada	Dean of the University of Toronto Faculty of Law (2005–2010)
Goodwin Liu	Stanford University	Lady Margaret	1991	United States	Associate Justice of the California Supreme Court (2011–present)
Carl Marci	Columbia University	St Catherine's	1991	United States	Psychiatrist
Heather Morrison	University of Prince Edward Island	St Catherine's	1991	Canada	Chief Public Health Officer of Prince Edward Island
Arthur Mutambara	University of Zimbabwe	Merton	1991	Zimbabwe	Zimbabwean politician who became president of one faction of the Movement for Democratic Change in 2006
Greg Pak	New York University	Hertford	1991	United States	Comic book writer
Jeff Shesol	Brown University	Magdalen	1991	United States	Author, speechwriter, political cartoonist
Len Stark	University of Delaware	Magdalen	1991	United States	Chief Judge (2014–2021) and Judge (2010–2022) of the United States District Court for the District of Delaware
Stefan Talmon	University of Tübingen; LMU Munich	St Antony's	1991	Germany	International lawyer
Angus Taylor	University of Sydney	New	1991	Australia	Minister for Energy and Emissions Reduction (2018–2022), Minister for Law Enforcement and Cybersecurity (2017–2018)
Simukai Utete		Balliol	1991	Zimbabwe	Robotics scientist
Kenji Yoshino	Harvard University	Magdalen	1991	United States	Constitutional law scholar
Arash Abizadeh	University of Winnipeg	Queen's	1992	Canada	Philosophy professor
Jenni Adams	University of Canterbury	Magdalen	1992	New Zealand	Astrophysicist; lead New Zealand scientist at the IceCube Neutrino Observatory
Catherine Beaudry		Trinity	1992	Canada	Social scientist
Cory Booker	Stanford University	Queen's	1992	United States	US senator for New Jersey (2013–present)
Sujit Choudhry	McGill University	University	1992	Canada	Comparative constitutional law academic; dean of the UC Berkeley School of Law (2014–2016)
John Danesh	University of Otago	Balliol	1992	New Zealand	Epidemiologist
Benjamin Ebert	Williams College	Balliol	1992	United States	Oncologist
Jonah Edelman	Yale University	Balliol	1992	United States	Public education advocate
Jodi Evans	University of Calgary	Magdalen	1992	Canada	Olympic basketball player
Henry Fadamiro	Federal University of Technology Akure	Green	1992	Nigeria	Entomologist
Noah Feldman	Harvard University	Christ Church	1992	United States	American author, Harvard law professor, constitutional adviser to the Coalition Provisional Authority in Iraq, 2003–2005
Nikolas Gvosdev	Georgetown University	St Antony's	1992	United States	Russian-American contributing editor for The National Interest, teacher at Naval War College
Peter Hessler	Princeton University	Mansfield	1992	United States	Writer and journalist
Marnie Hughes-Warrington	University of Tasmania	Merton	1992	Australia	History professor
Bobby Jindal	Brown University	New	1992	United States	Governor of Louisiana (2008–2016); U.S. congressman, civil servant, and university administrator; former Republican presidential candidate (2015)
Marc Lipsitch	Yale University	Merton	1992	United States	Epidemiologist
Nader Mousavizadeh	Harvard College	Christ Church	1992	Denmark	United Nations official and writer
Neel Mukherjee	Jadavpur University	University	1992	India	Novelist, shortlisted for the 2014 Man Booker Prize
Lisette Nieves	Brooklyn College	Corpus Christi	1992	United States	Non-profit executive
Rohini Pande	St. Stephen's College, Delhi	Balliol	1992	India	American economist
Richard Primus	Harvard University	Balliol	1992	United States	Constitutional law professor
Tracy Robinson	University of the West Indies	Balliol	1992	Jamaica	Member of the Inter-American Commission on Human Rights (2012–2015)
Sanjeev Sanyal	Delhi University	St John's	1992	India	Asian economist, banker and conservationist from India
Catherine Sharkey	Yale University	Magdalen	1992	United States	Law professor
Bob Sternfels	Stanford University	Worcester	1992	United States	Managing partner of McKinsey & Company (2021–present)
Jack Turner	University of Melbourne	Magdalen	1992	Australia	Historical documentary host
Dmitri Tymoczko	Harvard University	Oriel	1992	United States	Composer and music theorist
Peter Beinart	Yale University	University	1993	United States	Journalist; former editor of The New Republic; contributing editor at The Atlantic; associate professor at CUNY
Carellin Brooks	McGill University	University	1993	Canada	Edmund White Award recipient
Mahmood Farooqui	St. Stephen's College, Delhi	St Peter's	1993	India	Dastangoi storyteller
Taylor Fravel	Middlebury College	New	1993	United States	International security expert
Eric Garcetti	Columbia University	Queen's	1993	United States	Mayor of Los Angeles (2015–2022), United States Ambassador to India (2023–2025)
Cécile Laborde	Institut d'études politiques de Bordeaux	St Antony's	1993	France	Political theory academic
Nnenna Lynch	Villanova University	St John's	1993	United States	Runner
Jennifer Martin	University of Otago	Lady Margaret	1993	New Zealand	Clinical pharmacologist; president of the Royal Australasian College of Physicians (2024–present)
Stephen Morgan	Harvard University	Balliol	1993	United States	Sociology and education professor
Sid Mukherjee	Stanford University	Magdalen	1993	India	Physician, scientist, professor at Columbia Medical School, author of The Emperor of All Maladies: A Biography of Cancer which won the 2011 Pulitzer Prize for General Nonfiction
David Ndii	University of Nairobi	St Antony's	1993	Kenya	Economist
David Panton	Princeton University	Green Templeton	1993	Jamaica	Senator and lawyer
Niles Pierce	Princeton University	Christ Church	1993	United States	Bioengineering professor
Gina Raimondo	Harvard University	New	1993	United States	Governor of Rhode Island (2015–2021), United States Secretary of Commerce (2021–2025)
David Rodin	University of Waikato	Magdalen	1993	New Zealand	Philosopher
Faith Salie	Harvard University	Magdalen	1993	United States	Actress, comedian, host of Public Radio International's Fair Game from PRI with Faith Salie
John Unger	West Virginia University	Hertford	1993	United States	West Virginia State Senator (1998–2021)
Monica Youn	Princeton University; Yale Law School	University	1993	United States	Poet and lawyer
Randy Boissonnault	University of Alberta	Corpus Christi	1994	Canada	Canadian Cabinet Minister, member of the House of Commons of Canada (2015–2019, 2021–present)
Matthew Boyle		Balliol	1994	United States	Philosopher
Attila Brungs	University of New South Wales	New	1994	Australia	Vice chancellor and president of the University of New South Wales (2022–present), vice chancellor and president of the University of Technology Sydney (2014–2022)
Nigel Clarke	University of the West Indies	Linacre	1994	Jamaica	Minister of Finance and the Public Service (2018–present) and MP
Lisa Gorton	University of Melbourne	Merton	1994	Australia	Writer
Merata Kawharu		Exeter	1994	New Zealand	Māori academic
Thierry Morel	University of Paris	Oriel	1994	France	Director and curator-at-large of the Hermitage Museum Foundation
Eduardo Peñalver	Cornell University	Oriel	1994	United States	Dean of Cornell Law School (2014–2021) and President of Seattle University (2021–present)
Randal Pinkett	Rutgers University, New Brunswick	Keble	1994	United States	President and CEO of BCT Partners, winner of The Apprentice 4
Ananya Vajpeyi	Jawaharlal Nehru University	Exeter	1994	India	Academic and writer
Geraldine Wright	University of Wyoming	Hertford	1994	United States	Insect neuroethologist
Andrew Zawacki	College of William and Mary	University	1994	United States	Poet
Karen Bakker	McMaster University	St John's	1995	Canada	Sustainability researcher
Jenny Cooper	University of Otago	Magdalen	1995	New Zealand	Corporate lawyer
Carolyn Evans	University of Melbourne	Exeter	1995	Australia	Vice Chancellor and President of Griffith University (2019–present)
Drew Hansen	Harvard University	Magdalen	1995	United States	Member of the Washington House of Representatives (2011–present)
Benjamin Jones	Princeton University	Magdalen	1995	United States	Economics professor
Desmond Koh	University of Southern California	Oriel	1995	Singapore	Competitive swimmer
Rachel Maddow	Stanford University	Lincoln	1995	United States	Journalist; social activist; host of The Rachel Maddow Show on MSNBC
Jens Meierhenrich		St Antony's	1995	Germany	International relations scholar
Audri Mukhopadhyay	Dalhousie University	Magdalen	1995	Canada	Diplomat; Canadian Consul General in Ho Chi Minh City, Vietnam (2009–2013)
Matthew Polly	Princeton University	Exeter	1995	United States	Author and martial artist
Cristina Rodríguez	Yale University	St John's	1995	United States	Law professor and co-chair of the Presidential Commission on the Supreme Court of the United States (2021)
Peter Rutledge	University of Auckland	Magdalen	1995	New Zealand	Chemist and pharmacologist
Jonny Steinberg	University of the Witwatersrand	Balliol	1995	South Africa	Writer
Roopa Unnikrishnan	Women's Christian College, Chennai; Ethiraj College for Women	Balliol	1995	India	Sports shooter at the Commonwealth Games and Head of Strategy at Harman International
Jamie Wall	University of Wisconsin–Madison	Magdalen	1995	United States	Wisconsin state senator from the 30th district
Lucy Allais	University of the Witwatersrand	Merton	1996	South Africa	Philosopher
Brenton Brown		Brasenose	1996	South Africa	Christian musician
Byron Byrne	University of Western Australia	Balliol	1996	Australia	Cricketer
Vahni Capildeo		Christ Church	1996	Trinidad and Tobago	Poet
Jeremy Dauber	Harvard College	Magdalen	1996	United States	Yiddish and Jewish studies academic; Atran Professor of Yiddish Language, Literature, and Culture at Columbia University
Mark Embree	Virginia Tech	Balliol	1996	United States	Computational and applied mathematics professor
Michelle Gavin	Georgetown University	Lincoln	1996	United States	United States Ambassador to Botswana (2011–2014)
Eric Greitens	Duke University	Lady Margaret	1996	United States	56th governor of Missouri, founder of The Mission Continues and former Navy SEAL
Lisa Grushcow		Balliol	1996	Canada	Rabbi
Ruth Hall	University of Cape Town	St Antony's	1996	South Africa	Political scientist
Rosemary Langford	University of Melbourne; Monash University		1996	Australia	Law professor
Nils Oermann	Leipzig University	Christ Church	1996	Germany	Business ethics professor
Nicholas Pirihi	University of Waikato	Merton	1996	New Zealand	Cricketer
Lavanya Rajamani	National Law School	Hertford	1996	India	International environmental law scholar
Adam Russell	Duke University	Magdalen	1996	United States	Anthropologist; acting deputy director of the Advanced Research Projects Agency for Health
Carolyn Seepersad	West Virginia University	Balliol	1996	United States	Mechanical engineer
Anasuya Sengupta	Lady Shri Ram College, Delhi	St Peter's	1996	India	Poet
Ramin Toloui	Harvard University	Balliol	1996	United States	Assistant Secretary of State for Economic and Business Affairs (2022–present)
Dayne Walling	Michigan State University	St Peter's	1996	United States	Mayor of Flint, Michigan (2009–2015)
Simon Chesterman	University of Melbourne	Magdalen	1997	Australia	International law professor and author from Australia
Nandini Das	Jadavpur University	University	1997	India	Academic of English literature
David Eadie		St Edmund	1997	South Africa	Cricketer
Tali Farhadian Weinstein	Yale University	Magdalen	1997	United States	Prosecutor and 2021 candidate for New York County District Attorney
Michael Fullilove	University of Sydney; University of New South Wales	Balliol	1997	Australia	Author and foreign policy commentator from Australia
Ross Garland	University of KwaZulu-Natal	Pembroke	1997	South Africa	Film producer, lawyer and cricketer
Alexandra Gillespie	Victoria University of Wellington	Corpus Christi	1997	New Zealand	Historian, vice-president of the University of Toronto and principal of the University of Toronto Mississauga (2020–2027)
Simon Hollingsworth	University of Tasmania	Exeter	1997	Australia	Olympic Games (1992, 1996) and Commonwealth Games (1990, 1994) athlete (400m hurdles) from Australia
Maryana Iskander	Rice University	Trinity	1997	United States	Social entrepreneur; lawyer; Chief Executive Officer of the Wikimedia Foundation
Ben Jealous	Columbia University	St Antony's	1997	United States	President and CEO of NAACP 2008–2013
Joanna Masel	University of Melbourne	Merton	1997	Australia	Theoretical evolutionary biologist
Tracey Poirier	Norwich University	Hertford	1997	United States	First female Vermont Army National Guard officer to attain general officer's rank
Pardis Sabeti	Massachusetts Institute of Technology	New	1997	United States	Computational biologist studying infectious diseases; 2014 Time Person of the Year; lead singer of the Thousand Days
Damon Salesa	University of Auckland	Oriel	1997	New Zealand	Pacific studies professor
Annette Salmeen	University of California, Los Angeles	St John's	1997	United States	American gold medalist in swimming at the 1996 Olympic Games
John Sauer	Duke University	Oriel	1997	United States	Former Solicitor General of Missouri, current Solicitor General of the United States
Michael Worobey	University of Arizona	St John's	1997	Canada	Evolutionary biologist; head of the University of Arizona Department of Ecology & Evolutionary Biology
Roy Bahat	Harvard University	Lincoln	1998	United States	Venture capitalist; head of Bloomberg Beta
James Edelman	University of Western Australia	Magdalen	1998	Australia	Justice of the High Court of Australia
Bryan Graham	Tufts University	St Antony's	1998	United States	Economics professor
Menaka Guruswamy	National Law School	University	1998	India	Senior Advocate at the Supreme Court of India
Patrick Hayden	McGill University	Balliol	1998	Canada	Quantum information theory and quantum computing professor
Leslie Kendrick	University of North Carolina at Chapel Hill	Magdalen	1998	United States	Legal scholar; dean of the University of Virginia School of Law (2024–present)
Sudhir Krishnaswamy	National Law School	University	1998	India	Vice-chancellor at the National Law School of India University
Raj Kumar	University of Madras; Delhi University	University	1998	India	Dean of the Jindal Global Law School
Eboo Patel	University of Illinois, Urbana-Champaign	Lady Margaret	1998	United States	Member of the White House Office of Faith-Based and Neighborhood Partnerships
Laura Provinzino	Lewis and Clark College	Balliol	1998	United States	Judge of the United States District Court for the District of Minnesota (2024–present)
Noam Scheiber	Tulane University	Magdalen	1998	United States	Reporter and news writer
Micah Schwartzman	University of Virginia	Balliol	1998	United States	Law professor
Malav Shroff		St Peter's	1998	India	Olympic sailor
Rachel Simmons	Vassar College	Lincoln	1998	United States	Author of Odd Girl Out: The Hidden Culture of Aggression in Girls (Harcourt, 2002)
Danny Sriskandarajah	University of Sydney	Magdalen	1998	Australia	Secretary General of CIVICUS
Elizabeth Stone	University of New South Wales	University	1998	Australia	Headmaster of Winchester College (2023–present)
Jake Sullivan	Yale University	Magdalen	1998	United States	U.S. National Security Adviser (2021–2025), National Security Advisor to the Vice President (2013–2014), Director of Policy Planning (2011–2013)
John Tye	Duke University	Lincoln	1998	United States	Whistleblower on US electronic surveillance
Manik Varma	St. Stephen's College, Delhi	Oriel	1998	India	Computer scientist
Jonathan Winkler		Queen's	1998	United States	Historian
M Niaz Asadullah	Aligarh Muslim University; Dhaka University	St Antony's	1999	Bangladesh	Economist
Antonio Delgado	Colgate University	Queen's	1999	United States	Lieutenant Governor of New York State (2022–present), former U.S. Representative (2019–2022)
Gemma Figtree		New	1999	Australia	Interventional cardiologist
Jon Finer	Harvard University	Balliol	1999	United States	United States Principal Deputy National Security Advisor (2021–present), Director of Policy Planning (2016–2017)
Mary Franks	Loyola University, New Orleans	Wadham	1999	United States	Law professor
Akash Kapur	Harvard University	Nuffield	1999	United States	Journalist and writer; author of India Becoming and Better to Have Gone
Robert McGill	Queen's University	Wadham	1999	Canada	Writer and literary critic
Aly Remtulla	Stanford University	Balliol	1999	Canada	International relations professor
Babar Sattar		Balliol	1999	Pakistan	Justice of the Islamabad High Court
Beth Shapiro	University of Georgia	Balliol	1999	United States	Evolutionary molecular biologist and MacArthur Fellowship recipient (2009)
Irvin Studin	York University	Corpus Christi	1999	Canada	Soccer midfielder, academic and magazine executive
Calvin Thigpen	University of Mississippi	Brasenose	1999	United States	Internist
Emma Brunskill	University of Washington	Magdalen	2000	United States	Computer scientist
Ben Cannon	Washington University	Corpus Christi	2000	United States	Oregon State Representative
Dev Gangjee	National Law School of India University	St Catherine's	2000	India	Professor of Intellectual Property Law at the Faculty of Law, University of Oxford
Neil Hanchard	University of the West Indies	Green	2000	Jamaica	National Human Genome Research Institute scientist
Cameron Hepburn	University of Melbourne	Magdalen	2000	Australia	Environmental economics professor
Marc Kielburger	Harvard University	Hertford	2000	Canada	Humanitarian activist from Canada, co-founder of Free the Children and Legacy+
Rachel Kleinfeld	Yale College	St Antony's	2000	United States	International relations scholar
Ilyana Kuziemko	Harvard University	Queen's	2000	United States	Economist
Boria Majumdar	University of Calcutta	St John's	2000	India	Sports journalist and historian
Gareth Morgan	University of Natal	Linacre	2000	South Africa	Member of Parliament (2004–2013)
Craig Mullaney	United States Military Academy	Lincoln	2000	United States	Veteran and author
Meghana Narayan	Bangalore University	Oriel	2000	India	International swimming champion from India
Jan Strugnell	James Cook University	Merton	2000	Australia	Evolutionary molecular biologist
Fasi Zaka	University of Peshawar	Somerville	2000	Pakistan	Pakistani political columnist, radio and TV show host, "Head of Ideas" for an advertising agency, 2012 World Economic Forum Young Global Leader
Seth Bodnar	United States Military Academy	Hertford	2001	United States	President of the University of Montana
Luke Bronin	Yale University	Balliol	2001	United States	Mayor of Hartford (2016–present)
Sara Bronin	University of Texas, Austin	Magdalen	2001	United States	Lawyer and architect
Josh Chafetz	Yale University	Merton	2001	United States	Agnes Williams Sesquicentennial Professor of Law and Politics at Georgetown University
Andrew Charlton	University of Sydney	St John's	2001	Australia	Australian politician and economist, member of the Australian Parliament
Phil Clark	Flinders University	Balliol	2001	Australia	Political scientist and cricketer
Karen-Mae Hill	University of Leicester	St Peter's	2001	Antigua and Barbuda	High Commissioner to the United Kingdom (2016–present)
Sarah Johnson	Washington University	Magdalen	2001	United States	Planetary scientist
Wes Moore	Johns Hopkins University	Wolfson	2001	United States	New York Times Bestselling Author, CEO of the Robin Hood Foundation, governor of Maryland
Alex Wyatt	University of Melbourne	New	2001	Australia	Cricketer
Kimberley Brownlee	McGill University; University of Cambridge	Corpus Christi	2002	Canada	Philosopher
Christian Campbell	Duke University	Balliol	2002	Commonwealth Caribbean	Trinidadian-Bahamian poet, essayist and critic
Steve Daley	University of Queensland	Magdalen	2002	Australia	Cricketer and veterinarian
Oeindrila Dube	Stanford University	Magdalen	2002	United States	Philip K. Pearson Professor of Global Conflict Studies at the Harris School of Public Policy
Trudi Makhaya		St Antony's	2002	South Africa	Economist and entrepreneur; economic advisor to President Cyril Ramaphosa
Matthews Mtumbuka	University of Malawi	Hertford	2002	Malawi	Member of the National Assembly of Malawi and CEO of the UbuntuNet Alliance
Lillian Pierce	Princeton University	Magdalen	2002	United States	Mathematician
Rob Porter	Harvard University	New	2002	United States	White House Staff Secretary (2017–2018)
Will Roper	Georgia Tech	University	2002	United States	Assistant Secretary of the Air Force (Acquisition, Technology and Logistics) (2018–2021) and director of the Strategic Capabilities Office in the Office of the Secretary of Defense (2012–2018)
Stephen E. Sachs	Harvard University	Merton	2002	United States	Legal scholar of originalism
PJ Thum	Harvard University	Hertford	2002	Singapore	Singaporean historian, civil rights activist, represented Singapore at the 1996 Olympic Games, Founder and Managing Director of New Naratif.)
Chesa Boudin	Yale University	St Antony's	2003	United States	American social activist in justice issues like parental incarceration, author of Gringo: A Coming of Age in Latin America (2009)
Dave Chokshi	Duke University	Trinity	2003	United States	Commissioner of Health of the City of New York (2020–2022)
Jeremy England	Harvard University	St John's	2003	United States	American physicist and proposer of "dissipative-driven adaptation"
Cyrus Habib	Columbia University	St John's	2003	United States	16th lieutenant governor of Washington, first Iranian-American elected to state-level office in the U.S.
Jonah Lehrer	Columbia University	Wolfson	2003	United States	Writer
Eusebius McKaiser	Rhodes University	St Antony's	2003	South Africa	South African political analyst and broadcaster
Jess Melbourne-Thomas	University of Tasmania	Linacre	2003	Australia	Marine ecologist
Sasha Polakow-Suransky	Brown University	St Antony's	2003	United States	Foreign policy journalist
Devi Sridhar	University of Miami	Wolfson	2003	United States	Public health researcher
Amit Suman		Pembroke	2003	India	Cricketer
Heidi Williams	Dartmouth College	Pembroke	2003	United States	Professor of economics at Dartmouth College; director of science policy at the Institute for Progress
Cyril Almeida	Lahore University of Management Sciences	Merton	2004	Pakistan	Journalist
Cristina Bejan	Northwestern University	Wadham	2004	United States	Poet and playwright
Jared Cohen	Stanford University	St John's	2004	United States	CEO of Jigsaw and an Adjunct Senior Fellow at the Council on Foreign Relations
Bethany Ehlmann	Washington University	Hertford	2004	United States	Planetary scientist; Director of the Laboratory for Atmospheric & Space Physics, University of Colorado Boulder
Tope Folarin	Morehouse College	Harris Manchester	2004	United States	Executive Director of the Institute for Policy Studies; award-winning author
Jennifer Harris	Wake Forest University	Pembroke	2004	United States	Foreign policy academic
Dan Helmer	United States Military Academy	Wolfson	2004	United States	Member of the Virginia House of Delegates
Heather Long	Wellesley College	Balliol	2004	United States	Economist and award-winning journalist
Salil Oberoi	St. Stephen's College, Delhi	Merton	2004	India	Cricketer
Joscelin Yeo	University of Texas at Austin	Wolfson	2004	Singapore	Swimmer and Nominated Member of Parliament (2006–2011)
Pete Buttigieg	Harvard University	Pembroke	2005	United States	U.S. Secretary of Transportation, 2020 Candidate for the Democratic Nomination for President, Mayor of South Bend, Indiana
Melissa Dell	Harvard University	Trinity	2005	United States	Professor of economics at Harvard University; awarded the 2020 John Bates Clark Medal
Catherine Frieman	Yale University	Merton	2005	United States	Associate professor of Archaeology at the Australian National University.
Andy Kim	Deep Springs College; University of Chicago	Magdalen	2005	United States	U.S. Senator from New Jersey (2025–present)
Neil Kruger		Green Templeton	2005	South Africa	Orthopedic surgeon and cricketer who has represented the Netherlands.
Atishi Marlena	St. Stephen's College, Delhi	Magdalen	2005	India	Member of the Delhi Legislative Assembly (2020–present)
Tucker Murphy	Dartmouth College	Merton	2005	Bermuda	Bermudan Cross Country skier and Winter Olympian.
Sabeel Rahman	Harvard University	Pembroke	2005	United States	President of Demos
Ravish Tiwari	IIT Bombay	Linacre	2005	India	Journalist; chief of the national bureau at The Indian Express
Tanmay Bharat		Hertford	2006	India	Programme leader at the MRC Laboratory of Molecular Biology
Sasha-Mae Eccleston	Brown University	Balliol	2006	United States	John Rowe Workman Assistant Professor of Classics at Brown University
Kate Harris	University of North Carolina	Hertford	2006	Canada	Author
Garrett Johnson	Florida State University	Exeter	2006	United States	Co-founder of SendHub, All-American athlete (shot put)
Rosara Joseph	University of Canterbury	St John's	2006	New Zealand	2006 Commonwealth Games and 2008 Olympic Games cyclist from New Zealand
Noorain Khan	Rice University	St. Antony's	2006	United States	President of Girl Scouts of the USA
Jeffrey Miller	Princeton University	Magdalen	2006	United States	Literary scholar
Jen Robinson	Australian National University	Balliol	2006	Australia	Human rights lawyer
Heidi Stöckl	LMU Munich; Free University of Berlin	Nuffield	2006	Germany	Sociologist
Katharine Wilkinson	Sewanee: The University of the South	Trinity	2006	United States	Writer and climate change activist
Casey Cep	Harvard University	Magdalen	2007	United States	Staff writer for The New Yorker
Lisa Herzog		New	2007	Germany	German philosopher and social scientist
Maria Repnikova	Georgetown University	St Antony's	2007	United States	Political scientist
Maya Shankar	Yale University	New	2007	United States	Cognitive scientist; senior Advisor at the White House Office of Science and Technology Policy (2013–2017)
Amia Srinivasan	Yale University	Christ Church	2007	United States	Political philosopher
Holly Walker	University of Otago	University	2007	New Zealand	Member of the New Zealand Parliament (2011–2014)
Leana Wen	Washington University	Merton	2007	United States	American physician, Baltimore Health Commissioner, and author of When Doctors Don't Listen: How to Avoid Misdiagnoses and Unnecessary Tests
Sherif Girgis	Princeton University	Merton	2008	United States	Law professor
Renée Hložek	University of Pretoria; University of Cape Town	Christ Church	2008	South Africa	Astrophysics professor
Joanna Howe		Merton	2008	Australia	Expert in temporary labour migration and anti-abortion advocate
Sam Stranks	University of Adelaide	St John's	2008	Australia	Professor of Optoelectronics in the Department of Chemical Engineering and Biotechnology, University of Cambridge
Abdul El-Sayed	University of Michigan	Oriel	2009	United States	United States Senator for Michigan
Kingwa Kamencu	University of Nairobi	Wolfson	2009	Kenya	2012 presidential candidate for Kenya
Nanjala Nyabola	University of Birmingham	Harris Manchester	2009	Kenya	Writer and political activist
Myron Rolle	Florida State University	St Edmund	2009	United States	All-ACC defensive back for Florida State Seminoles; selected by the Tennessee Titans in the 2010 NFL draft; Bahamian-American; played for the Tennessee Titans and the Pittsburgh Steelers. Neurosurgeon. Author
Abigail Seldin	University of Pennsylvania	St Antony's	2009	United States	Education technology philanthropist
Kathryn Twyman		Merton	2009	Canada	Rower for Great Britain at the 2011 World Rowing Championships
Shad White	University of Mississippi	St John's	2009	United States	State Auditor of Mississippi (2019–present)
Raph Graybill	Columbia University	Magdalen	2010	United States	2020 nominee for Attorney General of Montana
Kopano Matlwa	University of Cape Town	Magdalen	2010	South Africa	Novelist and physician
Mari Rabie	Stellenbosch University	St Catherine's	2010	South Africa	2006 Commonwealth Games and 2008 Olympic Games triathlete from South Africa
Gautam Bhatia	National Law School	Balliol	2011	India	Constitutional law scholar and science fiction author
Varun Sivaram	Stanford University	St John's	2011	United States	American energy expert, CTO of ReNew Power, and author of Taming the Sun: Innovations to Harness Solar Energy and Power the Planet (2018)
Angie Darby		Christ Church	2012	Australia	Olympic modern pentathlete
Ronan Farrow	Bard College, Simon's Rock; Bard College; Yale University	Magdalen	2012	United States	American human rights activist, senior foreign policy official in the Obama administration, U.S. State Department special adviser on global youth issues and Pulitzer Prize-winning journalist
Joy Buolamwini	Georgia Institute of Technology	Jesus	2013	United States	Founder of the Algorithmic Justice League
Julian Gewirtz	Harvard College	St Edmund	2013	United States	Deputy coordinator for global China affairs at the Department of State; director for China at the United States National Security Council
Rhiana Gunn-Wright	Yale University	St John's	2013	United States	Climate Policy Director at the Roosevelt Institute
Rachel Riley	Wofford College	Brasenose	2013	United States	Management consultant; acting chief of Naval Research (2025–present)
Shamma Al Mazrui	New York University, Abu Dhabi	University	2014	United Arab Emirates	United Arab Emirates Minister of Youth
Heerden Herman	Stellenbosch University	Exeter	2014	South Africa	Olympic freestyle swimmer
Amba Kak	West Bengal National University of Juridical Sciences	Mansfield	2014	India	Technology policy strategist and researcher; executive director of the AI Now Institute
Ntokozo Qwabe	University of KwaZulu-Natal; University of Cape Town	Keble	2014	South Africa	Co-founder of Rhodes Must Fall
Finn Lowery	University of Auckland	University	2015	New Zealand	Water polo player and lawyer
Billy-Ray Belcourt	University of Alberta	Wadham	2016	Canada	Driftpile Cree Nation poet
Léo Bureau-Blouin	University of Montreal	University	2016	Canada	Member of the National Assembly of Quebec (2012–2014)
Sherona Forrester	University of the West Indies	Linacre	2016	Jamaica	Footballer
Jade Leung	University of Auckland	Linacre	2016	New Zealand	Artificial intelligence ethics researcher
Naying Ren	Tsinghua University	Linacre	2016	China	Queer rights activist
Maike van Niekerk	Dalhousie University	St John's	2017	Canada	Cancer research activist
Dubai Abulhoul	New York University Abu Dhabi	Trinity	2017	United Arab Emirates	Author; columnist for Al-Bayan and Gulf Today
Oscar De Los Santos	University of Southern California	St Antony's	2017	United States	Member of the Arizona House of Representatives (2023–present) and minority leader (2024–present)
Simone Askew	United States Military Academy	Magdalen	2018	United States	United States Army captain; first African American woman to be first captain of the United States Military Academy
Jamie Beaton	Harvard University; Stanford University	St John's	2018	New Zealand	Founder of Crimson Education
Jasmine Brown	Washington University	Hertford	2018	United States	Author
Yifan Hou	Peking University	St Hilda's	2018	China	Former women's world champion of chess
Jaz Brisack	University of Mississippi	Wadham	2019	United States	Labor organizer
Maddy Tung	United States Air Force Academy	Oriel	2019	United States	First female wrestler and wrestling national champion at the U.S. Air Force Academy
Wawa Gatheru	University of Connecticut	St John's	2020	United States	Climate justice activist
Summia Tora	Earlham College	Somerville	2020	Afghanistan	Activist and social entrepreneur
Justin Clarke	University of Queensland	Magdalen	2021	Australia	Australian rules footballer for Brisbane Lions
Sonita Alizadeh	Bard College	St John's	2023	Afghanistan	Rapper and activist against forced marriage
Trinity Lowthian	University of Ottawa		2026	Canada	Paralympic fencer
