= Robert Burton =

English scholar and author (1577–1640)

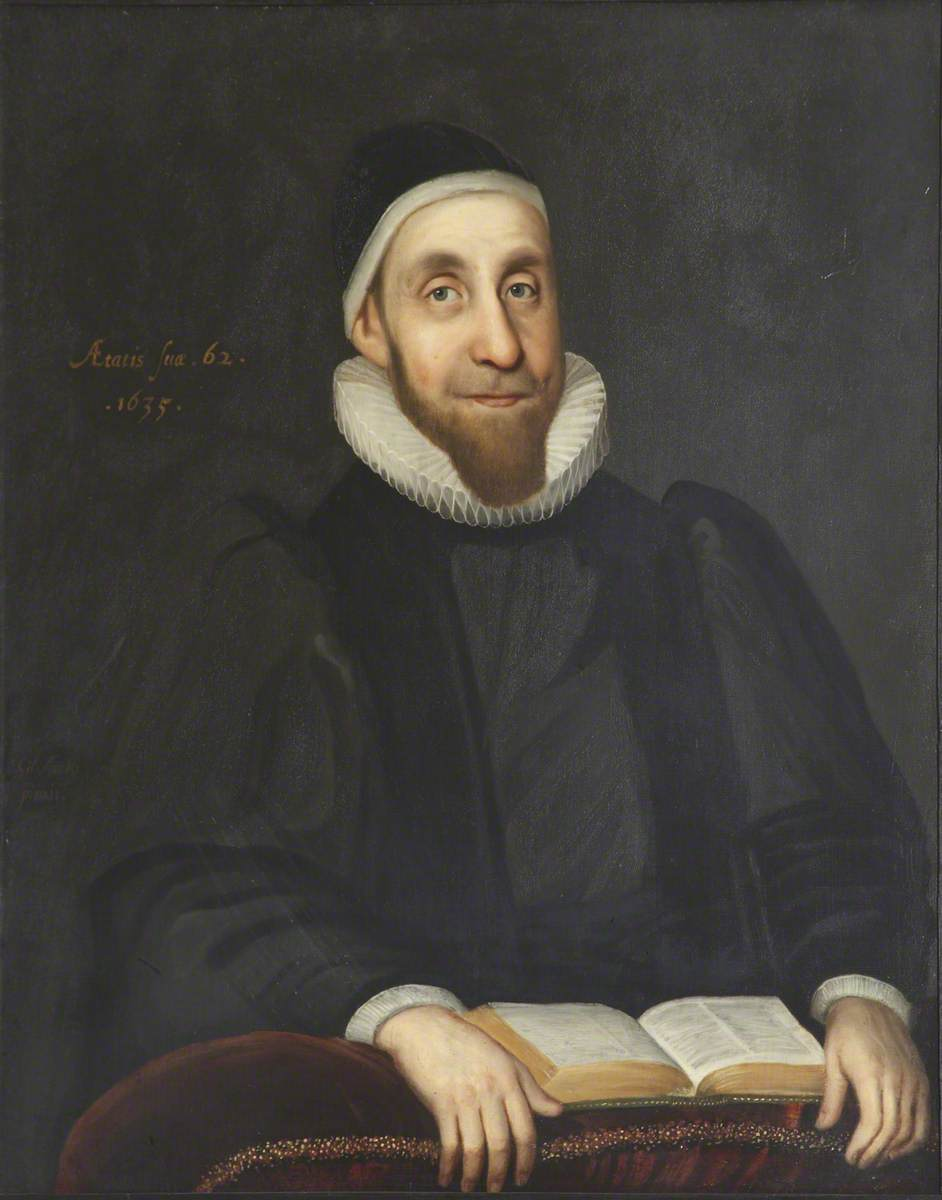
- Portrait of Robert Burton by Gilbert Jackson, 1635
- Born: 8 February 1577; Lindley, Leicestershire, England
- Died: 25 January 1640 (aged 62); Oxford, Oxfordshire, England
- Resting place: Christ Church Cathedral
- Education: Christ Church, Oxford (BA, 1602; MA, 1605; BD, 1614)
- Writing career
- Pen name: Democritus Junior
- Notable works: The Anatomy of Melancholy; Philosophaster

Robert Burton (8 February 1577 – 25 January 1640; sometimes writing under the pen name Democritus Junior) (Note: After the ancient Greek philosopher Democritus.) was an English author and fellow of Oxford University, known for his encyclopaedic The Anatomy of Melancholy.

Born in 1577 to a comfortably well-off family of the landed gentry, Burton attended two grammar schools and matriculated at Brasenose College, Oxford in 1593, age 15. Burton's education at Oxford was unusually lengthy, possibly drawn out by an affliction of melancholy, and saw an early transfer to Christ Church. Burton received an MA and BD, and by 1607 was qualified as a tutor. As early as 1603, Burton indulged in some early literary creations at Oxford, including Latin poems, a now-lost play performed before and panned by King James I himself, and his only surviving play: an academic satire called Philosophaster. This work, though less well regarded than Burton's masterpiece, has "received more attention than most of the other surviving examples of university drama".

Sometime after obtaining his MA in 1605, Burton made some attempts to leave the university. Though he never fully succeeded, he managed to obtain the living of St Thomas the Martyr's Church, Oxford through the university, and external patronage for the benefice of Walesby and the rectorship of Seagrave. As a fellow of Oxford, he served in many minor administrative roles and as the librarian of Christ Church Library from 1624 until his death. Over time he came to accept his "sequestered" existence in the libraries of Oxford, speaking highly of his alma mater throughout the Anatomy.

Burton's most famous work and greatest achievement was The Anatomy of Melancholy. First published in 1621, it was reprinted with additions from Burton no fewer than five times. A digressive and labyrinthine work, Burton wrote as much to alleviate his own melancholy as to help others. The final edition totalled more than 500,000 words. The book is permeated by quotations from and paraphrases of many authorities, both classical and contemporary, the culmination of a lifetime of erudition.

Burton died in 1640. Within the university, his death was (probably falsely) rumoured to have been a suicide. His large personal library was divided between the Bodleian and Christ Church. The Anatomy was perused and plagiarised by many authors during his lifetime and after his death, but entered a lull in popularity through the 18th century. It was only the revelation of Laurence Sterne's plagiarism that revived interest in Burton's work into the 19th century, especially among the Romantics. The Anatomy received more academic attention in the 20th and 21st centuries. Whatever his popularity, Burton has always attracted distinguished readers, including Samuel Johnson, Benjamin Franklin, John Keats, William Osler, and Samuel Beckett.

== Early life and education ==
=== Family and grammar school ===
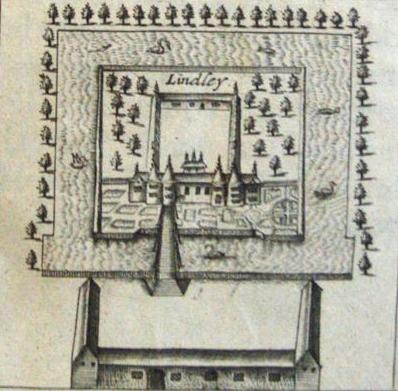
Lindley Hall, the Burton family manor, as depicted in a stylised frontispiece to William Burton's Description of Leicestershire (1622). The manor was a medieval foundation, inherited affinially by the Burton family, and torn down in the 17th century.

Robert Burton was born on 8 February 1577, to Ralph Burton (1547–1619) and his wife, Dorothy (née Faunt; 1560–1629), in Lindley, Leicestershire. Burton believed himself to have been conceived at 9 PM on 25 May 1576, a fact he often used in his astrological calculations. He was the second of four sons and fourth of ten children; his elder brother, William, is the only other member of the family for whom we know more than minor biographical details, as he later became a noted antiquarian and topographer. (Note: Ralph, and later his son William Burton, recorded the names and birthdates of ten Burton children: Elizabeth (b. 7 July 1573), Anne (b. 5 July 1574), William (b. 24 August 1575), Robert (b. 8 February 1577), Mary (b. 13 July 1578), George (b. 28 August 1579), Jane (b. 17 October 1580), Ralph (b. 3 July 1582), Catherine (b. 22 October 1584), and Dorothy (who died in infancy).) Both his parents' families were members of the landed gentry, with the Burtons from an old, if undistinguished, pedigree. Robert may have inherited his medical interest; in the Anatomy, he writes of his mother's "excellent skill in chirurgery". (Note: According to Michael O'Connell: "'Chirurgery' here does not have quite our modern sense of surgery [...] [it] had still its etymological sense of medicine practised by the hands and would include such things as bone-setting and the treatment of sprains and lacerations.") William states a member of their mother's family, Anthony Faunt, was said to have died from "the passion of melancholy", and speaks fondly the family's maternal relation to Arthur Faunt, a Jesuit controversialist and uncle to William and Robert.

Burton probably attended two grammar schools, the King Edward VI Grammar School, Nuneaton and Bishop Vesey's Grammar School, Sutton Coldfield. (Note: In the Anatomy, Burton indicated he studied at Sutton Coldfield, while his will states he was a "Grammar Scholar" at Nuneaton. The biographer Jean Robert Simon first identified the schools as those above, but admits that neither has Burton's name in their archives.) Burton wrote in the Anatomy that students "think no slavery in the world (as once I did myself) like to that of a Grammar Scholar", which some writers have taken as suggestion that he was an unhappy schoolboy. More modern biographers, such as R. L. Nochimson and Michael O'Connell, have regarded it as Burton merely presenting what was a popular sentiment, rather than hinting at any personal dislike or source of childhood melancholy.

=== Oxford education ===
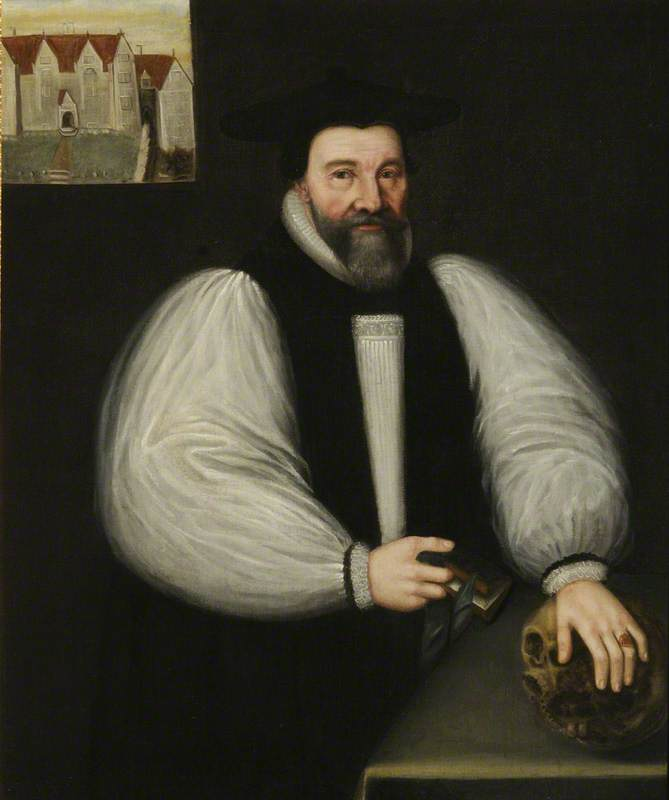
John Bancroft, Burton's tutor at Christ Church, and a lifelong friend. In the left corner is a view of Bancroft's palace near Oxford, Cuddesdon, which Burton praised in the Anatomy, suggesting he was a frequent visitor to his old tutor's estate.

In July 1593, aged 15, Burton matriculated into Brasenose College, Oxford, where his elder brother was already attending. Burton did not receive his Bachelor's until 30 June 1602 after he migrated to Christ Church College in 1599. For the time between his matriculation and his transfer, almost nothing is known of Burton. According to Anthony à Wood, Burton "made considerable progress in logic and philosophy" at Brasenose, though the college left an impression sufficiently weak that Burton himself made no mention of Brasenose in his corpus. Most Oxford students would have completed their education at nineteen, but by 1602, Burton was twenty-six. Some biographers, such as Michael O'Connell and J. B. Bamborough, have cited this as evidence Burton suffered some lengthy illness while a student, possibly melancholy. Record has been found of one "Robart Burton of 20 yeres", a patient of London doctor and astrologist Simon Forman, who was treated for melancholy over a period of five months in 1597. (Note: "Robart Burton"'s connection to the scholar Burton is suggested not only by the "coincidence of name and age", but by Burton's later familiarity towards London, and the indication he was closely acquainted with Foreman from Burton's astrological notebooks. In these notebooks, Burton attributes a test for virginity used in judicial astrology to Foreman, a test which Foreman never published, suggesting Burton knew Foreman personally.) Indeed, 1596 and 1597 are the only years of Burton's maturity in which he seems to have purchased no new books.

When he entered Christ Church in 1599, Wood reports Burton was assigned as tutor John Bancroft, "for form sake, tho' he wanted not a tutor"; though Bancroft was only three years his senior, he was six or seven years ahead of Burton in his studies, and was well-connected within the church, (Note: John was the nephew of Richard Bancroft, Bishop of London and later Archbishop of Canterbury. As Archbishop, Richard ensured his nephew's political advancement, granting him various sinecures, and aiding his election to the Mastership of University College.) later becoming the Bishop of Oxford. It seems some friendship developed between the two; Burton praised Bancroft's construction at Cuddesdon in the Anatomy, implying he was a frequent visitor. At Christ Church, Burton proceeded to an MA on 9 June 1605, and a BD in May 1614. Simultaneously, Burton rose through the college ranks, attaining disciplus in 1599, philosophus secundi vicenarii in 1603, and philosophus primi vicenarii in 1607, the last of which qualified him as a tutor. Sometime after he obtained his MA, Bamborough considers it likely Burton was attempting to leave the university. The college statutes required Burton to take a BD after his MA, but Burton chose not to proceed to DD.

=== Early writings and plays ===
While at Oxford, Burton indulged his literary interests alongside these academic ones. In 1603, on the accession of James I, Burton contributed a short Latin verse celebrating the event to a commemorative Oxford volume; he made similar offering of twenty-one poems upon James's royal Oxford visit in 1605. On this visit, Burton took active part in the "praeparation for the Kinges cominge", including a play he composed for the occasion. This play, since lost, has been identified with Alba, a pastoral comedy with a mythological subject matter, probably written in Latin. The play was performed before James I on 27 August 1605. According to a witness of the events, Philip Stringer, Burton's play was poorly received by James and his court. The queen consort and her ladies took offence at several "almost naked" male actors, probably portraying satyrs, and the king was so displeased by the production that the chancellors of both Oxford and Cambridge had to plead for him to stay, as otherwise he "would have gone before half the Comedy had been ended".

However Burton reacted to this royal pan, he was already at work on another play by 1606. This play, Philosophaster—which is fully extant across three manuscripts—was finished by 1615, by which time Burton was revising and correcting it. Burton speaks briefly of Philosophaster in the Anatomy, mentioning that it was performed at Christ Church on 16 February 1617, during the Shrovetide festivities. The play was acted by the students alongside three local townsmen. Burton likely took a view towards pleasing the administration in this production. The play cast the son of John King, then Dean of Christ Church, in a leading role, and departed from Alba's controversial mythological themes for the less contentious ones of an academic satire.

== Appointments and the Anatomy ==
=== Offices at St Thomas's, Walesby, and Seagrave ===
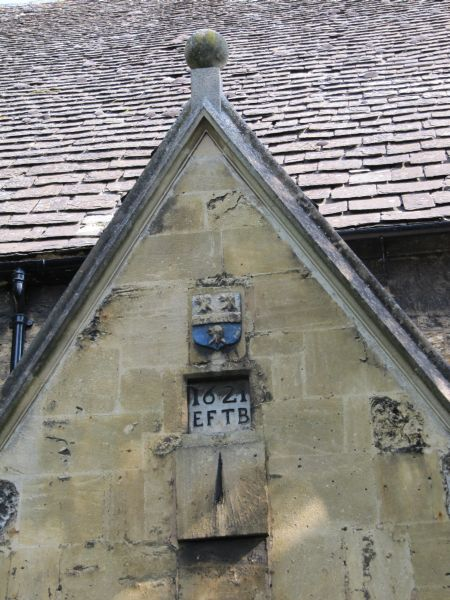
Burton's arms above the gable of the south porch, at St Thomas the Martyr's Church, Oxford.

Burton initially struggled to find any patrons for promotion out of the university, but after some time, he managed to obtain an ecclesiastical office in the living of St Thomas the Martyr's Church, Oxford, located in the western suburb of Oxford. He was nominated to this by the dean and chapter of Christ Church on 29 November 1616. He was licensed to preach on 3 December 1618. Burton held this vicarage at St Thomas's, until his death; he was responsible for the building or rebuilding of the church's south porch in 1621, where his arms were placed on the gable.

In 1624, Lady Frances Cecil, dowager Countess of Exeter presented Burton to the Lincolnshire benefice of Walesby. Burton was perhaps the tutor of Frances' son, Robert Smith. Burton chose not to reside in Walesby, though he probably visited it at some point. He took little interest in the daily affairs of the parish—all the parish records were signed by his curate, Thomas Benson—but did win for it nine acres of land which had been taken by Frances's predecessor. Burton resigned from this post in 1631. In the 1632 edition of the Anatomy, appended below a mention of his Walesby appointment, Burton tersely added: "Lately resigned for some special reasons". After his resignation, Lady Frances temporarily turned over the duty to appoint Burton's successor to her friend, the first Earl of Middlesex, suggesting that Burton resigned over Middlesex's pressure to appoint his own favourite.

In 1632, shortly after this resignation from Walesby, Burton was presented to a much more valuable office by his patron, Lord Berkeley: the rectorship of Seagrave. Berkeley had been a patron of Burton since at least 1621, when Burton dedicated the Anatomy to Lord Berkeley. Their relationship may have begun even earlier, in 1619, when Berkeley matriculated from Christ Church, and perhaps entered the tutelage of Burton. In any case, on 3 September 1624, Lord Berkeley granted Burton the advowson (i.e. the right to decide the next occupant) of the wealthy living of Seagrave. This right necessitated that the holder of the advowson pick a candidate other than himself, but three days later Burton assigned three of his family members to this position, so he could procure his own future appointment. On 15 June 1632, promptly after the previous incumbent was buried, the relatives presented him to the office. Burton did not cultivate much of a reputation as a preacher while at Seagrave, choosing not to publish any of his sermons, but discharged the pastoral and charitable roles of the rectory dutifully and punctually. Burton probably visited Lindley often while at Seagrave, as the villages were only 20 miles apart. The office was the most valuable Burton ever held; in 1650, the rectory was valued at £100. (Note: Adjusting for inflation, equivalent to £15,707 in 2025.)

=== University life ===
Other than that afforded to him by the Countess of Exeter and Lord Berkeley, Burton received little preferment. Because of this, even as he received appointments outside the university, Burton remained an Oxford student for the rest of his life. Burton seems to have been, at first, unhappy with this situation; in the 1621 edition of the Anatomy, Burton wrote that his "hopes were still frustrate, and I left behind, as a Dolphin on shore, confined to my Colledge, as Diogenes to his tubbe". This exasperation seems to have been passing; by the Anatomy's final edition, he had revised the passage in praise of his "monastick life [...] sequestered from those tumults & troubles of the world", unindebted for his lack of preferment. Bamborough has gone as far as to claim it is unlikely Burton ever truly wanted to leave the college he spoke so highly of as the "most flourishing College of Europe", one which "can brag with Jovius, almost, in that splendor of Vaticanish retirement, confined to the company of the distinguished". The 1602 reopening of the Bodleian Library at Oxford, which by 1620 held over 16,000 volumes, gave some truth to Burton's proud comparison of the scholarship at Oxford to that of Jovius's Vatican.

Burton did not spend all his time in this "Vaticanish retirement" as a scholar. He held various minor offices in Oxford. On three occasions–in 1615, 1617, and 1618–Burton was chosen to be the clerk of the Market, one of two MA students tasked with regulating the various goods of Oxford's markets. Now a sinecure, the office was an important institution in Burton's time. This occupation has been cited by two biographers, O'Connell and Nochimson, to suggest, contrary to the bookish image given by his Anatomy, Burton had some knowledge of the day-to-day affairs of Oxford. Perhaps more befitting his image, on 27 August 1624, Burton became the librarian of Christ Church Library. The office was a recent creation—the first librarian was appointed in 1599, and library had been founded only a half-century earlier—but a recent donation by an Otho Nicholson (Note: Otho Nicholson was a wealthy lawyer of the Court of Chancery, who made a large donation to the library in the early 17th century: £800 for the building and £100 for books.) had ensured it was a profitable one, tripling the incumbent's wages to 10s a term. The duties, however, were sparse—limited to enforcing the loose regulations of the institution, and opening and closing it at the appropriate times—probably allowing Burton more than enough time to accumulate the erudition exhibited in the Anatomy. Burton held this position until his death. In 1635, painter Gilbert Jackson produced an oil portrait of Burton; this painting is now held at Brasenose College, with a copy at Christ Church. (Note: Some aspersions have been cast over Jackson's authorship of the Burton portrait (alongside a Wadham College portrait of Warden, William Smyth) by British historian Reginald Lane Poole because–as Jackson's biographer Arianne Burnette has put it–the portraits exhibit an unusually "flat, archaic handling and lack of characterization" when compared with Jackson's other work.)

=== Publication of the Anatomy ===
Bibliographical information for Burton's Anatomy.
| Date | Edition | Binding | Location | Words |
|---|---|---|---|---|
| 1621 | 1st | 4to | Oxford | 353,369 |
| 1624 | 2nd | fo | Oxford | 423,983 |
| 1628 | 3rd | fo | Oxford | 476,855 |
| 1632 | 4th | fo | Oxford | 505,592 |
| 1638 | 5th | fo | Oxford | 514,116 |
| 1651 | 6th | fo | Oxford | 516,384 |
| 1660 | 7th | fo | London | 516,384 |
| 1676 | 8th | fo | London | 516,384 |

Whatever other activities he engaged in, composing the Anatomy was the most important pursuit and accomplishment of Burton's life. Burton, as he claims in the preface, was "as desirous to suppress my labours in this kind, as others have been to press and publish theirs", but admits that melancholy is the subject upon which he is "fatally driven", and so he was compelled to compose the work. Burton left no record of when he began his work on the Anatomy. O'Connell speculates the project grew piecemeal, with research begun in his twenties, and the work well on its way by his thirties. Burton explicitly states that the study of melancholy was a lifelong fascination of his, and regularly "deducted from the main channel of my studies". However long the work took, he had certainly concluded it by 5 December 1620, aged 43, when he signed the "Conclusion to the Reader".

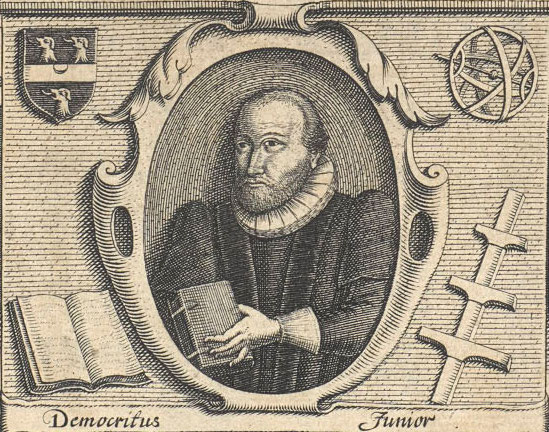
Engraving of Burton, under the name Democritus Junior, in the frontispiece to his Anatomy of Melancholy. This engraving is from the 1628 edition.

The book was printed in 1621 and, despite Burton's indication in the Anatomy of troubles finding a publisher, it quickly sold well. Wood wrote that the publisher, Henry Cripps, made such a "great profit" off the book that he "got an estate by it". Burton's subject was well chosen; similar treatises by Timothie Bright and Thomas Wright had gone through several editions soon after their publication. Though Burton never divulged the extent of his profits, the size of his estate and library at death suggests they were considerable. Burton printed the Anatomy under the pseudonym of "Democritus Junior", alluding to the Greek pre-Socratic philosopher, Democritus, sometimes known as the Laughing Philosopher. The use of an established classical figure in a pseudonym was common practice in Burton's time, used to ensure the reader held no negative preconceptions about the author. Burton did not resolutely stick to this pseudonymity; the first edition betrayed it as he signed the "Conclusion to the Reader" with his real name, and though this was removed in later editions, the portrait of Burton added from the third edition onwards hardly preserved his anonymity.

Burton did not rest on his laurels after the first printing, continually editing and improving the work throughout his life. The first edition of Burton's Anatomy was, with marginalia, over 350,000 words long; by his final edition this count came to over 500,000. The additions were largest for the second and third editions; the original quarto volume had to be expanded to a folio for the second edition (1624) to accommodate the expansions. For the third edition (1628), an allegorical frontispiece was added, engraved by Christian Le Blon, with a portrait of Burton atop his moniker "Democritus Junior". (Note: Various minor additions were added to the frontispiece over the course of its printing, including in a skull cap added to Burton's portrait in the fifth edition. This last addition has caused some academic consternation over its possible significance.) After these two additions, Burton vowed: "Ne quid nimis [do not do too much]. I will not hereafter add, alter, or retract; I have done." However, once again, Burton returned to the Anatomy, producing two more editions in 1634 and 1638. Shortly before his death in 1640, Burton entrusted an annotated copy of the Anatomy to his publisher, which was published posthumously in 1651. In total, Burton made contributions to six editions. Two more reprints of the Anatomy were made before the end of the century.

== Death ==
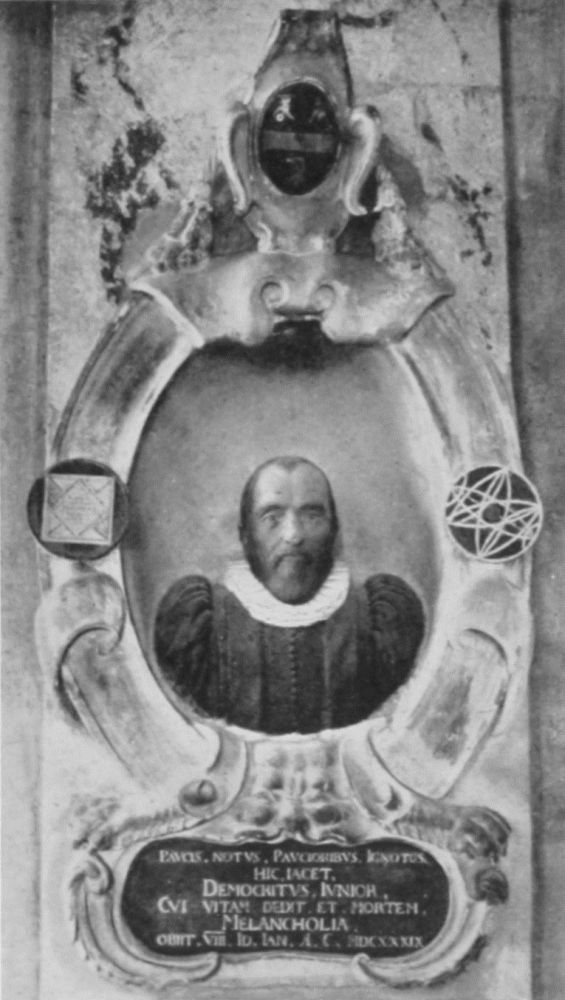
Burton's monument in Christ Church Cathedral, Oxford.

Burton drew up his will on 15 August 1639. Five months later, aged 62 and on 25 January 1640, he was dead. The will divided his inherited estates up among his elder brother, William, and William's heirs. Outside of his family, his largest bequests went, unsurprisingly, to the Bodleian and Christ Church libraries, with gifts of £100 each, and Burton's large library split between the institutions. He also laid out several smaller monetary donations: those to his servants; the servants at Christ Church; the poor in Seagrave, Nuneaton, and Higham; the library at Brasenose; and various friends and colleagues, including John Bancroft. Burton was buried in the north aisle of Christ Church Cathedral, Oxford, on 27 January. William erected a monument to Robert Burton in the cathedral: a coloured effigy of Robert, flanked by an astrological representation of his nativity and geometric instruments, with a short Latin epitaph below, said to have been composed by Burton.

Writing near the close of the 17th century, John Aubrey records a rumour circulated among Oxford students, asserting that Burton took his own life. The students, according to the testimony of Wood, embellished the story to the point that Burton was supposed to have "sent up his soul to heaven thro' a slip about his neck" in order that the date of his death would fit his exact astrological calculations. This rumour is dubious, and has been largely rejected by biographers as far back as Wood. (Note: Though he ultimately rejects it, Simon entertains the possibility of Burton's suicide, as Burton described himself as "at this present [...] in perfect health of Bodie and Mind" in his will, five months before his supposedly natural death. Nochimson reconciles this by pointing out that this was a generic formulation in English wills, rather than any specific reference to Burton's health, and it was more common for wills be composed when the author felt themselves close to death.) Angus Gowland, in his 2006 study of Burton, is among the few who take the allegation seriously, though he admits it is "no more than a melancholy rumour". The story about the astrological calculation was told of astrologers before Burton, Burton rejected the endorsements of suicide by classical authors in the Anatomy, and if the rumours were taken to have had any substance at the time of his death, Burton would not have been buried in the cathedral. Gowland counters this evidence, citing the charity shown by Burton in the Anatomy for those tempted by suicide, and conjecturing a conspiracy of the "notoriously close-knit College" to keep Burton's suicide secret.

== The Anatomy of Melancholy ==
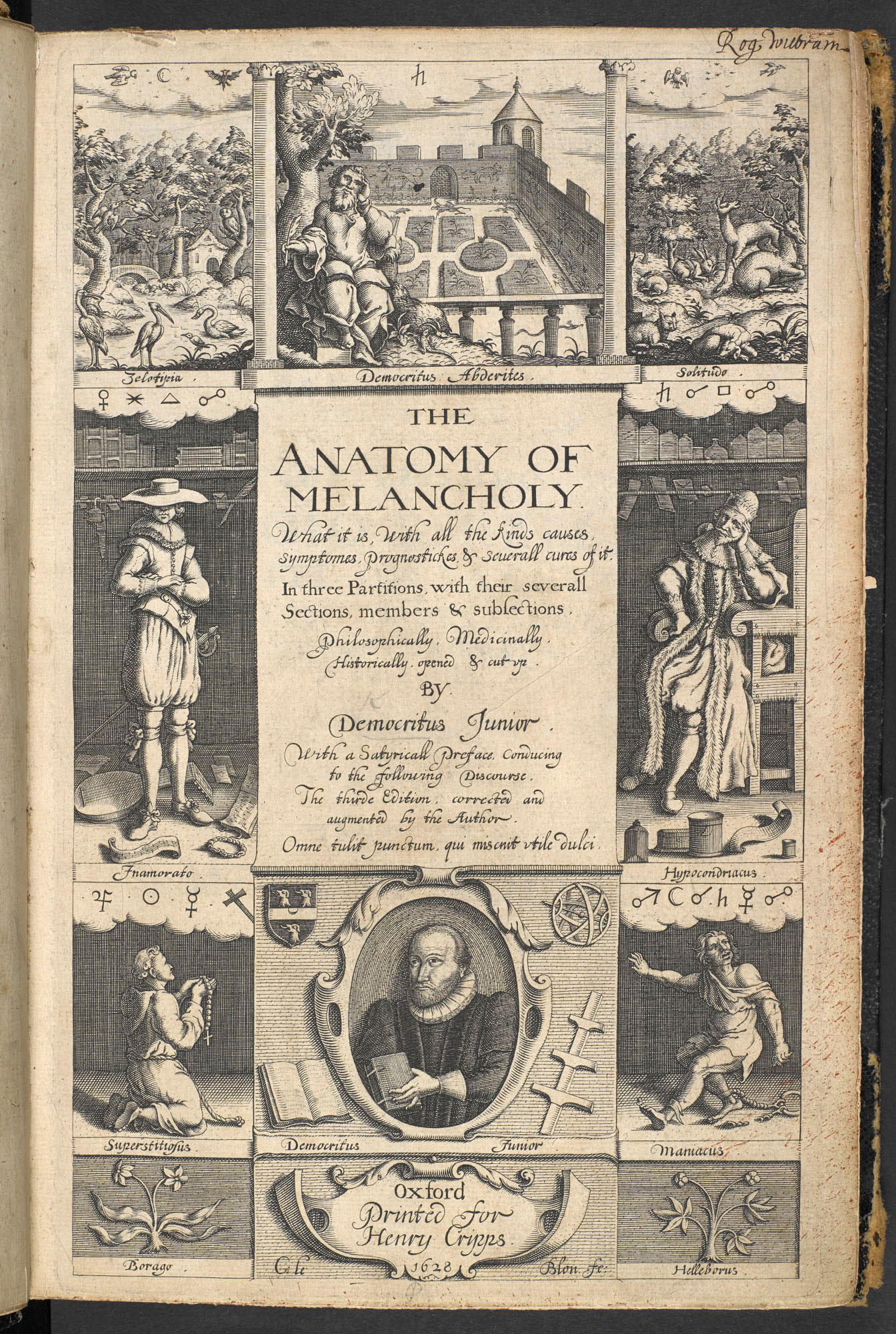
Frontispiece of the 1628 edition of The Anatomy of Melancholy

Though Burton wrote elsewhere, Bamborough regards Burton's one truly great work as The Anatomy of Melancholy. Ostensibly a three-part treatise on depression and its treatment, the book consists of quotations from, paraphrases of and commentary on numerous authors, from many fields of learning, and ranging from classical times to his contemporaries, in a "tangled web of opinion and authority". According to Wood, Burton was apparently famed at Oxford employing this prose style in his speech, effortlessly recalling passages as he spoke. The Anatomy is digressive and confusing in its structure; Burton himself apologetically admitted to "bring[ing] forth this confused lump", excusing himself over a shortage of time. Over the five editions, he did little to amend this confusion, preferring to append more to the labyrinthine text. The book is the fruit of a lifetime's worth of learning, though Burton makes a point throughout the Anatomy to claim that erudition is ultimately pointless, and that it is perhaps better to remain ignorant. Nonetheless, he was of the opinion that if one had knowledge, one better display it. And he was not able to resist his impulse "to have an Oare in every mans Boat", that is, to know something of every topic.

Burton wrote The Anatomy of Melancholy largely to write himself out of being a lifelong sufferer from depression. As he described his condition in the preface "Democritus Junior to the Reader", "a kind of imposthume in my head, which I was very desirous to be unladen of and could imagine no fitter evacuation than this ... I write of melancholy, by being busy to avoid melancholy. There is no greater cause of melancholy than idleness, no better cure than business". In his view, melancholy was "a disease so frequent ... in our miserable times, as few there are that feele not the smart of it", and he said he compiled his book "to prescribe means how to prevent and cure so universall a malady, an Epidemicall disease, that so often, so much crucifies the body and mind". For Burton, "melancholy" describes a range of mental abnormalities, from obsession to delusion to what we would now call clinical depression. Burton at once gives a multitude of remedies for melancholy, and warns they are all ultimately useless, in characteristic self-contradiction.

== Philosophaster ==
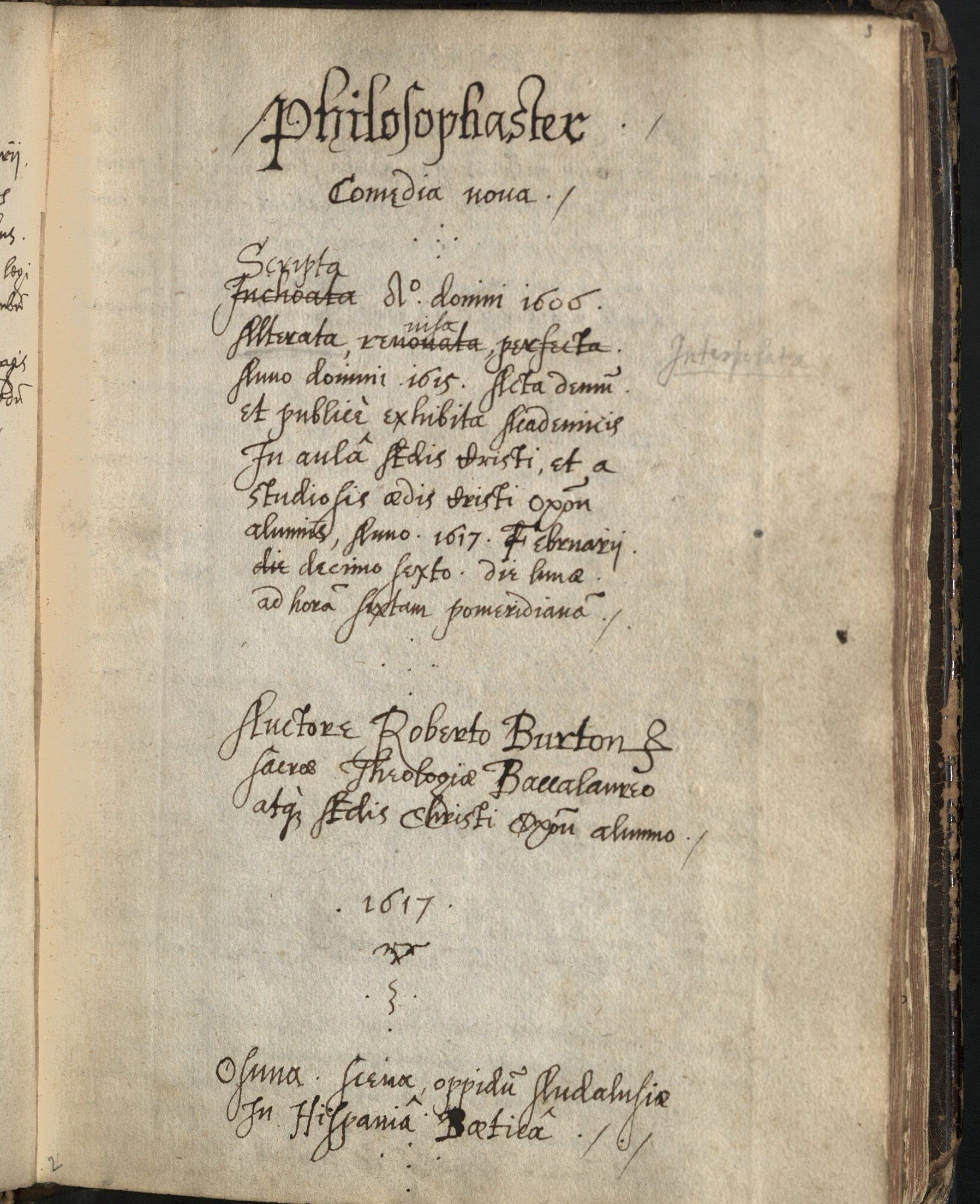
Title page of the manuscript of Burton's Philosophaster.

Philosophaster is a play, satirising on the 17th-century university, composed in Latin during Burton's time as an Oxford student. The plot of Philosophaster follows the university of Osuna in Andalusia, (Note: Such a University of Osuna exists, founded in 1548.) recently founded by one Desiderius, Duke of Osuna, in hope of attracting scholars. However, the university actually attracts a crowd of philosophasters—pseudo-philosophers, Jesuits, and prostitutes—who con the Duke and townspeople into believing their disguises, capitalising on their naïveté in a series of farcical scenes. Amidst this chaos, two true philosophers, Polumathes and Philobiblos (their names literally meaning "Much-Learned" and "Lover of Books") appear and unmask the philosophasters. The resultant controversy among the townspeople nearly causes the Duke to close the university, but he is persuaded otherwise by Polumathes. In the comic climax, the fraudsters are branded and exiled, two characters marry, and the play concludes with a "hymn in praise of philosophy [...] to the tune of Bonny Nell".

As Connie McQuillen has put it, the distinguishing quality Philosophaster is the "patchwork of borrowings" with which it was written. Stylistically, Philosophaster is declared on the title page to be a Comoedia Nova (or New Comedy), a satirical genre Kathryn Murphy describes as "in the tradition of Plautus and Terence". (Note: According to the Encyclopaedia Britannica, New Comedy was genre of Greek drama satirising Athenian society, which was later "mainly known through the works of the Roman dramatists Plautus and Terence, who translated and adapted them, along with other stock plots and characters of Greek New Comedy, for the Roman stage. Revived during the Renaissance, New Comedy influenced European drama down to the 18th century.") Burton borrowed many elements from these Roman comedies: the tendency of characters to burst into song; the character of the clever slave; the love between a high-born man and low-born girl, who is later revealed to be of noble birth. Burton also borrows episodes from contemporary academic satires—dealing with the perennial feuds between town and gown, the distinction between "true" and "false" scholars, the ridicule of pedants—and characters from humanist satirists, chiefly Erasmus and Giovanni Pontano. The play's depiction of alchemy bears some passing resemblance to Ben Jonson's play The Alchemist, but Burton takes strains to point out in the introduction to a manuscript that his play was written before the first staging of Jonson's play, in 1610.

In interpreting the Philosophaster, many authors have understood it solely in relation to the Anatomy, as an academic satire on the excesses of university life, especially that of Oxford. Angus Gowland, describing the University of Osuna as a "thinly disguised Oxford", (Note: The supposed selection of Osuna by Burton as a transparent substitute for Oxford, held by Burtonian scholar Paul Jordan-Smith as well as Gowland, has been challenged by Kathryn Murphy. As she points out, Osuna "is not an imaginary place, and Burton repeatedly reminds his audience exactly where it is: a small town near Seville in Andalusia, where a university had been founded in 1548"; additionally the real Duke of Osuna (Pedro Téllez-Girón) was internationally known and may have even visited the universities of Oxford and Cambridge in 1604, and "dear old Oxford" is otherwise mentioned, and satirised, by name in the play.) asserts that "the purpose of the play was to ridicule contemporary scholarship and provoke reform", in anticipation of the Anatomy's satirical themes. As O'Connell put it more succinctly, the play's "main satiric thrust, that pseudolearned charlatans find a ready haven in a university, is meant to find its general target in Oxford". This much is obvious in certain characters—such as Theanus, an elderly college administrator who has forgotten all his scholarship, but still earns an exorbitant salary tutoring the sons of the gentry—whom the audience were expected to be familiar with within academia. However, critic Kathryn Murphy has pointed out that Philosophaster contains a significant, and often underappreciated, undercurrent of anti-Catholicism. Burton's philosophasters are joined by the representatives of Roman Catholicism, including scholastics and Jesuits, in their mockery of philosophy and the university. Murphy has suggested these themes reflect the pervading cultural influence of the Gunpowder Plot in Burton's lifetime, which took place a year before the play was set.

== Personal life ==
=== Character ===
Known to few, unknown to fewer, here lies Democritus Junior, to whom Melancholy gave both life and death. (Note: The original epitaph is in Latin, and reads: "paucis notus, paucioribus ignotus, hic jacet Democritus Junior cui vitam dedit et mortem melancholia". There is some academic uncertainty as to the meaning of this epitaph: whether it suggests suicide, whether Burton meant here to separate his literary persona (and its separate life and death) from his own, and whether the "Melancholy" referred to is the condition or Burton's Anatomy of Melancholy.)

— Burton's epitaph in Christ Church Cathedral, said to have been composed by himself.

Burton has often been portrayed as something of a recluse, especially by those authors influenced by the Romantic view of Burton. Early 20th-century critic Floyd Dell imagined Burton "hedged within his cloister, his heart yearn[ing] after the romance of adventure". Later biographers have been keen to dispel this image, and emphasise that Burton had a life outside of his books. He was no doubt an active part in the non-academic daily life of Oxford, through his university-appointed roles in its church and market life, and Bamborough adds that in his day he "was known as a mathematician and as both an astrologer and an astronomer, and even had some reputation as a surveyor". Wood also notes that Burton's unsurpassed skill at including "verses from the poets or sentences from classical authors" in his everyday speech, "then all the fashion in the university", allowed him some popularity. However, Burton's "most significant occupations during his life were reading and writing", and his large library is evidence enough of this prodigious bookishness.

Burton's melancholy is the most widely acknowledged feature of his life and character. Wood reported that "he was by many accounted a severe student, a devourer of authors, a melancholy and humorous [i.e., moody] person", yet his peers found his company "very merry". He wrote the Anatomy in part to relieve this melancholy, but this enterprise was not wholly successful. Bishop Kennett, writing somewhat later in the 18th century, recorded that Burton could flit between "interval[s] of vapours", in which he was lively and social, and periods of isolation in his college chambers where his peers worried he was suicidal. Kennett hands down that later in his life Burton could arouse himself from these periods of depression only by "going down to the Bridge-foot in Oxford, and hearing the barge-men scold and storm and swear at one another, at which he would set his hands to his sides, and laugh most profusely."

=== Religious views ===
Gowland has suggested the Burton family had some Catholic sympathies, because of their close relation to Jesuit Arthur Faunt. Faunt's godson and Burton's brother, William, spoke admiringly of Faunt as "a man of great learning, gravity and wisdome"; William was a vigorous supporter of Laudian reforms in his home county, siding with High Church Anglicanism, which was sometimes seen as Catholic-sympathising and at St Thomas's, Burton was apparently one of the last 17th-century Church of England priests to use unleavened wafers in the Communion, an outmoded Laudian practice. However, as an Oxford scholar, Burton could have taken a personal dislike to Archbishop Laud; as the Chancellor there from 1630 to 1641, Laud was in perpetual squabbles with its body of scholars.

Burton was an apparent supporter of James I's anti-Catholic measures, listed among those at Christ Church who took his Oath of Allegiance. The anti-Catholic portions of Philosophaster were revised shortly after James released the Oath, possibly to satirise the ensuing Catholic backlash. (Note: Burton certainly took an interest in these measures, as he purchased several pamphlets dealing with the international debate over the Oath.) As Adam Kitzes put it, Burton "makes no bones about his allegiance to the king and the Church of England". Burton also claimed part of his reasoning in not proceeding to a DD (Doctor of Divinity) was his reluctance to participate in the endless argument surrounding religion, for which he "saw no such great neede".

=== Library ===
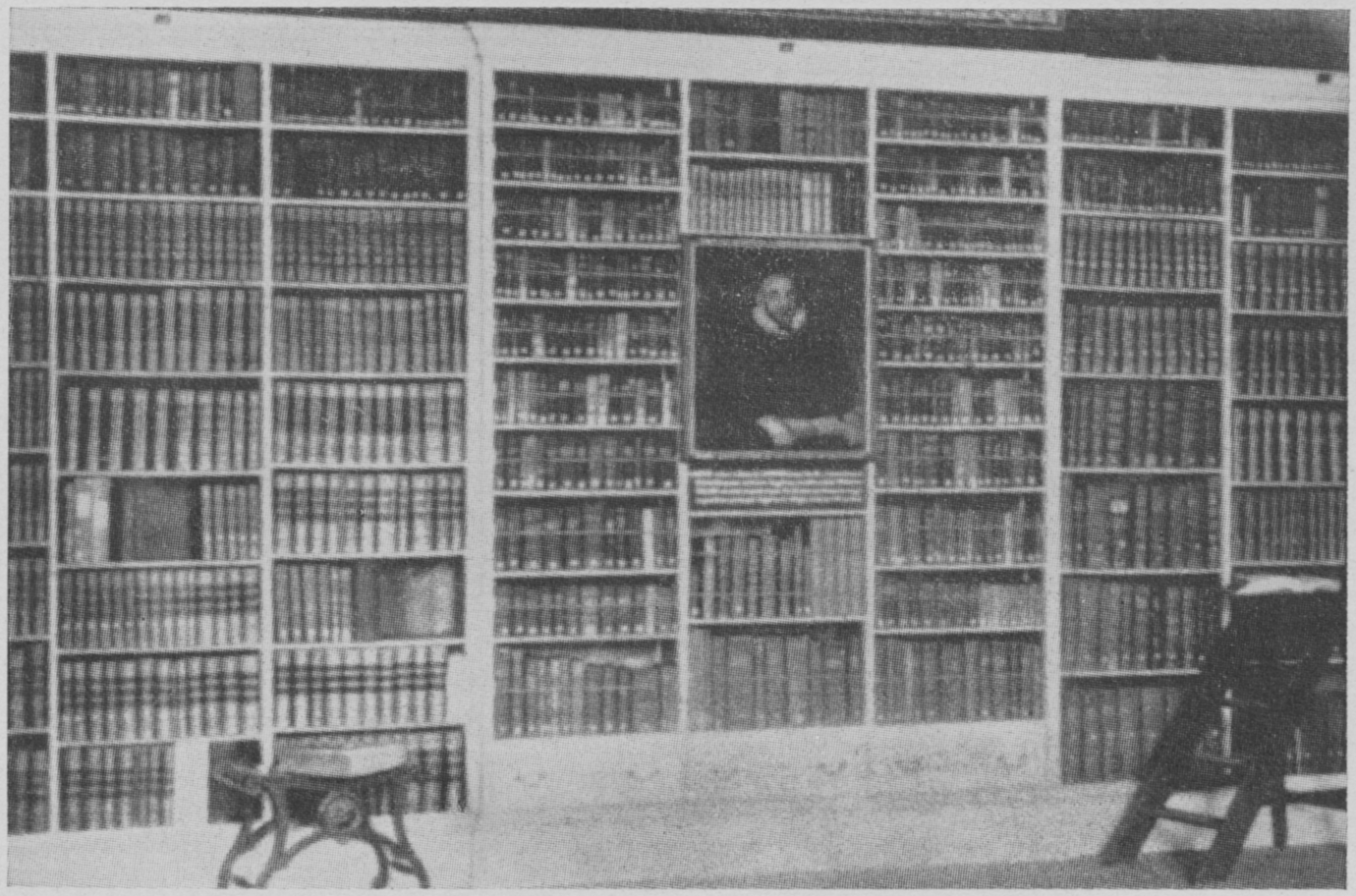
Robert Burton's library in Christ Church Library, 1907, after Osler's efforts to reorganise the bequest.

According to Bamborough, "to describe Burton as 'bookish' can only be called ridiculous understatement". Burton owned 1738 books in total, tenfold the library of a typical Oxford don, though not as vast as those of some other contemporary humanist scholars. (Note: The scholar and occultist John Dee (1527–1608), for instance, held a library totalling over 3000 books and 1000 manuscripts.) He accumulated the collection over a forty-six year period, from 1594 to 1640. The profits from the Anatomy probably funded most of the library, larger than his modest academic and ecclesiastical income would have been able to cover. The majority of the library's contents was in Latin, but the number of English volumes was untypically large. Burton seems to have been uncomfortable reading outside these two primary languages; he owned only a handful of titles in Italian, German, Spanish, and Hebrew, and none in Greek, the last despite his humanist reputation and the recurring Grecian references in the Anatomy. Again despite this reputation, the majority of Burton's library was contemporary. He owned hundreds of cheap pamphlets, satires, and popular plays: all works which had been excluded from the recently founded Bodleian Library, perhaps why Burton felt the need to purchase them. Though religious works composed the largest category in his library (about one quarter), the remaining three quarters were made up by an eclectic collection of literary, historical, medical, and geographical volumes, testifying to Burton's broad scholarship. Burton was an avid annotator of books, with marginal notes in around one-fifth of his books, from the tangential to the bluntly hostile.

Burton's library was divided between the Bodleian and Christ Church libraries after his death. In the early 20th century, Oxford Regius Professor of Medicine William Osler, an enthusiast for Burton, found Burton's bequests "scattered indiscriminately" throughout the two libraries, and, from 1907 to 1908, set about having them gathered together in one collection, rediscovering over a thousand of Burton's volumes. In Christ Church Library, Osler set up an elaborate display of these books surrounding a copy of the Brasenose Portrait of Burton. Osler delivered an address on the contents of Burton's library the following year. In 1964, Christ Church Library disassembled Osler's Burton collection, moving the books to the Archiva Superiora on the second floor. This collection comprises 1530 of the 1738 books and two manuscripts owned by Burton. The remaining 210 were distributed to either various acquaintances of Burton; gifted or traded to other libraries or bookshops; or by selling duplicates, some of which are unrecorded. Of the 140 books yet to be located, it is thought that around half of these are extant. Christ Church Library has referred to Burton's library as "one of the most important surviving English private libraries from the period before the Civil War".

== Reputation and legacy ==
The first, second, and third editions, [Burton] tells us, "were suddenly gone, eagerly read." Five editions appeared in his lifetime and three more within a generation of his death. If one may judge by the frequency of publication, The Anatomy of Melancholy was almost three times as popular as Shakespeare's plays.

— Bergen Evans and George Mohr

Burton's Anatomy was an extremely popular work in Burton's lifetime, and throughout the 17th century, going through eight editions from 1621 to 1676. As early as 1662, Thomas Fuller was awed that "any book of philology in our land hath in so short a time passed so many editions". Its readers interpreted and employed it to varied, personal ends. Wood wrote that the Anatomy, as "a Book so full of variety of reading", prompted hack authors to borrow shamelessly from the work. Some authors, "who have lost their time and are put to a push for invention", poached his numerous classical quotations. In the 18th century, George Steevens retrospectively noted it as "a book once the favourite of the learned and witty, and a source of surreptitious learning". Certainly, scholars copied and emulated the Anatomy to their own ends: William Vaughan repurposed Burton's critique of court patronage towards an anti-Catholic end in The Golden Fleece (1626); Nathanael Carpenter imitated Burton's intimate articulation of his own melancholy and defence of scholarship for his Geography delineated forth (1625); and Richard Whitlock, in his Zootomia (1654), plagiarised Burton's defence of scholarship wholesale in defending the university from contemporary Puritan attacks. For the dramatists such as John Ford, Burton's treatise "was virtually an authoritative psychiatric textbook", used as a reference work for their depictions of melancholy. Richard Holdsworth, when Master of Emmanuel College, Cambridge (1637–43), recommended it as a comprehensive digest to "serve for [the] delight and ornament" of young gentlemen, bestowing that learning expected of a gentleman rather than that of a serious scholar. The earliest biography of Burton appeared in 1662, as part of Fuller's Worthies of England; this was followed by Anthony à Wood in his 1692 volume of Athenae Oxonienses.

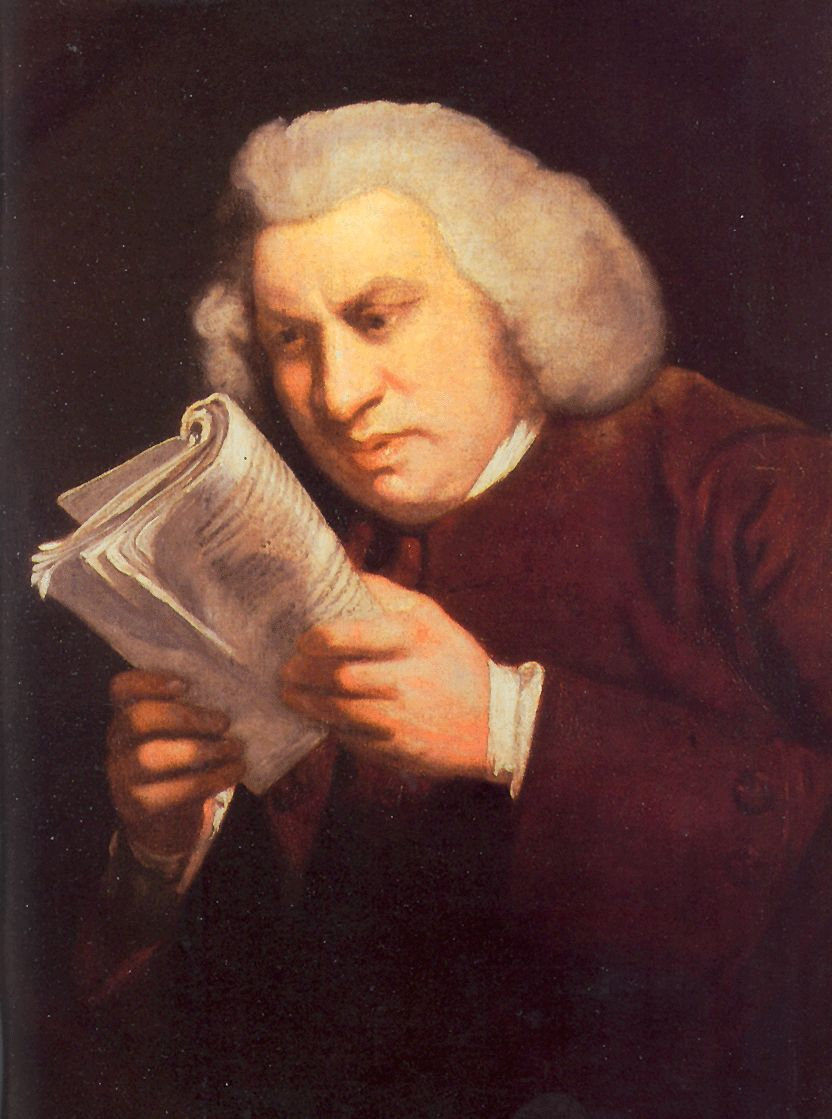
Samuel Johnson was among the few 18th-century readers to recognise Burton's Anatomy.

Into the 18th century, Burton experienced something of a lull in popularity. The Anatomy did still obtain a few distinguished readers in this period. Samuel Johnson, himself a melancholic, was an avid reader of Burton; Boswell's Life of Johnson reports that Johnson remarked the Anatomy was "the only book that ever took him out of bed two hours sooner than he wished to rise". Though no American edition was published until 1836, Burton's work procured a few prominent readers in early America. One such reader was American Founding Father Benjamin Franklin, who marvelled to a friend "that, in the last Century, a Folio, Burton on Melancholy, went through six Editions in about twenty years. We have, I believe, more Readers now, but not such huge Books." Burton's influence during this period was chiefly as reservoir of quotes and anecdotes for less sophisticated authors to borrow from. One such borrower was Laurence Sterne, who shamelessly incorporated passages of Burton throughout his Tristram Shandy (1759), an act of plagiarism which was not revealed for nearly thirty years, until the publication of John Ferriar's Illustrations of Sterne (1798).

After Ferriar made this influence known, Burton and his work experienced a revival of interest. A new edition, the first in over a century, was published in 1800; more than forty were published throughout the 19th century. The Romantics, especially Charles Lamb and Samuel Taylor Coleridge, admired the work as an erudite curiosity. Lamb illustrated Burton in his "Detached Thoughts on Books and Reading" (1833) as "that fantastic great old man", creating the image of Burton as an eccentric and erudite academic which has since stuck, for whatever truth it possessed. The Anatomy was among John Keats's favourite books, and was used as a major source for the plot of his poem "Lamia" (1820). Burton's prose style wasn't universally appreciated, appearing pedantic and pretentious to some 19th-century critics. The Victorian poet and literary critic T. E. Brown disparaged the Anatomy as "the sweepings of the medieval dustbin" or some "enormous labyrinthine joke".

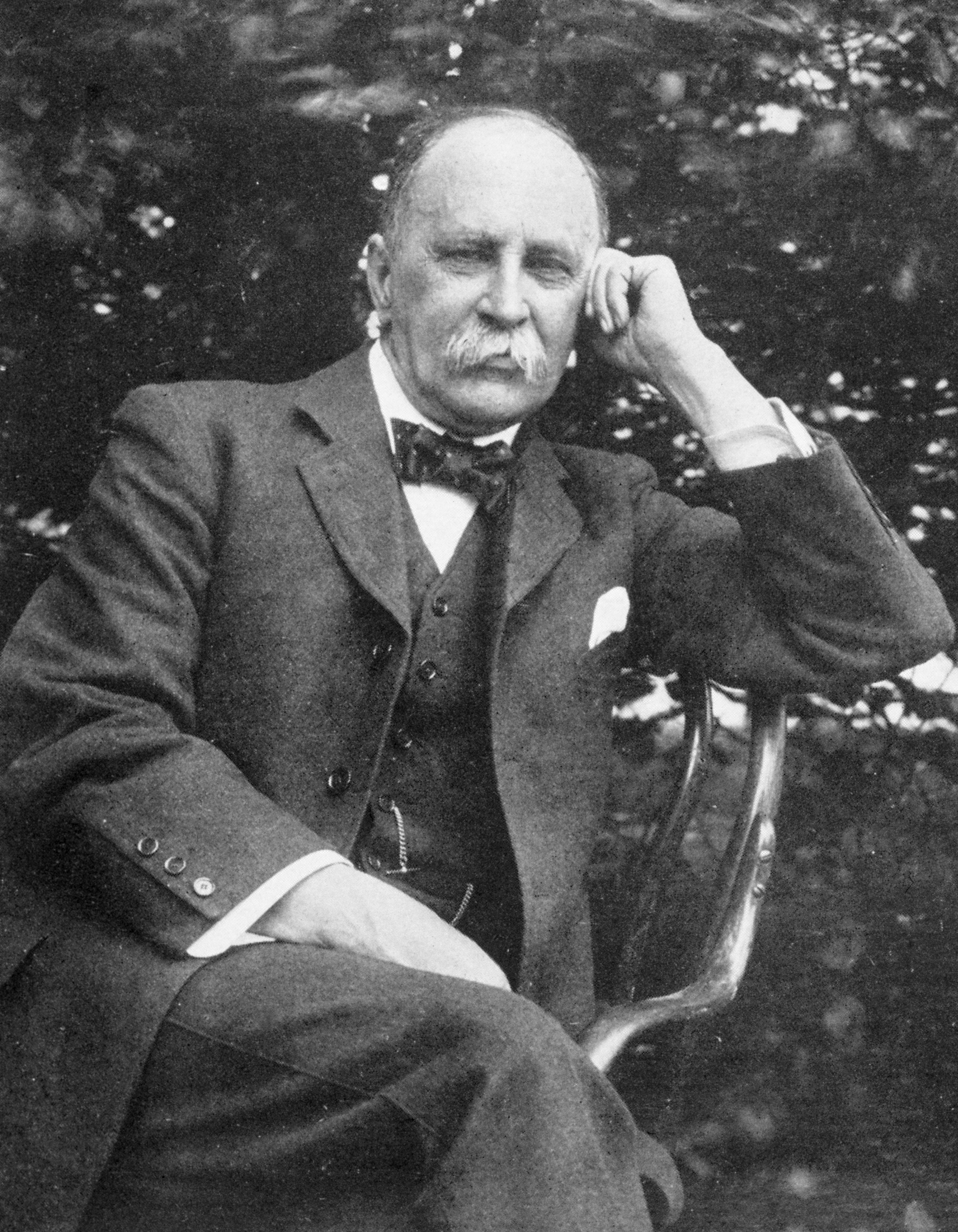
William Osler, the father of modern medicine and a lifelong enthusiast of Burton, whose influence made an important contribution to the revival of interest in the Anatomy in the 20th century.

Into the early 20th century, this romantic view transitioned into the more academic study of Burton's masterpiece. William Osler—widely regarded as the father of modern medicine—was a lifelong devotee of Burton and described the Anatomy as "the greatest medical treatise written by a layman". According to one scholar, "the revival of critical interest in The Anatomy of Melancholy owes not a little to Osler's direct influence". Following Osler's influence, Burtonian studies were primarily bibliographical in the early 20th century, with the exception of an influential essay by critic Morris Croll on the "Senecan style" in Burton's late Renaissance prose. By the middle of the 20th century, psychoanalytic critics of the Anatomy emerged, regarding Burton's masterpiece as a work of psychological autobiography. In The Psychiatry of Robert Burton (1944), for instance, critic Bergen Evans and psychiatrist George Mohr combed the Anatomy for references to mothers in an attempt to reconstruct Burton's own relationship with his mother. This psychoanalytic tendency has been criticised by more modern biographers of Burton, especially by R. L. Nochimson, who dedicated an article to amending the "amazing carelessness" with which Burton's literary and real personae have been confused. Stanley Fish's 1972 monograph Self-Consuming Artifacts inaugurated the postmodern interpretation of Burton's Anatomy, which alternatingly saw it as a satirical indictment of humanistic encyclopedism, or a desperate suppression of Burton's anxiety over the immensity of his subject matter. However, in total, Burton's Anatomy only accrued a small handful of monographs in the second half of the 20th century. The most detailed study of this period was a French monograph by Jean Robert Simon, a fact which, according to one scholar, "speaks volumes about the marginalization of the Anatomy in Anglophone early modern studies [of that period]."

Burton earned a new generation of enthusiasts in the 20th and 21st centuries. As journalist Nick Lezard observed in 2000, though not often reprinted, "Robert Burton's Anatomy of Melancholy survives among the cognoscenti". Samuel Beckett drew influence from Burton's Anatomy, both in the misogynistic depiction of women in his early fiction, and the Latin quotations (via Burton) found throughout in his work. The eminent literary critic Northrop Frye was an admirer of the Anatomy; he characterised it as "an enormous survey of human life" which "ranks with Chaucer and Dickens, except the characters are books rather than people". Psychiatrist and historian of ideas Jacques Barzun held up Burton as "the first systematic psychiatrist", praising him for the collection of "widely scattered case histories" of melancholia for his Anatomy, and treating the mentally ill with a "tender sympathy" uncharacteristic of subsequent psychiatrists. American writer Alexander Theroux has named Burton as one of his influences, and sometimes imitates his style. English novelist Philip Pullman praised the work in a 2005 article for The Telegraph as a "glorious and intoxicating and endlessly refreshing reward for reading". For Pullman, it is "one of the indispensable books; for my money, it is the best of all." Australian singer/songwriter Nick Cave listed Burton's Anatomy as one of his favourite books.

Though Burton's legacy lies almost exclusively in his authorship of the Anatomy, his Philosophaster has increasingly been examined alongside it. As Murphy observed, Philosophaster "has received more attention than most of the other surviving examples of university drama." Since its first, mid-19th-century publication in Latin, it has been published three more times, twice with original translations into English. (Note: The four editions are: Burton, Robert (1862). Buckley, William (ed.). Philosophaster, comoedia: nunc primum in lucem producta (in Latin). Hertford: Roxburghe Club. Burton, Robert (1931). Robert Burton's Philosophaster: with an English translation of the same; together with his other minor writings in prose and verse (in Latin and English). Translated by Jordan-Smith, Paul. Stanford, Calif.: Stanford University Press. Burton, Robert (1984). Spevack, Martin (ed.). Philosophaster (1606) (in Latin). Hildesheim/New York: G. Olms. Burton, Robert (1993). Philosophaster (in Latin and English). Translated by McQuillen, Connie. Binghamton, NY: Center for Medieval and Early Renaissance Studies.) In 1930, it was even performed at the University of California. The play has received a mixed reception from modern scholars. Literary critic Martin Spevack dismissed it as "an obvious and elementary string of transparent sketches". O'Connell has, however, described it as "perhaps the most appealing of Burton's Latin works", he notes that the "liveliness in its representation of university life" redeems the "weak plotting and flat characterization." The 19th-century critic of Elizabethan drama Arthur Henry Bullen wrote of it that the philosophasters "are portrayed with considerable humour and skill, and the lyrical portions of the play are written with a light hand". Bamborough summed it up as "not without genuine merit, particularly in the satirical portraits of pretenders to learning."

== Sources ==
- Barzun, Jacques (2000). From Dawn to Decadence: 500 Years of Western Cultural Life: 1500 to the Present (1st ed.). HarperCollins. ISBN 978-0-06-017586-3. OCLC 316245041.
- Bamborough, J. B. (August 1981). "Robert Burton's Astrological Notebook". The Review of English Studies. New Series. 32 (127): 267–285. doi:10.1093/res/XXXII.127.267. JSTOR 515163.
- Bamborough, J. B. (8 October 2009). "Burton, Robert (1577–1640), writer". Oxford Dictionary of National Biography (online ed.). Oxford University Press. doi:10.1093/ref:odnb/4137. (Subscription, Wikipedia Library access or UK public library membership required.)
- Bamborough, J. B. (2012). "Robert Burton: Christ Church, the Melancholy Librarian and the Birth of a Book" (PDF). Christ Church Library Newsletter. 9: 14–19. ISSN 1756-6800. Archived from the original (PDF) on 22 May 2023.
- Bentley, Christopher (1969). "The Anatomy of Melancholy and Richard Whitlock's Zootomia". Renaissance and Modern Studies. 13 (1): 88–105. doi:10.1080/14735786909391455. PMID 11618020.
- Birch, Delia, ed. (2009). "Anatomy of Melancholy, The". The Oxford Companion to English Literature. Oxford University Press. ISBN 978-0-19-280687-1.
- Bullen, Arthur Henry (1886). "Burton, Robert (1577-1640)" . In Stephen, Leslie (ed.). Dictionary of National Biography. Vol. 8. London: Smith, Elder & Co.
- Burnette, Arianne (23 September 2010). "Jackson, Gilbert (fl. 1621–1643), portrait painter". Oxford Dictionary of National Biography (online ed.). Oxford University Press. doi:10.1093/ref:odnb/68331. (Subscription, Wikipedia Library access or UK public library membership required.)
- Burton, Robert (1927). Dell, Floyd; Jordan-Smith, Paul (eds.). The Anatomy of Melancholy. New York: Tudor Publishing Company. OCLC 713809426.

- Dell, Floyd (1927). "Introduction". In Dell, Floyd; Jordan-Smith, Paul (eds.). The Anatomy of Melancholy. pp. ix–xiv.

- Burton, Robert (1989). Blair, Rhonda L.; Faulkner, Thomas C.; Kiessling, Nicolas K. (eds.). Robert Burton: The Anatomy of Melancholy. Vol. 1. Oxford: Oxford University Press. ISBN 978-0-19-812448-1.

- Blair, Rhonda L.; Faulkner, Thomas C.; Kiessling, Nicolas K. (1989). "Textual Introduction". In Blair, Rhonda L.; Faulkner, Thomas C.; Kiessling, Nicolas K. (eds.). Robert Burton: The Anatomy of Melancholy. Vol. 1. pp. xxxvii–lx.

- Burton, Robert (1993). McQuillen, Connie (ed.). Philosophaster. Medieval & Renaissance Texts & Studies. Vol. 103. Translated by McQuillen, Connie. Albany, New York: State University of New York. ISBN 978-0-86698-123-1. OCLC 185525199.

- McQuillen, Connie (1993). "Introduction". In McQuillen, Connie (ed.). Philosophaster. pp. 1–20.

- Butler, A. J. (1909). "The College Pictures". Brasenose College Quartercentenray Monographs, Vol. 1: General. Oxford Historical Society. Vol. LII. Oxford: Clarendon Press. pp. 1–35. OCLC 1040555119.
- Calabrese, L. H. (May 2005). "Sir William Osler Then and Now: Thoughts for the Osteopathic Profession". J Am Osteopath Assoc. 105 (5): 245–249. PMID 16027478.
- "Burton, Robert (1609–1635)". Clergy of the Church of England database (CCEd).
- "History of the Library". Christ Church.
- Chance, Eleanor; Colvin, Christina; Cooper, Janet; Day, C. J.; Hassall, T. G.; Selwyn, Nesta (1979). "Churches". In Crossley, Alan; Elrington, C.R. (eds.). A History of the County of Oxford, Volume 4: The City of Oxford. Victoria County History (VCH). London: Oxford University Press. pp. 369–412. ISBN 978-0-19-722714-5. OCLC 927026560.
- Cranfield, Nicholas W. S. (24 May 2008). "Bancroft, John (1574–1641), bishop of Oxford". Oxford Dictionary of National Biography (online ed.). Oxford University Press. doi:10.1093/ref:odnb/1270. (Subscription, Wikipedia Library access or UK public library membership required.)
- Denham, Robert D. (2011). "Frye and Robert Burton" (PDF). Essays on Northrop Frye (Online ed.). Emory, Virginia: Iron Mountain Press. pp. 215–227.
- Dewey, Nicholas (22 December 1969). "Sir William Osler and Robert Burton's Anatomy of Melancholy". JAMA. 210 (12): 2245–2250. doi:10.1001/jama.1969.03160380059014. PMID 4902643.
- Dewey, Nicholas (Winter 1970). "'Democritus Junior', alias Robert Burton". The Princeton University Library Chronicle. 31 (2): 103–121. doi:10.2307/26403977. JSTOR 26403977. PMID 11635553.
- Duff, E. G. (1 September 1923). "The Fifth Edition of Burton's Anatomy of Melancholy". The Library. 4th ser. IV (2): 81–101. doi:10.1093/library/s4-iv.2.81.
- Edwards, M. (2010). "Mad world: Robert Burton's The Anatomy of Melancholy". Brain. 133 (11): 3480–3482. doi:10.1093/brain/awq282.
- "New Comedy". Encyclopaedia Britannica.
- Evans, Bergen; Mohr, George J. (1972). The Psychiatry of Robert Burton. New York: Octagon Books. ISBN 978-0-374-92638-0. OCLC 329063.
- Far Out Staff (17 July 2019). "A list of Nick Cave's favourite books and authors". Far Out Magazine.
- Gowland, Angus (2006). The Worlds of Renaissance Melancholy: Robert Burton in Context. Cambridge, UK: Cambridge University Press. ISBN 978-0-521-86768-9. OCLC 723451183.
- Heventhal, Charles Jr. (1969). "Robert Burton's Anatomy of Melancholy in Early America". The Papers of the Bibliographical Society of America. 63 (3): 157–175. doi:10.1086/pbsa.63.3.24301906. JSTOR 24301906. S2CID 163973190.
- Holtgen, Karl Josef (1976). "Robert Burton and the Rectory of Seagrave". The Review of English Studies. 27 (106): 129–136. doi:10.1093/res/xxvii.106.129.
- Kiessling, Nicolas (1988). The Library of Robert Burton. Oxford: Oxford Bibliographical Society. ISBN 9780901420428. OCLC 906631732.
- Kim, Rina (2017). ""Melancholy Matters": Robert Burton and Samuel Beckett". In Marshall, Simon Celine; Cusack, Carole M. (eds.). The Medieval Presence in the Modernist Aesthetic: Unattended Moments. Studies in Religion and the Arts. Vol. 11. Brill. pp. 115–133. doi:10.1163/9789004357020_009. ISBN 978-90-04-35702-0. OCLC 1010747325.
- Kitzes, Adam H. (22 September 2017). "Burton, Robert". In Stewart, A. J. A.; Sullivan, G. (eds.). The Encyclopedia of English Renaissance Literature (online ed.). Wiley-Blackwell. doi:10.1002/9781118297353.wbeerlb043. ISBN 978-1-118-29735-3.
- Lezard, Nick (16 September 2000). "Classics of the future: What is the secret of a book's enduring popularity? Why do great books disappear into obscurity while lesser works survive? According to one critic, the secret boils down to a couple of simple rules. Nick Lezard is not so sure". The Guardian. ISSN 1756-3224.
- Lund, Mary Ann (2010). Melancholy, Medicine and Religion in Early Modern England: Reading The Anatomy of Melancholy. Cambridge, UK: Cambridge University Press. ISBN 978-1-107-65996-4. OCLC 1120781936.
- Milton, Anthony (21 May 2009). "Laud, William (1573–1645), archbishop of Canterbury". Oxford Dictionary of National Biography (online ed.). Oxford University Press. doi:10.1093/ref:odnb/16112. (Subscription, Wikipedia Library access or UK public library membership required.)
- Mueller, W. R. (1949). "Robert Burton's Frontispiece". PMLA. 64 (5): 1074–1088. doi:10.2307/459551. JSTOR 459551.
- Murphy, Kathryn (2009). "Jesuits and Philosophasters: Robert Burton's Response to the Gunpowder Plot". Journal of the Northern Renaissance. 1: 109–128. ISSN 1759-3085. Archived from the original on 26 May 2021.
- Murray, T. Jock (23 April 2012). "Osler and "The Greatest Medical Treatise Written by a Layman"". 42nd Annual Meeting of the American Osler Society (PDF). American Osler Society. p. 40.
- Nardo, Anna K. (1991). "Robert Burton's Play Therapy for a Melancholy Age". The Ludic Self in Seventeenth-Century English Literature. The Margins of Literature. Albany, NY: State University of New York Press. pp. 139–158. ISBN 978-0-7914-0721-9. OCLC 231284901.
- Nicol, W. D. (April 1948). "Robert Burton's Anatomy of Melancholy" (PDF). Postgrad Med J. 24 (270): 199–206. doi:10.1136/pgmj.24.270.199. PMC 2529731. PMID 18914845.
- Nochimson, Richard L. (August 1970). "Robert Burton's Authorship of Alba: A Lost Letter Recovered". The Review of English Studies. 21 (83): 325–331. doi:10.1093/res/XXI.83.325. JSTOR 512742.
- Nochimson, Richard L. (1974). "Studies in the Life of Robert Burton". The Yearbook of English Studies. 4: 85–111. doi:10.2307/3506685. JSTOR 3506685.
- O'Connell, Michael (1986). Robert Burton. Twayne Publishers. ISBN 978-0-8057-6919-7. OCLC 563059617.
- Pullman, Philip (10 April 2005). "Reasons to be cheerful: First published in 1621, The Anatomy of Melancholy remains a humorous and humane stimulant for the soul". The Telegraph. ISSN 0307-1235.
- Scadding, Henry (April 1874). "Leaves They Have Touched". The Canadian Journal. New ser. LXXXV: 73–124, 145–160, 315–347, 479–545, 597–634. ISSN 0381-8624.
- Shirilan, Stephanie (2016). Robert Burton and the Transformative Powers of Melancholy. Literary and Scientific Cultures of Early Modernity. Oxford/New York: Routledge. ISBN 978-1-4724-1701-5. OCLC 1047868647.
- Sununu, Andrea (Spring 1987). "Recent Studies in Burton and Walton". English Literary Renaissance. 17 (2): 243–255. doi:10.1111/j.1475-6757.1987.tb00935.x. JSTOR 43447220. S2CID 145810557.
- Traister, B. H. (1976). "New Evidence about Burton's Melancholy?". Renaissance Quarterly. 29 (1): 66–70. doi:10.2307/2859991. JSTOR 2859991. PMID 11615595. S2CID 33995848.
- White, R. S. (2018). "Review: John Keats in Context / John Keats: Reimagining History". European Romantic Review. 29 (4): 535–540. doi:10.1080/10509585.2018.1487627. S2CID 150320538.
- Wing, John (2012). "Digging for Burton in the Library: An Eminent Archaeologist's First Job" (PDF). Christ Church Library Newsletter. 9: 19–20. ISSN 1756-6800. Archived from the original (PDF) on 22 May 2023.
- Wood, Anthony à (1815). "Robert Burton". In Bliss, Philip (ed.). Athenae Oxonienses. Vol. 2. London. pp. 652–653. OCLC 847943279.
