= Richard Whitlock (writer) =

English vicar, doctor, and writer (1616–1666)

Richard Whitlock (1616–1666) was an English doctor, vicar, and the author of Zootomia.

== Biography ==
Whitlock was born in London to Richard Whitlock and Katherine Burchett and baptised on 17 November 1616 in St. Peter le Poer church. He was the eldest of his father's children. One of his brothers was the controversial presbyterian minister John Whitlock (1624–1708). He matriculated at Magdalen College, Oxford in 1632, aged 16. He took a degree in law at Oxford. He was elected a Fellow of All Souls College in 1638. He also took a degree of medicine, which (since he is not listed as having taken it in Oxford) he probably took at Leyden, where he matriculated in 1643. It seems likely he practised medicine during the Interregnum.

Whitlock's only published work was Zootomia, or. Observations on the Present Manners of the English: Briefly Anatomizing the Living by the Dead. (London, 1654). The book is a collection of essays, as many as fifty, on a great variety of topics. The longest essays are four on medicine, which make up a sixth of the book's length. These essays are scathing attacks on quacks and charlatans from a licensed, and dogmatic, professional doctor in the 17th century. He attacks "Pisse-prophets" and "Mountebanks" in the same breath as he attacks "Empirics", with their reliance on experiment and evidence. Many passages in the book are plagiarised whole-cloth from Robert Burton's Anatomy of Melancholy.

After the Restoration he entered the Church, and was made vicar of Ashford in Kent. He seems to have encountered difficulty with his parishioners here. William Warren, in a 1712 history of the parish of Ashford, recounts that during Whitlock's time at Ashford he scratched remarks (some critical of his parishioners) onto the glass of his parsonage windows:

This Mr. Whitlock was a man of wit & learning: He was a Strenuous Church of England man. I have heard that there were unhappy differences between Him & His Parishioners; and indeed several of those Sentences which he wrote upon the Glass windows in the Parlour of the Vicarage-House do plainly enough intimate as much: There are other sentences that do not much look that way, but seem design’d as good Hints to the Reader to be Retain’d in mind on the common occasions of Life.

Whitlock married one Joan. They had a daughter Elizabeth and a son James (1651–1716), who emigrated to Virginia. Whitlock died in 1666 and was buried at St. Peter le Poer Church on 5 November.
