= George J. Mohr =

American physician

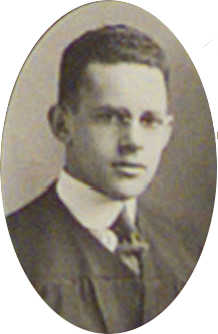
Mohr in the 1918 Graduating Class of Rush Medical College.

Mohr's signature

George Joseph Mohr (28 September 1895 – 6 March 1965) was an American psychologist and psychoanalyst, specializing in pediatric psychiatry.

== Biography ==
Mohr was born in San Francisco on 28 September 1895. As of his death, he had five surviving sisters, one of whom, Esther Raushenbush, became the president of Sarah Lawrence College. He attended the University of Chicago, where he graduated with a BS in 1916. He also graduated from Rush Medical College, receiving his MD in 1918. He was an intern at Cook County Hospital and the Chicago Children's Memorial Hospital. From 1921 to 1925, he was in a private practice in pediatrics in Seattle, following his interest in the discipline. During his time as a pediatrician, Mohr became increasingly interested in the emotional welfare of children, so decided to go into of pediatric psychiatry.

George J. Mohr in the 1916 Senior Class of the University of Chicago.

From 1924 to 1925, Mohr served as the Chief of the Child Hygiene Division of the State Department of Health. From 1925 to 1931, he was at the Institute for Juvenile Research. His tenure there was briefly interrupted for a year, from 1927 to 1928, by his psychoanalytic training at the Institute for Psychoanalysis in Berlin. During his final year at the Institute for Juvenile Research he was Clinical Director. From 1928 to 1931, Mohr was in Pittsburgh, where he served at the Child Guidance Center of Pittsburgh as Director, while also teaching as an associate professor at University of Pittsburgh School of Medicine.

Burton taught in Pittsburgh until 1934, when he went to study at the Psychoanalytic Institute in Vienna, moving to Chicago the same year. In Chicago, Mohr worked as the associate professor of Juvenile Behavior in the Department of Criminology, Social Hygiene and Medical Jurisprudence at the Illinois School of Medicine. After a year in Israel, Mohr moved to Los Angeles in 1937.

Mohr was the 12th President of the American Orthopsychiatric Association, from 1937 to 1938. Dr. Franz Alexander and the Board of Mount Sinai Hospital in Beverly Hills invited Mohr to become their Director of Child Psychiatry. Here, he researched psychosomatic disturbances in children. Mohr was Clinical Professor of Psychology at the University of Southern California.

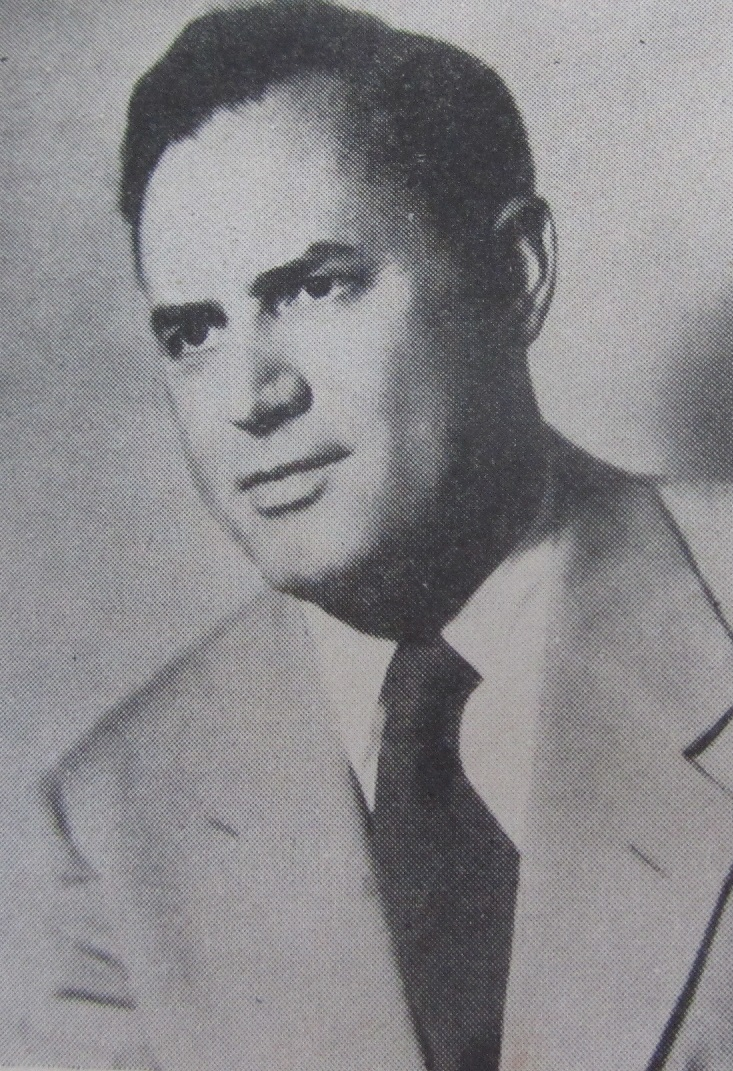
Bergen Evans, who consulted Mohr for his book on the psychology of Robert Burton.

Mohr published several books and many papers on pediatric and psychological topics. His first book was entitled The Physical and Mental Growth of Prematurely Born Children, published in 1934 by the University of Chicago Press. Co-written with prominent neonatologist Julius H. Hess, it studied 1,649 premature infants and 70 congenitally debilitated infants over a period of 12 years, and how they were cared for at Michael Reese Hospital, Chicago. Mohr was consulted by literary critic Bergen Evans for his work on 16th-century writer Robert Burton's psychological treatise, The Anatomy of Melancholy, entitled The Psychiatry of Robert Burton and published by Columbia University Press in 1944. He collaborated with Marian A. Despres in writing The Stormy Decade, which was published by Random House in 1958, and examined the emotional and social development of teenagers. He also co-wrote several papers dealing with possible psychogenic factors in asthma among young children.

== Personal life ==
Mohr married Esther Jaffe in 1922, and by 1939 had two children, a son David and a daughter Judith (later Judith Ann). In a 1939 article for the American Journal of Orthopsychiatry, he described his hobbies as "music and traveling"; the highlights of his life as "conduct[ing] a dance orchestra in [his] high school and college days", most remarkably in a production of "farthest north" in 1922; and his aims in life as "always [getting] more for the little Mohrs." Mohr enjoyed music and played the violin.

On 6 March 1965, aged 69, Mohr died at the Columbia Presbyterian Medical Center in New York following a heart attack. He had been in New York for research at the Medical Center when he died. Several years before this point, he had become ill, but reportedly neglected his own health for his work. He was survived by his wife, two children, and five sisters.

== Works ==
- (w/ Julius H. Hess) The Physical and Mental Growth of Prematurely Born Children (1934, University of Chicago Press)
- (consultant for Bergen Evans) The Psychiatry of Robert Burton (1944, Columbia University Press)
- When Children Face Crises (1952, Science Research Associates)
- (w/ Marian A. Despres) The Stormy Decade: Adolescence (1958, Random House)
