= Philosophaster =

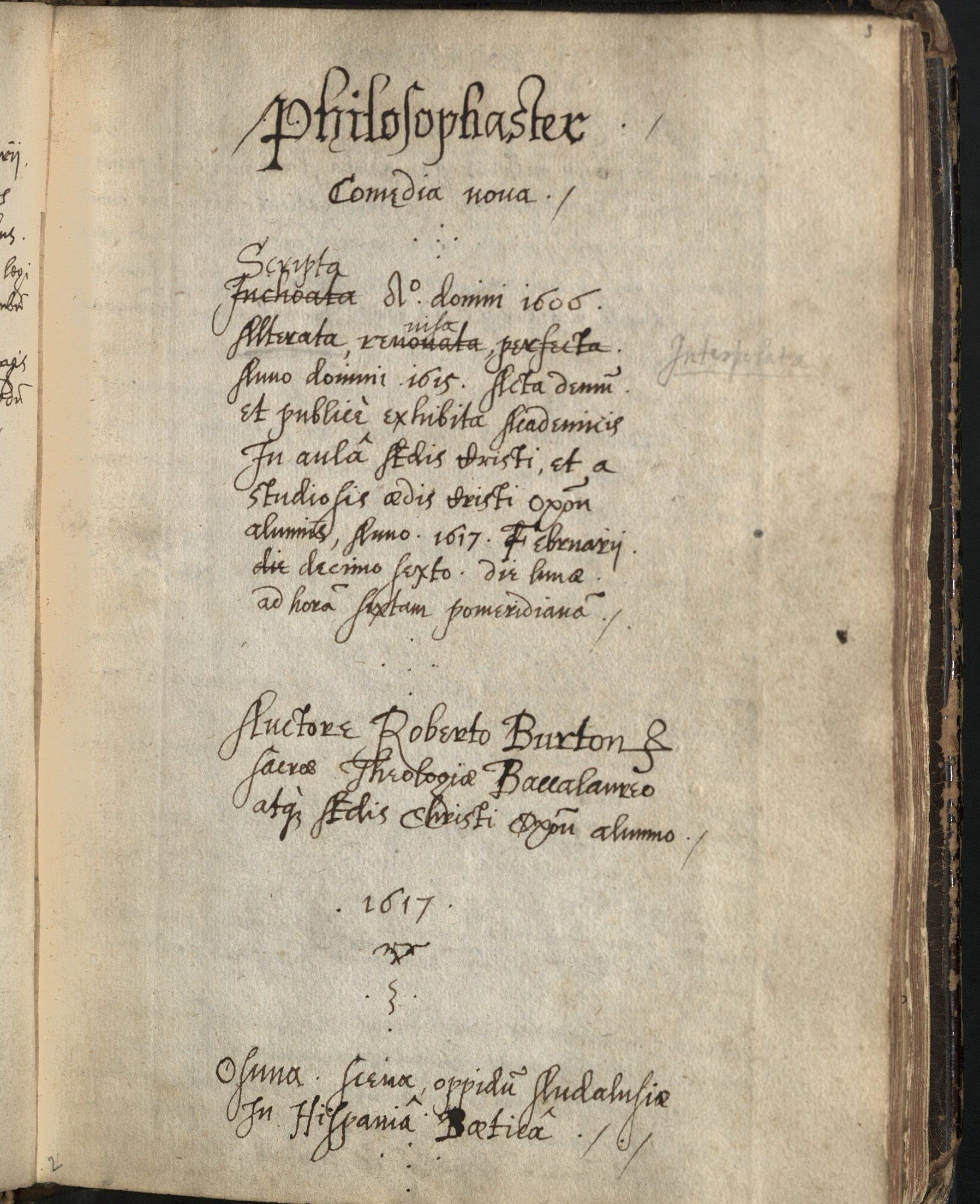
Title page of the manuscript of Philosophaster.

Philosophaster is a Latin satirical comedy by Robert Burton. He began writing the play in 1606 and completed it by 1615. It was performed by students in the Hall of Christ Church, Oxford on 16 February 1618 (New Style). The play was not published in Burton's lifetime, and it remained in manuscript till 1862 when it was edited by William Edward Buckley and published by the Roxburghe Club. It was first translated into English by Paul Jordan-Smith and published by Stanford University Press, California in 1931.

Since the play is about someone who pretends to be a philosopher, the term itself has been used in more recent times to refer to a pretender to philosophy.

The original manuscript as well as sides used by the actors in the 1618 production are at the Harvard Theatre Collection, Houghton Library, Harvard University.

== Plot ==
A university is established by the Duke of Osuna in the small town of Osuna in Andalusia, Spain. The university is well-endowed, and it offers salaries and other incentives for students and academics all over Europe. Unfortunately, as well as honest and reputable people, the new university also attracts 'philosophasters' or sham philosophers. These include confidence tricksters, fraudsters and others who are more interested in making money than in contributing to academic life. The play is about the havoc caused by these people and by prostitutes attracted to the town. The townspeople are outraged, and The Duke is inclined to close the university down. However, two scholars persuade him not to do so. Instead, he summons both the villains and the victims before a Tribunal. All the wrongs are righted, and the villains are punished. The two scholars are put in charge of the University which is established on a better footing. The play ends with everyone singing a hymn in praise of philosophy.

== Characters ==
=== Philosophasters ===
The philosophasters in the play include:

- Polupragmaticus – a Jesuit priest who defrauded noblemen in the guise of a teacher, politician, courtier, theologian, or magician.
- Pantomagus – an alchemist and physician who plied fake medicines. He also deceived a nobleman into believing that he could produce mountains of gold through the practice of alchemy. He would disappear when he had bankrupted a household.
- Pedanus – a teacher of grammar who obtained by deception two livings or ecclesiastical posts and was plotting to become the Duke's chaplain.
- Amphimacer – a poetaster or sham poet who composed certain silly poems for his mistress and anyone else.
- Theanus – a theologaster or sham theologian who was lazy and idle.

== Background ==
The background to the play is the Gunpowder Plot of 1605. The play was written shortly after this Catholic plot to blow up King and Parliament, and it reflects the anti-catholic feeling of the time. Burton, in fact, refers to a real Duke of Osuna who set up a university in Osuna in 1548. He chose this university because Andalusian universities were very religious, pro-Catholic and peddled the worst kind of scholasticism. He is also attacking the Jesuits, who were very active in his time, and the play portrays them as anti-social villains: "The typical Jesuit is 'a notorious Bawd, & famous Fornicator, lascivum pecus, a very goat' (AM 1.40), and the Jesuits play many 'pranks'".
