= Jane Tompkins =

American literary scholar (born 1940)

- Born: Jane Tompkins; January 18, 1940 (age 86); New York City, U.S.
- Education: Newton North High School; Bryn Mawr College (BA); Yale University (MA, PhD)
- Spouse: Stanley Fish (since 1982)
- Writing career
- Subject: Literary criticism
- Notable works: Sensational Designs: The Cultural Work of American Fiction, 1790-1860 (1985)
- Movement: New Historicism

Jane Tompkins (born January 18, 1940) is an American literary scholar who has worked on canon formation, feminist literary criticism, and reader response criticism. She has also coined and developed the notion of cultural work in literary studies and contributed to the new historicist form of literary criticism that emerged in the 1980s. She earned her PhD at Yale in 1966 and subsequently taught at Temple University, Duke University, and the University of Illinois at Chicago. She is married to cultural critic Stanley Fish.

== Cultural work ==
Tompkins developed her idea of texts doing cultural work in her 1985 book Sensational Designs: The Cultural Work of American Fiction, 1790-1860. She argues that texts (e.g. novels) do "a certain kind of cultural work within a specific historical situation." To her, "plots and characters" provide "society with a means of thinking about itself, defining certain aspects of a social reality which the authors and their readers shared, dramatizing its conflicts, and recommending solutions. It is the notion of literary texts as doing work, expressing and shaping the social context that produced them, that I wish to substitute finally for the critical perspective that sees them as attempts to achieve a timeless, universal ideal of truth and formal coherence."

== Books ==
- Sensational Designs: The Cultural Work of American Fiction, 1790-1860. Oxford: Oxford University Press, 1985.
- West of Everything: The Inner Life of Westerns. Oxford: Oxford University Press, 1993.
- A Life In School: What The Teacher Learned. New York: Perseus Books, 1996.
- Reading Through The Night. University of Virginia Press, 2018.
