= Bergen Evans =

American television host (1904–1978)

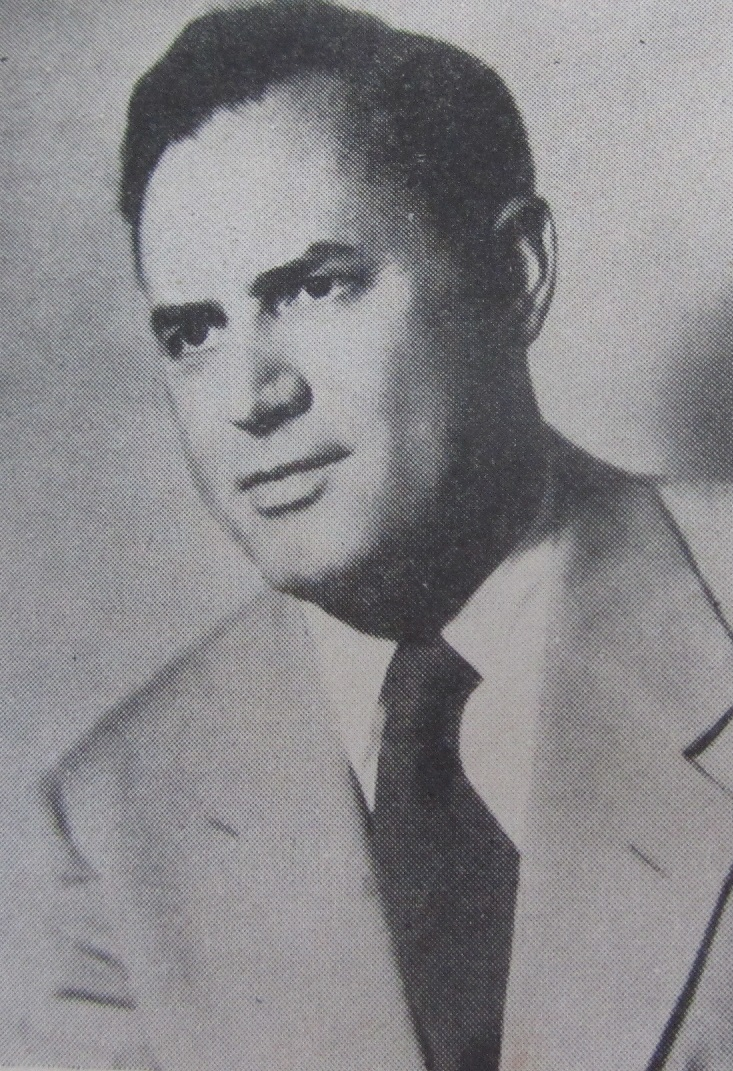
Bergen Evans in 1954

Bergen Baldwin Evans (September 19, 1904 – February 4, 1978) was a Northwestern University professor of English and a television host. He received a George Foster Peabody Award in 1957 for excellence in broadcasting for his CBS TV series The Last Word.

== Life and career ==
Bergen Evans was born in Franklin, Ohio, the son of Rice Kemper Evans, a doctor, and Louise Cass Evans. He received a bachelor of arts degree in 1924 from Miami University. He received his master's degree (1925) and doctorate (1932) from Harvard University, and was a Rhodes Scholar at University College, Oxford, in 1930. He was married to Jean Whinery on August 5, 1939.

Evans began his teaching career as an instructor of English at Northwestern University in September 1932, and he remained there until his retirement in 1974. An author of short stories, he also was a feature writer for The American Mercury (1947–1950) and wrote a column called "The Skeptics Corner".

Evans became known as the question supervisor, or "authority", for the television series $64,000 Question. His books include Word-A-Day Vocabulary Builder (1963), and the annotated Dictionary of Quotations (1968).

In the first half of the 1953–1954 television season, Evans hosted the ABC panel discussion series Of Many Things, which items of interest to the public. Mitch Miller, the band leader, was among his guests. Bergen also hosted the DuMont version of Down You Go (1951–1955).

Evans's A Dictionary of Contemporary American Usage (1957), cowritten with his sister Cornelia, produced an apparent spin-off: the television show The Last Word, which he hosted Sundays on CBS, from 1957 to 1959.

Viewers were encouraged to send in questions that pertain to spelling, punctuation, usage and pronunciation. These questions were put to a panel of experts from various professional fields. Sound recordings of broadcasts for May 18 and May 25, 1957, are archived with the Library of Congress.

In The New Yorker, Phyllis McGinley wrote, "I'd take more pleasure in discussions schola'ly / If Bergen Evans wouldn't laugh so jollily."

A July 1958 essay by Evans for the New York Times Magazine, in which he denounced the use of clichés, prompted an amiable rejoinder a month later by writer and naturalist Joseph Wood Krutch, who defended their use.

Evans received a George Foster Peabody Award in 1957 for excellence in broadcasting for The Last Word. The Peabody citation reads, "It is entertainment and public service—made so by the wit, charm, and erudition of Bergen Evans, John Mason Brown, and their distinguished guest panelists. This sparkling weekly discussion of words, the basis of all understanding and progress, makes it clear that learning can be fun, and that educational programs do not have to be dull."

Evans died February 4, 1978, in Highland Park, Illinois.

== Skepticism ==
A proponent of skepticism, Evans penned two works in the field, The Natural History of Nonsense (1946) and The Spoor of Spooks and Other Nonsense (1954). The latter book contained a chapter criticizing parapsychology and the experiments of J. B. Rhine. Science writer Martin Gardner gave the book a positive review describing it as a "hilarious blast at human gullibility ... a witty compendium of mistaken beliefs, scientific and otherwise."

== Published works ==
- Comfortable Words. Illustrated by Tomi Ungerer (New York: Random House, 1962) 379 p. illus. 24 cm.
- A Dictionary of Contemporary American Usage, by Bergen Evans and Cornelia Evans (New York: Random House, 1957) viii, 567 p. 26 cm.
- Dictionary of Mythology, Mainly Classical (Lincoln, Neb.: Centennial Press, 1970) xviii, 293 p. illus. 22 cm.
- Dictionary of Quotations, collected and arranged and with comments by Bergen Evans (New York: Delacorte Press, 1968) lxxxix, 2029 p. 24 cm.
- Fifty Essays, edited by Bergen Evans (Boston: Little, Brown, 1936) xii, 363 p. 19½ cm.
- The Life of Samuel Johnson; Boswell, James, 1740–1795 abridged, with an introduction by Bergen Evans (New York, Modern Library, 1952) xv, [1], 559 p. 19 cm.
- The Making of English. Bradley, Henry, 1845–1923. With an introd. by Bergen Evans, and additional material and notes by Bergen Evans and Simeon Potter (New York: Walker, 1967) vii, 209 p. 21 cm.
- The Natural History of Nonsense, by Bergen Evans (New York: A. A. Knopf, 1946) ix, 275, x p., 1 leaf. 22 cm.
- The Psychiatry of Robert Burton, by Bergen Evans, in consultation with George J. Mohr, M.D. (New York: Columbia University Press, 1944) ix p., 1 leaf, 129 p. frontispiece (portrait, facsimile) 23 cm.
- The Spoor of Spooks, and Other Nonsense. (New York: A. A. Knopf, 1954) 295 p. 22 cm.
- The Word-A-Day Vocabulary Builder (New York: Random House, 1963) viii, 216 p. 24 cm.
- Your Car is Made to Last, by Herman Bishop and Bergen Evans (New York: Putnam, 1942) xi, 186 p. 20 cm.
