= The Last Word (American TV series) =

- Created by: Hubbell Robinson
- Written by: Stephen Sondheim; Madeline Karr
- Directed by: LaMar Casselli
- Presented by: Bergen Evans
- Country of origin: United States

Production
- Producers: Fred Freed; Bill Weinstein

Original release
- Network: CBS
- Release: January 6, 1957 – October 18, 1959

The Last Word is an American television talk show about the English language that was broadcast on CBS. It debuted on January 6, 1957, and ended on October 18, 1959. As the series neared its end, The New York Times said, "Despite its susceptibility to periodic cancellations, the program has become an authority on good English usage." Audio of episodes was broadcast on CBS Radio. The program won a Peabody Award in 1957.

== Format ==
An idea of CBS executive Hubbell Robinson Jr. led to his having a discussion with Bergen Evans, which in turn led to the creation of The Last Word. Evans said that Robinson wanted the network to have a program about the English language. As the two of them discussed the topic, they "had a violent argument about what's correct: 'It is I' or 'It is me.'" The program came into existence as a result of that meeting.

Evans, as host of the show, discussed topics of English grammar and usage with a panel of celebrities and authorities that had John Mason Brown as a permanent member. Otherwise, the panel's composition varied from week to week. Guest panelists included Ilka Chase, John Crosby, Emily Kimbrough, Frank Baxter, Cecil B. DeMille, Greer Garson, Aldous Huxley, Clifton Fadiman, James Michener, Ogden Nash, S. J. Perelman, Katherine Anne Porter, and Sam Levenson. Topics of discussion included pronunciation, jargon, and puns.

Discussions were based on questions that viewers submitted, sometimes as many as 8,000 per week. Viewers whose letters were read on the program received an encyclopedia. Two submissions came from an American president and a governor.

In May 1957 W. Averell Harriman, governor of New York, contacted Evans, asking for an opinion regarding wording on state tax forms. Harriman wrote, in part, "As we are about to print 20,000,000 new income tax forms I would be most interested to know if you do not think we are right in changing 'different than' to 'different from'." The decision on the program supported use of "different from", and Harriman won a set of Encyclopædia Britannica for the submission.

The White House contacted the show in 1958 after "offended purists protested" President Dwight Eisenhower's use of "finalized" in a speech. The panel said the usage was deplorable, but Evans felt that it was acceptable in certain situations.

== Production ==
Fred Freed and Bill Weinstein were the producers, and LaMar Casselli was the director. Stephen Sondheim and Madeline Karr were the writers.

The program was broadcast from 6 to 6:30 p.m. on Sundays. Because it had no sponsor, CBS affiliates in some cities (including Chicago, Cleveland, Columbus, Dallas, and Denver) broadcast locally sponsored programs in place of it.

== Recognition ==
The Last Word won a Peabody Award in 1957. The Peabody Awards website contains the comment:

A program concerned with words, their meaning, and their use is educational. It is also literary. In the case of The Last Word, it is entertainment and public service—made so by the wit, charm, and erudition of Bergen Evans, John Mason Brown, and their distinguished guest panelists. This sparkling weekly discussion of words, the basis of all understanding and progress, makes it clear that learning can be fun, and that educational programs do not have to be dull. The Last Word has, therefore, rendered the kind of meritorious public service for which the Peabody Awards came into being—and richly deserves the recognition.

== Critical response ==
A review of the first two episodes in the trade publication Variety said the program looked like a success for the new year for CBS. It described the show's discussions of the English language as "bright and witty with an appeal that reaches beyond the egghead school."

A review in The New York Times described The Last Word as "consistently entertaining as well as informative" and added, "The exchanges often are witty and provocative." In addition to its entertainment value, the review said that the show "has been constructive and enlightening in exploring some fine points of usage."

The trade publication Broadcasting, in a brief review, said that the return of The Last Word to the air in January 1958 was "very welcome", and it described the panel as "informed and witty".

== Book ==
In 1962 Random House published Evans's book Comfortable Words, which resulted from his experiences on The Last Word. Evans said that "astonishing queries" arose during the program's time on TV. He added, "Two things of general interest emerged, the violence of the intolerance felt for any variation from whatever the writers felt to be 'correct', and . . . the extraordinary insecurity that Americans feel about the use of their language."
