= John Mason Brown =

American drama critic and author

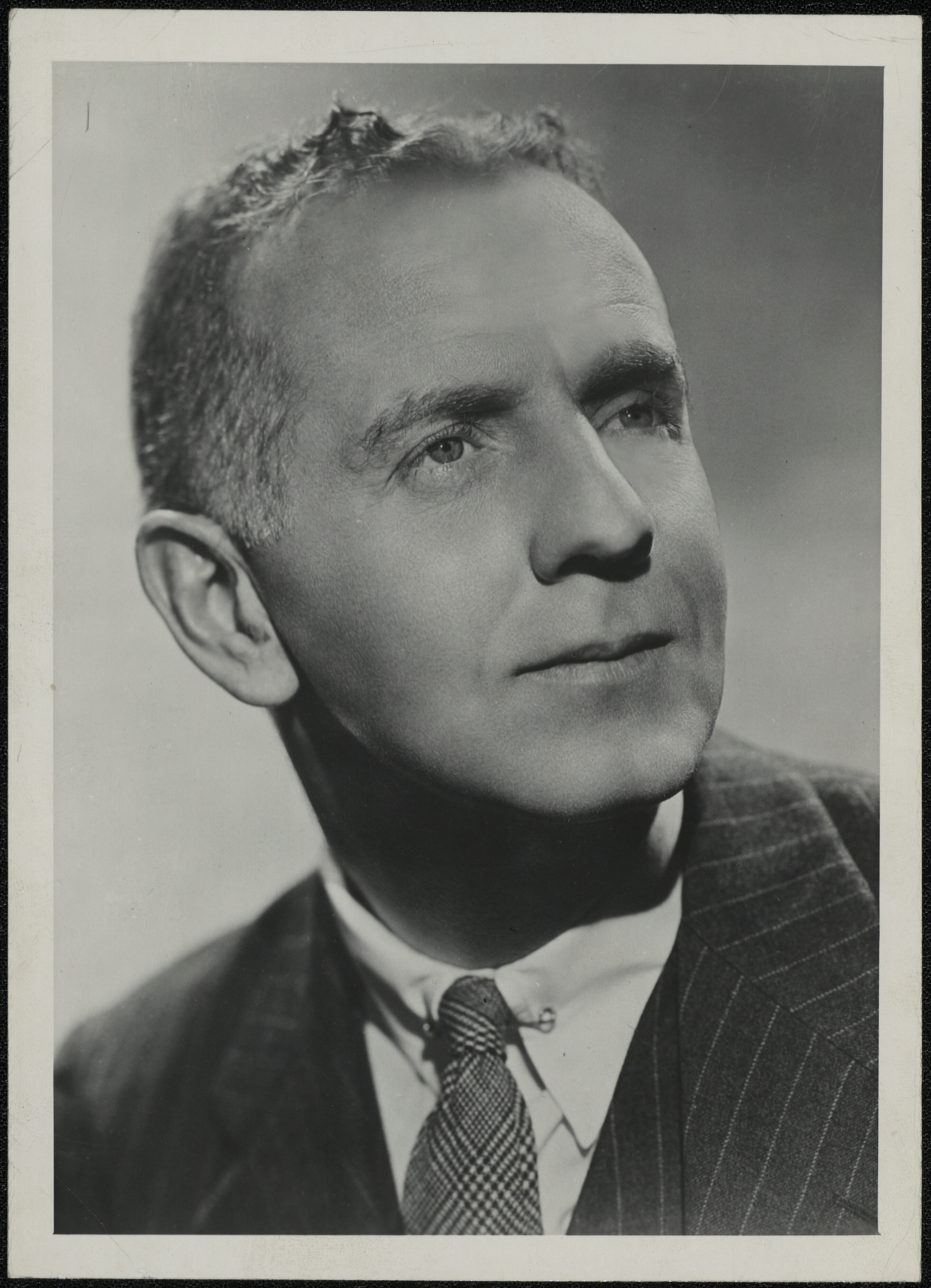
- Born: July 3, 1900; Louisville, Kentucky, U.S.
- Died: March 16, 1969 (aged 68); New York, New York, U.S.
- Education: Harvard University
- Occupations: Columnist, journalist
- Writing career
- Genre: Drama criticism
- Notable work: "Seeing Things" column

John Mason Brown (July 3, 1900 – March 16, 1969) was an American drama critic and author.

== Life ==
Born in Louisville, Kentucky, he graduated from Harvard College in 1923. In 1925, Brown became a theatre critic for Theatre Arts magazine. He then worked for the New York Evening Post from 1929 to 1941 and briefly (1941) for the World-Telegram. He served as a lieutenant in the United States Navy during World War II, beginning in 1942. His book, To All Hands, documents his activities aboard the USS Ancon (AGC-4) during Operation Husky, the invasion of Sicily.

Upon his return, his "Seeing Things" column appeared in The Saturday Review starting in 1944 until his death. In a 1948 radio broadcast, Brown attacked comic books as "the marijuana of the nursery; the bane of the bassinet; the horror of the house; the curse of the kids; and a threat to the future." (These charges were echoed during this period by other public figures like Sterling North, J. Edgar Hoover, and most notably Dr. Fredric Wertham, until Congressional hearings led to the mid-1950s self-censorship and rapid shrinkage of the comics industry.) Brown, who described some of the current television shows being aired as, "chewing gum for the eyes", moderated a more intellectual discussion show titled Critic at Large. The series ran on ABC from 1948 to 1949. Brown was also a permanent panelist on the CBS television show The Last Word, which won a Peabody Award in 1957.

Brown resigned from the Pulitzer Prize drama jury in 1963 when the advisory board rejected his recommendation, and that of theater historian John Gassner, that the prize go to Edward Albee's Who's Afraid of Virginia Woolf?.

He died in New York City. He was inducted, posthumously, into the American Theatre Hall of Fame in 1981.

== See also ==
- 45th Regiment Kentucky Volunteer Mounted Infantry, the regiment Brown's grandfather commanded during the American Civil War
