= Stanley Fish =

American literary theorist, legal scholar, author and public intellectual (born 1938)

Stanley Eugene Fish
- Born: April 19, 1938 (age 88); Providence, Rhode Island
- Occupations: Literary theorist; legal scholar; author; professor
- Spouse: Jane Tompkins

Academic background
- Education: University of Pennsylvania (BA); Yale University (MA, PhD)

Stanley Eugene Fish (born April 19, 1938) is an American literary theorist, legal scholar, author and public intellectual. He is the Floersheimer Distinguished Visiting Professor of Law at Yeshiva University's Benjamin N. Cardozo School of Law in New York City. Fish has previously served as the Davidson-Kahn Distinguished University Professor of Humanities and a professor of law at Florida International University and is dean emeritus of the College of Liberal Arts and Sciences at the University of Illinois at Chicago.

Fish is associated with postmodernism, although he views himself instead as an advocate of anti-foundationalism. He is also viewed as having influenced the rise and development of reader-response theory.

Fish has also taught at the Cardozo School of Law, University of California, Berkeley, Johns Hopkins University, The University of Pennsylvania, Yale Law School, Columbia University, The John Marshall Law School, and Duke University.

== Early life and education ==
Fish was born in Providence, Rhode Island. He was raised Jewish. His father, an immigrant from Poland, was a plumber and contractor who made it a priority for his son to get a university education. Fish became the first member of his family to attend college in the US, earning a B.A. from the University of Pennsylvania in 1959 and an M.A. from Yale University in 1960. He completed his PhD in 1962, also at Yale University.

== Academic career ==
Fish taught English at the University of California at Berkeley and Johns Hopkins University before serving as Arts and Sciences Professor of English and professor of law at Duke University from 1986 to 1998. From 1999 to 2004, he was dean of the College of Liberal Arts and Sciences at the University of Illinois at Chicago, and he served as distinguished visiting professor at the John Marshall Law School from 2000 until 2002. Fish also held joint appointments in the Departments of Political Science and Criminal Justice and was the chairman of the Religious Studies Committee.

During his tenure there, he recruited professors respected in the academic community, and attracted attention to the college. After resigning as dean in a high-level dispute with the state of Illinois over funding UIC, Fish spent a year teaching in the Department of English. The Institute for the Humanities at UIC named a lecture series in his honor, which is still ongoing. In June 2005, he accepted the position of Davidson-Kahn Distinguished University Professor of Humanities and Law at Florida International University, teaching in the FIU College of Law.

In November 2010 he joined the board of visitors of Ralston College, a start-up institution in Savannah, Georgia. He has also been a Fellow of the American Academy of Arts and Sciences since 1985.

In April 2024, New College of Florida described him as presidential scholar in residence in invitations to a discussion with Mark Bauerlein on free speech, academic freedom, and political expression.

== Milton ==
Fish started his career as a medievalist. His first book, published by Yale University Press in 1965, was on the late-medieval/early-Renaissance poet John Skelton. Fish explains in his partly biographical essay, "Milton, Thou Shouldst be Living at this Hour" (published in There's No Such Thing as Free Speech . . . And It's a Good Thing, Too), that he came to Milton by accident. In 1963, the year Fish started as an assistant professor at the University of California, Berkeley, its resident Miltonist, Constantinos Patrides, received a grant. The chair of the department asked Fish to teach the Milton course, notwithstanding that Fish "had never—either as an undergraduate or in graduate school—taken a Milton course" (269). The eventual result was Surprised by Sin: The Reader in Paradise Lost (1967; rpt. 1997). Fish's 2001 book How Milton Works reflects five decades of his scholarship on Milton. Academic and critic John Mullan disagrees with Fish's interpretation:

His book needs to presume that we find Milton's beliefs, and even more the sheer force of those beliefs, inimical. It never occurs to Fish that the ever-abused "reader" might share any values with Milton… Even when he has a point, Fish is wrestling Milton to his cause. There is no room to consider that Milton's poetry might be wise about human weakness, and that Paradise Lost, for instance, might be more notable for its sense of tragedy than for its doctrinal correctness.

== Interpretive communities ==
Fish is best known for his analysis of interpretive communities — an offshoot of reader-response criticism. His work in this field examines how the interpretation of a text is dependent upon each reader's own subjective experience in one or more communities, each of which is defined as a 'community' by a distinct epistemology. For Fish, a large part of what renders a reader's subjective experience valuable – that is, why it may be considered "constrained" as opposed to an uncontrolled and idiosyncratic assertion of the self – comes from a concept native to the field of linguistics called linguistic competence.

In Fish's source the term is explained as "the idea that it is possible to characterize a linguistic system that every speaker shares." In the context of literary criticism, he uses this concept to argue that a reader's approach to a text is not completely subjective, and that an internalized understanding of language shared by the native speakers of that given language makes possible the creation of normative boundaries for one's experience with language.

== Fish and university politics ==
Fish has written extensively on the politics of the university, having taken positions supporting campus speech codes and criticizing political statements by universities or faculty bodies on matters outside their professional areas of expertise.

After the founding of the Duke chapter of the National Association of Scholars in 1990, Fish wrote to the university provost, suggesting that NAS members be excluded from committees making tenure and curriculum decisions. His request sparked controversy at Duke and among U.S. academics, and was ultimately denied.

Fish argued in January 2008 on his New York Times-syndicated blog that the humanities are of no instrumental value, but have only intrinsic worth. He explains, "To the question 'of what use are the humanities?', the only honest answer is none whatsoever. And it is an answer that brings honor to its subject. Justification, after all, confers value on an activity from a perspective outside its performance. An activity that cannot be justified is an activity that refuses to regard itself as instrumental to some larger good. The humanities are their own good. There is nothing more to say, and anything that is said diminishes the object of its supposed praise."

Fish has lectured across the US at many universities and colleges including Florida Atlantic University, Brown University, Baylor University, the University of Pennsylvania, Harvard University, University of Toronto, Columbia University, the University of Vermont, the University of Georgia, the University of Louisville, San Diego State University, the University of Kentucky, Bates College, the University of Central Florida, the University of West Florida, and the Benjamin N. Cardozo School of Law.

== Fish as university politician ==
As chair of the Duke English department from 1986 to 1992, Fish attracted attention and controversy. Fish, according to Lingua Franca, used "shameless—and in academe unheard-of—entrepreneurial gusto" to take "a respectable but staid Southern English department and transform it into the professional powerhouse of the day", in part through the payment of lavish salaries. His time at Duke saw comparatively quite light undergraduate and graduate coursework requirements for students, matched by their heavy graduate teaching requirements. This permitted professors to reduce their own teaching. In April 1992, near the end of Fish's time as department chair, an external review committee considered evidence that the English curriculum had become "a hodgepodge of uncoordinated offerings", lacking in "broad foundational courses" or faculty planning. The department's dissipating prominence in the 1990s was featured on the front page of The New York Times.

== Criticisms of his work ==
As a frequent contributor to The New York Times and The Wall Street Journal editorial page, Fish has been the target of wide-ranging criticism.

Writing in Slate magazine, Judith Shulevitz reported that not only does Fish openly proclaim himself "unprincipled" but also rejects wholesale the concepts of "fairness, impartiality, reasonableness." To Fish, "ideas have no consequences." For taking this stance, Shulevitz characterizes Fish as "not the unprincipled relativist he's accused of being. He's something worse. He's a fatalist."

Likewise, among academics, Fish has endured vigorous criticism. The conservative R. V. Young writes,

Because his general understanding of human nature and of the human condition is false, Fish fails in the specific task of a university scholar, which requires that learning be placed in the service of truth. And this, finally, is the critical issue in the contemporary university of which Stanley Fish is a typical representative: sophistry renders truth itself equivocal and deprives scholarly learning of its reason for being... . His brash disdain of principle and his embrace of sophistry reveal the hollowness hidden at the heart of the current academic enterprise.

Terry Eagleton, a prominent British Marxist, excoriates Fish's "discreditable epistemology" as "sinister". According to Eagleton, "Like almost all diatribes against universalism, Fish's critique of universalism has its own rigid universals: the priority at all times and places of sectoral interests, the permanence of conflict, the a priori status of belief systems, the rhetorical character of truth, the fact that all apparent openness is secretly closure, and the like." Of Fish's attempt to co-opt the critiques leveled against him, Eagleton responds, "The felicitous upshot is that nobody can ever criticise Fish, since if their criticisms are intelligible to him, they belong to his cultural game and are thus not really criticisms at all; and if they are not intelligible, they belong to some other set of conventions entirely and are therefore irrelevant."

In the essay "Sophistry about Conventions", philosopher Martha Nussbaum argues that Fish's theoretical views are based on "extreme relativism and even radical subjectivism." Discounting his work as nothing more than sophistry, Nussbaum claims that Fish "relies on the regulative principle of non-contradiction in order to adjudicate between competing principles", thereby relying on normative standards of argumentation even as he argues against them. Offering an alternative, Nussbaum cites John Rawls's work in A Theory of Justice to highlight "an example of a rational argument; it can be said to yield, in a perfectly recognizable sense, ethical truth." Nussbaum appropriates Rawls's critique of the insufficiencies of Utilitarianism, showing that a rational person will consistently prefer a system of justice that acknowledges boundaries between separate persons rather than relying on the aggregation of the sum total of desires. "This", she claims, "is altogether different from rhetorical manipulation."

Camille Paglia, author of Sexual Personae and public intellectual, denounced Fish as a "totalitarian Tinkerbell," charging him with hypocrisy for lecturing about multiculturalism from the perspective of a tenured professor at the homogeneous and sheltered ivory tower of Duke.

David Hirsch, a critic of post-structuralist influences on hermeneutics, censured Fish for "lapses in logical rigor" and "carelessness toward rhetorical precision." In an examination of Fish's arguments, Hirsch attempts to demonstrate that "not only was a restoration of New Critical methods unnecessary, but that Fish himself had not managed to rid himself of the shackles of New Critical theory." Hirsch compares Fish's work to Penelope's loom in the Odyssey, stating, "what one critic weaves by day, another unweaves by night." "Nor," he writes, "does this weaving and unweaving constitute a dialectic, since no forward movement takes place." Ultimately, Hirsch sees Fish as left to "wander in his own Elysian fields, hopelessly alienated from art, from truth, and from humanity."

== Personal life ==
He is married to literary critic Jane Tompkins.

== Literary references ==
Stanley Fish has been parodied in two novels by David Lodge in which he appears as "Morris Zapp".

== Awards ==
Fish received the PEN/Diamonstein-Spielvogel Award for the Art of the Essay in 1994 for There's No Such Thing As Free Speech, and it's a Good Thing, Too.

== Bibliography ==
=== Primary works by Fish ===
- John Skelton's Poetry. New Haven, CT: Yale UP, 1965.
- Surprised by Sin: The Reader in Paradise Lost. Cambridge, MA: Harvard UP, 1967. ISBN 0-674-85747-X (10). ISBN 978-0-674-85747-6 (13).
- Self-Consuming Artifacts: The Experience of Seventeenth-Century Literature. Berkeley, CA: U of California P, 1972.
- "Interpreting the Variorum." Critical Inquiry (1976).
- "Why We Can't All Just Get Along." First Things (1996).
- The Living Temple: George Herbert and Catechizing. Berkeley, CA: U of California P, 1978.
- Is There a Text in This Class? The Authority of Interpretive Communities. Cambridge, MA: Harvard UP, 1980. ISBN 0-674-46726-4 (10). ISBN 978-0-674-46726-2 (13).
- Doing What Comes Naturally: Change, Rhetoric, and the Practice of Theory in Literary and Legal Studies. Durham, NC: Duke UP, 1989.
- Professional Correctness: Literary Studies and Political Change. Cambridge, MA: Harvard U P, 1999.
- The Trouble with Principle. Cambridge, MA: Harvard UP, 1999.
- How Milton Works. Cambridge, MA: Harvard UP, 2001.
- Save The World on Your Own Time Oxford: Oxford University Press, 2008.
- The Fugitive in Flight: Faith, Liberalism, and Law in a Classic TV Show. University of Pennsylvania Press. 2010. Archived from the original on May 31, 2010.
- How to Write a Sentence: And How to Read One. New York, NY: HarperCollins Publishers, 2011.
- Versions of Antihumanism: Milton and Others. Cambridge: Cambridge University Press, 2012.
- *Versions of Academic Freedom: From Professionalism to Revolution. Chicago, IL: University of Chicago Press, 2014. ISBN 978-0-226-06431-4.
- Winning Arguments: What Works and Doesn't Work in Politics, the Bedroom, the Courtroom, and the Classroom. New York, NY: HarperCollins, 2016. ISBN 978-0-062-22665-5.
- The First: How to Think About Hate Speech, Campus Speech, Religious Speech, Fake News, Post-Truth, and Donald Trump. Atria/One Signal Publishers. 2019 ISBN 9781982115241.

=== Collections of works by Fish ===
- There's No Such Thing As Free Speech, and it's a Good Thing, Too. New York: Oxford UP, 1994.

The title essay and an additional essay, "Jerry Falwell's Mother," focus on free speech issues. In the latter piece, Fish argues that, if one has some answer in mind to the question "what is free speech good for?" along the lines of "in the free and open clash of viewpoints the truth can more readily be known," then it makes no sense to defend deliberate malicious libel (such as that which was at issue in the U.S. Supreme Court case of Hustler Magazine v. Falwell) in the name of "free speech."

- The Stanley Fish Reader. Ed. H. Aram Veeser. London: Blackwell Publishers, 1999.
- Think Again: Contrarian Reflections on Life, Culture, Politics, Religion, Law, and Education, Princeton, (2015), ISBN 9780691167718

== See also ==
- Formalism
- New Criticism
