= Self-Consuming Artifacts =

1972 book by Stanley Fish

- Author: Stanley Fish
- Language: English
- Genre: Literary criticism
- Publisher: University of California Press
- Publication date: 1972
- Publication place: United States
- ISBN: 978-0520027640

Self-Consuming Artifacts: The Experience of Seventeenth-Century Literature (Berkeley: University of California Press, 1972, ISBN 978-0520027640) is book of literary criticism by American literary critic Stanley Fish. In it, Fish examines various English writers from the seventeenth century, including Sir Francis Bacon, George Herbert, John Bunyan, and John Milton. Since it explores the reader's experience of reading the text, it can be considered an example of reader-response criticism.

The book has been described variously as "influential", "a classic of scholarship". and as one of the author's "two revolutionary books"
