= The Anatomy of Melancholy =

1621 book by Robert Burton

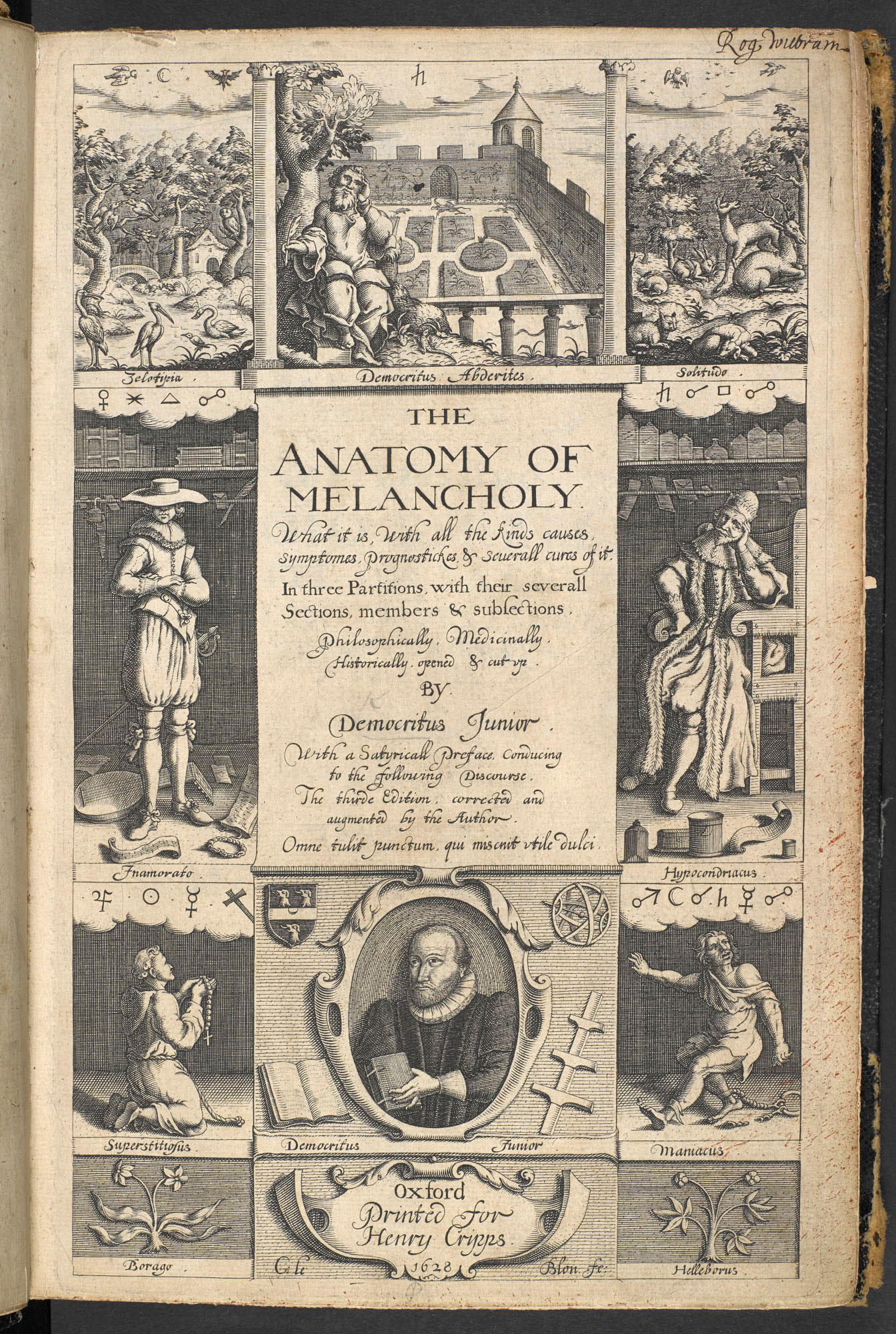
- Allegorical frontispiece to the 1628 third edition, engraved by Christian Le Blon
- Author: Robert Burton
- Language: Early Modern English
- Genre: Medicine, philosophy
- Publication date: 1621
- Publication place: England
- Media type: Print
- Dewey Decimal: 616.89
- LC Class: PR2223 .A1

The Anatomy of Melancholy (full title: The Anatomy of Melancholy, What it is: With all the Kinds, Causes, Symptomes, Prognostickes, and Several Cures of it. In Three Maine Partitions with their several Sections, Members, and Subsections. Philosophically, Medicinally, Historically, Opened and Cut Up) is a book by Robert Burton, first published in 1621 but republished five more times over the next seventeen years with massive alterations and expansions.

The book is a medical treatise about melancholy (depression). Over 500,000 words long, it discusses a wide range of topics besides depression – including history, astronomy, geography, and various aspects of literature and science – and frequently uses humour to make points or explain topics. Burton wrote it under the pseudonym Democritus Junior as a reference to the Ancient Greek "laughing philosopher" Democritus.

The Anatomy of Melancholy inspired several writers of the following centuries, such as Enlightenment figures like Samuel Johnson and modern authors like Philip Pullman. Romantic poet John Keats said Anatomy was his favourite book. Portions of Burton's writing were used by Laurence Sterne in Tristram Shandy during the 1750s and 1760s.

== Synopsis ==
Although presented as a medical text, The Anatomy of Melancholy is often seen as much a sui generis work of literature as it is a scientific or philosophical text; when Anatomy was reprinted in 2001, The Guardian described it in a review as going beyond medicine: "Made out of all the books that existed in a 17th-century library, it was compiled to explain and account for all human emotion and thought." Both comedic and serious in tone, Anatomy has frequent "pervading humour" among its scientific writing and often verges on stream of consciousness.

Anatomy starts with a roughly 200-page-long satirical introduction, "Democritus to the Reader", narrated by Burton's pseudonym Democritus Junior. Here he gives his often-quoted reason for writing the book: "I write of melancholy by being busy to avoid melancholy." He defines his subject as:

Melancholy, the subject of our present discourse, is either in disposition or in habit. In disposition, is that transitory Melancholy which goes and comes upon every small occasion of sorrow, need, sickness, trouble, fear, grief, passion, or perturbation of the mind, any manner of care, discontent, or thought, which causes anguish, dulness, heaviness and vexation of spirit, any ways opposite to pleasure, mirth, joy, delight, causing forwardness in us, or a dislike. In which equivocal and improper sense, we call him melancholy, that is dull, sad, sour, lumpish, ill-disposed, solitary, any way moved, or displeased. And from these melancholy dispositions no man living is free, no Stoic, none so wise, none so happy, none so patient, so generous, so godly, so divine, that can vindicate himself; so well-composed, but more or less, some time or other, he feels the smart of it. Melancholy in this sense is the character of Mortality... This Melancholy of which we are to treat, is a habit, a serious ailment, a settled humour, as Aurelianus and others call it, not errant, but fixed: and as it was long increasing, so, now being (pleasant or painful) grown to a habit, it will hardly be removed.

— Robert Burton, The Anatomy of Melancholy

The main body of the book is divided into three partitions. The first partition is "The Causes of Melancholy", the second partition is "The Cure of Melancholy", and the third partition is "Love-Melancholy and Religious Melancholy". Each of these has a large number of sections and subsections.

The book regularly quotes ancient and medieval medical authorities, including Hippocrates, Aristotle, and Galen, and Burton included a great deal of Latin poetry – much of it from ancient sources left untranslated. A significant number of these citations are incorrect, taken out of context, or simply fabricated. Karl Hagen speculated in his Project Gutenberg edition that Burton's misquotations may be the result of quoting from memory.

The second edition, published in 1624, contains the first recorded use of the word polymath in English. Burton uses it while describing the lengths scholars go to for fame:

"To be counted writers, scriptores ut salutentur [to be greeted as authors], to be thought and held polumathes and polihistors, to get a paper kingdome, they will rush into all learning, togatum, armatum [civilian, soldier], divine, humane authors rake over all Indices & pamphlets for notes, as our merchants doe strange havens for traffique."

— Robert Burton, The Anatomy of Melancholy, "Democritus to the Reader"

== Background ==
Much of Anatomy was inspired by Burton's own struggles with depression. His melancholy is the most widely acknowledged feature of his life; he wrote the book in part to relieve this melancholy but found it difficult to do so. Fellow Oxfordian White Kennett wrote that Burton could flit between "interval[s] of vapours" in which he was lively and social, and periods of isolation in his college chambers where his peers worried he was suicidal. His epitaph — which is believed to have been written by Burton himself – in Christ Church Cathedral states: "Known to few, unknown to fewer, here lies Democritus Junior, to whom Melancholy gave both life and death." Literary historian Jonathan Lamb sees Burton's depression as a counterpart to his academic knowledge:

"Burton shows most vividly how an odd individual can inhabit a book world and use its contents to reveal himself. His experience does not extend beyond the shelves of his college's well-stocked library; all his travelling is done by map, but because his theme is melancholy, a disorder afflicting the whole world as well as himself, he can never find an appropriate or standard response to the information of books. Although texts are exclusively his source for estimations of reality, they offer him neither order nor a coherent body of symptoms. So Burton is constantly expatiating, 'ranging in and out', his moods constantly shifting between despair and optimism, anger and helpless laughter, all stimulated by the books he is endlessly traversing."

— Jonathan Lamb, Sterne's System of Imitation

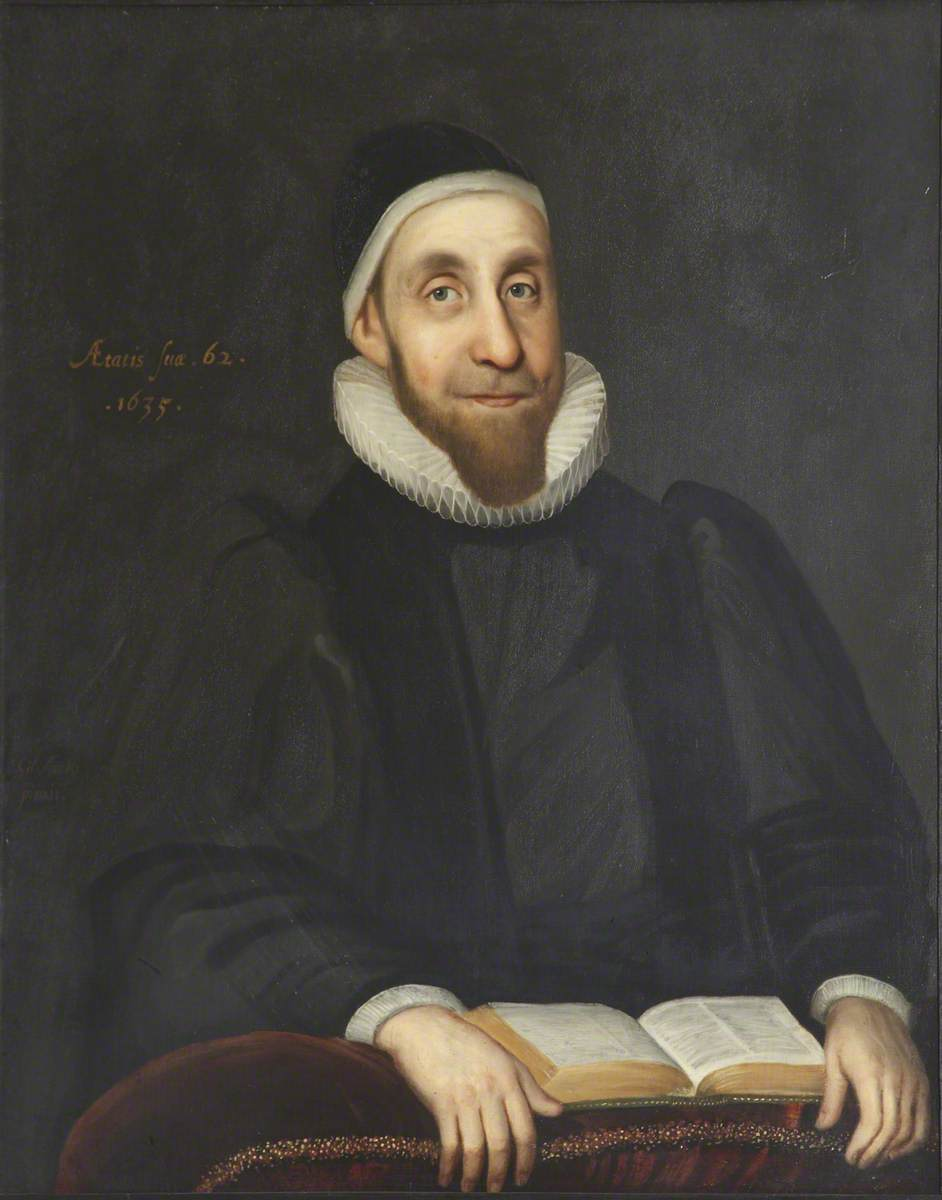
Portrait of Robert Burton by Gilbert Jackson, 1635

Most of Burton's life was spent at the University of Oxford, and the majority of his information for Anatomy came secondhand through the books of the Oxford library; melancholy was a topic with which he had personal experience. Lamb notes that "he writes about melancholy in a melancholy manner, exhibiting in his treatise all the contradictions and irregularities that belong to the disease. Burton's real melancholy is both excited and controlled by books and his imitations of them".

Burton left no record of when he began his work on Anatomy. His biographer Michael O'Connell speculates the project grew piecemeal, with research beginning in his twenties and the work well on its way by his thirties. Burton explicitly states that the study of melancholy was a lifelong fascination of his, and regularly "deducted from the main channel of my studies". However long the work took, it was finished by 5 December 1620 (when he was 43), which is the date he signed the conclusion of the book.

== Publication ==
Bibliographical information for Burton's Anatomy
Date	Edition	Binding	Location	Words
1621	1st	4to	Oxford	353,369
1624	2nd	fo	Oxford	423,983
1628	3rd	fo	Oxford	476,855
1632	4th	fo	Oxford	505,592
1638	5th	fo	Oxford	514,116
1651	6th	fo	Oxford	516,384
1660	7th	fo	London	516,384
1676	8th	fo	London	516,384

Burton was an obsessive editor of his own work, and published five revised and expanded editions of The Anatomy of Melancholy during his lifetime. The first edition was a single quarto volume nearly 900 pages long; subsequent editions were even longer.

It has often been out of print, particularly between 1676 and 1800. Because no original manuscript of Anatomy has survived, later reprints have drawn more or less faithfully from the editions published during Burton's life.

Early editions have entered the public domain, with several available from online sources such as Project Gutenberg. In recent decades, increased interest in the book, combined with its public domain status, has resulted in new print editions, most recently in 2021 under the Penguin Classics imprint, edited by Angus Gowland (ISBN 978-0-241-53375-8), and before that, a 2001 reprinting of the 1932 Everyman's Library edition by The New York Review of Books under its NYRB Classics imprint (ISBN 0-940322-66-8).

== Legacy and influence ==
Medical historian Roy Porter called The Anatomy of Melancholy "that omniumgatherum of anecdotes of insanity whose burden was that mankind — including the author himself — was quite out of its mind." Despite its origins as a medical treatise, studies of Anatomy over the last 400 years have almost entirely focused on its value as literature. Burton's numerous anecdotes, which tackle melancholy with both sobriety and humour, as well as the overarching influence of his personal sadness on the book, are often cited as making Anatomy his "one truly great work".

In the 18th and 19th centuries, melancholy became somewhat fashionable for the upper classes – owing in part to the popularity of works like The Sorrows of Young Werther by Johann Wolfgang von Goethe, the Gothic genre, and Romanticism. This so-called "Age of Melancholy" resulted in a rediscovery of Burton's Anatomy, which had seen a dwindling audience over the previous century and had been out of print since 1676. Charles Lamb's push for a 9th edition in 1800 revitalised interest in the book, and it became a "literary phenomenon".

Samuel Taylor Coleridge regularly annotated his copy of Anatomy. William Wordsworth, Robert Southey, William Green, and Herman Melville were all known to own the book.

Figures like O. Henry, Anthony Powell, Northrop Frye, and Cy Twombly cite Anatomy as influential in their own work. Jorge Luis Borges used a line from Burton as an epigraph to his story "The Library of Babel", and Washington Irving quotes from it on the title page of The Sketch Book. Holbrook Jackson based the style and presentation of his Anatomy of Bibliomania on The Anatomy of Melancholy. The book "lurks behind the writing" of Samuel Beckett's novel Murphy, and Jacques Barzun believed it predicted 20th-century psychiatry.

=== John Milton ===
English poet John Milton used Anatomy as the basis for his poem about melancholy, "Il Penseroso" ("the thinker"). It was most likely composed around ten years after the first edition was published. Thomas Warton described Milton as "an attentive reader of Burton's book".

Several of his works, including the epic poem Paradise Lost, exhibit parallels to Anatomy. This includes the "golden chain" attached to "this pendant world", as well as descriptions of demons and theories of predestination. Milton scholar George Wesley Whiting writes that "in addition to agreeing upon the fundamental points of theology, demonology, cosmography and morality, Burton and Milton condemn war and military glory". "Il Penseroso" (and its companion poem "L'Allegro") contrasts melancholy with mirth in a similar way to Burton's distinction between "bad" melancholy and "good" melancholy.

=== Samuel Johnson ===
"If you are idle, be not solitary; if you are solitary, be not idle," one of Johnson's most famous quotes, is adapted from Anatomy. The full quote reads: "The great direction Burton has left to men disordered like you, is this, Be not solitary; be not idle: which I would thus modify; – If you are idle, be not solitary; if you are solitary, be not idle."

Writer Samuel Johnson called Anatomy "a valuable work", saying "there is a great spirit and great power in what Burton says". Johnson suffered from bouts of "horrible melancholia" and, at one point, "strongly entertained thoughts of suicide", according to his biographer James Boswell. Like many of his contemporaries, he believed that writers such as himself were especially predisposed to melancholy. Most of his attempted remedies for his own depression came from treatments prescribed by the Anatomy of Melancholy. Chief among these was "constant occupation of mind"; Johnson found that staying busy helped ward off melancholy, which was a significant reason his writing was so prolific. He described Anatomy as "the only book that ever got him out of bed two hours sooner than he wished to rise".

=== Laurence Sterne ===
In 1798, John Ferriar published the paper Illustrations of Sterne, which pointed out that Laurence Sterne's 1759 novel The Life and Opinions of Tristram Shandy, Gentleman used passages from Anatomy almost word for word. Sterne also took sections from Of Death by Francis Bacon and several other books. Besides copying text, Sterne referenced Burton's book divisions in the titles of his chapters, and he parodied his account of Cicero's grief for the death of his daughter Tullia. These accusations of plagiarism further fuelled the revived interest in Burton's work at the turn of the 19th century.

=== John Keats ===
The Romantic English poet John Keats considered The Anatomy of Melancholy his favourite book. Keats was a Romanticist with poetic views of the human body and emotions, as well as a surgeon trained in medicine and physiology. Literary scholar Robert White argues that this duality made Keats unique among Burton's 19th-century audience: "Keats was the only one to have a professional foot in both fields and could read it as both a poet, and as a doctor professionally aware of its historical medical context." He also suffered from depressive episodes for much of his life, saying in an 1817 letter that "I scarcely remember counting upon any happiness."

During his highly productive period of 1819, Keats read and reread Burton's Anatomy. He owned a copy of the 11th edition (1813), which he heavily annotated. He put exclamation marks next to passages about solutions for heartache and underlined the phrase "The last and best Cure of Love-Melancholy, is to let them have their Desire." On the blank page at the end of the book Keats created his own index of passages he liked; these were mostly love stories or descriptions of tyrants. One of his marked sections of Anatomy told the story of star-crossed Corinthian lovers Lycius and Lamia — he later adapted Burton's retelling of the tale into his 1819 poem "Lamia".

The final book Keats published during his lifetime, Lamia, Isabella, The Eve of St Agnes and Other Poems (1820), is influenced throughout by Anatomy, which was "the book which has been his companion during 1819". His poem "Ode on Melancholy" also heavily incorporates themes from Anatomy.

=== Philip Pullman ===
In April 2005, English author Philip Pullman published an essay in The Telegraph about his love for Burton's Anatomy. He argues that the 400-year-old book is worth looking past its convoluted nature:

"This book is very long. What's more, like the book Alice's sister was reading on that famous summer afternoon, it has no pictures or conversation in it. To add to the drawbacks, parts of it are in Latin. And finally, as if that wasn't bad enough, it is founded on totally outdated notions of anatomy, physiology, psychology, cosmology and just about every other -logy there ever was. So what on earth makes it worth reading today? And not only worth reading, but a glorious and intoxicating and endlessly refreshing reward for reading? The main reason is perhaps the least literary. It's that The Anatomy of Melancholy is the revelation of a personality: a personality so vivid and generous, so humorous, so humane, so tolerant and cranky and wise, so filled with bizarre knowledge and so rich in absurd and touching anecdotes, that an hour in his company is a stimulant to the soul."

— Philip Pullman, "Reasons to be cheerful", The Telegraph

Pullman has cited it as his favourite book on other occasions and lives near Burton's hometown of Oxford. He claims that "Burton's humanity blows like a gale", saying "his very language sparkles" as he describes medical treatments and scenes from history. It's listed among the books that influenced his own writing, such as his trilogy His Dark Materials.

"Is the book in any sense a cure for melancholy? Our word 'depression' has always seemed to me far too genteel, too decorous for this savage and merciless torment. Anything that can palliate it is worth knowing; and certainly no disorder has ever had so rich, so funny, so subtle and so eccentric an anatomy. We can learn much from his psychology."

— Philip Pullman, "Reasons to be cheerful", The Telegraph
