= Old Reds =

This is a list of "Old Reds", former students of the Uniting Church school Prince Alfred College in Adelaide, South Australia, Australia.

== Rhodes scholars ==
The Rhodes Scholarship is a postgraduate scholarship for study at Oxford University. As of 2026, PAC has educated 21 Rhodes Scholars throughout its 157 year history. Recipients who attended PAC include:

Rhodes Scholar	Year awarded	College at Oxford	Ref
William Douglas Allen (1914–2008)	1937	New College	
Henry Brose (1890–1965)	1913	Christ Church	
Garry Leslie Brown	1964	Magdalen	
Theodor Siegfried Dorsch	1933	Christ Church	
David Wyke Evans (1934–2024)	1957	New College	
Henry Fry (1886–1959)	1909	Balliol	
Sir Brian Hone (1907–1978)	1930	New College	
Stanford Howard	1919	Christ Church	
Norman Jolly (1882–1954)	1904	Balliol	
Cecil Madigan (1889–1947)	1911	Magdalen	
Ryan Paul Manuel	2006	Merton	
Roger Gilbert Opie (1927–1998)	1951	Christ Church	
Renfrey Potts (1925–2005)	1948	Queen's	
Howard Rayner (1896–1975)	1916	Balliol	
David Alexander Robertson	1983	Magdalen	
Peter Lindsay Rogers (1940–2024)	1963	New College	
Michael Ewers Smyth	1960	Exeter	
Mahesh Umapathysivam	2014	St Peter's	
Stephen Kidman Wilkinson	1982	New College	
Max Kirkby	2023	Magdalen	
Joshua Lesicar	2026	St John's College	

== Academia and education ==
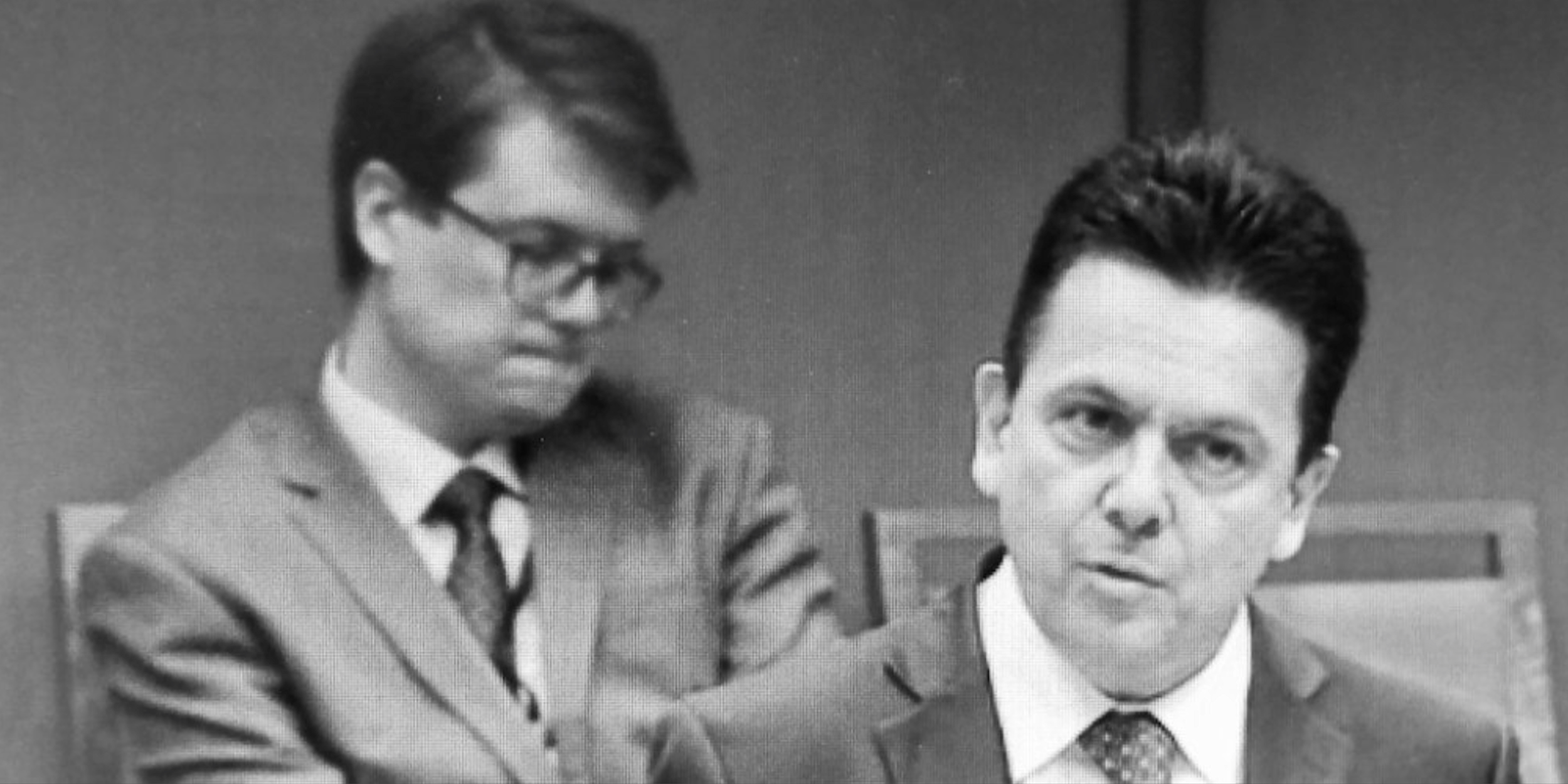
Old Reds Senator Nick Xenophon and, behind him, historian C. J. Coventry in the Australian Senate, 2015.

- Herbert Basedow (1881–1933), Anthropologist, geologist, explorer, politician
- C. J. Coventry (1991–), social historian
- Harold Whitridge Davies (1894–1946), professor of physiology
- Frank Ellis (1886–1964), educationist
- Sir Brian Hone OBE FACE (1907–1978), Headmaster – Cranbrook School NSW and Melbourne Grammar School Vic
- David Horner (1948–), military and official historian
- Leslie Cyril Jauncey (1899–1959), Harvard Business School economist, Marxist and life-long friend of King O'Malley
- George Henry Pitt (1891–1972), librarian, archivist and historian,
- James Leonard Rossiter (1887–1962), headmaster and freemason grand master
- Russel Ward (1914–1995), Marxist historian
- Reginald Arthur West (1883–1964), headmaster of Adelaide High School
- Frederick William Wheatley (1871–1955), science and mathematics teacher

== Business and agriculture ==
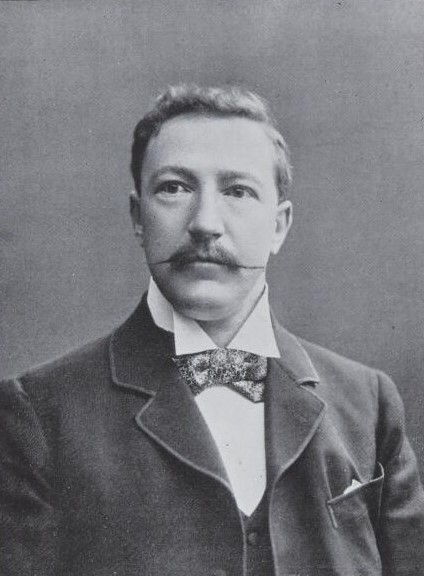
Old Red Hugh Denison, tobacco manufacturer and MP

- Sir Wallace Bruce (1878–1944), insurance broker and commission merchant, chaired the 1932 advisory committee on unemployment
- Hermann Paul Leopold (Leo) Buring (1876–1961), winemaker and councillor
- Arnold Edwin Davey (1862–1920), businessman and arbitrator
- Arthur Leonard (Art) Collins (1896–1969), pastoralist and sheep breeder
- Tim Cooper (1955–), CEO of Coopers Brewery
- Glenn Cooper (1952–), Executive Chairman of Coopers Brewery
- Harold Gordon Darling (1885–1950), CEO of John Darling and Son, chairman of the board of B.H.P, founding member of the Institute of Public Affairs.
- Sir Hugh Robert Denison (1865–1940), tobacco manufacturer, newspaper proprietor and member of the House of Assembly SA and NSW.
- Sir Herbert William (Bert) Gepp (1877–1954), mining metallurgist and manager, public servant, industrialist and publicist,
- Kenneth Edward (Ken) Gerard (1912–1993), businessman, electrician and philanthropist
- Robert Gerard, businessman, previously Chairman of Gerard Industries
- Hubert Harold Harvey (1913–1968), prolific businessman and key figure in Santos Ltd

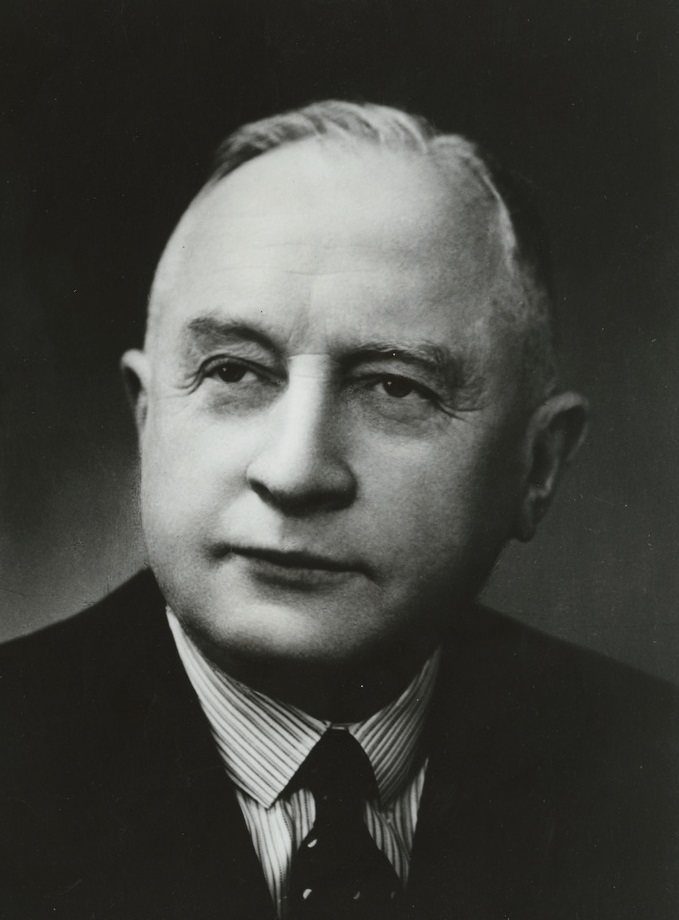
Old Red Sir Edward Holden, founder of Holden car company

- Howard Frederick Hobbs (1902–1982), inventor of automatic transmission
- Sidney Edwin Hocking (1859–1935), newspaper proprietor
- Sir Edward Holden (1885–1947), Founder of Holden, vehicle manufacturer
- Sir Oscar Lionel Isaachsen (1885–1951), banker and anti-communist campaigner
- Norman William Jolly (1882–1954), forester
- William Stanley Kelly (1882–1969), agricultural industry representative
- Sir John Melrose (1860–1938), pastoralist
- Harold Waddell McGregor (1898–1978), woolbroker
- Sir James Robert McGregor (1889–1973), woolbroker
- John Lloyd Preece (1895–1969), bookseller and publisher
- Oscar Benno Seppelt (1873–1963), winemaker and viticulturist, CEO of Seppeltsfield, president of the South Australian Chamber of Manufactures (1930–32) and of the Associated Chambers of Manufactures of Australia (1933)
- Greg Siegele, Co-founder of Ratbag Games Pty Ltd
- Sir Eric Fleming Smart (1911–1973), wheat-farmer and grazier
- Harry Samuel Taylor (1873–1932), newspaper owner, Christian Socialists and White Australia advocate
- William Edward Wainwright (1873–1959), mining and metallurgical engineer, government adviser

== Clergy ==
- Nicholas John Cocks (1867–1925), Congregational minister and early advocate for the Uniting Church
- Ernest Henry Woollacott (1888–1977), Methodist minister, president (1949–50) of the State committee of the World Council of Churches and a founder of Westminster School, Adelaide

== Entertainment and the arts ==
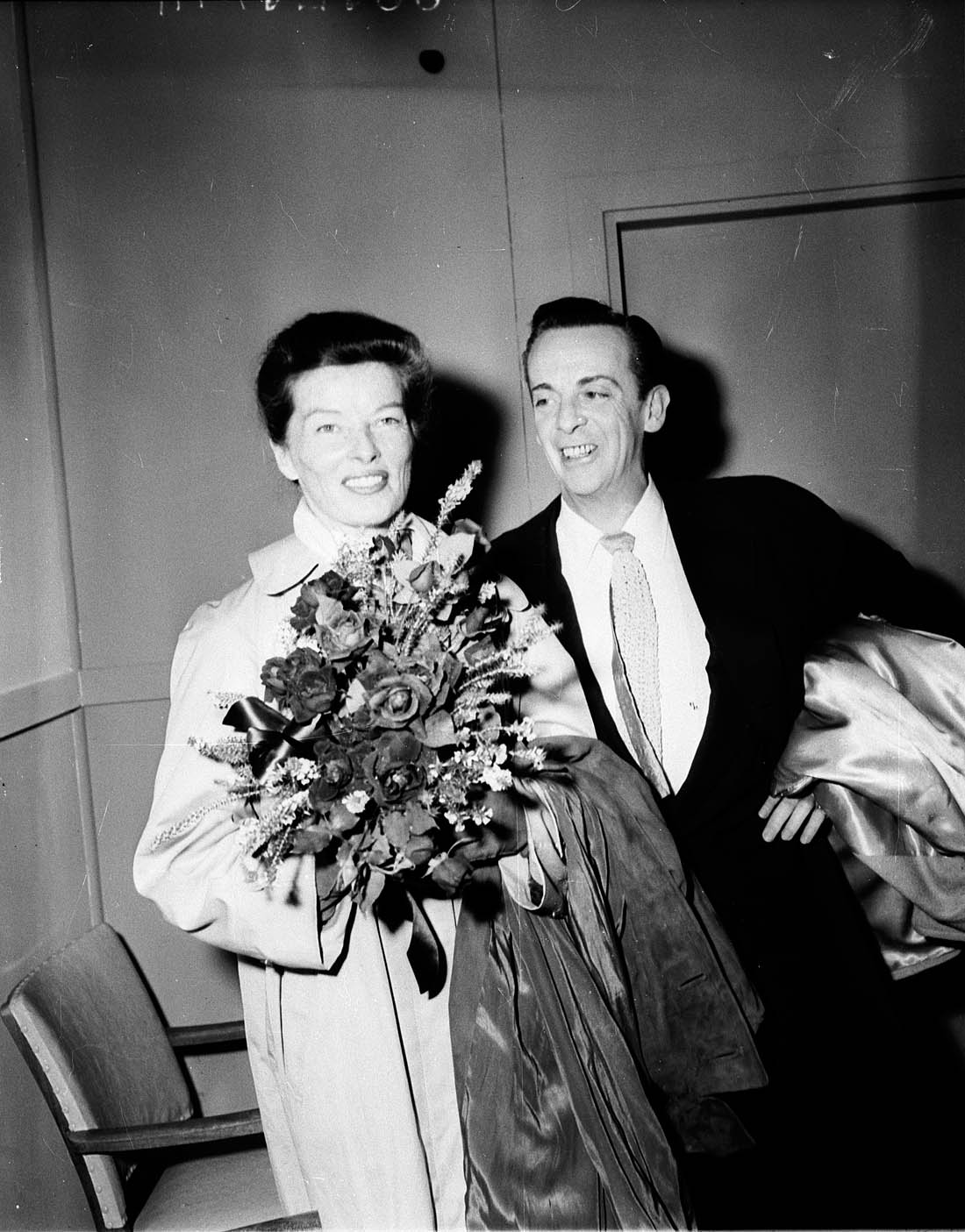
Old Red Robert Helpmann with friend and co-star Katharine Hepburn, 1955.

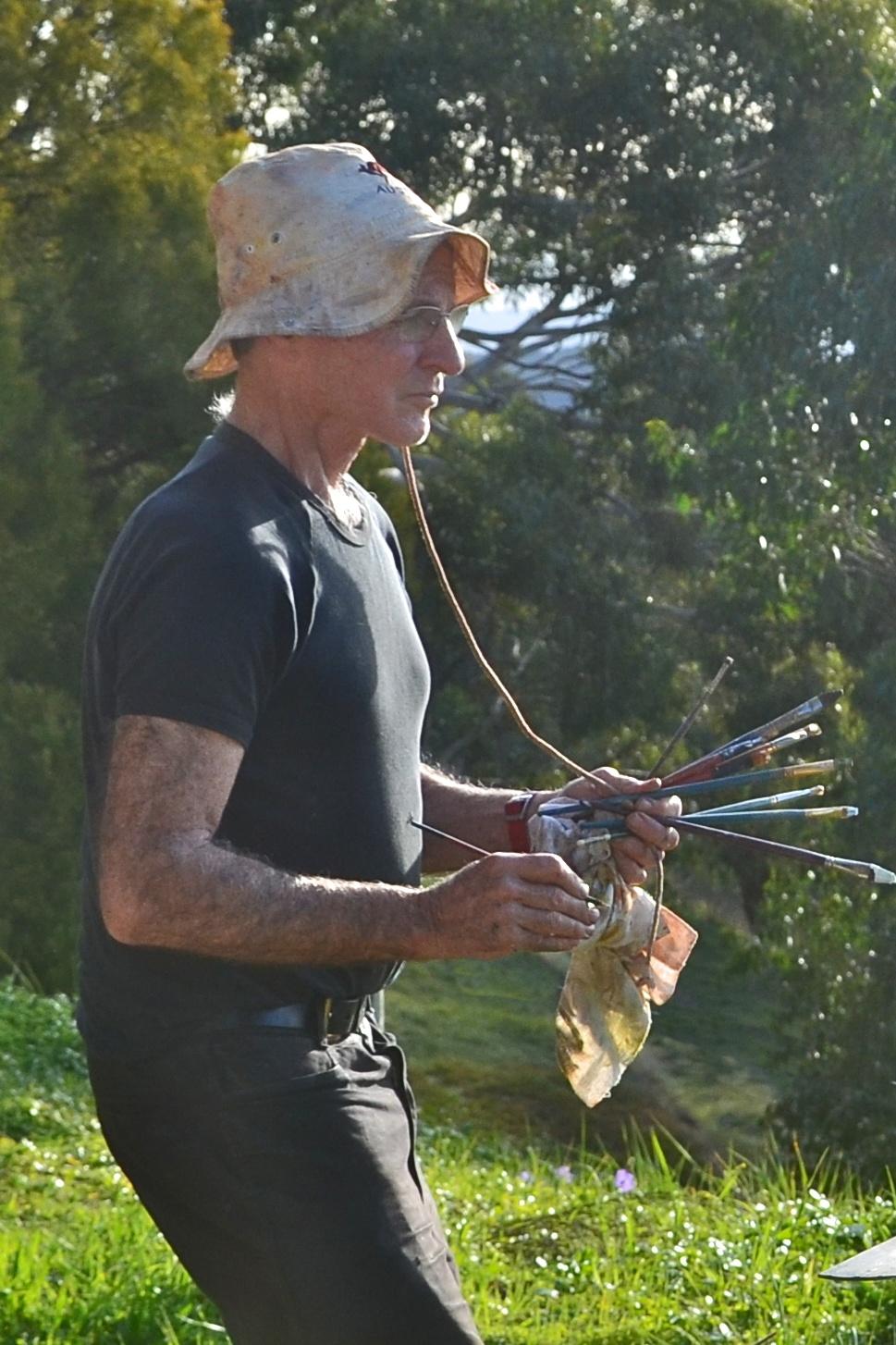
Old Red Robert Hannaford, realist sculptor

- Sir John Ashton, OBE, ROI (1881–1963), Painter and Director of the National Art Gallery of New South Wales
- Charles Baeyertz (1866–1943), publisher of The Triad, critic and broadcaster
- Chris Bailey (1950–2013), bass guitarist with ARIA award-winning Australian Bands 'The Angels' and 'GANGgajang'
- Gustave Adrian Barnes (1877–1921), artist
- David Basheer, association football (soccer) commentator and analyst
- Adolph Wilhelm Rudolph (Rudi) (1872–1950), horticultural sketcher and industrialist
- John Henry Chinner (1865–1933), caricaturist and PAC board member
- Norman Chinner (1909–1961), organist and conductor
- Sir Thomas Melrose Coombe (1873–1959), businessman, film exhibitor and philanthropist
- Bob Francis (1939–2016), radio presenter, FIVEaa
- Robert Hannaford, AM (1944–), portrait painter and sculptor
- Sir Ivor Hele (1912–1993), war artist and prolific portraitist
- Sir Robert Helpmann, CBE (1909–1986), Ballet dancer, actor, director and choreographer
- Laurence Hotham Howie (1876–1963), artist and teacher, president of the (Royal) South Australian Society of Arts in 1927–32 and 1935–37
- Reginald Charles (Rex) Ingamells (1913–1955), poet and editor
- Graham Jenkin, poet, composer and historian
- Hayley Lever (1876–1958), painter
- Adam Liaw (1978–), lawyer and winner of 2010 MasterChef Australia
- Rex Heading (1929–2010), the creator of Humphrey B. Bear whose show won two Logies; former managing director of Channel Nine
- Timothy David Piper (1989) Acclaimed Filmmaker

== Exploration ==
- Duncan Chessell (1970–), mountaineer
- Cecil Madigan (1889–1947), explorer, geologist, Rhodes Scholar, university lecturer
- Andrew Martin (1951–), marathon swimmer, first recorded solo crossing of the treacherous Backstairs Passage between Cape Jervis and Kangaroo Island

== Judiciary, civic leadership and public service ==
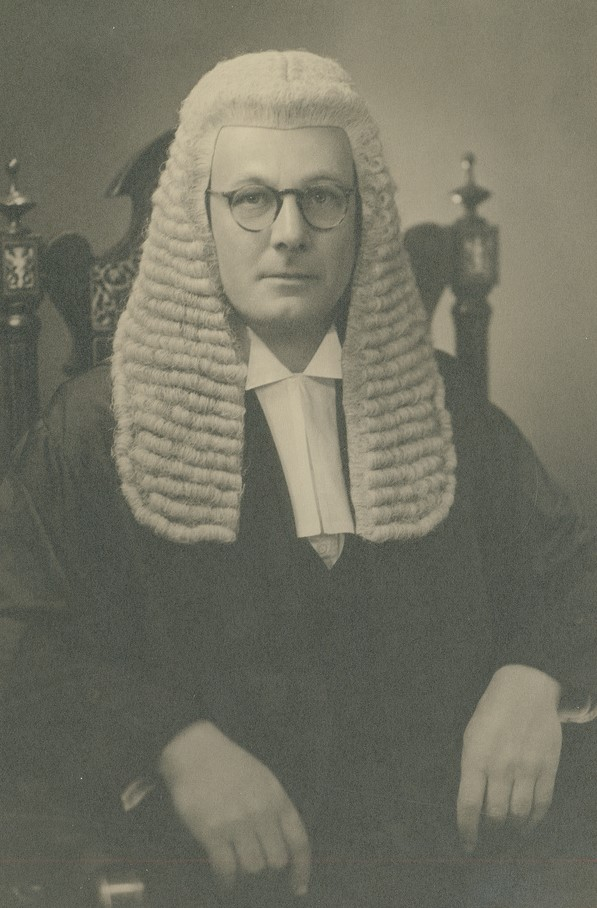
Old Red Justice Geoffrey Reed of the Supreme Court prior to becoming the first Director-General of the Australian Security Intelligence Organisation (ASIO)

- Hugh Thomas Moffitt Angwin (1888–1949), engineer and public servant
- Harold Boas (1883–1980), Perth architect, town planner and Jewish community leader
- Edward Erskine Cleland (1869–1943), barrister and justice of the Supreme Court of South Australia
- Reginald Joseph (Reg) Coombe (1899–1985), magistrate
- Sir Russell John Dumas (1887–1975), public servant and engineer
- Allan Cuthbert Harris (1904–1996), forester, public servant, and government-enterprise manager
- Elliott Johnston (1918–2011), Justice of the South Australian Supreme Court and the only openly communist judge in Australian history, Commissioner of the Royal Commission into Aboriginal Deaths in Custody (1989–91)
- Alexander Melrose (1865–1944), solicitor, writer and patron of the arts
- Harold Bayard Piper (1894–1953), chief judge of the Arbitration Court 1941–47
- Sir Herbert Angas Parsons (1872–1945), Justice of the Supreme Court of SA, member of the House of Assembly
- Sir Geoffrey Reed (1892–1970), judge in the Supreme Court of South Australia, first Director-General of ASIO

== Politics ==
=== Federal ===
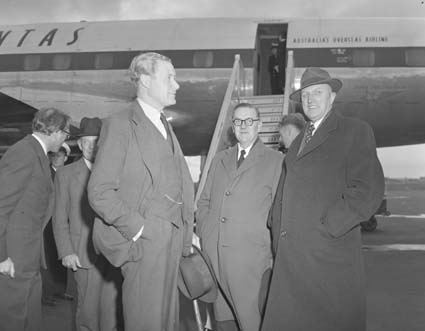
Old Red Sir Philip McBride (centre, wearing glasses) meets the British delegation, including The Lord Carington and Duncan Sandys

- Cory Bernardi (1969–), Senator for South Australia from 2006 to 2020, member of the Legislative Council 2026 - present, leader of One Nation South Australia.
- Gordon Bilney (1939–2012), Labor member of the House of Representatives, Minister for Defence Science and Personnel from 1990 to 1993, Minister for Development Cooperation and Pacific Island Affairs from 1993 to 1996, OECD official, High Commissioner to the West Indies
- Grant Chapman (1949–), Member for Division of Kingston (1975–1983) and Senator for South Australia (1988–2008)
- John Chapman (1879–1931), Country Party senator for South Australia
- David Combe (1943–2019), National Secretary of the Australian Labor Party from 1973 to 1981.
- David Fawcett (1963–), Liberal Senator for South Australia, former assistant minister for defence
- Joel Moses Gabb (1882–1951), Labor then independent member of the House of Representatives
- Clive Hannaford (1903–1967), Liberal and independent senator for South Australia from 1950 to 1967.
- Charles Robert Kelly (1912–1997), politician, farmer and columnist, Nationals MP 1958–77, minister of works, minister of the navy
- Sir Philip Albert Martin McBride (1892–1982), member of the House of Representatives (1931–43; 1946–58), minister of defence 1950–58
- Horace Keyworth Nock (1879–1958), Country Party member of House of Representatives
- Rex Pearson (1905–1961), Liberal senator for South Australia
- Nick Xenophon (1959–), Senator for South Australia from 2008 to 2017.
- Sir Harold Young (1923–2006), senator for South Australia, President of the Senate from 1981 to 1983.

=== State ===
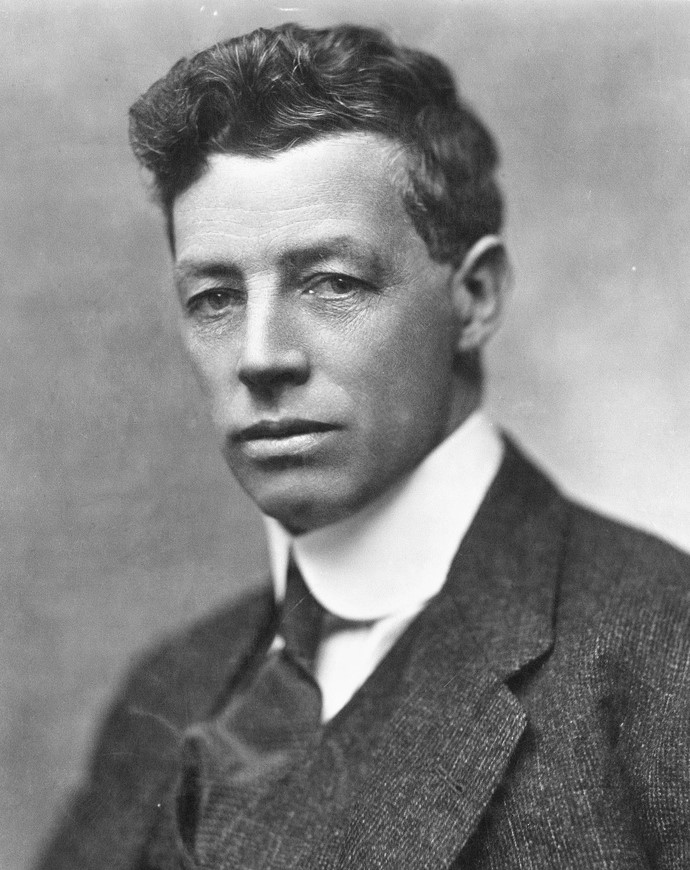
Old Red Crawford Vaughan, 27th Premier of South Australia and 2nd Labor Premier

- Sir John Lavington Bonython (1875–1960), editor of The Advertiser, Lord Mayor of Adelaide (1927–1930)
- Francis Cotton (1857–1942), founding member of the NSW Labor Party, unionist, later Free Trade politician
- John Lancelot Cowan, Member for the District of Southern Districts (1949–1959) in the South Australian Legislative Council
- John Dawkins, President of the Legislative Council (2020-2022), Member of the Legislative Council (1997-2022)
- Fraser Ellis (1992–), Independent member of the House of Assembly
- Edward Allan Farquhar (1871–1935), Councillor, Alderman and Chair of Finance on the Port Adelaide City Council
- Charles Glover (1870–1936), first Lord Mayor of the City of Adelaide (1919)
- Hermann Robert (1874–1964), member of the Legislative Council, two-time SA attorney-general, minister for industry
- Sir Shirley Williams Jeffries (1886–1963), SA attorney-general, minister of education, and minister of industry and employment.
- George Richards Laffer (1866–1933), minister and Speaker of the House of Assembly
- Nick McBride, independent member of the Legislative Assembly
- Sir Alexander Lyell McEwin (1897–1988), member of SA parliament 1934–1975, chief secretary, minister for mines, minister for health
- Major-General Sir Newton Moore KCMG (1870–1936), eighth Premier of Western Australia, World War I general, member of the UK House of Commons
- Sir Frank Tennyson Perry (1887–1965), member of the legislative council, industrialist, wartime public servant.
- Robert Thomson Robinson (1867–1926), WA attorney-general, minister for mines, minister for industry
- Crawford Vaughan (1874–1947), Premier of South Australia 1915–17
- John Howard Vaughan (1879–1955), union leader and Attorney-General of South Australia
- Sir Frederick William Young (1876–1948), member of the South Australian House of Assembly 1902–05 and 1909–15, commissioner of crown lands and immigration in 1912–14, South Australian agent-general in London 1915–18, member of the House of Commons 1918–22.

== Medical, mathematics, natural and social sciences ==
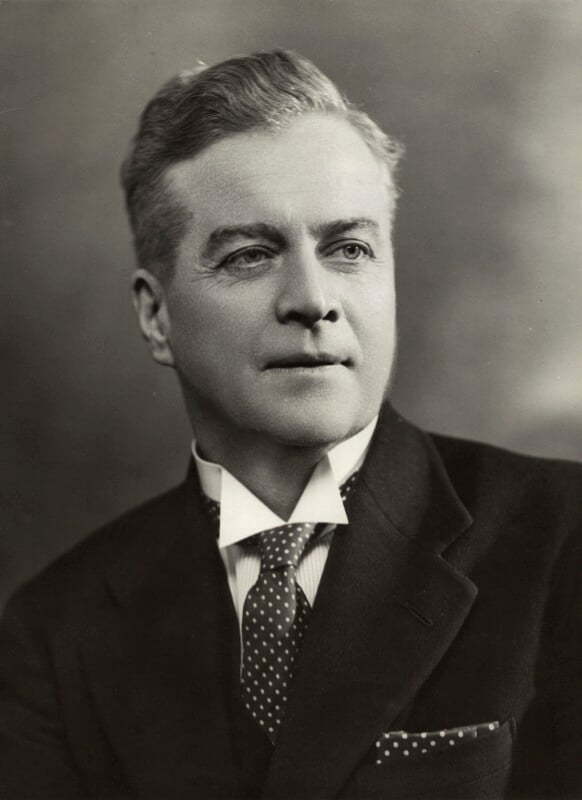
Old Red Lionel Logue, made recently famous by The King's Speech (2010).

- Herbert Basedow (1881–1933), anthropologist, geologist, explorer, politician
- Isaac Herbert Boas (1878–1955), botanist
- Roger Brissenden (1962–) Deputy Director, Harvard-Smithsonian Center for Astrophysics
- Henry Brose (1890–1965), physicist, translator, pathologist, biochemist, academic, Rhodes Scholar
- Thomas Draper Campbell (1893–1967), professor of dentistry and anthropologist
- Donald Brook Cheek (1924–1990), medical scientist and paediatrician
- Charles Chewings (1859–1937), geologist and anthropologist
- Sir Raphael Cilento, medical practitioner and public health administrator
- Sir John Burton Cleland, CBE (1878–1971), Naturalist, microbiologist, mycologist, ornithologist, Professor of Pathology
- Sir Darcy Rivers Warren Cowan (1885–1958), medical practitioner
- William Andrew Dibden (1914–1993), psychiatrist
- Hugo Flecker (1884–1957), medical practitioner, radiotherapist, toxicologist and natural historian
- Henry Fry, DSO (1886–1959), Physician, anthropologist, Rhodes Scholar
- Bill Griggs, AM, ASM, doctor
- Herbert Mathew Hale (1895–1963), Director of the South Australian Museum
- Brian Kenneth Hobbs (1937–2004), doctor
- Frank Sandland Hone (1871–1951), medical practitioner
- Lewis Wibmer Jeffries (1884–1971), medical practitioner and soldier

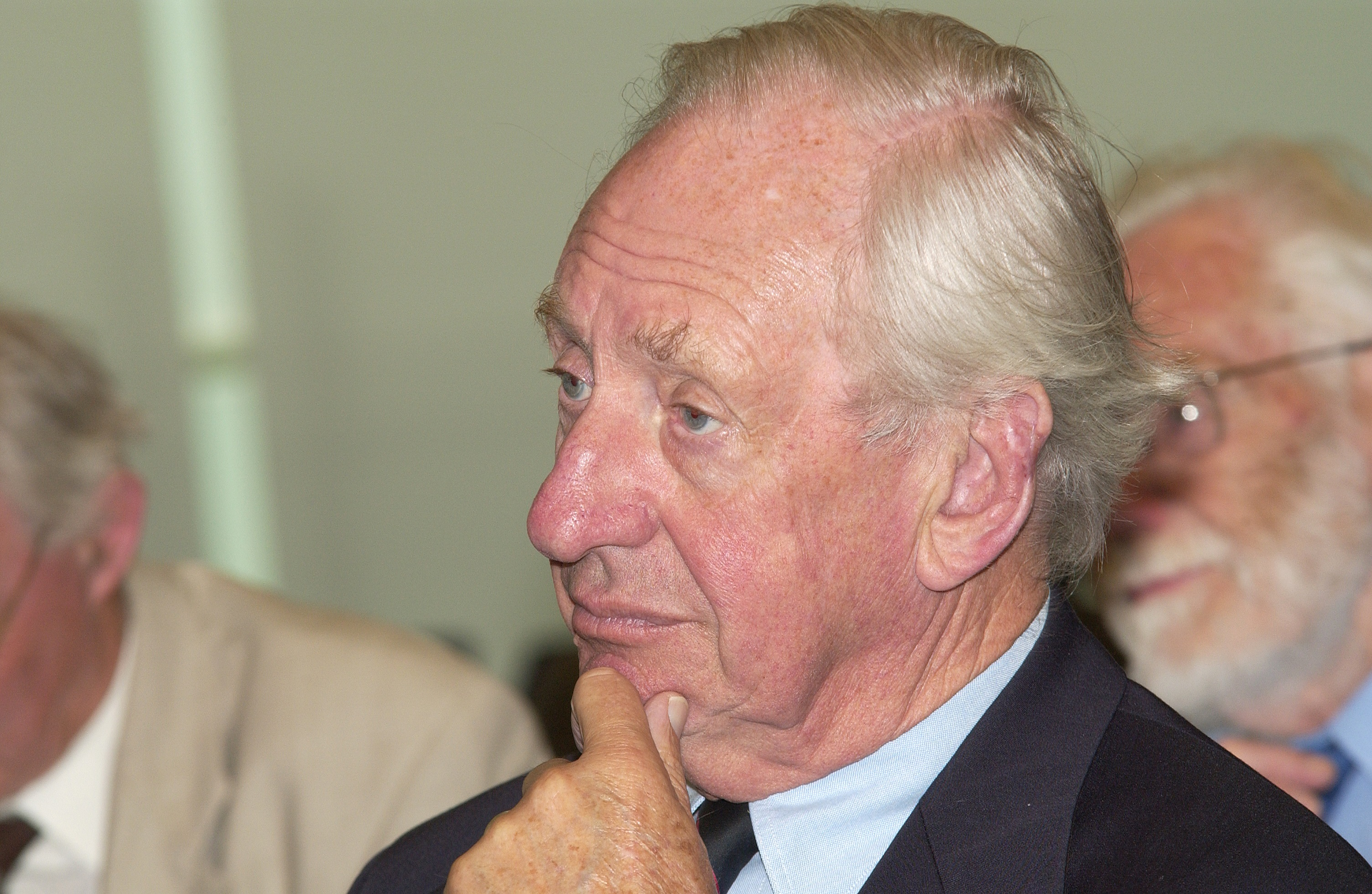
Old Red Professor John West

- Lionel Logue, CVO (1880–1953), speech therapist who successfully treated King George VI's stammer, portrayed in The King's speech
- George Eric Macdonnell Jauncey (1888–1947), physicist
- Peter Gordon Martin (1923–1994), botanist and geneticist
- Howard Rayner (1896–1975), doctor
- Brian Sando OAM (1936–2012), sports doctor for the Adelaide Football Club, Redlegs and Australian Olympics team.
- Arthur Edmund Shepherd (1867–1942), medical practitioner and army medical officer
- Julian Augustus Smith (1873–1947), surgeon and photographer
- Con Stough, Professor of Psychology – Swinburne University
- John Burnard West (1928– ), respiratory physiologist
- John Raymond Wilton (1884–1944), Elder Professor of Mathematics at the University of Adelaide.
- Traugott Bernhard Zwar (1876–1947), surgeon

== Military ==
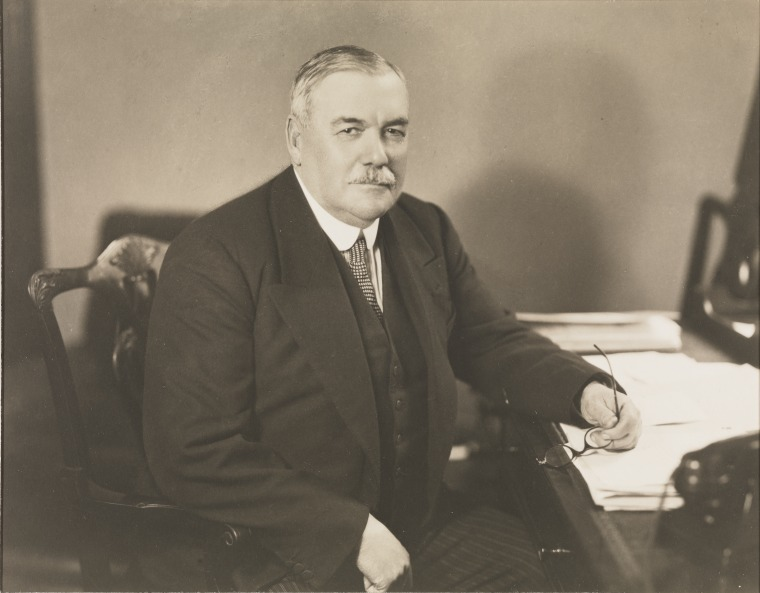
Old Red Sir Newton Moore, 8th Premier of Western Australia, 1932.

- Ronald Hubert Cox (1914–1992), air force officer and city inspector
- Major General Steve Gower AO (1940–), Director of the Australian War Memorial 1996–2011
- Ronald Beresford Lees (1910–1991), air force officer
- Major-General Sir Newton Moore KCMG (1870–1936), eighth Premier of Western Australia, World War I general, member of the UK House of Commons 1918–23, 1924–34.
- John Alexander Raws, journalist and WW1 diarist, killed in action 23 August 1916 at Pozieres – no known grave
- Lieutenant Leonard Taplin, DFC, World War fighter ace, pioneer aerial photographer and aerial cartographer
- Captain Hugo Vivian Hope Throssell, VC (1884–1933), soldier, farmer
- William Charles Nightingale Waite (1880–1973), soldier and auctioneer

== Sports ==
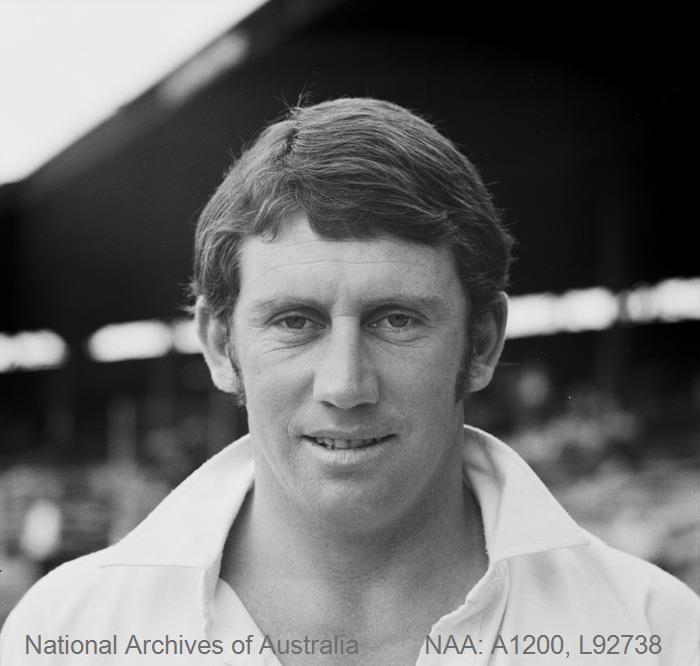
Old Red Ian Chappell, Australian Cricket Captain, 1971.

=== Cricket ===
- Greg Blewett (born 1971)
- Greg Chappell, MBE (born 1948), Australian captain 1975–1977, 1979–1983
- Ian Chappell (born 1943), Australian captain 1971–1975
- Trevor Chappell (born 1952)
- Joe Darling, CBE (1870–1946), Australian captain 1899–1902, 1902–1903, 1905
- Rick Darling (born 1957)
- Simon Douglas Fry (born 1966), umpire 2001–
- Clem Hill (1877–1945), Australian captain 1910–1912
- Tim May (born 1962)
- Howard Rayner (1896–1975)
- Paul Rofe (born 1981)
- James Smith (born 1988)
- Ashley Woodcock (born 1947)

=== Australian rules football ===
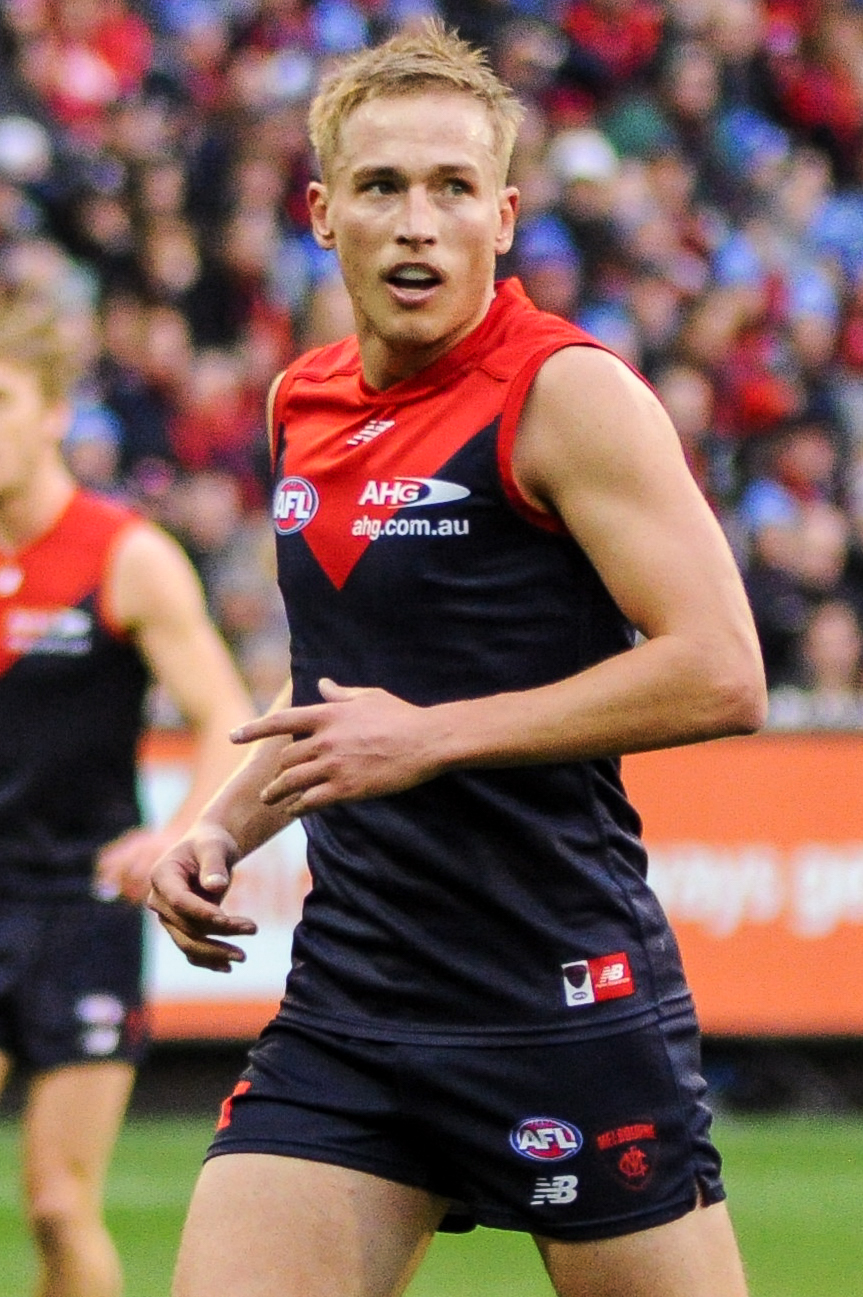
Old Red Bernie Vince playing for the Adelaide Crows, 2017

- Edward Charles Atkins (1873–1966) Norwood (SA Premiers 1894), Sturt, West Perth (WA Premiers 1897), East Fremantle (WA)
- Zac Bailey (1999–), Brisbane Football Club 2018– ; AFL premiership player 2024, 2025
- Kade Chandler (2000–), Melbourne Demons 2019–
- Riley Bonner (1997–), Port Adelaide Football Club 2016–2023 (93 games, 13 goals); St. Kilda Football Club 2024 (19 games, 1 goal); Total: 112 games, 14 goals
- James Borlase (2002–), Adelaide Crows 2021–
- Mitch Crowden (1999–), Fremantle Football Club 2018–2022 (42 games, 15 goals)
- Peter Dalwood, Norwood, Fitzroy 1945 (7 games, 12 goals), South Australia
- Peter Darley (1944–) South Adelaide (206 games); premiership winners 1964, captain 1967–1969, 1971; leading goalkicker 1974; 7 times best and fairest
- Rick Davies (1952–) South Australia (20 games, captain 1980); SANFL: Sturt (317), South Adelaide (33); VFL: Hawthorn 1981 (20 games, 37 goals)
- Sam Day (1992–), Gold Coast Suns 2011–2024 (155 games, 117 goals); Brisbane Lions 2025–; inaugural member of the Gold Coast Suns
- Aaron Francis (1997–), Essendon Football Club (35 games, 6 goals); Sydney Swans 2023–2025 (30 games, 6 goals); Total: 84 games, 18 goals
- George Hewett (1995–), Sydney Swans Football Club 2016–2021 (120 games, 32 goals); Carlton Blues 2022–
- Wayne Jackson (1944–), CEO of the AFL (1996–2003)
- Craig Kelly (1966–), Collingwood
- Ed Lower (1987–), North Melbourne Kangaroos 2006–2010 (42 games, 16 goals)

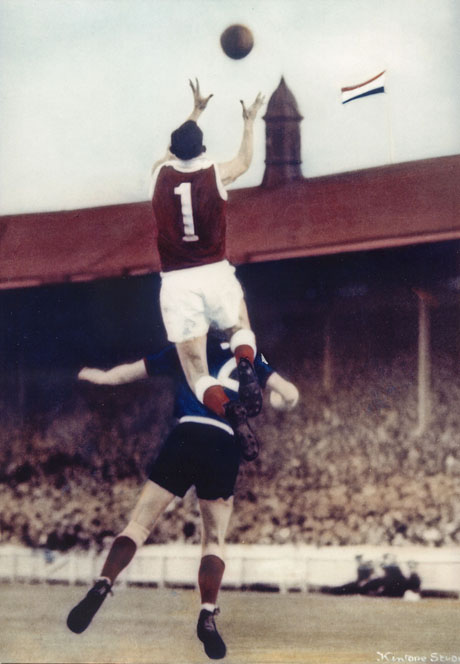
Old Red Ian McKay during the SANFL Grand Final, 1952

- Nick Lower (1987–), Port Adelaide 2006–2009 (20 games, 0 goals); Fremantle Dockers 2011–2012 (22 games, 9 goals); Western Bulldogs 2013 (13 games, 2 goals) – Total (55 games, 11 goals)
- Rodney Maynard (1966–), Adelaide Crows
- Kane McAuliffe (2005–) Richmond Football Club 2023–
- Ian McKay (1923–2010), North Adelaide (164 games, 45 goals, captain 1948–1955); South Australia (14 games, captain 1950–1951); 1950 Magarey Medalist
- John Mossop (1959–), Geelong 1979–1986 (134 games, 87 goals); North Melbourne 1987–1988 (37 games, 15 goals) – Total (171 games, 102 goals); Carji Greeves Medalist 1982
- Kysaiah Pickett (2001–), Melbourne Football Club 2020–; AFL premiership player 2021
- David Pittman (1969–), Adelaide Crows 1992–1999 (131 games, 34 goals); 2× AFL premiership player 1997, 1998
- Loch Rawlinson(2005–), West Coast Eagles 2023–
- Kym Russell (1968–), Collingwood Magpies 1991 (3 games, 1 goal)
- Scott Russell (1970–), Collingwood Magpies 1990–1998 (182 games, 107 goals); Sydney Swans 1999 (16 games, 8 goals) – Total (198 games, 115 goals); AFL premiership player 1990
- Luke Pedlar (2002–) Adelaide Crows 2021–
- Harry Schoenberg (2001–), Adelaide Football Club 2020–2025 (62 games, 22 goals); West Coast Eagles 2026-
- Tom Sparrow (2000–) Melbourne Football Club 2019–; AFL premiership player 2021
- Luke Tapscott (1991–), Melbourne Demons 2011–2014 (48 games, 12 goals)

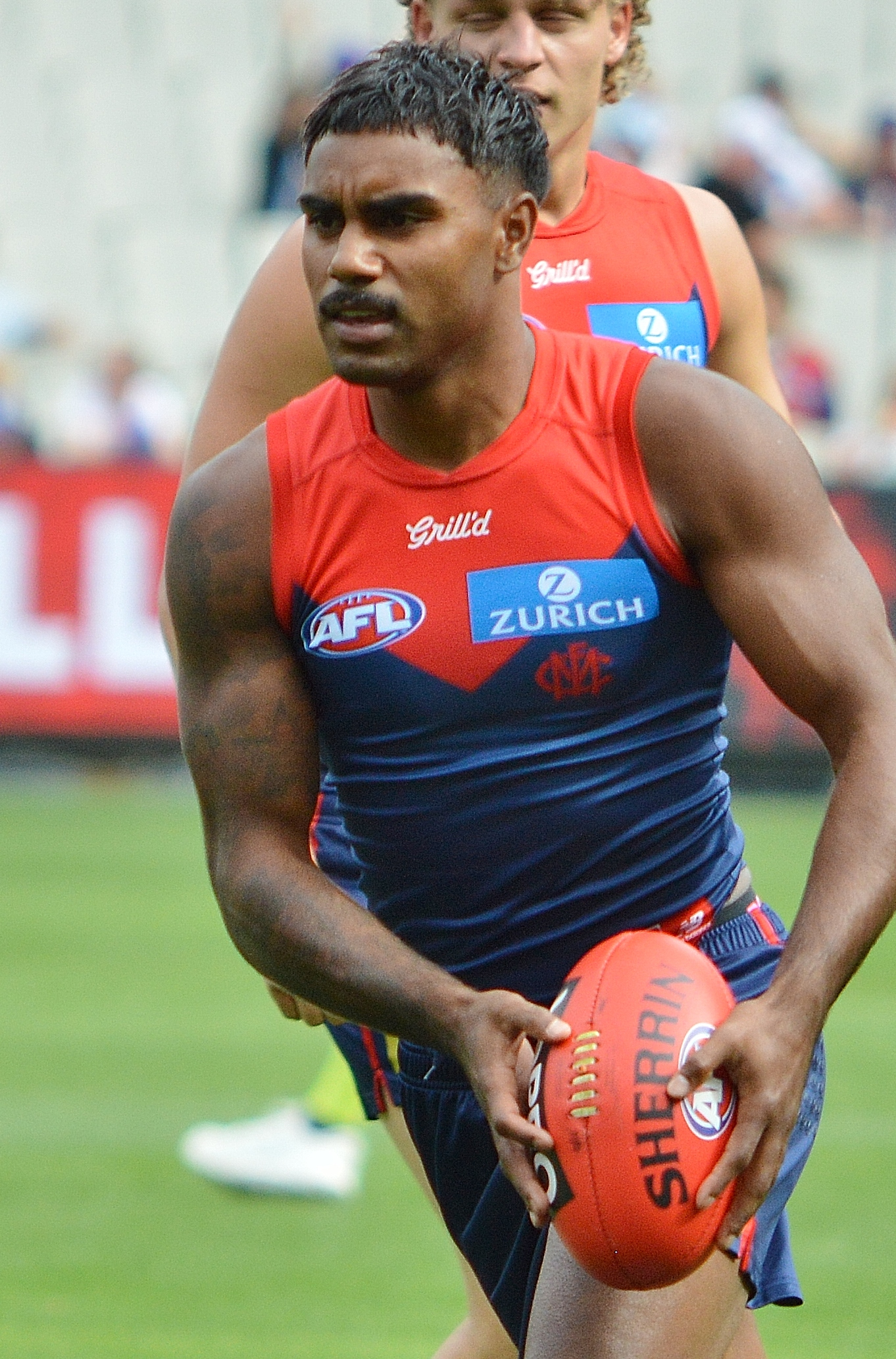
Old Red Kysaiah Pickett playing for the Melbourne Football Club

- Jack Trengove (1991–), Melbourne Demons (86 games, 39 goals, 2010–2017), captain of Melbourne FC (2012–2013), youngest captain in VFL/AFL history
- Bernie Vince (1985–), Adelaide Crows 2006–2013 (129 games, 80 goals) Melbourne Demons 2014–2018 (100 games, 33 goals) – Total (229 games, 113 goals); 2009 Malcolm Blight Medalist, 2015 Keith 'Bluey' Truscott Medalist
- Jack Viney (1994–), Melbourne Demons 2013– co-captain (2017–2019); AFL premiership player 2021; 2x Keith 'Bluey' Truscott Medalist 2016 & 2024
- Tim Weatherald (1977–) Sturt and Norwood Football Club (SANFL), Magarey Medallist 2002
- Tex Wanganeen (2003–) Essendon Football Club 2022–2024 (5 games, 1 goal)

=== Association football ===
- John Hall (1994–), Western Sydney Wanderers and Olyroos

=== Rowing ===
- Dr. Matthew Bolt (1986–), former Australian Under 23 Rower, stroke of the 2011 Bronze medal winning South Australian Kings Cup crew, member of 2012 Bronze medal winning Kings Cup crew, former Captain of Adelaide University Boat Club
- Alexander Hill (1993–), Current Australian Rowing Team member, Olympic Silver Medallist (Rio 2016) M4–, World Cup Medallist, Australian Under 23 Rower, 2011/2012 Bronze medal winning Kings Cup crew member, former Under 19 World Champion
- Brian Richardson (1947–2024), former Olympic Rower, Montreal 1976 and Moscow 1980

== Noted members of staff ==
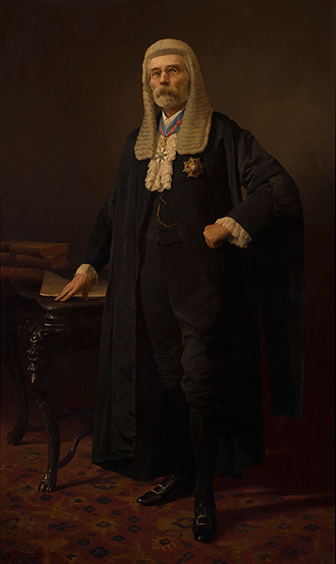
Old teacher Sir Frederick Holder, first Speaker of the House of Representatives, two-time Premier of South Australia.

=== Headmasters ===
- William Bayly (1867–1937)
- Frederic Chapple (1845–1924)
- John Anderson Hartley (1844–1896), (second headmaster, but first without supervision)
- John Frederick Ward (1883–1954) (also the history teacher)

=== Teachers ===
- James Ashton (1859–1935), art
- Sir Frederick William Holder (1850–1909)
- Heinrich Adolph Leschen (1836–1916), gymnastics
- Martin McKinnon (1975–), history
- Harold Edward Porter (1911–1984), English
- Richard Sanders Rogers (1861–1942), science
- Frederick William Wheatley (1871–1955), science and mathematics

=== Governors ===
- Arthur William Piper (1865–1936), judge
- Thomas Piper (1835–1928), clergyman

=== Foundation council ===
- William Geoffrey Gerard (1907–1994), businessman and philanthropist

=== Founders and early figures ===
- Sir John Colton (1823–1902), Premier of South Australia
- George Witherage Cotton (1821–1892), politician, land dealer and Christian Socialist
- Sir Thomas Elder (1818–1897), businessman, pastoralist and public benefactor
- Daniel Garlick (1818–1902), architect
- William McMinn (1844–1884), surveyor and architect
- T. G. Waterhouse (1811–1885), businessman, investor and philanthropist
- John Watsford (1820–1907), Wesleyan minister
