= 1928 SAAFL season =

1928 premiership season
- Date: 5 May - 15 September
- Teams: 13 from 12 clubs
- Premiers: League: Semaphore Central; A1: Semaphore Central; A2: Underdale United
- Minor premiers: A1: Semaphore Central; A2: Underdale United
- Wooden spooners: A1: Teachers' Training College; A2: St. Peter's O.C.
- Best and fairest: Les Webbe (Underdale United)
- Leading goalkicker: A1: 'Jogger' James (University) 74 Goals; A2: Mick Spain (Underdale) 107 Goals

The 1928 SAAFL season was the 14th season of the South Australian Amateur Football League (SAAFL).

The 1928 season commenced on 5 May and concluded on 15 September.

St. Peters Old Scholars were admitted this season, the rivalry between the Reds (Prince Alfred) and the Blues (St. Peters) is now able to be carried by the Old Reds (Prince Alfred OC) and the Old Blues (St. Peters OC). St. Augustine, who last season were Premiers of the United Church Football Association, were admitted. Underdale United, from Mid-Southern Association the previous season (West Torrens District Association prior), joined the SAAFL. University had a second team accepted into the competition. Marryatville, who had been in the SAAFL for two seasons, disbanded.

With the influx of teams, 13 teams from 12 clubs, the league decided to expand into two sections A1 (7 teams) and A2 (6 teams). With the addition of these new teams, new grounds were added into the competitions. Underdale's ground at West Park (next to Railways Oval, current Park 25); St. Augustine's ground at South Parklands on the left hand side of the Unley car line; and University B ground at Barton Terrace, North Adelaide (Current Park 2).

== A1 ==
Kenilworth, Univeristy A, Semaphore Central, South Adelaide Ramblers, Kingswood, Teacher's Training College, Henley & Grange.

=== Ladder ===
Pos	Team	Pld	W	L	D	Pts
1	Semaphore Central	12	10	1	1	21
2	Kenilworth	12	8	3	1	17
3	University	12	8	4	0	16
4	South Adelaide Ramblers	12	7	5	0	14
5	Henley and Grange	12	5	7	0	10
6	Kingswood	12	3	9	0	6
7	Teachers Training College	12	0	12	0	0

=== Finals ===
==== Semi Final ====
	Semi Finals
Saturday, 25 August	Semaphore Central 12.18	def.	University A 7.7	Prospect Oval
Saturday, 25 August	Kenilworth 10.11	def.	South Adelaide Ramblers 6.6	Thebarton Oval

==== Final ====
	Final
1 September	Semaphore Central 4.11	def. by	Kenilworth 8.6	Glenelg Oval

==== Challenge Final ====
	Challenge Final
Saturday, 8 September	Semaphore Central 10.13	def.	Kenilworth 4.11	Thebarton Oval

== A2 ==
Prince Alfred Old Collegians, Y.M.C.A., St. Augustine's, Underdale, St. Peter's Old Collegians, and University B.

=== Ladder ===
Pos	Team	Pld	W	L	D	Pts
1	Underdale United	12	12	0	0	24
2	St. Augustine	12	10	2	0	20
3	Prince Alfred Old Collegians	12	6	6	0	12
4	University B	12	4	8	0	8
5	Y.M.C.A	12	3	9	0	6
6	Saint Peters Old Collegians	12	1	11	0	2

=== Finals ===
==== Semi Final ====
	Semi Finals
Saturday, 11 August	Underdale United 20.20	v	Prince Alfred O.C. 4.7	Wayville Showground Oval
Saturday, 11 August	St. Augustine's 21.26	v	University B 2.3	Ramblers Ground

==== Final ====
	Final
Saturday, 25 August	Underdale United 9.13	def. by	St. Augustine 12.10	Glenelg Oval

==== Challenge Final ====
	Challenge Final
Saturday, 1 September	Underdale United 8.17 (65)	drew with	St. Augustine 9.11 (65)	Prospect Oval
The match was found that the scorecards did not match, therefore at a league meeting held on Tuesday 3 September, was decided the match would be replayed

==== Challenge Final Re-Play ====
	Challenge Final Re-play
Saturday, 8 September	Underdale United 9.15	def.	St. Augustine 5.14	Kenilworth Ground, South Park

== League Final ==
The Premiers of sections A1 (Semaphore Central) and A2 (Underdale United) played a final match on Saturday 15th September, with D. Busbridge the umpire.

The Final
Saturday, 15 September	Semaphore Central	def.	Underdale United	South Park
1.3; 4.10; 9.21; 14.23	Q1; Q2; Q3; Final	5.1; 7.1; 8.1; 10.13	Umpires: D. Busbridge
Maddern 6, O'Regan 4, Hales 2, Jones, Clark	Goals	Spain 4, Campbell 3, Gibaut, Hunter, Rule

== Representative ==
=== vs Metropolitan Amateur Football Association ===
SAAFL
B:	Charles Bridgman (Henley & Grange)	Bill Montgomery (Semaphore Central)	Henry Sincock (Henley & Grange)
HB:	CM Hampel (Semaphore Central)	Laurie Simon (St. Augustine)	Bert Mitchell (University)
C:	Jack Flood (St. Peters O.C.	Norm Walsh (Prince Alfred O.C.	Fred Jordan (South Adelaide Ramblers)
HF:	Keith McKenny (Y.M.C.A.)	Frank Gibaut (Semaphore)	Les Webber (Underdale)
F:	Bill Montgomery (Semaphore Central)	WR 'Jogger' James (University)	Les Wilke (Kingswood)
Foll:	Chris Sangster (cpt.) (University)		Gordon Beatty (Kenilworth)
Res:	L.N. Allan (Kingswood)	Ern O'Regan (Semaphore Central)	Len Salvemina (Semaphore Central)
Coach:	Hugh Millard		
Emg:	Reserve: Angus Forgie (Y.M.C.A.)		

King's Birthday Inter-State match
Monday, 4 June	SAAFL	def. by	MAFA	Unley Oval
4.3; 8.5; 9.7; 11.8 (74)	Q1; Q2; Q3; Final	1.6; 4.8; 9.12; 11.20 (86)	Umpires: D. Busbridge
James 7, Bridgman 2, Gibaut, Montgomery	Goals	Wilson 4, Law 3, Barnett 2, Oakley, McGrath
Sangster, Walsh, James, Mitchell, Montgomery	Best	Oakley, Gardiner, Law, Shaw, Barnett, Scott

=== vs Combined University (Adelaide and Melbourne Universities) ===
==== Team ====
Coach D. Busbridge

Player	Club
C. Barron	Kenilworth
Lionel Bridgland	St. Peters O.C.
HE Cook	Kingswood
K Howard	Kenilworth
Fred Jordan	South Adelaide Ramblers
Robert Kempster	South Adelaide Ramblers
Ken Maddern	Kenilworth
Bill Meathrel	Teachers Training College
FW Mitchell (cap.)	Teachers Training College
Bill Montgomery	Semaphore Central
Jack O'Connell	South Adelaide Ramblers
RJ O'Connor	University B
EW Richmond	Kingswood
Laurie Simon	St. Augustine
Edgar Sims	Prince Alfred O.C.
Keith Tuohy	St. Augustine
R Woolley	Kenilworth

Thursday, 16 August	Comb. Univ.	def.	SAAFL	University Oval
3.1; 7.4; 12.8; 16.12 (108)	Q1; Q2; Q3; Final	2.3; 7.4; 9.4; 10.7 (67)	Umpires: D. Busbridge
Cussen 4, Williams 3, James 2, Smith 2, Malcom 2, Booker, Hone, Finlayson	Goals	Sims 3, Kempster 2, O'Connor 2, Maddern, Meatnerel, Cook
Beckett, Cussen, Williams, King, Scharp, Booker, Smith	Best	Jordan, Sims, Montgomery, Mitchell, Woolley, Main, Richmond

=== vs Port Pirie Football Association ===
Team

SAAFL
B:	Jack O'Connell (South Adelaide Ramblers)	Bill Montgomery (Semaphore Central)	Ron McDougall (St. Augustine)
HB:	A. Kean (Henley & Grange)	A. L. Mitchell (University A)	L. L. Simon (St. Augustine)
C:	F. Jordan (South Adelaide Ramblers)	H. W. Main (v.c.) (Kenilworth)	S. Milne (Kingswood)
HF:	E. R. Masters (St. Augustine)	F. Gilbaut (Semaphore Central)	W. Kempster (South Adelaide Ramblers)
F:	J. Smith (Kenilworth)	K. L. Maddern (Capt.) (Semaphore Central)	A. S. Parry (Henley & Grange)
Foll:	C. M. Hampel (Semaphore Central)	L. M. Salvemina (Semaphore Central)	R. J. O'Connell (University B)
Res:	F. Trevaskis (Henley & Grange)	K. Meffer (Kenilworth)	
Coach:	H. J. Richards (secretary of Kenilworth)		

Saturday, 18 August	Port Pirie Football Association	def.	SAAFL	Memorial Oval, Port Pirie
7.2; 7.6; 8.14; 8.14 (62)	Q1; Q2; Q3; Final	0.4; 3.9; 3.9; 6.5 (51)	Umpires: L.P. Sandery
Clarke 4, Scott 2, Boundy, Waters	Goals	Maddern 2, Kempster, O'Connor, Salvemina, Smith
Boundy, Easson, Clarke, Pritchard, Lambe, Leahey, Sharp, McKay, Telford	Best	Salvemina, Hampel, Montgomery, Masters, Parry
