= John Lawton =

John Lawton may refer to:

- John Lawton (1656–1736), thrice Member of Parliament for Newcastle-under-Lyme
- John Lawton (died 1740) (c. 1700 – 1740), Member of Parliament for Newcastle-under-Lyme
- John Lawton (priest) (1913–1995), English cleric; Archdeacon of Warrington
- John Lawton (footballer) (1936–2017), English footballer
- John Lawton (singer) (1946–2021), British rock and blues vocalist
- John Lawton (biologist) (born 1943), British ecologist
- John Lawton (author) (born 1949), television producer and director, and author
- John William Magarey Lawton (born 1939), Australian immunologist
