= William Douglas Allen =

Physicist and electrical engineer

William Douglas Allen (27 July 1914 – 7 May 2008) was a physicist and electrical engineer.

Allen was born on 27 July 1914 in Mussooree, British India. He was educated in South Australia at Prince Alfred College and the University of Adelaide, where he received a BSc (Hons) in 1935. In 1937, he was awarded a Rhodes Scholarship to New College, Oxford, where he completed a D.Phil. in 1940.

== Career ==
From 1935 to 1937, Allen worked as a "Junior Demonstrator" in the Department of Physics of the University of Adelaide before proceeding to Oxford as a Rhodes Scholar.

During the war, he completed his D.Phil. and from 1939 to 1944 worked as a scientific officer at the UK Ministry of Aircraft Production's Telecommunications Research Establishment. In 1944 he moved to the US to work as a scientific officer on the Manhattan Project.

In 1946 he returned to Australia to work at the CSIR (Council for Scientific and Industrial Research) Radiophysics Laboratory in Sydney. However, later in 1946 he returned to Britain and commenced a 30-year career as a physicist in the UK. From 1946 to 1961, he worked at the Atomic Energy Research Establishment in Harwell, and from 1961 to 1977, at the Rutherford High Energy Laboratory.

In 1966 he became professor of engineering at the University of Reading. He retired from Rutherford in 1977, and Reading in 1978, and took on the roles of visiting professor: 1978–79 he was visiting professor of physics at the University of the West Indies, Barbados, and 1979–81 he was visiting professor of electrical engineering at the University of Southampton, UK.

== Publications ==
- Some observations on the interface of mercury against water and aqueous solutions, with R.S. Burdon & J.W. Lillywhite, Australian and New Zealand Association for the Advancement of Science. Report of the Meeting., 23 (Auckland, 1937), 19.
- Spreading with uniform acceleration, with K. Grant & R.S. Burdon, Faraday Society, London. Transactions., 33 (1937), 1531–1532.
- Neutron detection, W.D. Allen, London : George Newnes, [c1960].
- Gravitational radiation experiments at the University of Reading and the Rutherford Laboratory, with C. Christodoulides, J. Phys. A: Math. Gen., 8 (1975), 1726–33.

== Scholarships ==
- 1935 The John L. Young Scholarship
- 1937 Rhodes Scholarship

== Sources ==
- Allen, William Douglas (1914 – ), Bright Sparcs
- 'Allen, William Douglas', in Physics in Australia to 1945, R.W. Home, with the assistance of Paula J. Needham, Australian Science Archives Project, June 1995, http://www.asap.unimelb.edu.au/bsparcs/physics/P001585p.htm.
- William Douglas Allen's obituary
