= Howard Rayner =

Australian cricketer, Australian rules football player and medical doctor

Personal information
- Full name: Howard Luscombe Rayner
- Born: 12 March 1896; Glenelg, South Australia, Australia
- Died: 13 June 1975 (aged 79); Twickenham, London, England
- Nickname: Rats
- Height: 5 ft 6 in (1.68 m)

Career statistics
Competition	First-class
Matches	1
Runs scored	23
Batting average	23.00
100s/50s	0/0
Top score	21*
Catches/stumpings	1/–
- Source: Cricinfo, 26 August 2019

Howard Luscombe Rayner (12 March 1896 – 13 June 1975) was an Australian first-class cricketer, Australian rules footballer and medical doctor.

Rayner was the son of religious parents, his father was a Methodist minister and his mother was a missionary in Fiji. Born at Adelaide, he was educated in the city at Prince Alfred College, before going up to the University of Adelaide to study medicine, where he gained a first class degree. A keen sportsman, having captained the Prince Alfred College cricket team, he proceeded to play Australian rules football for Sturt Football Club as a half forward flanker, making one senior appearance for the club in the 1915 South Australian Football League. He was the University of Adelaide's Rhodes Scholar for 1916, but did not travel to England to take up his scholarship at Balliol College, Oxford until 1918.

After arriving in England, he briefly served in the Royal Navy prior to the signing of the Armistice in November 1918. Following the armistice he returned to Balliol College and continued his medical training at King's College Hospital. The following year, he made a single appearance in first-class cricket for P. F. Warner's XI against Oxford University at Oxford. Batting twice in the match, he was dismissed for 2 runs in the P. F. Warner's XI first-innings by Vyvyan Pearse, while in their second-innings he scored 21 unbeaten runs. Rayner graduated from Oxford in 1921, entering general practice at Twickenham in 1923 and practicing medicine in Twickenham throughout the 1920s and 1930s, before changing specialities in 1938 to become an anaesthetist at St John's Hospital.

During World War II he oversaw the medical conversion of the Orleans School and Twickenham Stadium, overseeing the latter throughout the war. Following the war, he was appointed as the doctor to the Rugby Football Union, as well as returning to his position as an anaesthetist at St John's, where he remained until two years after his official retirement in 1965. Later in life he took up golf and served as the president of Fulwell Golf Course. Rayner died at Twickenham in June 1975 and was survived by his wife.
