= Norman Jolly =

Personal information
- Full name: Norman William Jolly
- Born: 5 August 1882; Mintaro, South Australia
- Died: 18 May 1954 (aged 71); Adelaide, South Australia
- Original team: Prince Alfred College

Playing career^{1}
Years	Club	Games (Goals)
1899–1900	Norwood	14 (0)
1901–1902	Sturt	24 (25)

Representative team honours
Years	Team	Games (Goals)
1900–1902	South Australia	4
- ^{1} Playing statistics correct to the end of 1902.

Norman Jolly
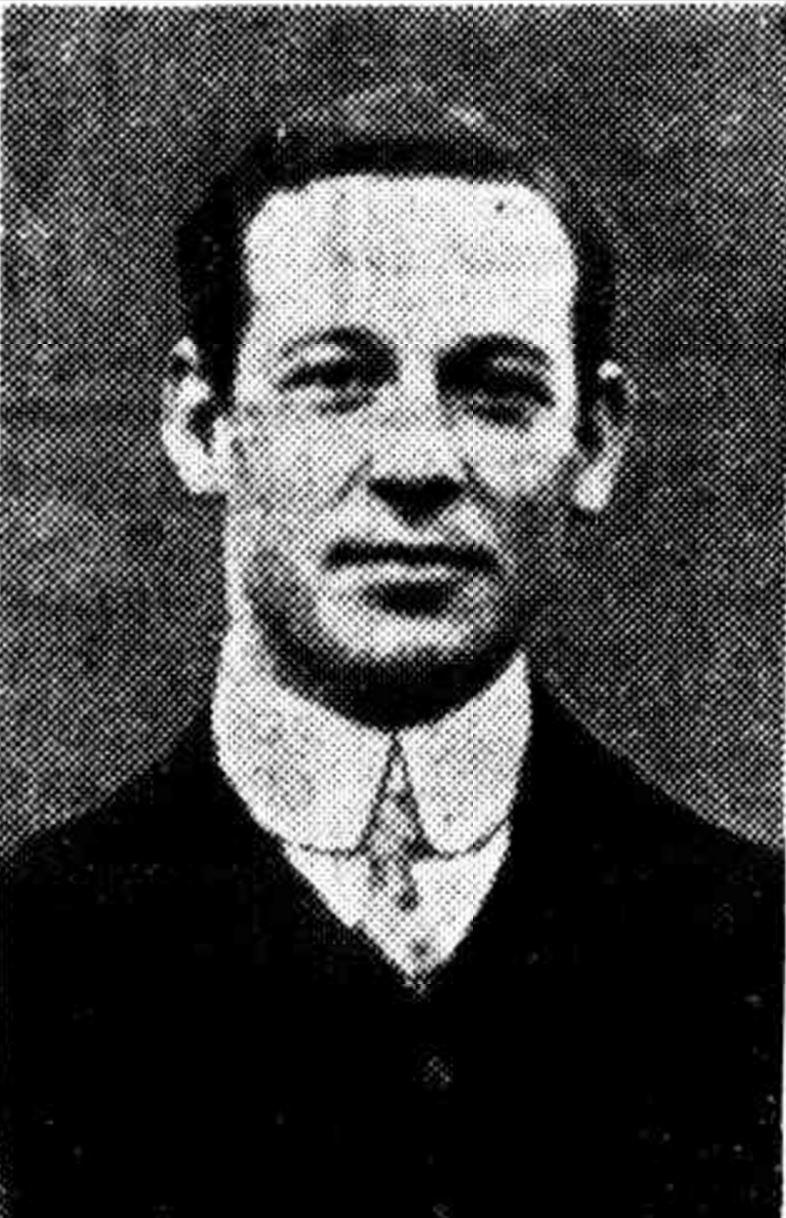
- Jolly in 1924

Cricket information
- Role: Wicket-keeper

Career statistics
Competition	First-class
Matches	1
Runs scored	9
Batting average	9.00
100s/50s	0/0
Top score	8
Catches/stumpings	3/0
- Source: Cricinfo, 29 August 2020

Norman William Jolly (5 August 1882 – 18 May 1954) was a first-class cricketer and forester. He was South Australia's first Rhodes Scholar.

== Early life ==
Norman William Jolly was born on 5 August 1882 in Mintaro, South Australia, the son of storekeeper Henry Dickson Jolly and Annie (née Lathlean). He attended Prince Alfred College and the University of Adelaide, graduating with a Bachelor of Science (BSc).

In 1904, Jolly was the first South Australian to be chosen for a Rhodes Scholarship, attending Balliol College, Oxford. After graduating B.A. from Oxford with a first in natural science in 1907, Jolly studied under (Sir) William Schlich, and briefly in Europe, to obtain the Oxford diploma of forestry.

== Sport ==
Jolly was also a leading sporting figure in Adelaide. He played in the South Australian Grade Cricket League, rowed in the Adelaide university eight and played for the Norwood Football Club and Sturt Football Club in the South Australian National Football League (SANFL), representing South Australia three times. While living in England in 1907, Jolly played one first-class cricket match, for Worcestershire against Oxford University. Batting at number 11, he scored eight and one not out, and from behind the stumps he picked up three catches, the first being that of Oxford captain Egerton Wright.

== Forestry ==
Jolly joined the Indian Forest Service in Burma in 1907 but returned to Australia in 1909 to teach at Geelong Church of England Grammar School. In July 1910 he was appointed inaugural headmaster of Perth Modern School in Western Australia, but resigned in September to take up a position of instructor in forestry for the South Australian Department of Woods and Forests, where he founded the first course in Australia in higher forestry training. From 1911 to 1918, he was Director of Forestry in Queensland, and then became Commissioner of Forests in New South Wales. In 1925 he became the first Professor in Forestry at Adelaide University.

== Later life ==
Jolly retired in 1933 as his health was impaired. He died on 18 May 1954 aged 71 in Adelaide.

== Legacy ==
In 1957, a memorial grove of trees (Eucalyptus microcorys) and a cairn were established on Moonpar Forest Drive, Nymboi Binderay National Park, Dorrigo, New South Wales, commemorating Jolly's contributions to teaching and practice of forestry.

The Norman Jolly Medal was founded by the Institute of Foresters of Australia (IFA) after Jolly's death and is the highest and most prestigious honour for outstanding service or contribution to forestry in Australia.
