= Roger Opie =

Australian-born economist

Roger Gilbert Opie CBE (1927–1998) was an Australian-born economist, Rhodes Scholar, distinguished Oxford academic, economic advisor to the UK Treasury, the West Pakistan Planning Commission and the International Labour Organisation, and appeared regularly on BBC TV's "The Money Show".

Opie was born on 23 February 1927 in Adelaide, South Australia where he attended Prince Alfred College on a scholarship (1939–1944) and the University of Adelaide (1945–1951) – BA 1949, MA 1951 – winning many prizes.

He was elected as South Australia's Rhodes Scholar in 1951 and studied at Christ Church, Oxford, living the rest of his life in the UK.

After graduating from Oxford in 1953, he lectured at the London School of Economics until 1961, and from then until his retirement in 1992, at New College, Oxford, where he was also a Fellow.

He died in Oxford on 22 January 1998. He was survived by his wife, three children and five grandchildren.
