= John William Magarey Lawton =

Australian immunologist and musician (born 1939)

John William Magarey Lawton (born 24 April 1939) is an Australian immunologist and musician who had a career in Hong Kong.

== Early life ==
Lawton was born in Adelaide, to Edgar Vincent Lawton and Kathleen Elsie Lawton, née Magarey, of 3 Hilda Terrace, Hawthorn, South Australia. He grew up in comfortable surroundings in a close, musical, church-going family, and was educated at Prince Alfred College, where he was a prize-winning student. He studied violin, gaining a Gladys Lloyd Thomas scholarship in 1954, and was a member of the South Australian Symphony Orchestra.

== Medical career ==
He studied medicine at the University of Adelaide, graduating Bachelor of Medicine and Bachelor of Science in 1963, working as a resident medical officer at the Queen Elizabeth Hospital 1963–1964 and the Adelaide Children's Hospital 1964–1965. He worked as a research fellow, University of Adelaide 1965–1967. He continued his studies, gaining his Doctor of Medicine in 1968 and worked as registrar at Royal Adelaide Hospital 1968–1970. He left for America, gaining further research experience at the department of microbiology, University of Michigan, Ann Arbor, 1970–1972, then spent three years at the Royal Infirmary, Edinburgh as senior registrar, haematology and blood transfusion. It was here he admitted to MRCP.

He emigrated to Hong Kong in 1975 as senior lecturer in Pathology from 15 September 1975 with the pathology department, University of Hong Kong.

By 1984, he was a professor at HKU.

Since 2004, Lawton retired and returned to Australia to live in Adelaide.

== Personal life ==
When in Hong Kong, he was learning to speak Chinese.

Lawton was father to four children.
