= Eric Smart =

Sir Eric Fleming Smart OBE (12 October 1911 – 10 June 1973) was a Western Australian wheat-farmer, grazier, and local government councillor. His innovation achieved record grain and wool yields; he also pioneered modern agricultural methods for fertilisation and pest control. Smart was knighted in 1966 for outstanding service to agriculture.

== Early life ==
Smart was born at Narridy, South Australia, on 12 October 1911 to farmer Percival Horace Smart and his wife Lilian Louise, née Rogers. He was their third child. Smart attended Washpool Public School, and Adelaide's Prince Alfred College as a boarder. As an 18-year-old Smart was sharefarming, and had a salt delivery business.

== Farming and innovation in Western Australia ==
With savings of £200, Smart moved to Western Australia in 1934 to a share farming opportunity at Watheroo. Despite the tough economic conditions, he grew his farming business throughout the Wheatbelt. Smart moved to Wongan Hills in 1940, where he purchased a 10,000-acre (4,000 ha) station. He bought 25,000 acres (10,000 ha) at Mingenew in 1946, later increasing the size to 80,000 acres (32,000 ha) by buying unimproved land. Smart also leased an additional 7,000 acres (2,800 ha).

Smart increased soil fertility through the planting of the Western Australian blue lupin, which would thrive in sandy conditions if superphosphates were used. Lupin had previously known for being sown in red soils near Geraldton and Gingin to feed sheep. Smart was supportive of scientific research and allowed trials to occur at his property Erregulla Springs. Agricultural practices developed included introducing clovers after initial fertility increases, to increase productivity; pest control through aerial insect spraying; and using nitrogen to fertilise cereals. As of the 2010s, those techniques are still in use in modern farming.

Smart was visited by representatives of the United States wheat industry in 1963. By this time he was the largest individual grain producer in the world. Smart travelled to the eastern states of Australia, visiting agricultural society shows, colleges, and other public events to publicise his achievements and Western Australia's opportunities.

Smart was appointed O.B.E. in 1955, and was knighted in 1966 for his outstanding services to agriculture. Smart retired in 1966 due to his deteriorating health.

== Personal life and other roles ==
Smart married Jean Constance Davis on 15 September 1938, at Adelaide's Pirie Street Methodist Church. They had a son and two daughters.

Smart authored a booklet West Australian Wasteland Transformed in 1960, in which he explained his techniques and philosophy.

He served several terms in local governments: Wongan-Ballidu Road Board from 1947 to 1949, Mingenew Road Board from 1950 to 1956 and from 1958 to 1960, and the renamed Mingenew Shire Council from 1961 to 1967.

Smart died on 10 June 1973 from a coronary occlusion, at his home in Dalkeith. He was cremated with Anglican rites.

== Legacy ==
Smart bequeathed $200,000 to the University of Western Australia to continue his research, focusing on the use of lupins on land in the West Midlands. The university's Sir Eric Smart Scholarship is funded from Smart's bequest and a donation from his son Peter, and as of December 2019 had supported 20 students.

Smart was recognised as one of the most influential Western Australian businessmen in The West Australian's 2013 list of the 100 most influential.
