= Robert Gerard =

Australian businessman (born 1945)

Robert Geoffrey Gerard AO (born 3 January 1945) is an Australian businessman. He has been Chairman of the family company Gerard Industries Pty Ltd, and a member of the Reserve Bank of Australia, and ran for the leadership of the Liberal party in 1987. He was born and grew up in Adelaide, and attended Prince Alfred College.

== Philanthropy ==
Gerard is a noted South Australian philanthropist. He is a Founder Member of the Quarter Club, which raises over $250,000 per annum for Australian Olympic, Paralympic and Commonwealth Games athletes. Robert is a major supporter of The Duke of Edinburgh's International Award - Australia and in 2016 he was awarded a Gold Distinguished Service Medal. Robert served as a national Board director and SA Chair (2002 - 2012) and President of the Friends of The Duke of Edinburgh's Award from 1997 - 2001

== Family history ==
Robert's grandfather Alfred Gerard established the Clipsal brand in Adelaide in 1920. Under the nearly 50 years of leadership by Geoff Gerard (Alfred's son and Robert's father), the business made several manufacturing breakthroughs and expanded. Robert Gerard took over leadership in 1976, and expanded the business throughout Australia and South-east Asia, and into Hong Kong, India, South Africa, the UK and Russia.

By 2003, Gerard Industries was 50:50 owned by the Gerard family and the Singapore-listed Clipsal Industries Holdings (CIH). It was also still involved in a 14-year dispute with the Australian Taxation Office (ATO).

Requiring funds to "repay debt, build new businesses and let the Clipsal brand grow globally", in 2004 the Gerard family "opted to sell its stake to the French company Schneider Electric, as a sharemarket float did not look an attractive option". The family has retained control of "a raft of other businesses accumulated over the years".

Simon Gerard is the son of Robert Gerard, and was appointed chief executive officer of Gerard Lighting in 2010

== Reserve Bank board appointment ==
In March 2003, Robert Gerard was appointed to the Board of the Reserve Bank by the Federal Treasurer (of the then governing Liberal Party), Peter Costello. He resigned on 2 December 2005 amidst questions about a 14-year dispute between his family's business, Gerard Industries, and the Australian Taxation Office.

Prior to Gerard's appointment, the treasurer had required Gerard to produce evidence that he had no outstanding taxation issues. The letter produced stated that Gerard had no outstanding personal taxation issues. However, it did not mention outstanding business taxation issues. Some, including the then Opposition Labor Party's Treasury Spokesman, Wayne Swan, charged that his original appointment to the board was politically motivated, citing Mr. Gerard's generous donations to the Liberal Party, in particular his donations to the state Liberal party in South Australia.

Since Gerard's resignation, his donations to the party have ceased, allowing for only the most basic of election campaigns at the 2006 South Australian election.

== Nuclear industrial development ==
In December 2016, Rob Gerard was one of a group of 21 prominent South Australians to sign an open letter to the Government of South Australia, which called to keep discussions open regarding the potential establishment of storage and disposal facilities for international spent nuclear fuel in South Australia. The group's letter supported the recommendations of the 2015-16 Nuclear Fuel Cycle Royal Commission, but not the vote of the subsequent Citizen's Jury which rejected the pursuit of the nuclear waste storage proposition by a majority vote.
