= T. G. Waterhouse =

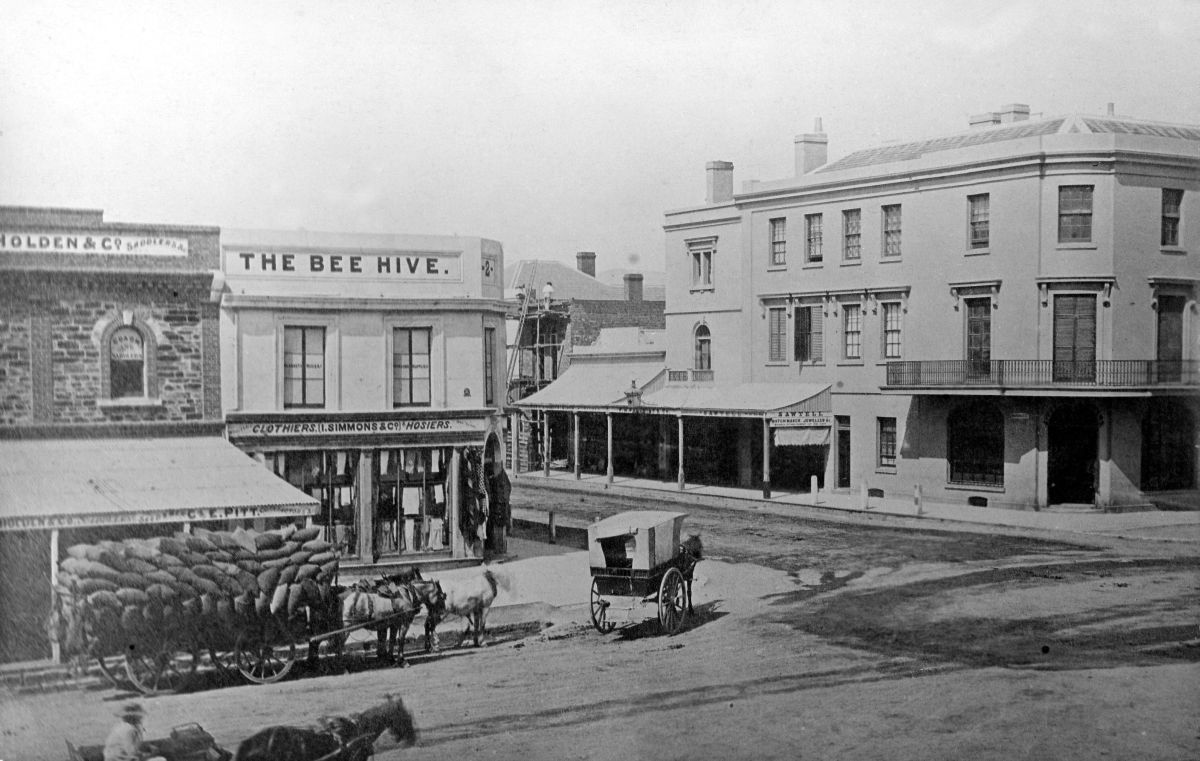
Waterhouse Chambers, Adelaide 1866

Thomas Greaves Waterhouse JP (22 January 1811, Conisborough, Yorkshire – 9 October 1885, London) was a businessman, investor and philanthropist in early colonial South Australia arriving soon after the start of official settlement. He was one of the early shareholders of the Burra Burra Mine, and for a long time held a seat on the Directorate. He was also involved in the establishment of the Bank of Adelaide.

== Biography ==
T. G. Waterhouse was born on 22 January 1811 in Conisborough, Yorkshire. Aged 29, he came to the colony of South Australia (established in 1836), on the Lysander, landing at Port Adelaide on 6 September 1840.

He and his brother John ran a successful grocery business at the southern corner of King William Street and Rundle Street, dubbed "Waterhouse's Corner", the other side of Rundle Street (now Rundle Mall) being the veteran Beehive Corner. Adelaide's oldest shop (founded 1847) is Waterhouse Chambers at 42-46 King William Street. After twenty years in the colony he retired from business in 1861. Following his retirement, his affairs were managed by his eldest son Arthur.

A member of the Wesleyan Church, he devoted one-tenth of his income to the causes of charity and religion, and did not confine his benevolence to his own Church, extending it to all charitable objects and the assistance of struggling men.

He and his wife returned to England in 1868. Prior to their departure for England, Mr & Mrs Waterhouse were given a farewell breakfast in the Pirie Street Wesleyan Lecture Hall; the Chairman of the District, the Rev. John Watsford, presided. Watsford made special mention of Mrs Waterhouse. "He" (Watsford) "held that the gentleman should hold the reins, but the good wife would always sit by his side, and make him drive just where she chose. (Renewed laughter)"

In December 1885 the Wallaroo Times reported that "the late Mr. T. G. Waterhouse's property in England will be proved at one million and a quarter sterling" but in February 1886 it was reported his will dated 23 May 1883 had been sworn at under £493,000.

== Philanthropy ==
Waterhouse was one of the early shareholders of the successful and highly lucrative Burra Burra Mine which made fortunes for a number of the early settlers of the colony, and kept the colony solvent through several droughts and recessions. As merchants, he and his brother's grocery business was also successful. At the time of the exodus to the Victorian gold rush 1851–56 T. G. invested heavily in land in the Adelaide city centre, and subsequently continued to increase his holdings so that, by the time of his death, a considerable proportion of the city's freehold land belonged to his estate. The ensuing rapid rise in land values greatly increased the size of his already large fortune.

As a member of the Wesleyan Methodist Church he was a very generous contributor to their causes. The Waterhouse wing of the main building of Prince Alfred College, added in 1877, was named in his honour.

== Waterhouse House ==
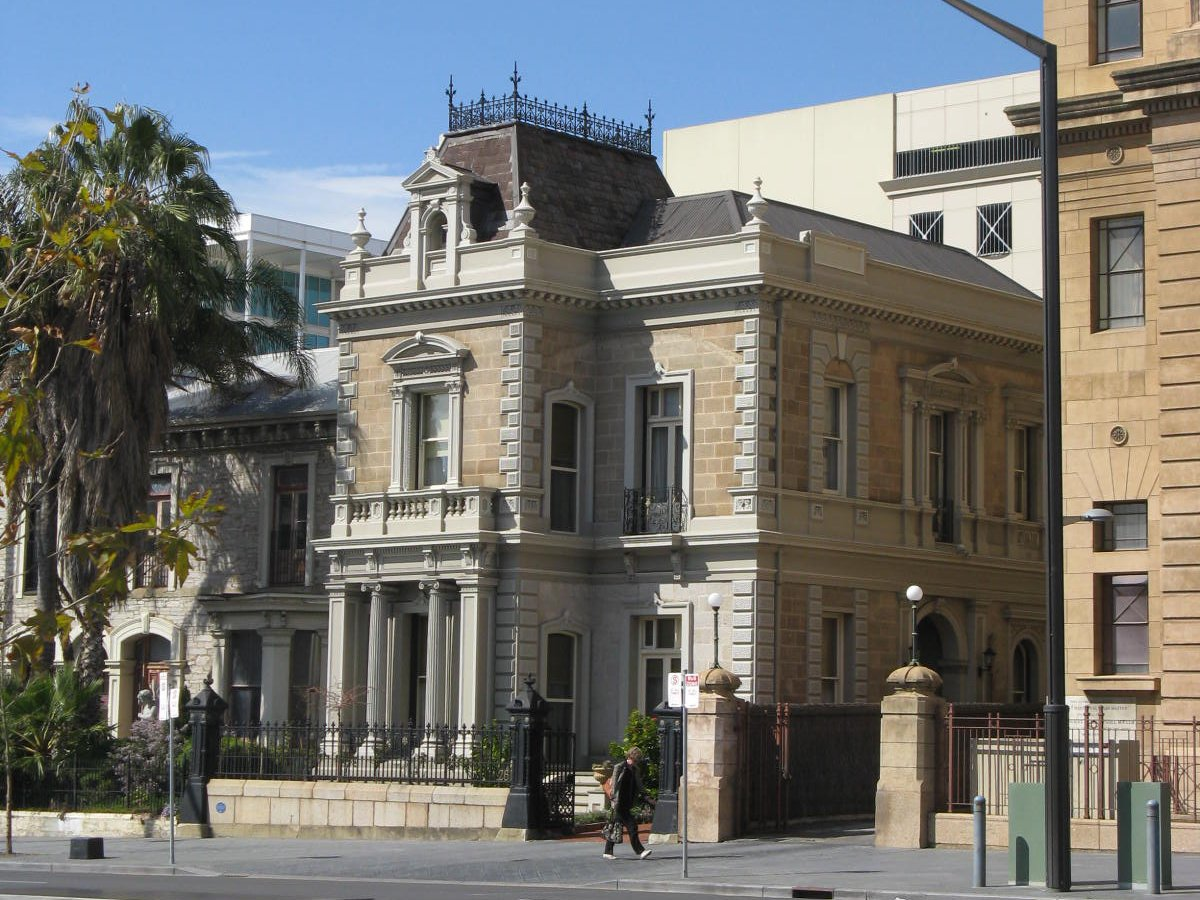

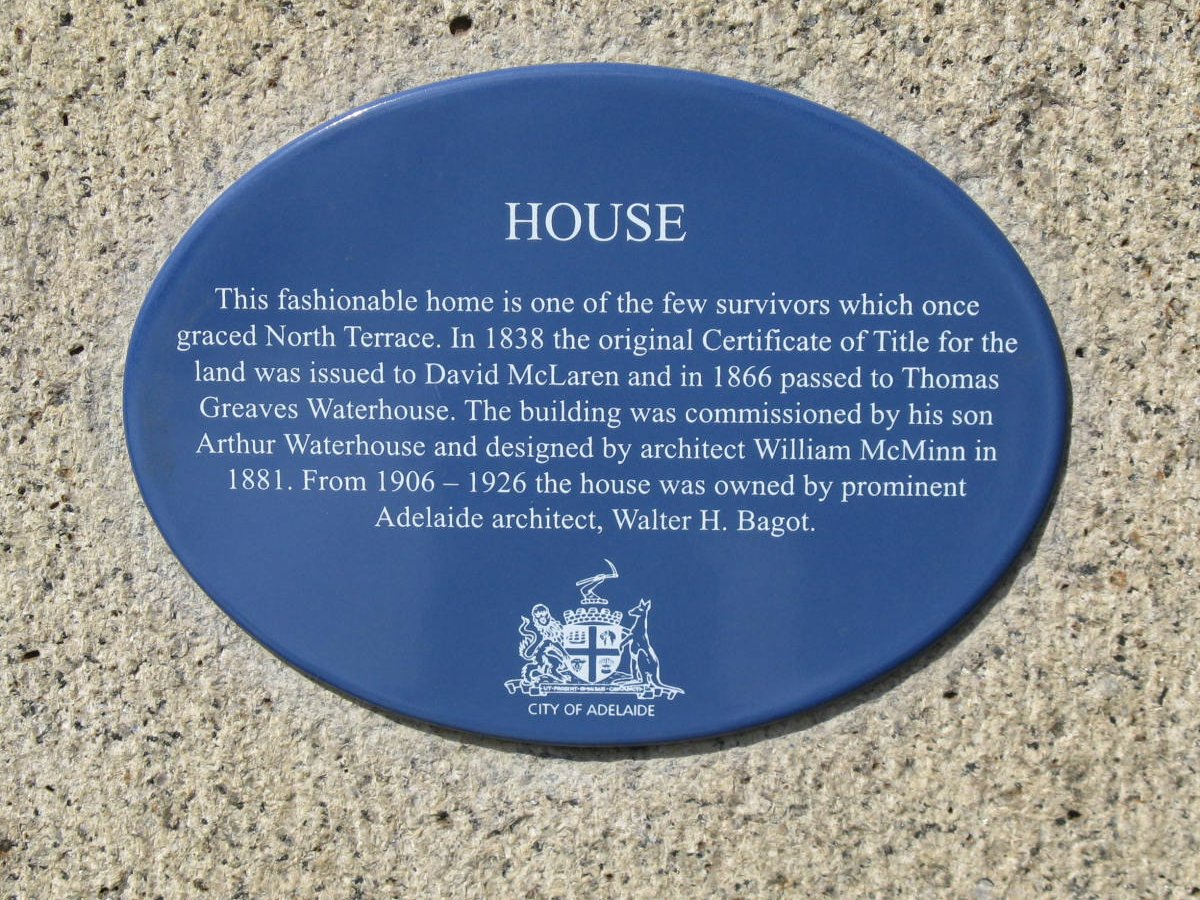

He and his son Arthur are commemorated by the "Waterhouse House" on North Terrace, Adelaide.

- In 1838, the original Certificate of title was issued to David McLaren.
- In 1866 the title passed to T. G. Waterhouse.
- The building was commissioned by T. G.'s son Arthur, and designed by William McMinn, in 1881.
- The property was owned by Walter H. Bagot from 1906 to 1926.

== Descendants ==
He married Eliza Faulding (1824 – 2 February 1907), a sister of Francis Hardey Faulding at Trinity Church, Adelaide on 25 August 1852. They had five children:

- Emily, who married also Adelaide-born London businessman Alfred Bentley and lived in Hampstead, London NW8. They had nine surviving children:
  - Her youngest son, engineer W. O. Bentley (Walter Owen, 1888-1971) with his Chartered Accountant brother, H M Bentley, established the business and designed and built the cars which won at Le Mans five times between 1924 and 1930.
- Arthur, who married a daughter of Sir William Morgan, and lived in Adelaide;
- Clara, who did not live to adulthood;
- Leonard, who also moved to England from Australia; and
- Walter, who married a daughter of Mr. T. Fotheringham, of Gawler, and then moved to England.
