= John Anderson Hartley =

Australian educator

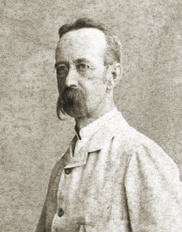
- Born: 27 August 1844; Brentford
- Died: 15 September 1896 (aged 52); Adelaide
- Occupation: Educator

John Anderson Hartley (27 August 1844 – 15 September 1896) was an Australian educator and Vice Chancellor of the University of Adelaide from 1893 to 1896.

== Education ==
Hartley was educated at Woodhouse Grove School, Yorkshire from 1853 to1860. He later went on to teach at the school until 1867. He graduated with a Bachelor of Arts in 1867 and Bachelor of Science in 1870, both from the University of London.

== Career ==
In 1870 Hartley was appointed Headmaster of Prince Alfred College in Adelaide, emigrating to South Australia with his wife. Soon after, in 1871, he was appointed to the Central Board of Education, which oversaw the administration of the colony's public schools.

In 1875, the Education Act of 1875 was passed, introducing a free public school system and compulsory education for South Australian children aged 7 to 13, as well as establishing the first Council of Education, of which Hartley was appointed President.

He was appointed the first Inspector-General of Schools for South Australia in 1878, a position he held up to his death in 1896.

Hartley died in September 1896 as the result of an accident and collision with a horse in Adelaide whilst riding home on his bicycle. His funeral procession was led by six headmasters and 3,000 children.

== Family ==
Hartley married Elizabeth Annie Green, sister-in-law of headmaster Rev. Robert Crooke.

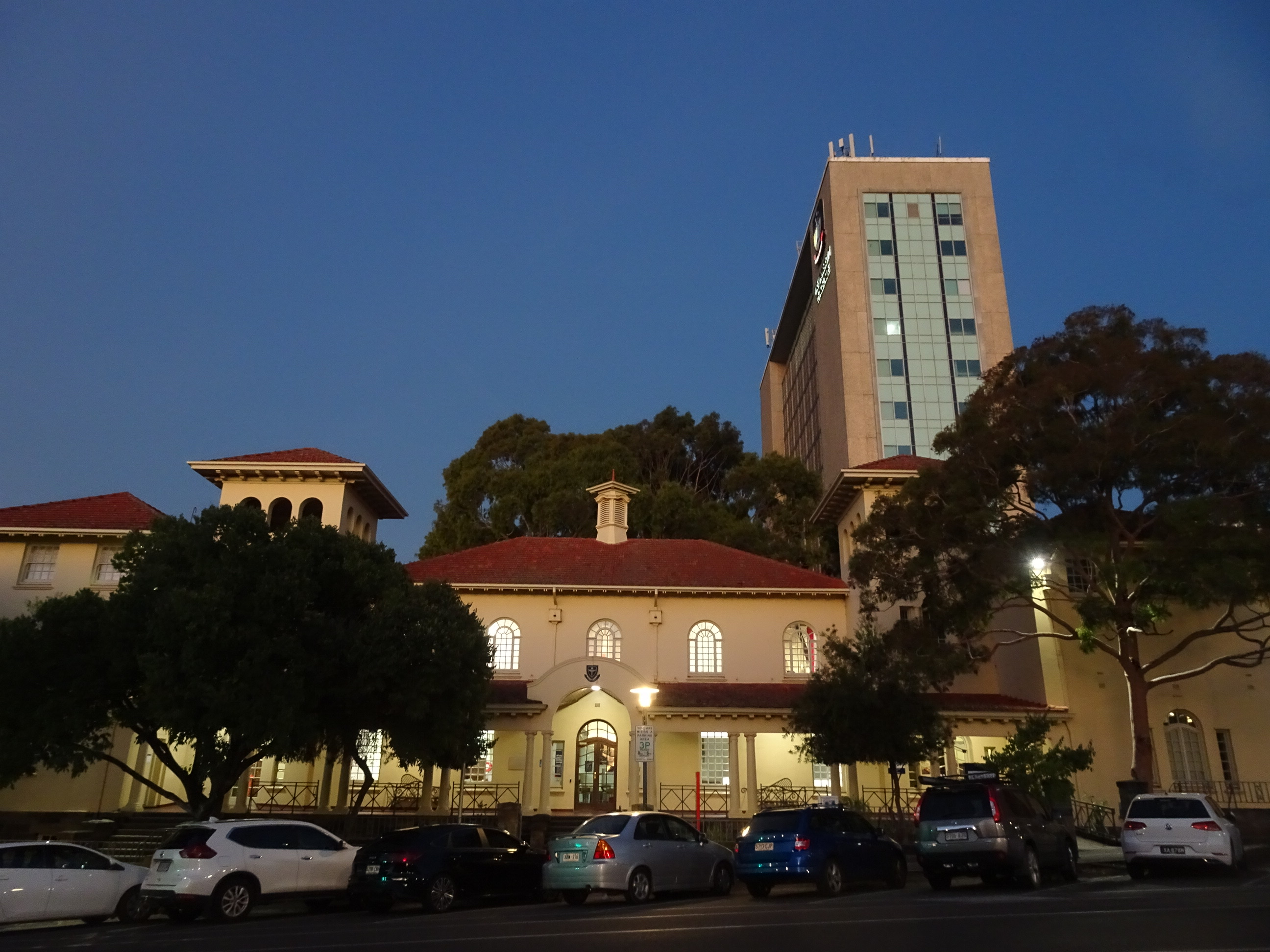
Hartley Building, Adelaide

== Recognition ==
- The former Teachers College on Kintore Avenue, Adelaide was named the Hartley Building in his honour.
- In 1896, the Hartley Scholarship was established via public subscription to the University of Adelaide.
- John Hartley School B-6, Smithfield Plains was established in 2009.
- Electoral district of Hartley in the North East of Adelaide was created in 1976.
- Hartley has a plaque in the Jubilee 150 Walkway, North Terrace, Adelaide.
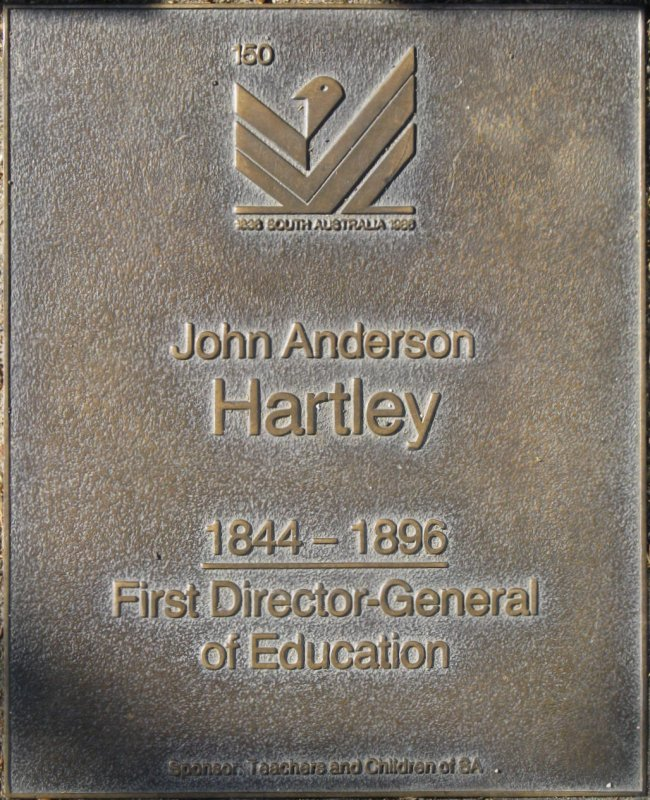
  Jubilee 150 Walkway Plaque commemorating John Hartley

== Publications ==
- 1885, founded and was editor of the Education Gazette, South Australia, a monthly journal publication
- Hartley, John A. (John Anderson), 1844-1896. 1910, Teacher's manual of elementary arithmetic / by (the late) John A. Hartley. Education Dept Adelaide
- Hartley, John A. (John Anderson), 1844-1896. 1897, Teacher's manual of elementary arithmetic. Part II, The numbers from 1 to 1000 / by John A. Hartley. Education Dept Adelaide
