= Prince Alfred College =

Private school in Adelaide, Australia

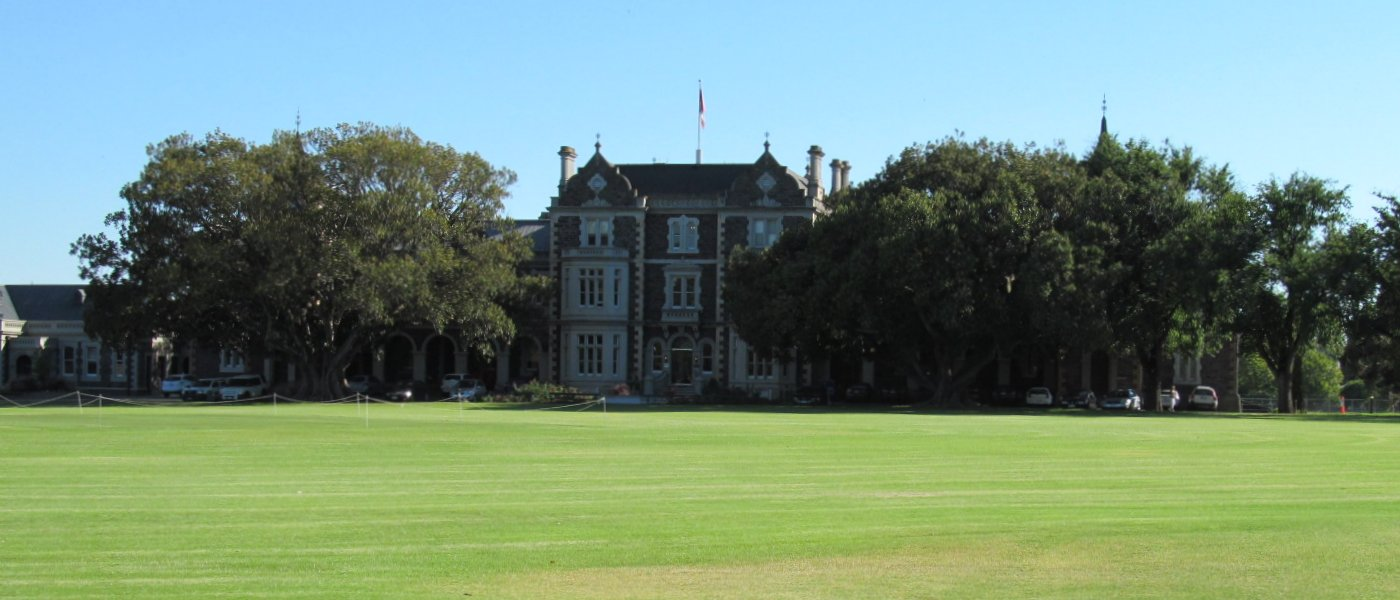
- Front oval and main building

Location
- 23 Dequetteville Terrace, Kent Town; Adelaide, South Australia, SA 5067; 34°55′21″S 138°37′9″E

Information
- Other name: PAC, Princes, the Reds
- Type: Boys; Independent/Private; Day & boarding
- Motto: Latin: Fac Fortia Et Patere (Do Brave Deeds and Endure)
- Religious affiliations: Uniting Church in Australia (1977-); Methodist Church of Australasia (1902-1977); Wesleyan Methodist Church (Great Britain) (1867-1902)
- Established: 1867; 159 years ago
- Founder: T. G. Waterhouse
- Chair of Council: Mr David Sanders
- Headmaster: Mr David Roberts
- Gender: Boys
- Age range: 5–18
- Capacity: 1,420
- Area: 24.24 acres
- Houses: 4
- Colours: Maroon & White
- Song: Prince Alfred College Song; Princes Men; The School Hymn
- Newspaper: Princes Record
- Yearbook: The Chronicle
- Affiliations: Sports Association for Adelaide Schools
- Alumni: Old boys or Old Reds
- Website: pac.edu.au

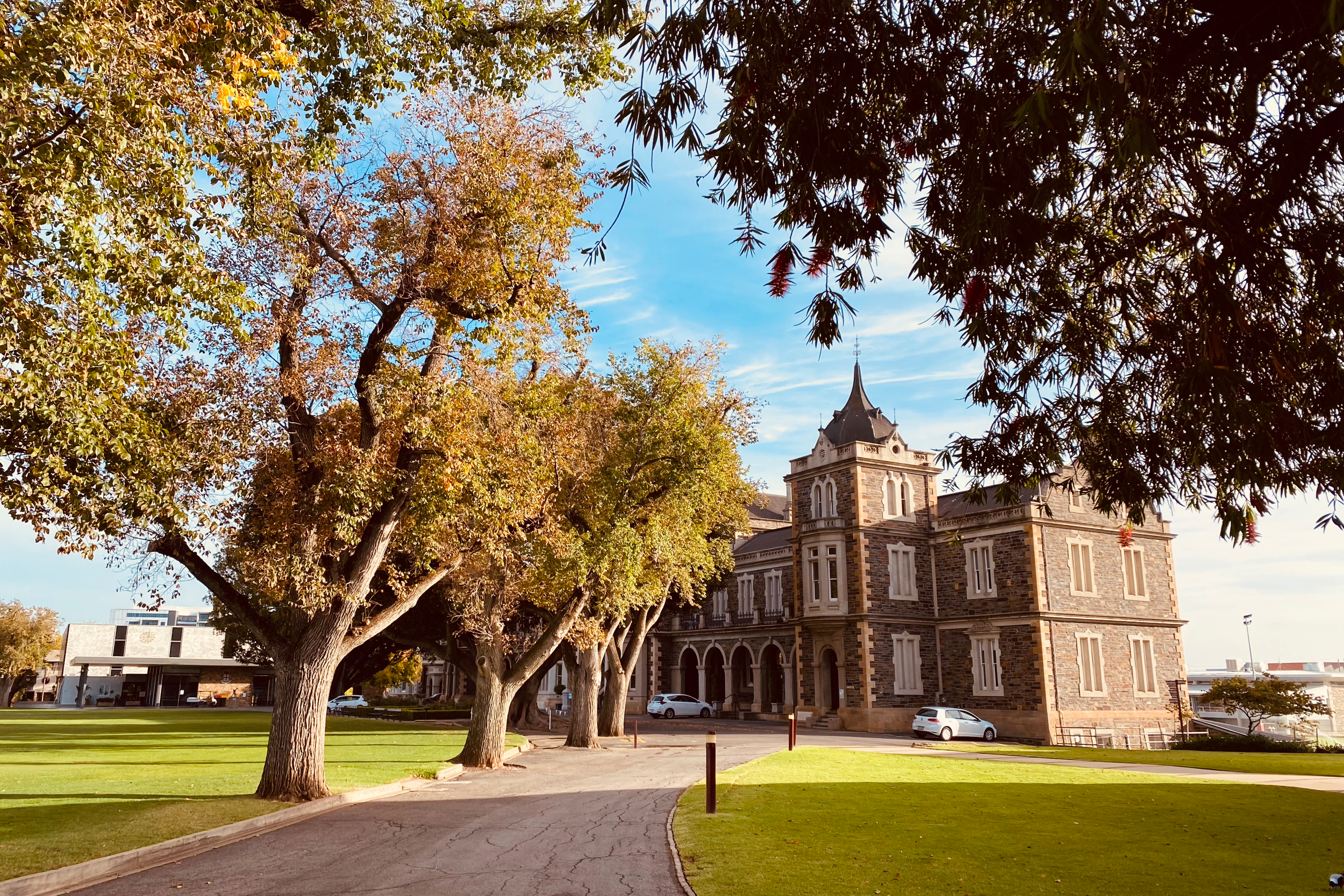
The Main Building from the preparatory school road, 2022.

Prince Alfred College is a private, independent, day and boarding school for boys, located on Dequetteville Terrace, Kent Town, near the centre of Adelaide, South Australia. The school has educated Rhodes Scholars, premiers and politicians, leaders of industry and finance, senior public servants, explorers and sportsmen. The school has maintained a worldwide alumni network, run by the Old Collegians' Association (PAOCA), since 1878. Alumni of the school are known as Old Reds.

There is presently an enrolment of some 1,420 students from Reception to Year 12 (ages 5 to 18), Prince Alfred College launched its own Early Learning Centre in 1999 with a current enrolment of 260 co-educational students.

As a school with Methodist roots, it has maintained a strong connection throughout its history to the dual ideals of "muscular Christianity and the Christian gentlemen", consciously seeking to shape the next generation of men through physical and intellectual discipline. The school has a strong sporting culture and undertakes numerous outdoor programs. There is a historic sporting rivalry between the school and nearby St Peter's College, which has religious and intra-class origins. The Intercollegiate Cricket Match, played each year between the First XI of the two schools, is considered the second oldest known ongoing cricket contest in the world, having begun in 1878.

== History ==
The school has been the subject of three histories written by, respectively, J. F. Ward (1883–1954), Ronald Malcolm Gibbs (1938-2015) and Rob Linn.

=== 1854 to 1945 ===
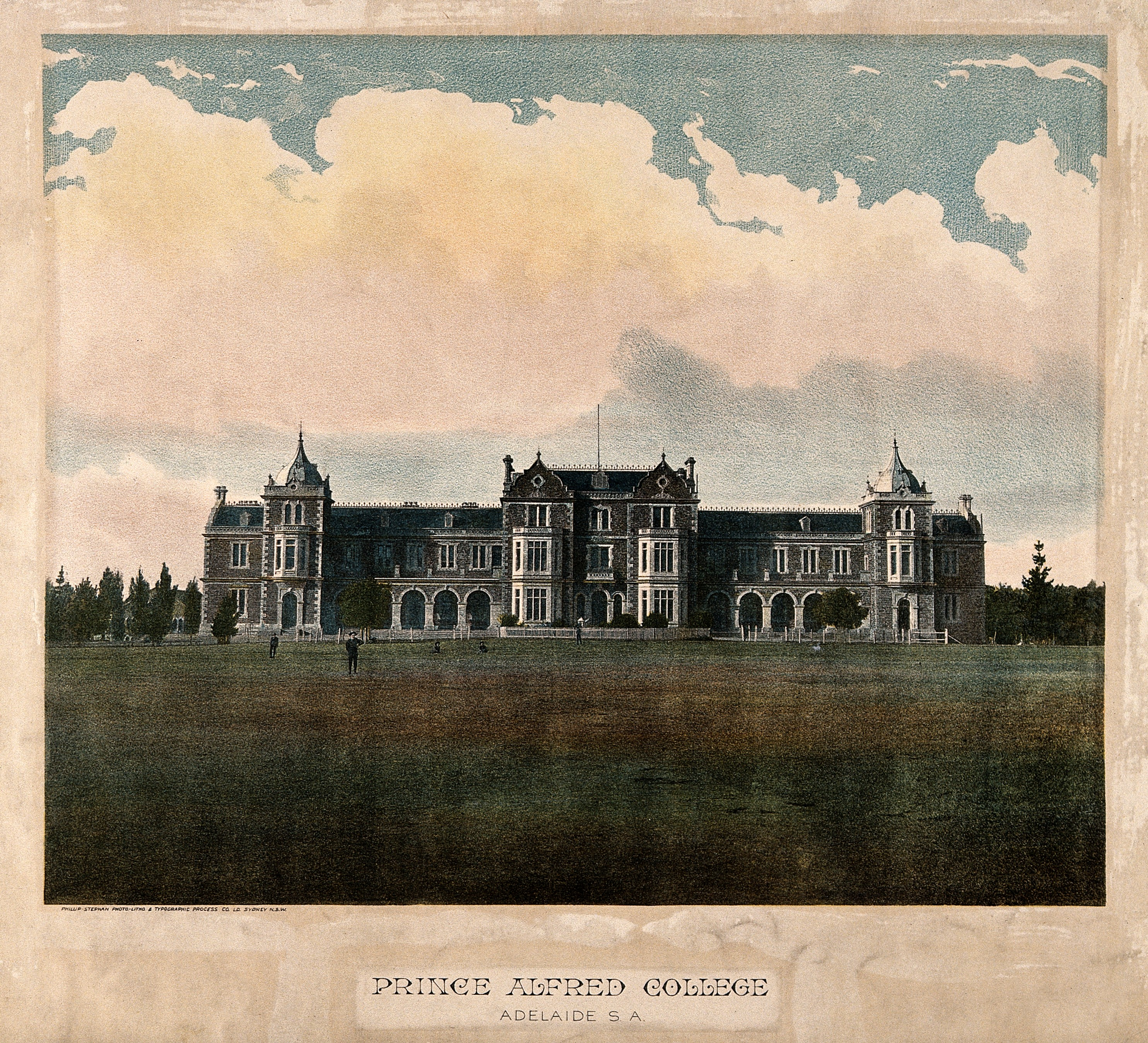
A lithograph of the completed main building with its wings.

First conceived in 1854, the Wesleyan Methodist Church (Great Britain) in South Australia voted to create a school 'for the education of our sons' in 1867, at what is now called Old Methodist Meeting Hall on Pirie Street. The land in the suburb of Kent Town had been secured earlier at the sum of £2,750 with enough capital (£6,00) to build the first part of the main building. The creation of a Methodist school followed other successful attempts in New South Wales, Victoria and Tasmania. The new school was primarily intended to educate children of wealthy businessmen and farmers with a view to create future civic leaders steeped in 'large and liberal culture'. At the time, Methodism accounted for a quarter of the colony's population, partly because of the influx of Cornish miners.

T. G. Waterhouse and the Rev. John Watsford persuaded the Governor of South Australia, Sir Dominick Daly, to ask Prince Alfred, then Duke of Edinburgh, to lay the foundation stone at the new school during his tour of the Australian colonies. In September it was announced that Alfred would lay the stone and that the new school would be the 'Alfred College'. The stone was laid on 5 November 1867 at 2pm.

The only female student to attend the school was Lilian Staple Mead, daughter of Baptist minister Silas Mead, in 1883–1884, in order to matriculate and enter University at a time when few schools were available for girls to do so.

=== 1945 to 1999 ===
The school has attracted many royal visitors since its foundation, including Queen Elizabeth II and Prince Philip in 1954. In the 1970s, the Prince Alfred College Foundation was created under the direction of businessman, W. Geoffrey Gerard. Its first project was the Scotts Creek outdoor campus located at Mannum in country South Australia, before developments at the preparatory school, gymnasium and boarding house. The Foundation quickly became the financial arm of the school responsible for many major redevelopments.

The Methodist Church of Australasia amalgamated with other Protestant churches in 1977 to form the Uniting Church in Australia, which the school is now affiliated with.

=== 2000 to present ===
In 2000 the school was mentioned in the Australian Parliament when the then Leader of the Opposition, Kim Beazley, had to deny his children attended the school. The matter arose because of a controversial letter sent to MPs by the headmaster, Stephen Codrington, regarding proposed legislative changes.

At one time, Princes was the only college in Adelaide to offer the IB Diploma at all three stages; the PYP and MYP are compulsory units of work for Preparatory and Middle school students, enabling its students to continue to complete the Diploma in year 11 and 12, or to be recognised nationally with the SACE.

On Wednesday 18 April 2018, Elizabeth II's son, Prince Edward, Earl of Wessex, visited Prince Alfred College, and participated in an unveiling a stone to commemorate the sesquicentennial of the College. In 2019, Prince Alfred College celebrated its sesquicentenary 150th Anniversary.

The second female member of the school's leadership was appointed in 2024, Deputy Headmaster/Head of Secondary School Georgina West; the first being Cynthia May (2004 – 2007).

The South Australian premier, Peter Malinauskas, officially opened a new building built by the PAOCA.

== List of headmasters ==
- 1869–1870 Samuel Fiddian
- 1871–1875 John Hartley
- 1876–1914 Frederic Chapple
- 1915–1929 W. R. Bayly
- 1930–1948 J. F. Ward
- 1949–1969 John Dunning
- 1970–1987 Geoffrey Bean
- 1988–1999 Dr. Brian Webber
- 2000–2004 Dr. Stephen Codrington
- 2004–2014 Kevin Tutt
- 2014–2022 Bradley Fenner
- 2022–current David Roberts

== Campuses ==
The original school campus is in the Adelaide suburb of Kent Town. The school also owns two other campuses, one for outdoor education in Scott's Creek, and the other in Point Turton named 'Wambana'.

=== Kent Town ===
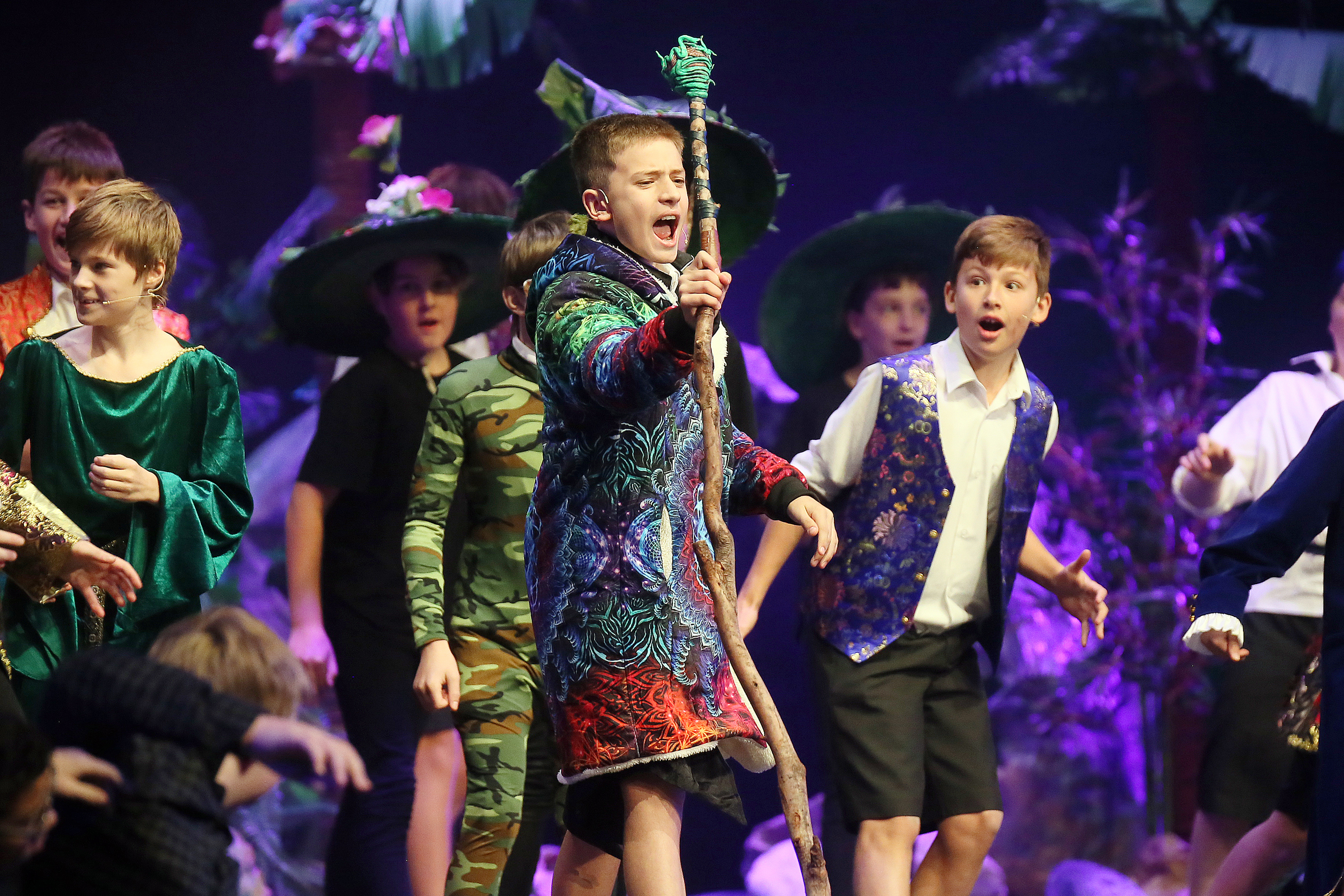
Year 6 production of William-Shakespeare's 'The-Tempest', 2022.

The original and main campus is located in Kent Town, approximately 2 km east of the Adelaide city centre. The land, originally leased by Dr Benjamin Archer Kent from 1840 to 1859, then bought by Charles Robin, was bought at auction from Charles Robin for £2750 on 18 September 1865. However, it was not until 22 June 1969 that the college celebrated its inauguration, two years after the laying of the foundation stone by H.R.H. Prince Alfred, Duke of Edinburgh.

The school campus is divided by the main building, with the preparatory school on the Flinders Street (south) side of the school, and the middle and Senior schools on the Capper Street (north) side.

=== Scotts Creek Campus ===
Scotts Creek campus is the college's Murray River retreat. The Scotts Creek Outdoor Centre is located near Morgan, approximately 165 km from Adelaide. It provides a mix of environmental education, adventure and personal development activities.

=== Wambana Campus ===
Wambana Campus is an off school ground recreational camp. The primary purpose of Wambana is to foster growth by helping adolescent boys better manage the transition to adulthood through immersion in community, academic, spiritual and outdoor adventures.

Wambana is a six-acre (approx. 2.5 hectares) property situated on the coast of southern Yorke Peninsula, bordering the township of Point Turton and rural farming land. Students and staff live in a small village in which residential accommodation and a classroom are clustered around a central meeting facility. The property consists of six accommodation buildings known as "Wardlis" (aboriginal word meaning "dwelling"). Wambana accommodates up to 32 students for five-week periods.

== Sport ==
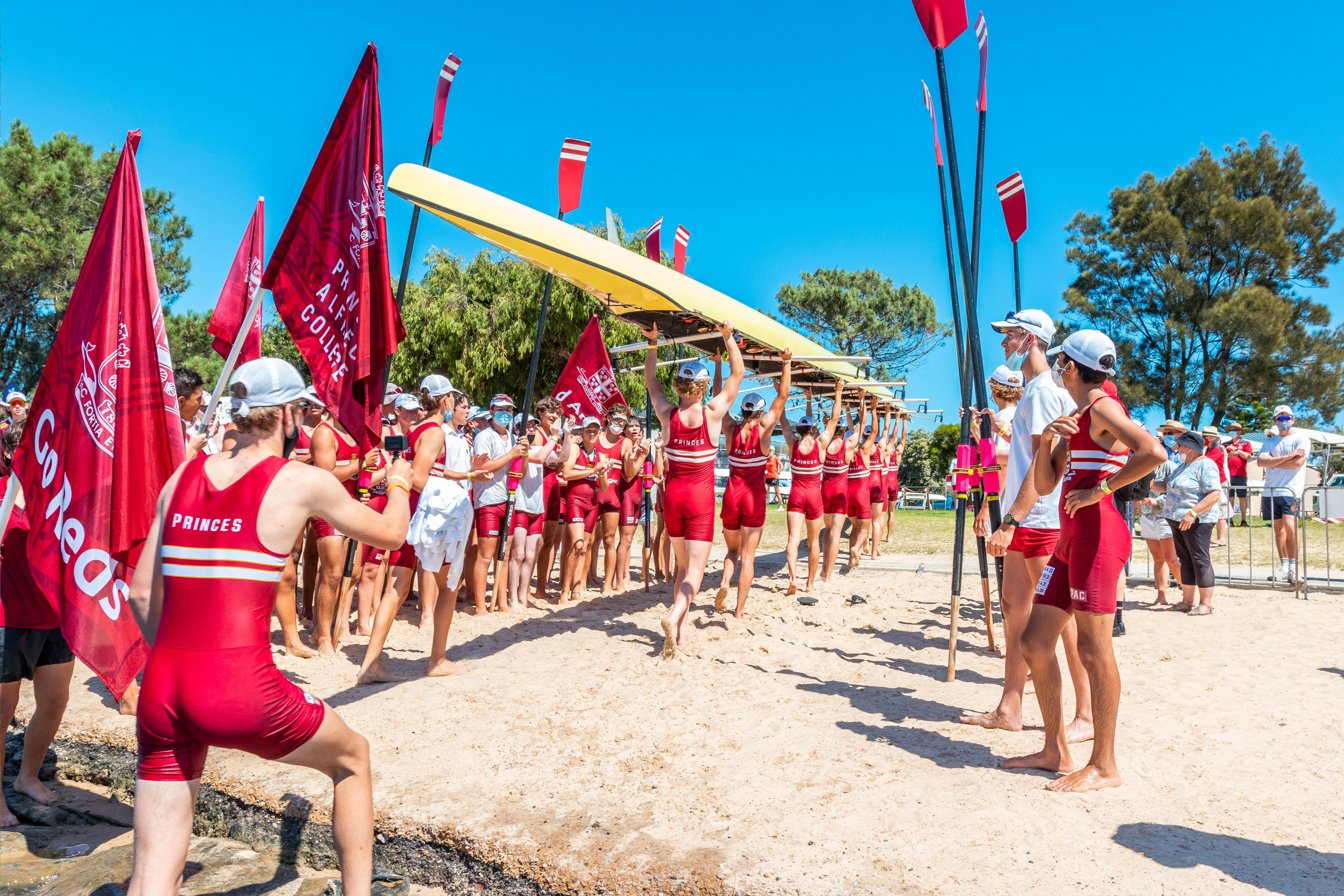
Returning to shore at Head of the River, 2022.

Prince Alfred College is a member of the Sports Association for Adelaide Schools (SAAS).

=== Intercol ===
Each sports team at Princes has an annual fixture against traditional longtime rivals Saint Peter's College, known as the "Intercol" (Inter-collegiate). These are considered by the two colleges to be the most important games of the seasons, and the fiercely fought matches of the more popular sports draw big crowds of students and old scholars from both schools. The Intercols have been played for over 100 years. At one time, the Australian rules football and the Cricket intercols were both played on Adelaide Oval. The Cricket Intercollegiate match has been competed since 1878. According to Richard Sproull this is "the oldest unbroken annual contest in the history of cricket" (Weekend Australian 5/6 December 1992).

=== Rowing ===
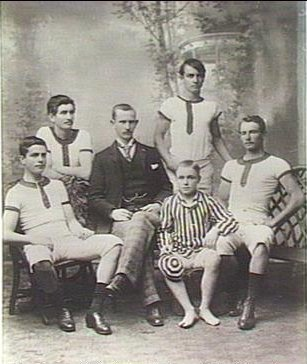
College rowing team, 1891

Rowing began at PAC in 1883 and has played an important part in the school's sporting culture since that time. The school has two boat houses, at West Lakes and by the Torrens Lake in the City of Adelaide's parklands. Although competition in local and national regattas forms an integral part of the rowing programme, the main event for each year is the Head of the River. The school won the Head of the River in 2012, 2013 and 2014. These years marked the first time the college has won three consecutive titles at the event. Notably, the school won the 2025 Head of the River, putting an end to a near ten-year St Peter's College victory record. This has been backed up by another win at the 2026 Head of the River.

== Notable alumni ==
Among the noted alumni who attended the college are Rhodes scholars, as well as people who worked in academia, business, entertainment, the judiciary, public service, politics, the sciences and sport. From the full list of Old Reds, some of the most notable include:

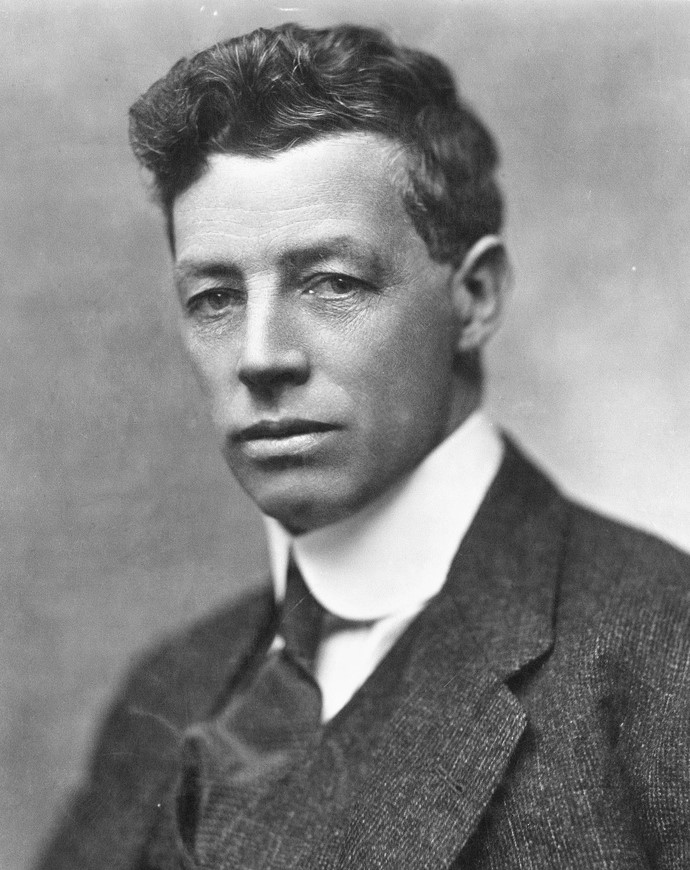
Crawford Vaughan, 27th Premier of South Australia and second Labor Premier

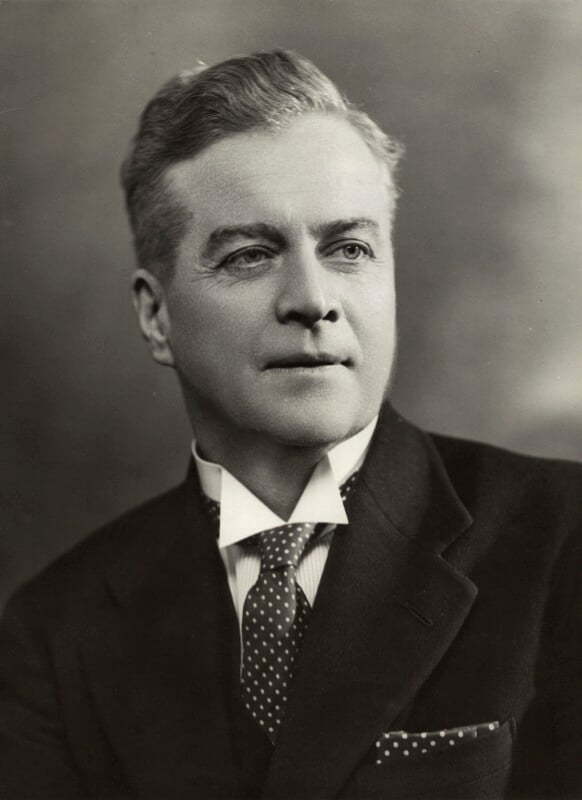
Lionel Logue, speech pathologist for King George VI, depicted in The King's Speech (2010) by Geoffrey Rush

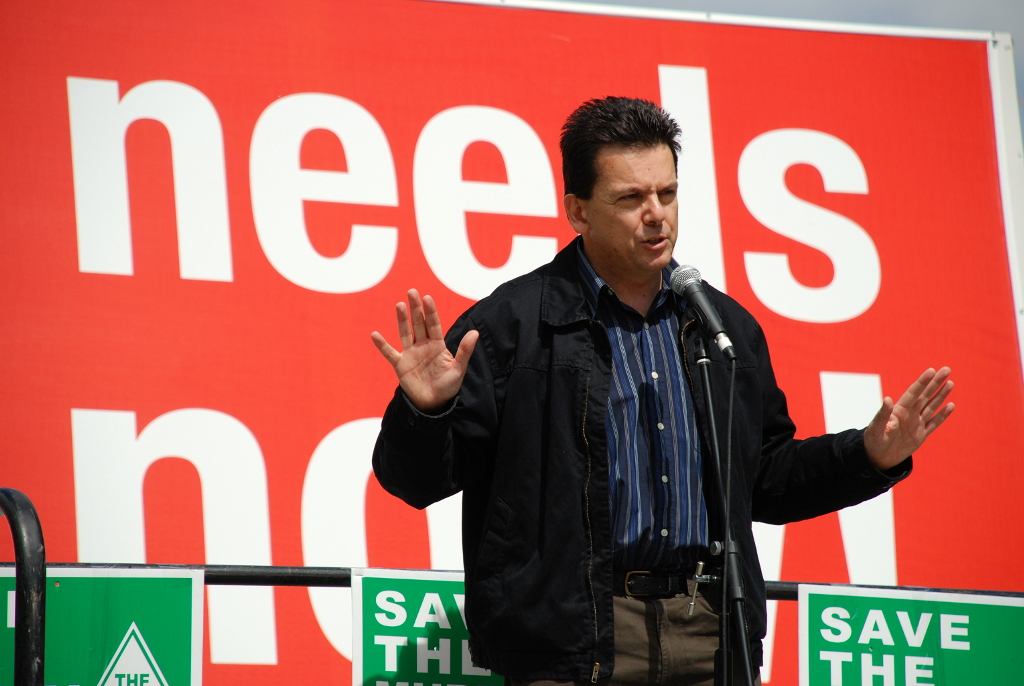
Nick Xenophon, Senator for South Australia and Member of the Legislative Council

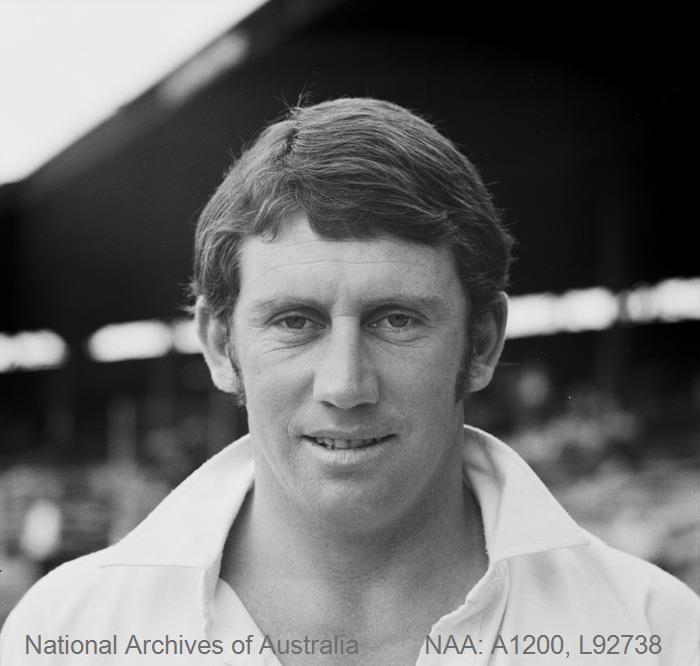
Ian Chappell, Australian cricket captain

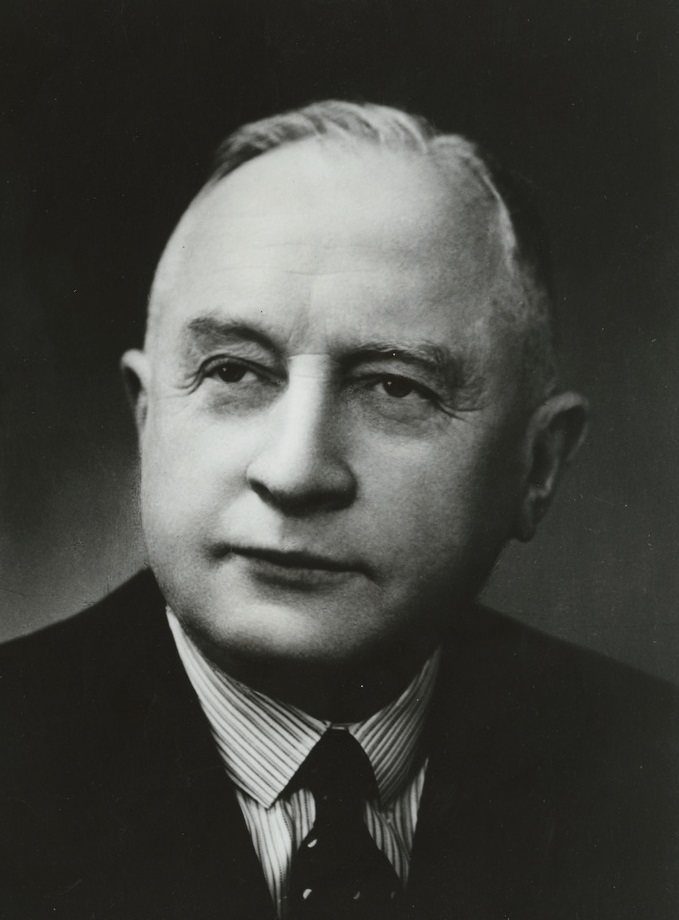
Sir Edward Holden, founder of Holden car company

== See also ==
- List of schools in South Australia
- List of boarding schools
