= Gianni De Fraja =

Italian academic (born 1960)

- Born: Gianni De Fraja; 9 April 1960 (age 66); Bologna, Italy
- Occupation: Economics professor

Academic work
- Institutions: University of Nottingham, England

Gianni De Fraja (born 9 April 1960) is an Italian academic who is professor of economics at the University of Nottingham and a Research Fellow at the Centre for Economic Policy Research (CEPR). De Fraja was born in Bologna, where he spent the first five years of his life, before moving to Bassano del Grappa and then on to Mestre, near Venice, where he lived until he was eighteen. He attended SSSUP college in Pisa from which he graduated in 1982. He then moved to a house near the Chianti Hills, near Vagliagli, where he took his doctorate at Siena with a thesis on game theory. After a year in Siena, he was encouraged by his teachers to go abroad and so went to England in Linacre College, Oxford. After two years in Oxford, he returned to Italy for military service in the Italian Army. After a year, he returned to complete his thesis on oligopolistic competition.

Since finishing his studies in Oxford, De Frajahas taken up academic positions in the universities of Leicester, Bristol, and York. He has also been on academic trips to Tokyo, Bonn, and Barcelona. After thirteen years in York, he is now settled in Leicester, with two daughters and a son. Between 1999 and 2005, he was Managing Editor of the Bulletin of Economic Research. His research interests are in the areas of public economics, economics of education, regulation, and game theory. He has published papers in, among others, Journal of Public Economics, International Economic Review, Review of Economic Studies, Economic Journal, Journal of Political Economy, and Oxford Economic Papers. De Fraja considers himself a bright. He was elected head of the Department of Economics at the University of Leicester and began his mandate in September 2008. In 2011, he was replaced as head of department by Stephen Hall.
