= Ren Naying =

Chinese activist

- Education: Tsinghua University; Linacre College, Oxford
- Occupations: Student and LGBT activist
- Awards: Rhodes Scholarship

Ren Naying is a Chinese student and LGBT activist. She attended Tsinghua University and was one of China's first Rhodes Scholars, attending Linacre College, Oxford for MPhil. in Social Anthropology. She co-founded the China LGBT+ Youth Network, an NGO which seeks to promote "LGBT+ rights with a focus on university community building."

== Biography ==
Ren majored in English Language and Literature at Tsinghua University. While completing her undergraduate degree, she developed an interest in gender and queer theory, which led her to volunteer with NGOs such as the Beijing LGBT Center. She applied for the Rhodes Scholarship while researching graduate programs.

She currently resides in Beijing.
