= Paul Slack =

British historian (b.1943)

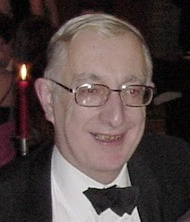
Paul Slack at Linacre College

Paul Alexander Slack FBA FRHistS (born 23 January 1943) is a British historian. He is a former principal of Linacre College, Oxford, pro-vice-chancellor of the University of Oxford, and professor of early modern social history in the University of Oxford.

== Life ==
Slack was educated at Bradford Grammar School, the University of Oxford (BA, DPhil). He was a fellow of Exeter College, Oxford, from 1973 until 1996. He served as junior proctor during the academic year 1986–87 and chairman of the General Board 1995–96.

On 1 October 1996, he took office as principal of Linacre College. He retired in September 2010. He was appointed pro-vice-chancellor in 1997, becoming in 2000 pro-vice-chancellor (academic services and university collections).

In 1999 he was appointed professor of early modern social history. He is also a member of the Environmental Change Institute advisory board and a former chairman of the curators of the University Libraries.

Slack was elected a Fellow of the British Academy in 1990.

== Publications ==
Author

- Paul Slack, Plague: A Very Short Introduction (Oxford University Press, Second Edition, 2021; ISBN 978-019887111-8)
- Paul Slack, The English Poor Law, 1531-1782 (Basingstoke: Macmillan Education, 1990; Cambridge: Cambridge University Press, 1995)
- Paul Slack, From Reformation to improvement: public welfare in early modern England (Oxford: Clarendon Press, 1998; 1999)
- Paul Slack, The impact of plague in Tudor and Stuart England (London; Boston: Routledge & Kegan Paul, 1985; reprinted with corrections, Oxford: Clarendon Press, 1985)
- Paul Slack, Poverty and policy in Tudor and Stuart England (London: Longman, 1988)
- Paul Slack, "Poverty and politics in Salisbury 1597-1666", in Peter Clark and Paul Slack, eds, Crisis and order in English towns, 1500-1700: essays in urban history (London: Routledge & Kegan Paul; Toronto: University of Toronto Press, 1972), pp. 164–203
- Paul Slack: "Social Policy and the Constraints of Government, 1547–58", in Jennifer Loach and Robert Tittler, eds, The Mid-Tudor Polity c. 1540–1560 (London: Macmillan), pp. 94–115
- Paul Slack, The Traditional community under stress (Milton Keynes: Open University Press, 1977)

Editor

- Paul Slack, ed., Environments and historical change (Oxford: Oxford University Press, 1999)
- Paul Slack, ed., Poverty in early-Stuart Salisbury (Devizes: Wiltshire Record Society, 1975)
- Paul Slack, ed., Rebellion, popular protest, and the social order in early modern England (Cambridge: Cambridge University Press, 1984)

Co-editor

- Peter Burke, Brian Harrison, and Paul Slack, eds, Civil histories: essays presented to Sir Keith Thomas (Oxford: Oxford University Press, 2000)
- Peter Clark and Paul Slack, eds, Crisis and order in English towns, 1500-1700: essays in urban history (London: Routledge & Kegan Paul; Toronto: University of Toronto Press, 1972)
- Peter Clark and Paul Slack, English towns in transition 1500-1700 (London: Oxford University Press, 1976)
- Terence Ranger and Paul Slack, eds, Epidemics and ideas: essays on the historical perception of pestilence (Cambridge: Cambridge University Press, 1992)
- Julie Trottier and Paul Slack, eds, Managing water resources past and present (Oxford: Oxford University Press, 2004)
- Paul Slack and Ryk Ward, eds, The peopling of Britain: the shaping of a human landscape (Oxford: Oxford University Press, 2002)
- John Morrill, Paul Slack, and Daniel Woolf, eds, Public duty and private conscience in seventeenth-century England: essays presented to G.E. Aylmer (Oxford: Clarendon Press, 1993)

Academic offices
Preceded by Sir Bryan Cartledge	Principal of Linacre College, Oxford; 1996-2010	Succeeded by Nick Brown
