= Bryan Cartledge =

British diplomat and academic

Sir Bryan Cartledge KCMG

British Ambassador to the USSR
- In office 1985–1988
- Prime Minister: Margaret Thatcher
- Preceded by: Iain Sutherland
- Succeeded by: Rodric Braithwaite

British Ambassador to Hungary
- In office 1980–1983
- Prime Minister: Margaret Thatcher
- Preceded by: Sir Richard Parsons
- Succeeded by: Peter Unwin

Personal details
- Born: 10 June 1931 (age 95)

Sir Bryan Cartledge KCMG (born 10 June 1931), is a former British diplomat and academic.

After studying at Hurstpierpoint College and St John's College, Cambridge, he took research posts at St Antony's College, Oxford and the Hoover Institute at Stanford University. He was inspired to become a diplomat after being invited to assist the former British prime minister and foreign secretary Sir Anthony Eden with his memoirs.

In the British Diplomatic Service, Cartledge served in Sweden, the Soviet Union and Iran before being appointed, in 1977, to be Private Secretary (Overseas Affairs) to the British prime minister; he served both James Callaghan and Margaret Thatcher in that capacity before taking up his first ambassadorial appointment as British ambassador to Hungary in 1980. He then headed the Defence and Overseas Secretariat of the Cabinet Office, as deputy secretary of the British Cabinet, before returning to Moscow as ambassador, where he had regular dealings with Mikhail Gorbachev and Eduard Shevardnadze.

Cartledge left the Diplomatic Service in 1988 on his election to be Principal of Linacre College, Oxford. In Oxford, he has edited six books on environmental issues. He holds diplomas in the Hungarian language from the University of Westminster (UK) and University of Debrecen (Hungary). His history of Hungary, The Will to Survive, fulfills an aspiration which grew out of his deep interest in the country where he served three years as ambassador. He subsequently wrote Károlyi & Bethlen: Hungary - The Peace Conferences of 1919–23 and their Aftermath for the "Makers of the Modern World" series by Haus Publishing.

Academic offices
Preceded by John Bamborough	Principal of Linacre College, Oxford; 1988–1996	Succeeded by Paul Slack
