= Michael Stumpf =

Michael Stumpf (born 1970) is a scholar in the field of systems biology, in particular the inference of mathematical models using statistical inference and machine learning approaches. He has made ample contributions to network science, cell fate decision making processes and population genetics.

== Life ==
Stumpf was born in Regensburg, Germany, and grew up in Straubing and Rothenburg ob der Tauber. He studied physics at the Universities of Tübingen, Sussex and Göttingen. Upon graduating with his diploma in physics, he went on to study as a graduate student at the University of Oxford, where he received his DPhil. in statistical physics in 1999. Whilst a graduate student he was a member of Balliol College. In 1999 Stumpf moved into biology and worked for three years at the Department of Zoology of the University of Oxford with Professor Robert May, Baron May of Oxford. During this time Stumpf held a fellowship at Linacre College. Since 2003 Stumpf has worked at the Centre for Bioinformatics at Imperial College, London. In 2004 he was awarded an EMBO Young Investigator Award, and in 2007 Stumpf was appointed to the Chair of Theoretical Systems Biology at Imperial College, London. He has held a Royal Society Wolfson Research Merit Award, and in 2011 he was awarded the Rector's Medal for Excellence in Research Supervision, and a Miegunyah Distinguished Fellowship in 2013.

Stumpf is married with two children and lives in West London.

In January 2018, he moved his research group to the University of Melbourne. He was elected a Fellow of the Australian Academy of Science in May 2025.

== Work ==
Stumpf's research covers a variety of fields, including

- development of statistical approaches and methodologies for the integrative analysis of systems biology data.
- statistical and mathematical analysis of complex dynamical systems.
- the analysis of complex biological networks, including protein interaction and gene regulation networks.
- mathematical modelling of molecular, cellular and developmental systems and processes in biology.
