= Nick Brown (academic) =

British botanist and academic (born 1962)

Nick Leimu-Brown
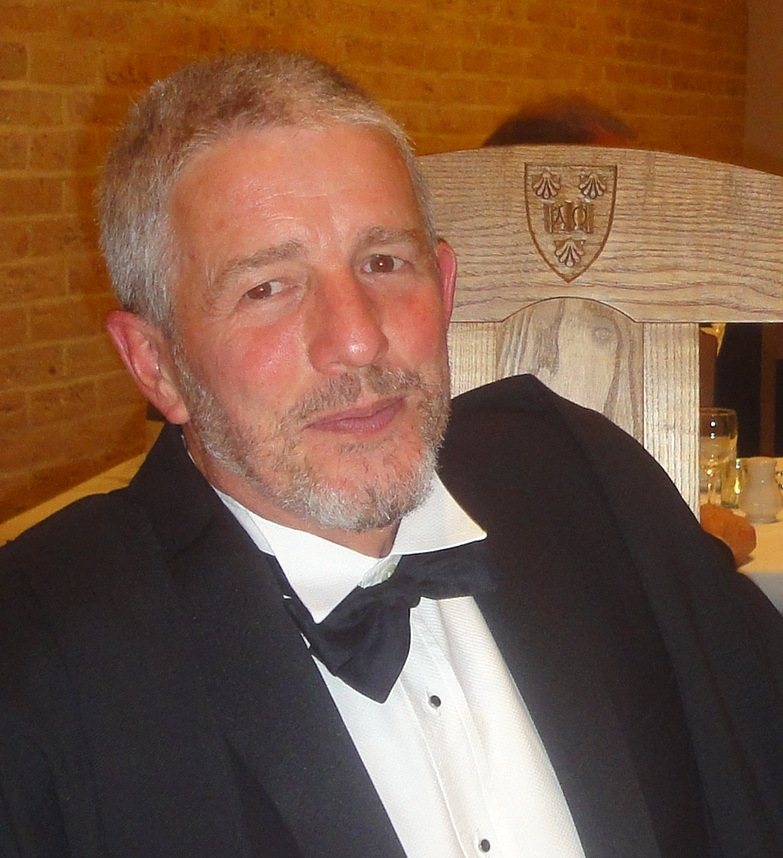
- Leimu-Brown in 2021
- Born: Nicholas David Brown; 4 December 1962 (age 63); Brockworth, Gloucestershire, England
- Education: Churchill College, Cambridge; University of Aberdeen; Linacre College, Oxford
- Scientific career
- Fields: Ecology; plant biology; forestry; ecological restoration
- Workplaces: University of Manchester; University of Oxford
- Thesis: Dipterocarp regeneration in tropical rain forest gaps of different sizes
- Doctoral advisor: Timothy Charles Whitmore

Nicholas David Leimu-Brown (born 4 December 1962) is a British botanist and academic. Since 2010, he has been Principal of Linacre College, Oxford. He is also a Commonwealth Scholarship Commissioner.

== Early life and education ==
Leimu-Brown was born on 4 December 1962 in Brockworth, Gloucestershire, England. He completed the International Baccalaureate at UWC Atlantic College in Wales from 1979 to 1981. He then studied geography at the University of Cambridge (Churchill College) between 1982 and 1985 and then for an MSc degree in ecology at the University of Aberdeen. From 1986 to 1990, he studied for a DPhil degree in Forest Ecology under the supervision of Timothy Charles Whitmore at the University of Oxford (Linacre College). His thesis was titled "Dipterocarp regeneration in tropical rain forest gaps of different sizes". He has also completed a diploma in Learning and Teaching in Higher Education.

== Career and research ==
Leimu-Brown was a lecturer at Manchester University from 1989, and then from 1992 to 2010 he was a lecturer in forestry at the University of Oxford.

In 2010, he took office as the fourth and current Principal of Linacre College, Oxford. During his tenure, he has championed investment in scholarships and has worked to improve access to graduate degrees, with more than 50 scholarships now offered at Linacre in an average year.

Since 2014, he has been a Commonwealth Scholarship Commissioner, acting as chair of the awards policy committee.

Since 2015, he has been the chair of the University of Oxford buildings and estates sub-committee, and serves on the planning and resource allocation committee of council. He also chairs the Radcliffe Observatory Quarter and the Science Area Advisory Boards.

== Personal life ==
Leimu-Brown has four children: three daughters and one son. He has been married to Dr Roosa Leimu-Brown since 2013. She is a yoga therapist, movement educator and dance artist with a PhD degree in biology, affiliated with the Department of Plant Sciences, University of Oxford. Nick Leimu-Brown's hobbies include sailing.

Academic offices
Preceded by Paul Slack	Principal of Linacre College, Oxford; 2010–present	Incumbent
