= John Bamborough =

British scholar of English literature

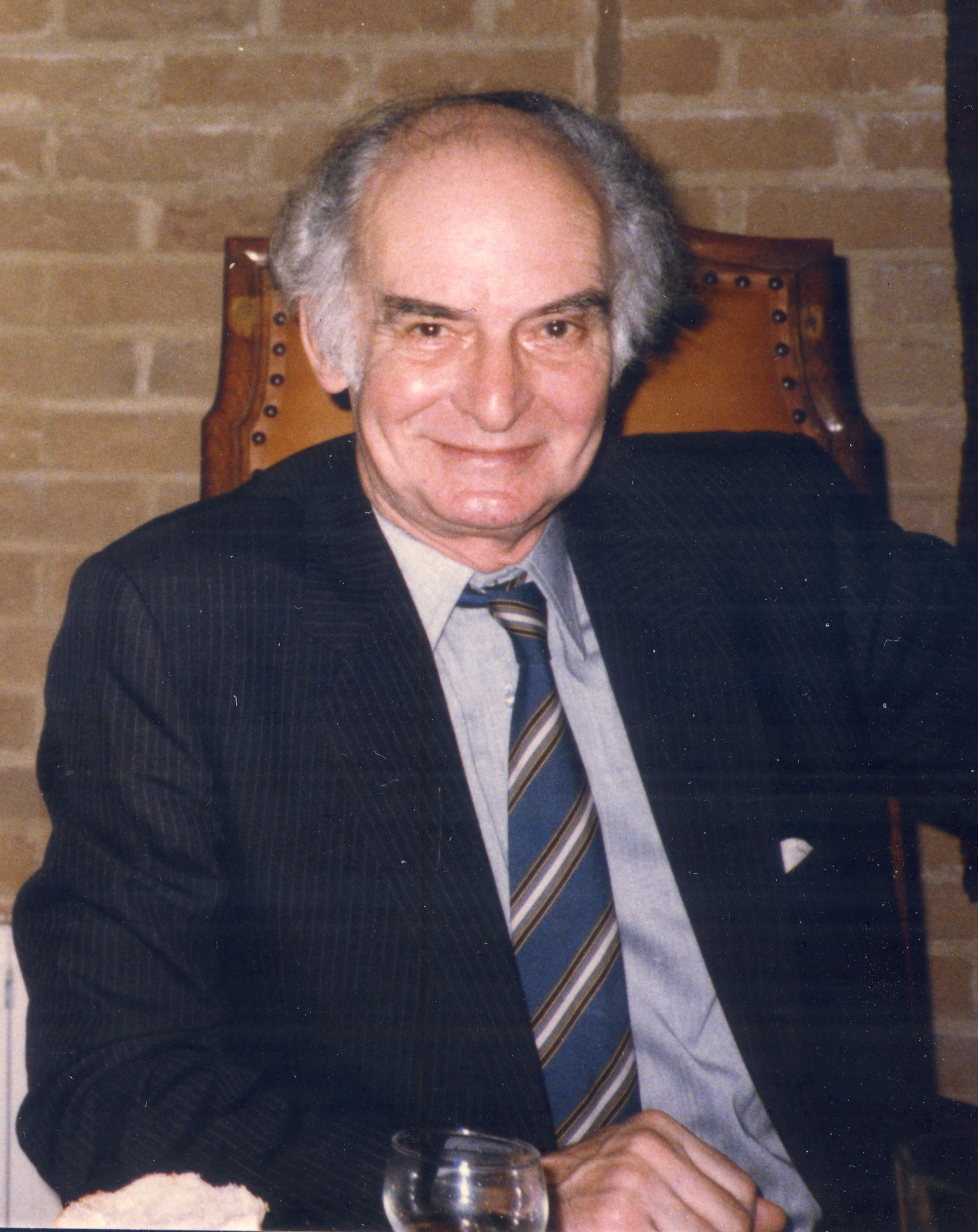
- John Bamborough, first Principal of Linacre College, Oxford
- Born: John Bernard Bamborough; 3 January 1921; London, England
- Died: 13 February 2009 (aged 88); Oxford, England
- Education: New College, Oxford
- Occupation: English scholar
- Spouse: Anne Indrehus
- Writing career
- Language: English

John Bernard Bamborough (3 January 1921 – 13 February 2009) was a British scholar of English literature and founding Principal of Linacre College, Oxford.

Bamborough was educated at The Haberdashers' Aske's Boys' School in Elstree, Hertfordshire and at New College, Oxford. After serving five years in the Royal Navy during World War II he returned to Oxford as a Fellow of first New College and then Wadham College, where between 1947 and 1961 he was in succession Dean, Domestic Bursar and Senior Tutor.

Bamborough left Wadham to embark on an ambitious project that was to change the shape of the University. As recounted by a former student:

In the early 1960s, the University of Oxford was struggling to come to terms with the advent of a growing and strange new group of 'students'—graduate students, neither the undergraduates nor the dons with which it was familiar—who were often foreign to both the country and its traditions. A 'graduate' college was mooted and found a building. It needed an inspired touch: a young head, a scholar ... someone acquainted with university administration—and preferably possessing real personality. John Bamborough—always known to all and sundry as 'Bam' for as long as I've known—was clearly the man.

The Bamborough Building, Linacre College, Oxford. (Opened in 1985 and named in 1986.)

The outcome was Linacre College (initially Linacre House), the first Oxford University college to accept only graduate students and the first to admit men and women on an equal basis. Bamborough had the central role in establishing and nurturing the new institution and he remained its Principal until 1988, also serving within the university administration as a member of the Hebdomadal Council from 1961 to 1979 and as Chairman of the General Board of the Faculties from 1964 to 1967. He is fondly remembered by many students and staff, one of whom wrote in a book dedicated to the Principal,

He was intelligent, scholarly and articulate—we expect that of all Oxford dons—but above that, he was gracious, witty, fair, farsighted, optimistic and compassionate.

After retiring as Principal, Bamborough focused on scholarship. Since 1979 he had been working on the world's first full commentary on Robert Burton's The Anatomy of Melancholy, an enormous 17th Century book with hundreds of obscure sources. The final volume of Bamborough's work was published in 2000, nine years before his death. An accommodation building on the main Linacre College site is named in his honour.

== Publications ==
Books

- The Little World of Man (London: Longmans 1952)
- Ben Jonson (London: Longmans 1959)
- Robert Burton: The Anatomy of Melancholy (Oxford: Clarendon Press, six volumes 1989-2000)

Academic offices
Preceded by none	Principal of Linacre College, Oxford; 1962–1988	Succeeded by Sir Bryan Cartledge
