= Bulletin of Economic Research =

- Discipline: Economics
- Language: English
- Edited by: Sarah Brown, Andrew Pickering, Francis Breedon, Francesco Giovannoni, Saqib Jafarey and Yuan Ju

Publication details
- History: 1948-present
- Publisher: John Wiley & Sons
- Frequency: Quarterly
- Impact factor: 0.619 (2020)

Standard abbreviations
- ISO 4: Bull. Econ. Res.

Indexing
- ISSN: 0307-3378 (print); 1467-8586 (web)
- LCCN: 70618386
- OCLC no.: 39068313

Links
- Journal homepage; Online access; Online archive

The Bulletin of Economic Research is a quarterly peer-reviewed academic journal covering the fields of economics, econometrics, and economic history that is published by John Wiley & Sons. It was established in 1948 and publishes full-length articles alongside shorter referenced articles, notes and comments, and survey articles.

According to the Journal Citation Reports, the journal has a 2020 impact factor of 0.619, ranking it 334/353 of journals in the category "Economics".
