= Roger James Rossiter =

Australian physician and biochemist (1913–1976)

Roger James Rossiter (24 July 1913 – 21 February 1976) was an Australian-born physician and biochemist. He worked on neurochemistry, lipids in the brain and nerves, and changes in myelin with aging. He made use of radioactive phosphorus isotopes to study the biochemistry of glycerophosphatides and phosphoinositides.

Rossiter was born in Glenelg, Australia, where his father James Leonard Rossiter was a well-known educationist. Educated a private schools he went to the University of Western Australia with a Rhodes Scholarship and graduated in chemistry and mathematics in 1934. He then joined Merton College, Oxford and studied biochemistry and physiology with a view to pursuing medical research. He received a D.Phil. (1940), M.A. (1942) and a bachelor's degree in medicine and surgery (1941). He then joined the Medical Research Council Burns Unit at Oxford during the war. He then joined the Royal Army Medical Corps and his wife also joined army service as an anaesthetist. He worked first with malaria research in England, then with a trauma shock research unit in Italy and on marasmus research in India. After the war he returned to Oxford to continue studies on neurobiochemistry and received a D.M. (1946) and received a Radcliffe Prize in 1947. He was invited to join the University of Western Ontario where he conducted much of his research in neurochemistry. He set up an isotope lab in 1950 to use labelled phosphorus to study the movement and synthesis of brain lipids.

Rossiter married anaesthetist Helen M. Randell in 1940. They had three sons and a daughter. He died from heart failure while on research in Helsinki, Finland.
