= Maria Repnikova =

American political scientist

- Citizenship: American
- Education: Georgetown University (BS), University of Oxford (M.Phil, D.Phil)
- Occupation: Political scientist
- Employer: Georgia State University
- Website: https://www.mariarepnikova.com

Maria Repnikova is an American political scientist. She is currently associate professor in global communication at Georgia State University.

== Education ==
Repnikova holds a B.S. in foreign service from Georgetown University and an MPhil and D.Phil. in politics from the University of Oxford, where she studied as a Rhodes Scholar.

== Publications ==
=== Books ===
- Media Politics in China: Improvising Power under Authoritarianism, Cambridge University Press, 2017

=== Articles ===
- The Balance of Soft Power, Foreign Affairs, June 21, 2022
- Does China's Propaganda Work? New York Times, April 16, 2020
