= Lot Fourteen =

Business and technology precinct in Adelaide, South Australia

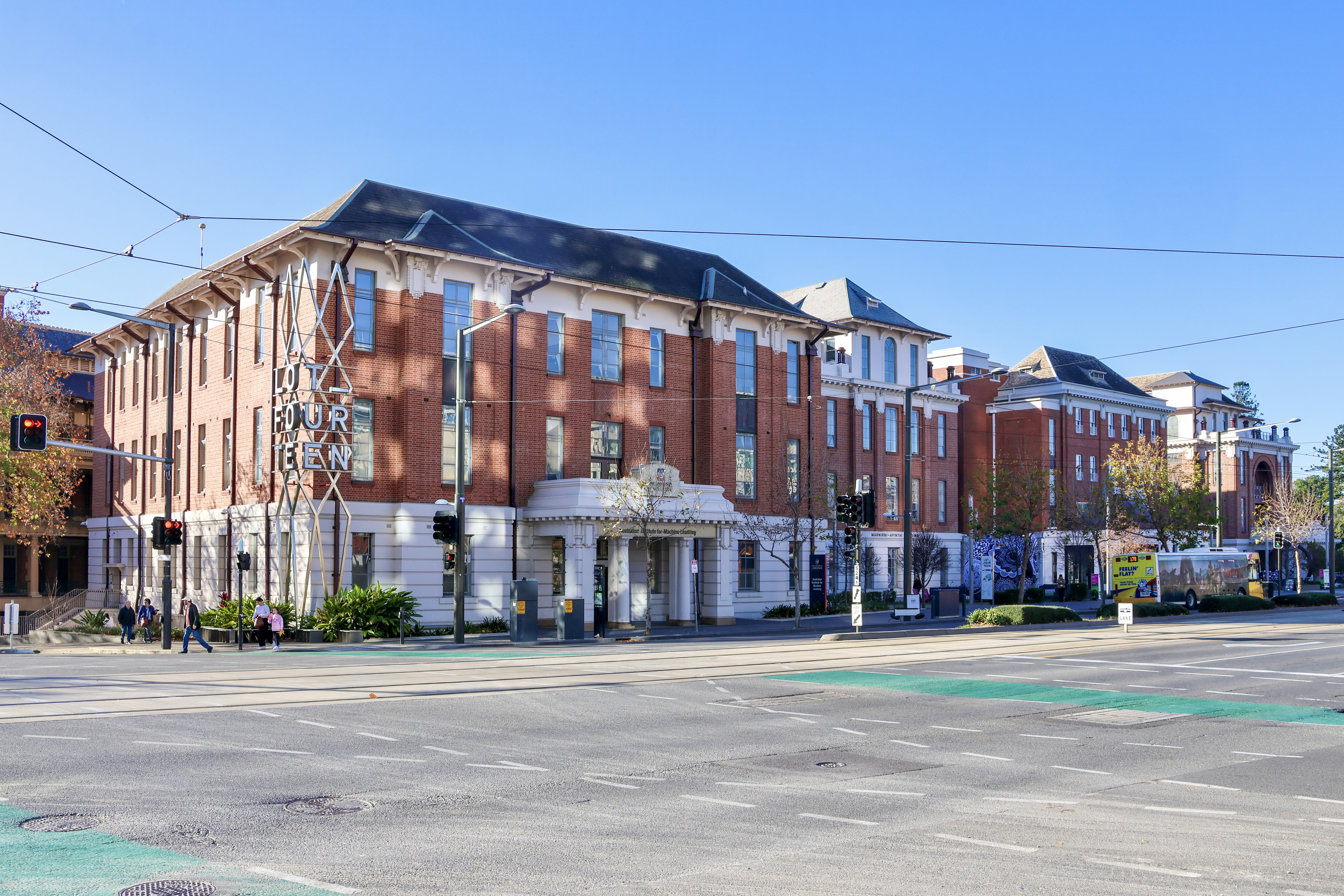
- Lot Fourteen viewed from the corner of Frome Road and North Terrace in 2026

General information
- Type: Business and technology precinct
- Location: Corner of North Terrace and Frome Road, Adelaide, South Australia, Australia
- Coordinates: 34°55′13″S 138°36′31″E
- Current tenants: Australian Space Agency; Australian Institute for Machine Learning; Australian Cyber Collaboration Centre

Technical details
- Grounds: 7 ha (17 acres)

Design and construction
- Developer: Renewal SA

Website
- lotfourteen.com.au

Lot Fourteen is an innovation district at the eastern end of North Terrace in Adelaide city centre, South Australia. The 7 ha (17-acre) site formerly accommodated the old Royal Adelaide Hospital, which was moved to a new building at the western end of North Terrace in 2017. Its name was derived from the original 1837 plan for Adelaide by surveyor-general Colonel William Light. By 2020, refurbished hospital buildings were home to a large number of tenants, and further new buildings and public spaces are planned, scheduled for completion around 2025. The redevelopment of the site has been led by the Government of South Australia.

The innovation district is home to 190+ organisations across defence, space, cyber and critical technologies, including Amazon Web Services, Salesforce, the Australian Space Agency, the Australian Institute for Machine Learning and Stone and Chalk.

First new build onsite, Defence HQ, will be an 11-storey building and a focal point for defence, space and critical technologies. Starting construction in July 2026 it is expected to be completed by the end of 2028. Confirmed tenants include BAE Systems Australia, Australian Defence Technologies Academy, Innovation Hub and SpaceBase.

There are a number of technology-focused enterprises at Lot Fourteen. The headquarters of the Australian Space Agency, a Commonwealth government department and other space-related companies including Inovor Technologies, Myriota and the Australasian Space Innovation Institute. The Australian Cyber Collaboration Centre (A3C) is housed in the Eleanor Harrald Building (former nurses' quarters), now named TechCentral. The Australian Institute for Machine Learning, an artificial intelligence research institute created collaboratively by the state government and the University of Adelaide, is located in the south-western corner of the precinct. The Stone & Chalk start-up hub, in the old Allied Health Building, (now Marnirni-apinthi building) house over 90 tech startups.

== Background ==
The old Royal Adelaide Hospital, situated at the eastern end of North Terrace, with some of its buildings dating back to the 19th century, was moved into a new complex at the western end of North Terrace in September 2017. Plans for the redevelopment of the 7 ha (17-acre) site commenced well before the move. The 7 ha (17-acre) site is in within the cultural precinct of the city, next to the Adelaide Botanic Garden and with the University of Adelaide, University of South Australia, Adelaide Botanic High School and the Art Gallery of South Australia as close neighbours. A mixed development, incorporating cultural institutions as well as residential, hotel and office uses is planned for the site. Federal funds have been injected into the project, under an agreement known as the "Adelaide City Deal".

The name "Lot Fourteen" is derived from the original 1837 plan for Adelaide by surveyor-general Colonel William Light.

Responsibility for the redevelopment was led by the Department of the Premier and Cabinet, working in collaboration with the Department for Innovation and Skills, Defence SA, Department for Trade and Investment, Department of Treasury and Finance, the urban renewal arm of the South Australian Government, Renewal SA and the Chief Entrepreneur.

History tours were available to appreciate the heritage value of the site.

== Timeline ==
=== 2017 ===
Before the new RAH building was complete, various ideas were mooted about uses for the site of the old buildings. In January 2017, the then South Australian Government had plans to redevelop the site which included more than 1,000 apartments and a five-star hotel. It was decided that five heritage buildings would be retained, and about a third of the site would become part of the adjoining Adelaide Botanic Garden. There were also plans to turn the helipad into a "roof-top hotel".

=== 2018 ===
In March 2018, there was a change of government, with Steven Marshall's Liberal Party voted into office. With the focus on its development as an "innovation hub", the state budget in September allocated A$476 million over five years to government authority Renewal SA to help lure startups and industries associated with the Australian Space Agency, which would be located on the site. Industry and Skills minister David Pisoni said the site would host up to 650 workspaces, conference and collaboration facilities. Several of the heritage buildings would be maintained and redeveloped.

By the end of 2018, over 150 people had moved into the development, in the focus areas of artificial intelligence and machine learning, data analytics, cybersecurity, defence and space technology, and creative technology. An entrepreneurial hub known as FIXE@LotFourteen (Future Industries Exchange for Entrepreneurship at Lot Fourteen) had also been established.

On 12 December 2018, Prime Minister Scott Morrison officially announced that the Australian Space Agency, a department of the federal government, would be located at Lot Fourteen in 2019.

=== 2019 ===
In June 2019, Adelaide City Council raised concerns about the proposed exemption from paying rates by businesses on the site, after RenewalSA had announced plans for a proposed 250-room hotel at the site. Also in June, the state government announced an injection of federal funds, which made a total of A$551 million, known as the "Adelaide City Deal", much of which would be used on Lot Fourteen. By that time, there were a number of space-related companies already there or signed on, and plans for the Gallery for Aboriginal Art and Cultures, an International Centre for Food, Hospitality and Tourism Studies and an Indigenous Business Hub were being consolidated. The state government would be implementing a new governance arrangement for Lot Fourteen. The amount involved in the deal was reported as A$649 million in November 2020.

Canadian expert Ilse Treurnicht, formerly CEO of the MaRS Discovery District in Toronto, a not-for-profit innovation complex built on the site of an old hospital, was invited to submit recommendations to the government in September 2019, during a second visit arranged by the Don Dunstan Foundation. Among her recommendations was that the non-government sector should have a greater say in the management of the redevelopment. She also recommended establishing an independent board, which could consult widely and create cross-sector collaborations between government and business groups.

Tenants of the refurbished Hanson and Eleanor Harrald Buildings included Inovor Technologies (space technology) and Presagen (health technology) in June 2019, with a forecast of over a thousand people working there by the end of the summer season in 2020. Also in June, the independent not-for-profit innovation hub operator Stone & Chalk was commissioned to help start-ups at the site develop and grow and to provide advice to the government. They said that FIXE at Lot Fourteen would be launched by October. Grants, education, workspaces and other forms of support are designed to attract entrepreneurs to the site.

In July 2019, the Massachusetts Institute of Technology (MIT) agreed to collaborate on the development of a "Living Lab", enabling collaboration among the public, private and research sectors to determine the best ways for South Australia to plan both economic and sustainable population growth.

=== 2020 ===
The Australian Space Agency offices were officially opened on 19 February 2020 in the McEwin Building. The ASA is planning to "triple the size of the Australian space industry and create 20,000 new jobs by 2030".

Also February 2020, Premier and Minister of the Arts and Aboriginal Affairs Steven Marshall announced that the A$235 million Aboriginal Cultural Centre would open by 2023.

The Australian Cyber Collaboration Centre (A3C) was established in the Eleanor Harrald Building in July 2020.

In September 2020, Ireland-based professional services company Accenture announced that they would be establishing in hub in Adelaide, with premises at Lot Fourteen.

In November 2020, an extra A$50 million was allocated to the Aboriginal Art and Cultures Centre (AACC) in the 2020-2021 state budget, bringing the total amount to A$200 million for construction of the building. It is intended to use virtual reality and other digital technologies, and to create spaces for performances which would cater for "immersive interactive story-telling". Construction is scheduled to commence in 2021, with completion in 2024.

A$60 million of the Adelaide City Deal was earmarked for developing the International Centre for Food, Hospitality and Tourism Studies, with construction planned to begin in 2021. A new 16-storey building would house the Entrepreneurial and Innovation and Centre, scheduled for completion at the end of 2023.The Australian Institute for Machine Learning (AML) is located on the corner of North Terrace and Frome Road, an artificial intelligence research institute created collaboratively by the state government and the University of Adelaide.

The Stone & Chalk startup hub, housed in the old Allied Health Building, provides office space to 45 technology-focused enterprises, and also the MIT's bigdata Living Lab.

=== 2021 ===
In January, the Adelaide office of architectural firm Woods Bagot was commissioned to create the preliminary designs for the AACC.

During an outbreak of COVID-19 in Adelaide in July 2021, during the COVID-19 pandemic, SA Health opened a temporary COVID-19 testing centre on the site.

In October 2021, it was announced that the $60m International Centre for Food, Hospitality and Tourism Studies had been scrapped and the state government was looking at pursuing a hi-tech cyber education centre for the site at the back of the development. It was to have been Le Cordon Bleu's new Adelaide home, replacing the TAFE SA Regency Park International Centre, but apparently Le Cordon Bleu and TAFE SA were reluctant to move from their Regency Park site.

=== 2022 ===
In September 2022, it was announced that Airbus Defence and Space would be setting up a research facility at Lot Fourteen in October, responsible for developing new satellites for the Australian Defence Force. The company will work on the Defence Department's "Resilient Multi-mission Space STaR Shot" (RMS) program, which includes the development and launching of at least four satellites over the following eight years.

=== 2024 ===
On 30 September 2024 it was announced that the new Innovation Centre would be completed in 2027–8. A new master plan has scheduled the Innovation Centre to be the first new building as part of it, and as of this announcement, had 77 per cent of tenancies arranged. The newest one is BAE Systems, which will move from its current headquarters in Edinburgh, South Australia, bringing around 500 employees to the site.

== Tarrkarri ==
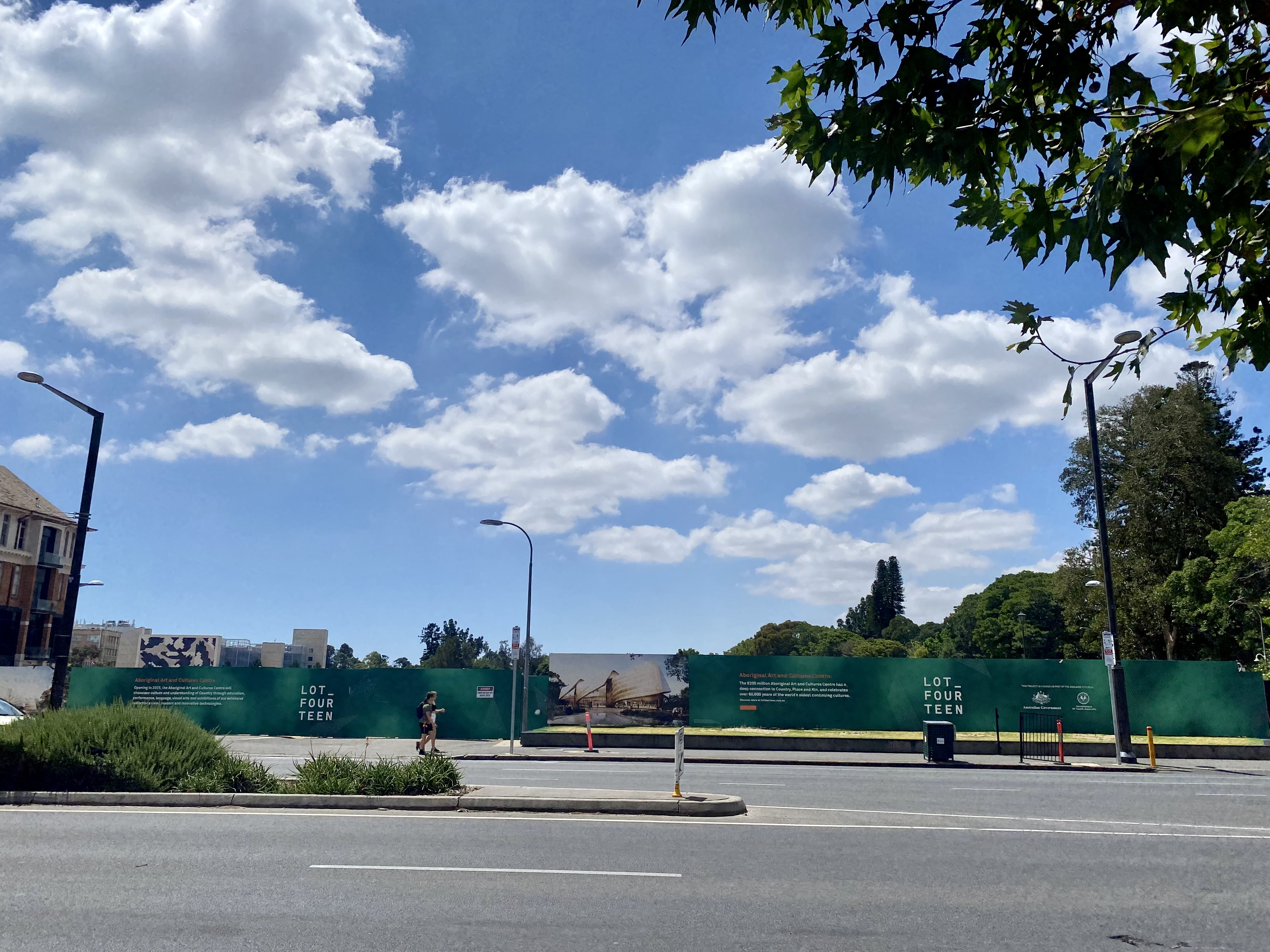
The Tarrkarri site, January 2023

In February 2020, Premier and Minister of the Arts and Aboriginal Affairs Steven Marshall announced that the A$235 million Aboriginal Cultural Centre would open by 2023, after long consultation with Indigenous communities, especially the local Kaurna people, resulting in improvements on the original plan. The South Australian Museum's collection of over 30,000 cultural artefacts, currently in storage, would form the centrepiece of the collection on public display, and it would also include artefacts and other forms of art sourced from not only within SA (including from Tandanya and the Art Gallery of South Australia), but also from around Australia, making it the most "comprehensive collection of Australian Aboriginal cultural material in the world", and the centrepiece of Lot Fourteen. The project was to be funded by the state government to the tune of A$150 million, and federal government by A$85 million. The word "national" had been dropped from the title of the new institution, from its title owing to competition with the Northern Territory, with both jurisdictions claiming their institutions would be firsts for Australia.

In December 2021, construction began on the Aboriginal Arts and Cultures Centre (AACC), which was assigned the name Tarrkarri, meaning "the future" in the Kaurna language. Kaurna ambassador for the centre, David Rathman, said that the A$200,000,000 build would provide jobs for local Aboriginal people, and that Aboriginal people would be consulted at all stages of the design and construction process.

Construction of the Tarrkarri building was halted in October 2022, pending a review of the costing and funding for the project.

A decision on the Tarrkarri Aboriginal centre was postponed until 2024, as the state government searched for philanthropic funding. After an initial cost estimate of $200m, a government-appointed panel led by Ken Wyatt and including Bob Carr and Australian Reserve Bank board member Carolyn Hewson, recommended in April 2023 that between $400 million to $600 million should be spent on the project in order to make Tarrkarri an internationally significant centre. The federal government had committed $85 million towards the project, while the SA Government had budgeted for a contribution of $115 million. By June 2023, the federal government had already spent $14.5 million on the project.

Despite the April 2023 review, the government had yet to release a full report by May 2024. Premier Peter Malinauskas said that the plans were being considered by cabinet, stating "It's potentially a very big project, it is an important site, culturally it's significant, so we just want to make sure we get it right". He said that all factors would need to be carefully weighed ahead of the June budget.

== Heritage buildings ==
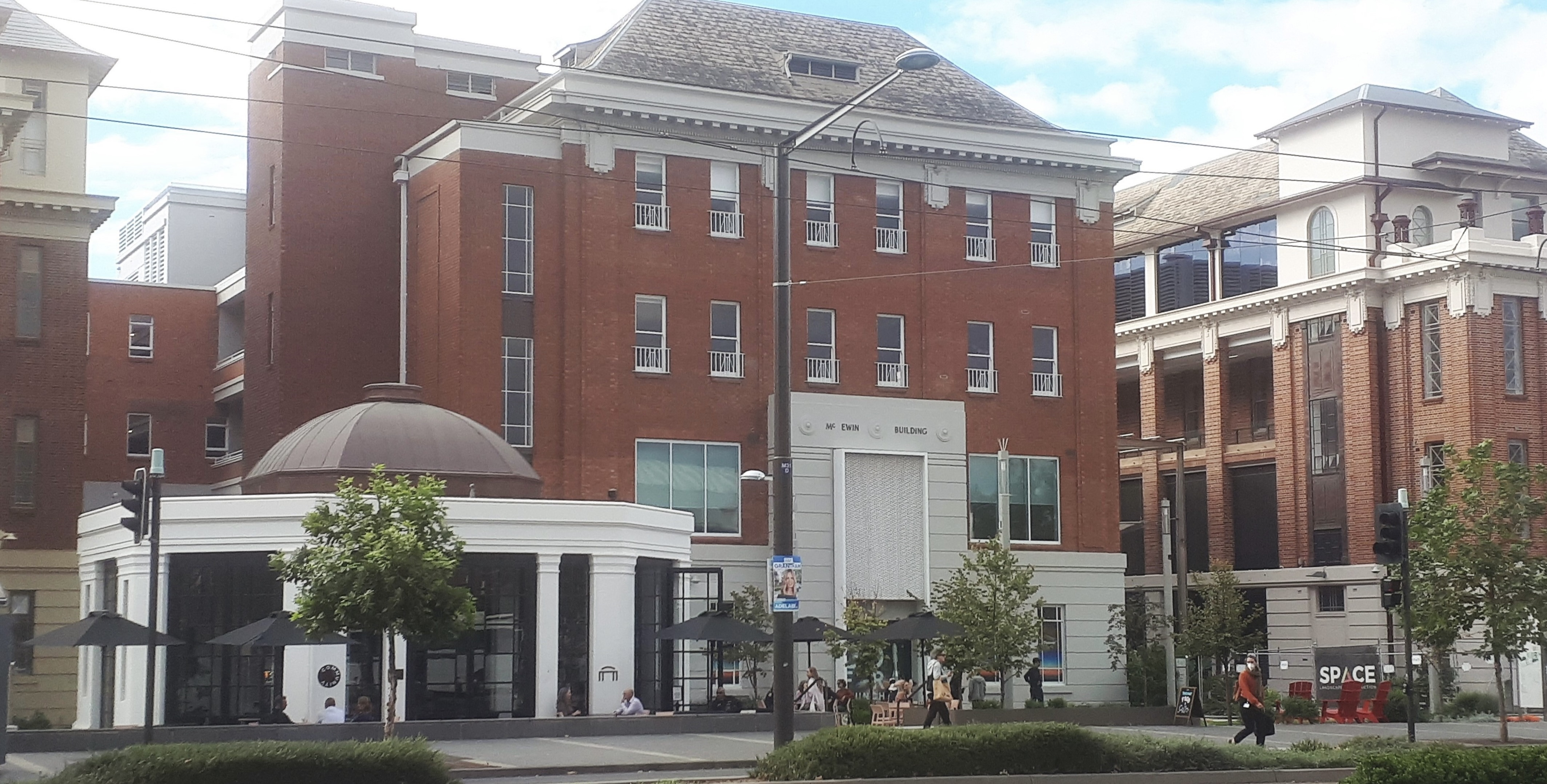
Sheridan Kiosk and McEwin Building

The Sheridan Kiosk was built in 1925 as a food kiosk to serve the hospital, named to honour early settlers John and Frances Keith Sheridan. BB Architects' restoration of the building put it in the running for both the City of Adelaide architectural prize and the David Saunders Award for Heritage Architecture in 2021.

The Hanson and Eleanor Harrald Buildings included Inovor Technologies (space technology) and Presagen (health technology) in June 2019, with a forecast of over a thousand people working there by the end of the summer season in 2020.

The Bice Building, McEwin Building, Women's Health centre and the Margaret Graham building were also renovated. Some parts are being used by the nearby University of Adelaide. The other buildings were/are being demolished.

== Sculpture ==
A new sculpture by Sundari Carmody, entitled One: all that we can see, is a 4 m (13 ft) wide a large tubular ring, fashioned from steel and with LED light at the top was unveiled in June 2022. The work was commissioned by Lot Fourteen, and is located in front of the Australian Space Discovery Centre.

== Tenants ==
Tenants at Lot Fourteen include:

- Australian Space Agency HQ, including Australian Space Discovery Centre, McEwin Building
- SmartSat Cooperative Research Centre, McEwin Building
- Australian Cyber Collaboration Centre
- Inovor Technologies (space technology)
- Australian Institute for Machine Learning, SW corner
- Stone & Chalk start-up hub, old Allied Health Building, housing the MIT's bigdata Living Lab, along with 45 other technology-focused enterprises
- Several defence-related enterprises, grouped under the Defence and Space Landing Pad
- Heavy Industry Low Carbon Transition Cooperative Research Centre (HILT CRC), "a collaborative venture that brings together industries, researchers, and government organisations to share the responsibility for the big shift of decarbonisation"
- Amazon Web Services
- Commonwealth Bank
- Bureau of Meteorology
- Cisco
- CORE, an innovation hub for the resources sector
- Myriota
- Optus
- Quantx
- Surrey Satellite Technology
- Salesforce
- The Circle First Nations Entrepreneur Hub
- No. 1 Space Surveillance Unit's Commercial Data Mission Centre

== See also ==
- Innovation Collaboration Centre
- South Australian Space Industry Centre
- ThincLab
