= No. 1 Remote Sensor Unit RAAF =

Royal Australian Air Force unit

No. 1 Remote Sensor Unit
- Active: 1 July 1992
- Branch: RAAF
- Role: Radar Surveillance
- Part of: No. 41 Wing
- Garrison/HQ: RAAF Base Edinburgh
- Motto: Nowhere to Hide

No. 1 Remote Sensor Unit (1RSU), formerly known as No. 1 Radar Surveillance Unit, was renamed on 2 May 2015. 1RSU is the Royal Australian Air Force unit responsible for operating the Jindalee Operational Radar Network (JORN). 1RSU is located at RAAF Base Edinburgh, Adelaide, South Australia.

== History and role ==
1RSU was established on 1 July 1992 to operate the initial JORN site at Alice Springs and moved to RAAF Base Edinburgh in 1999. During this period, Squadron Leader Raymond John Cage served as executive officer of the unit at Alice Springs and was awarded the Conspicuous Service Medal in the 1998 Australia Day Honours List for Outstanding Service. Cage later served as commanding officer of the unit during the introduction of JORN into operational service in 2002-03.

The JORN sites at Longreach and Laverton were commissioned in mid-2003. In addition to the JORN sites, 1RSU operates the JORN Coordination Centre at RAAF Base Edinburgh, which is responsible for providing JORN data to the system's 'customers', which include the Australian Strategic Theatre Joint Intelligence Centre and Northern Command.

1RSU was the first space operations unit in the Australian Defence Force. The unit remotely operated the C-Band Space Surveillance Radar and Space Surveillance Telescope installed at Naval Communication Station Harold E. Holt in Exmouth, Western Australia. Collectively, these systems provide a space situational awareness capability, allowing the tracking of space assets and debris 1RSU's space surveillance function was transferred to No. 1 Space Surveillance Unit in early 2023.
