= AIML =

AIML may refer to:

- All-India Muslim League, a political party in South-Asia
- Artificial Intelligence Markup Language, an XML dialect for creating natural language software agents
- Australian Institute for Machine Learning, a research institute in Adelaide, Australia
