= No. 1 Space Surveillance Unit =

Australian Defence Force unit

- Active: January 2023 - current
- Country: Australia
- Role: Space surveillance
- Part of: Space Command
- Location: RAAF Base Edinburgh
- Equipment: C-Band space surveillance radar Space surveillance telescope

No. 1 Space Surveillance Unit is a tri-service Australian Defence Force unit responsible for the Australian military's space surveillance capabilities. It was formed in January 2023 and has been part of Space Command since July 2023. It collaborates with the United States Space Force, with an American detachment forming part of 1SSU.

== History and role ==
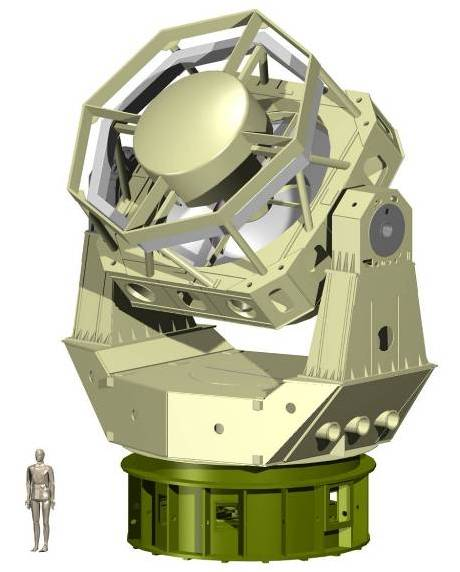
A depiction of the Space Surveillance Telescope which 1SSU operates

In 2010 the Australian and United States governments agreed to collaborate on space situational awareness. The two governments signed a memorandum of understanding on the issue in 2012, which included an agreement to establish a joint facility in Australia that would include a space radar and space telescope provided by the US. This aimed to fill a gap in the coverage of the United States Space Surveillance Network.

The joint space surveillance facility was established at Naval Communication Station Harold E. Holt in Western Australia. A C-Band space surveillance radar became operational in 2017 and a Space Surveillance Telescope entered service in 2022. This capacity was originally operated by No. 1 Remote Sensor Unit RAAF, which is also responsible for the Jindalee Operational Radar Network.

No. 1 Space Surveillance Unit (1SSU) was formed at RAAF Base Edinburgh in January 2023 as part of the Royal Australian Air Force. It became responsible for operating the space surveillance telescope and C-band radar, with initial support from No. 1 Remote Sensor Unit. 1SSU also operates a system to access data from the United States' Infrared Defense Satellite Program and Space-Based Infrared System which is downloaded at Joint Defence Facility Pine Gap in the Northern Territory. In July 2023 1SSU was transferred from the RAAF to the Australian Defence Force's Space Command.

The United States Space Force's Mission Delta 2 provides assistance to 1SSU. Mission Delta 2's Operating Location Bravo is stationed at RAAF Base Edinburgh and forms part of 1SSU.

1SSU also includes a Commercial Data Mission Centre (CDMC) that was established in 2023 at the Lot Fourteen facility in central Adelaide. The CDMC uses data from commercial space surveillance sensors to augment the ADF's capabilities. It also contributes to the United States' Joint Commercial Operations initiative.
