= Australian Cyber Collaboration Centre =

Australian organisation promoting collaboration in cyber security

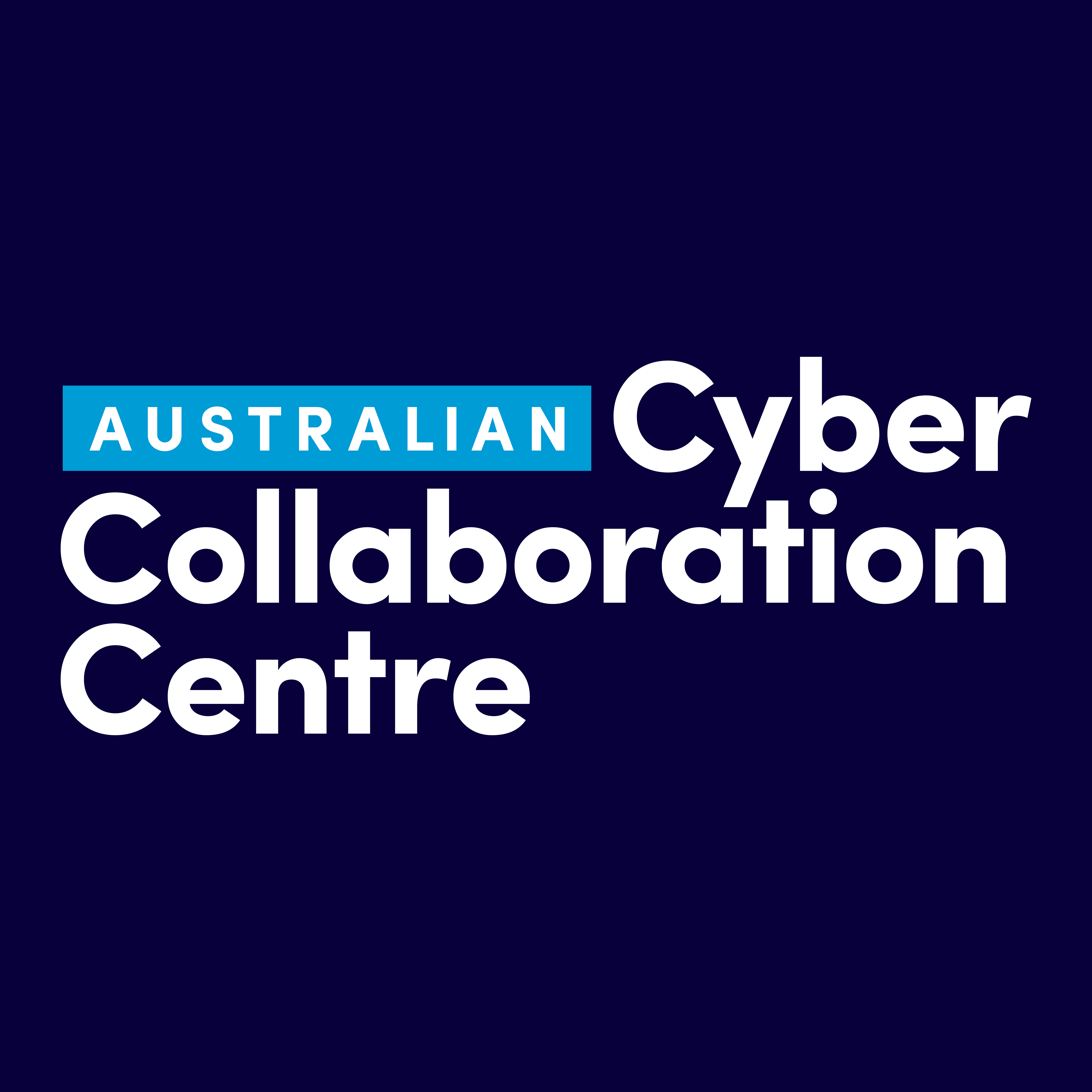
- Logo of the Australian Cyber Collaboration Centre

Agency overview
- Formed: 6 July 2020; 6 years ago
- Jurisdiction: South Australia
- Headquarters: TechCentral, Lot Fourteen, Frome Road, Adelaide
- Employees: 6
- Agency executive: Matthew Salier, Chief executive officer
- Parent agency: Department for Innovation and Skills
- Website: www.cybercollaboration.org.au

The Australian Cyber Collaboration Centre (Aus3C) is a not-for-profit organisation funded largely by Government of South Australia grants and based on collaboration of its member organisations, which focuses on cyber security. It is connected to the Department for Innovation and Skills and is located at Lot Fourteen in Adelaide, South Australia.

== History ==
The former Chief Information Security Officer of Western Australia Police, Hai Tran, was appointed as the inaugural Chief Executive Officer in June 2020, ahead of its official launch on 6 July 2020. at Lot Fourteen on North Terrace, Adelaide.

The centre was established in collaboration with the Federal and South Australian governments, as well as industry partners including BAE Systems Australia and Optus; academic institutions including University of South Australia, Flinders University, the University of Adelaide and TAFE SA; South Australia's Office for Cyber Security; Commonwealth's Defence Science & Technology Group; and the independent (partly government-funded) organisations AustCyber and the Cyber Security Cooperative Research Centre.

Before its opening, Aus3C had already launched a six-day pilot training course in collaboration with the University of Adelaide and aizoOn Australia, focused on digital forensics and incident response.

In November 2021, Aus3C extended its partnerships to include Cisco.

An invite-only panel discussion was organised by the Australian Cyber Collaboration Centre in November 2022 with the topic of Australia's Security of Critical Infrastructure Act. Participants at the panel included DTEX Systems, Department of Home Affairs, NBN Co, Providence Consulting Group, Mitre Corporation and the Commonwealth Bank.

== Role and responsibilities ==
The Aus3C's function is "to make cyberspace a better, and safer, place for organisations, corporations, agencies and institutions to do business".

Its work includes identifying vulnerabilities to cyber attacks; providing testing of all hardware and software components of IT systems (the Cyber Test Range); providing training in cyber security (the Cyber Training Academy); creating strategic and practical plans for implementing cyber security; and following progress and assessing the value of investments afterwards.

Training is an essential component of its work, as cybercrime affects about 25 per cent of businesses, South Australia is developing its defence, space and other technology industries, and there is a shortage of skilled workers in cyber security. In 2019 Minister of Innovation and Skills, David Pisoni forecasted up to 7,500 job opportunities in the ICT sector in the state in the next five years, of which 1500 would need cyber security skills.

Aus3C also focuses on small businesses which may not have large resources to protect themselves from cyber attacks, aiming to help them foster collaborations with other organisations which can help.

== Governance, funding and membership ==
The centre is under the ministerial responsibility of the Minister of Innovation and Skills, David Pisoni, and is overseen by a board. The inaugural chair is Kim Scott, director of TAO Consulting.

While most funding comes from government sources, the Commonwealth Bank is a major sponsor, and the Global Cyber Alliance is a partner to Aus3C.

The previous Chief Executive of the Australian Cyber Collaboration Centre was Mike Barber. Its approximately 40 members are drawn from academia, industry, cyber security and defence industry companies, government departments, equipment vendors and other membership bodies.

Effective 7 November 2022, the Australian Cyber Collaboration Centre appointed a new CEO, Matthew Salier. Matthew joined the Australian Cyber Collaboration Centre from RMIT University where he was the Director of the RMIT Cyber Ready Cloud Innovation Centre.
