= Australian Institute for Machine Learning =

Research institute in Adelaide, South Australia

- Front view of AIML, 2026
- Founder: Anton van den Hengel
- Established: 2018
- Focus: Artificial intelligence; machine learning; computer vision; deep learning
- Owner: Adelaide University
- Address: Lot Fourteen, 384–392 North Terrace, Adelaide, South Australia, Australia
- Coordinates: 34°55′15.18″S 138°36′28.91″E
- Interactive map of Australian Institute for Machine Learning
- Website: Official website

The Australian Institute for Machine Learning (AIML) is a research institute focused on artificial intelligence (AI), computer vision, deep learning and machine learning. It is based at the Lot Fourteen precinct in Adelaide, South Australia.

AIML is the largest university-based machine learning research group in Australia and is Australia's first institute dedicated to research in machine learning.

== History ==
AIML was established in 2018 as part of the University of Adelaide when it incorporated its Australian Centre for Visual Technologies (ACVT), led by Anton van den Hengel as the founding director. The Government of South Australia allocated A$7.1 million to support the institute's launch.

American aerospace and defence corporation Lockheed Martin was AIML's founding partner in 2018. Between then and 2021, AIML worked with 21 companies, improving their AI and machine learning capabilities and developing a number of new AI products. One of these was visual effects and animation business Rising Sun Pictures, with which it developed machine learning tools. Another partner is Acacia Systems, a defence technology company that specialises in data fusions and tactical tools. Microsoft also signed a memorandum of understanding with AIML in 2021 to collaboratively investigate how advanced cloud computing, AI, computer vision and machine learning can be applied in space.

AIML became a tenant at Lot Fourteen in 2020. Simon Lucey was appointed as director in October that year.

In 2021, AIML launched the Centre for Augmented Reasoning (CAR), a four-year A$20 million initiative funded by the federal Department of Education to advance machine learning research, under the leadership of Anton van den Hengel as CAR director. CAR aims to improve AI's ability to process human instructions and interactions through natural conversation and has provided funding and operational support to the Kingston AI Group of Australian AI professors.

In 2023, the Grains Research and Development Corporation (GRDC) awarded AIML A$1.9 million to develop machine learning capability for the University of Adelaide node of the Analytics for the Australian Grains Industry (AAGI).

In September 2024, the University of Adelaide announced a five-year partnership between AIML and the Commonwealth Bank of Australia (CommBank) to establish the CommBank Centre for Foundational AI Research with A$6 million in funding, aimed at advancing foundational AI research and capability in Australia.

In December 2024, AIML partnered with CSIRO's Data61 to launch the Responsible AI Research (RAIR) Centre, focusing on ethical AI development and governance. With A$20 million investment from the University of Adelaide, CSIRO and the South Australian Government, the RAIR Centre aims to address key challenges in responsible AI at a national and international scale. Javen (Qinfeng) Shi was appointed as Interim Director of the RAIR Centre in February 2025.

Also in 2024, AIML launched the Industrial AI Program, supported by A$12 million in funding from the Government of South Australia through the Department of State Development's Research and Innovation Fund. This program seeks to support AI adoption in industrial sectors in South Australia.

In 2026, AIML became an entity of Adelaide University following the merger between the University of Adelaide and the University of South Australia.

== Research ==
AIML operates on an open access model, making most of its research publicly available through conferences, journals and open source software. Its researchers apply machine learning across various industries, including but not limited to agriculture, medical imaging, manufacturing, mining and filmmaking. The institute's research spans various machine learning areas, such as robotic vision, trusted autonomous systems, surveillance and tracking, and photogrammetry and 3D modelling.

In 2022, AIML partnered with the Australian Strategic Policy Institute (ASPI) to create "Artificial intelligence: your questions answered", a collection of short papers that offer a primer into the world of AI and the opportunities and risks this technology presents to Australia. The papers were edited by AIML Institute Manager Kathy Nicholson and Adam Slonim.

In 2023, AIML partnered with the Australian Academy of Technological Sciences and Engineering (ATSE) to develop "Responsible AI: Your questions answered", a collection of short papers that aim to offer "an insight into the world of responsible artificial intelligence and the opportunities this presents to Australia."

AIML also explores AI applications in healthcare, focusing on ethical clinical implementation, biomarker discovery and predictive models for disease diagnosis, prognosis and treatment response. In 2025, Project CANAIRI (Collaboration for trANslational AI tRIals) was established by an international team led by AIML Deputy Director Melissa McCradden to test that AI tools function effectively and equitably in real-world healthcare settings.

In 2023 alone, AIML members authored 278 papers in international journals and conferences.

== Education ==
AIML is part of Adelaide University's School of Computer Sciences and Information Technology. Postgraduate students enrolled at the university can pursue research at AIML through programs such as the Master in Data Science, Master of AI & Machine Learning, Master of Philosophy or Doctor of Philosophy (PhD). Undergraduate students engage with AIML academics through courses in computer science and mathematical sciences. As of 2025, AIML is host to over 70 research students.

== Recognition and awards ==
AIML has ranked third globally for publications in well-known computer vision conferences and has achieved first place in international leaderboards, including Cityscapes, Visual Question Answering (VQA), the Retinal Fundus Glaucoma (REFUGE) challenge and Microsoft's Common Objects in Context (COCO) Captioning Challenge.

In 2024, Melissa McCradden, received a five-year Hospital Research Foundation Fellowship in Paediatric AI Ethics. That same year, the institute was awarded a A$48,500 Theo Murphy Initiative grant from the Australian Academy of Science. The grant is expected to fund efforts to establish a symposium to help support emerging researchers in responsible AI.

In 2025, AIML members along with members of the University of Adelaide's Robinson Research Institute, were awarded A$498,291 in funding from the Australia's Economic Accelerator (AEA) Ignite Grants as part of the IMAGENDO team. The IMAGENDO study is pioneering the use of AI and machine learning to reduce diagnostic delays for endometriosis.

Several AIML members have received awards and scholarships for their contributions across various fields:

Year	Award	Subject	Result	Ref.
2019	Google Research Scholarship	Zhi Tian	Won	
2020	Google Research Scholarship	Yifan Liu	Won	
2021	Google Research Scholarship	Xinlong Wang	Won	
2021	Excellence in Science and Industry Collaboration – South Australian Excellence and Innovation Awards	AIML Industry Solutions team	Won	
2022	South Australian Young Tall Poppy of the Year	Qi Wu	Won	
2023	Open Catalyst Challenge – NeurIPS Competition Track	Xinyu Li, Zhen Zhang, Anton van den Hengel, Javen Shi	Won	
2024	Channel 7 Young Achiever Award	Dhani Dharmaprani	Won	
2024	South Australian Young Tall Poppy of the Year	Wei Zhang	Won	
2024	Artificial Intelligence category – American Chamber of Commerce in Australia	Simon Lucey	Won	
2025	2025 Women Leading Tech Awards – Education/Research Category	Xinyu Zhang	Won	
2025	Westpac Future Leaders Scholarship	Zachary Shinnick	Won	

== See also ==
- University of Adelaide
- Lot Fourteen
