= Marko Biskupović =

Chilean footballer (born 1989)

Malo Biskupović
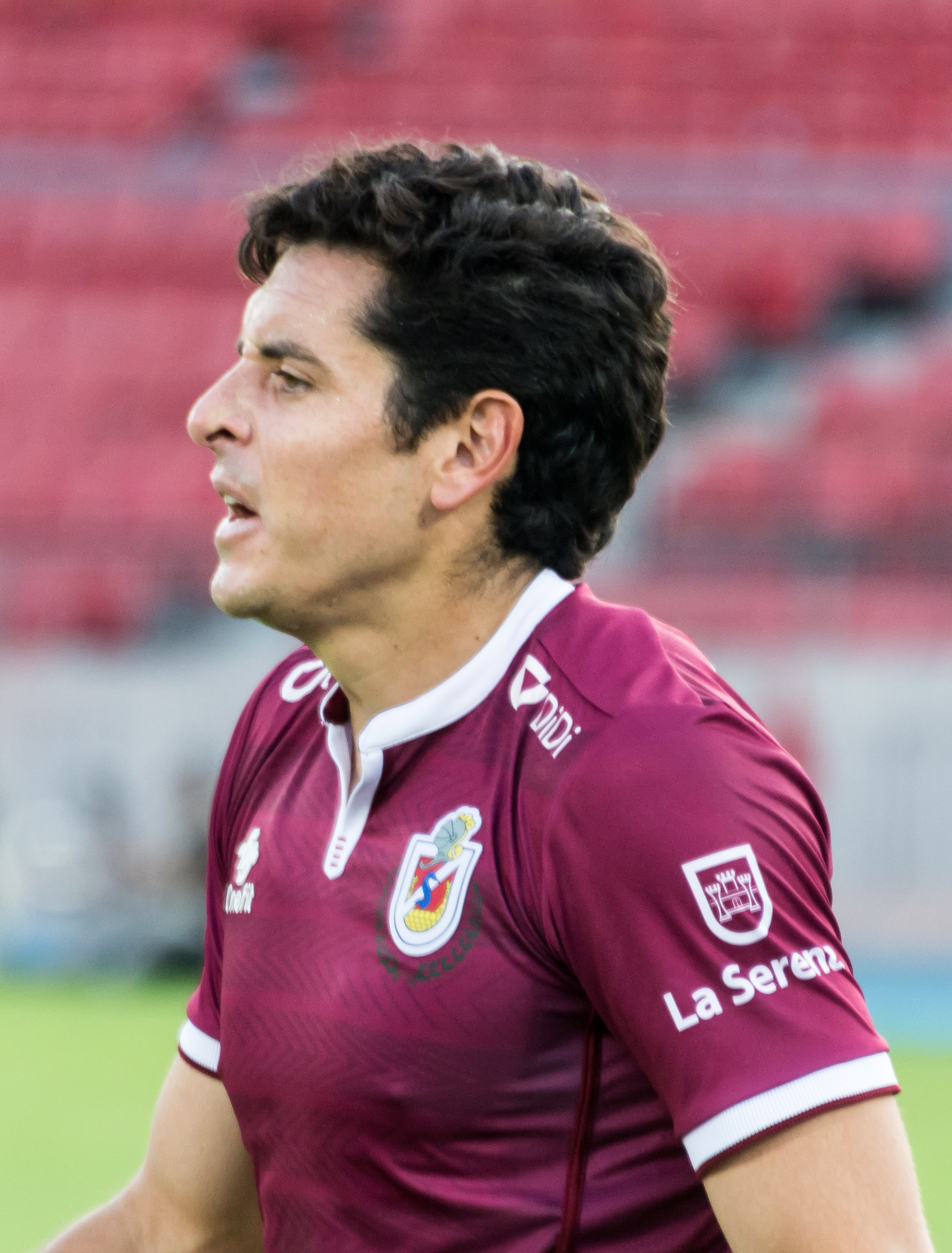
- Biskupović with Deportes La Serena in 2020

Personal information
- Full name: Malo Andrés Biskupović Venturino
- Date of birth: 30 June 1989 (age 37)
- Place of birth: Santiago, Chile
- Height: 1.88 m (6 ft 2 in)
- Position: Defender

Youth career
- 2007–2008: Universidad Católica

Senior career*
Years	Team	Apps	(Gls)
2009–2015	Universidad Católica	63	(2)
2010	→ Deportes Puerto Montt (loan)	3	(0)
2016–2017	Kalmar FF	46	(0)
2018	Unión La Calera	5	(0)
2019–2020	Deportes La Serena	30	(1)
2021	Magallanes	8	(0)
Total		92	(1)

International career
2012	Chile	2	(0)
- * Club domestic league appearances and goals

Malo Andrés Biskupović Venturino (born 30 June 1989) is a Chilean former footballer who played as a defender.

== International career ==
On 2012, he represented Chile in two matches against Peru. After winning both, Chile got the Copa del Pacífico.

== Managerial career ==
At the same time he was a footballer, he got a Master's degree in Big Data applied to the football at the Universidad Católica of Murcia and a bachelor's degree in Sport Management at the University College of Northern Denmark. In addition, he took courses of Sports Data Analytics at the Johan Cruyff Institute, Performance Analytics at the CONMEBOL and Football Clubs Management at the University of Palermo. He also served as a video scout for Danish club Midtjylland for about a year.

Immediately to his retirement from football, Biskupovic joined Football Federation of Chile to work as Head of Identification (ID), Scouting and Analytics of Chilean players around the world. During 2024, he also served as technical director and sport manager for all Chilean national teams.

In May 2025, Biskupovic moved to Russia as Deputy Sporting Director for Spartak Moscow.

== Personal life ==
He is married to Javiera Naranjo, a sports journalist who worked for Canal del Fútbol.

== Honours ==
Universidad Católica

- Copa Chile (1): 2011

Chile

- Copa del Pacífico (1): 2012
