= TAFE SA =

Vocational education provider in Australia

- Type: Technical and further education
- Established: 1971
- Affiliations: TAFE SA Adelaide Hills and Fleurieu; TAFE SA Adelaide Metropolitan; TAFE SA APY Lands; TAFE SA Barossa and Riverland; TAFE SA Eyre Peninsula; TAFE SA Far North; TAFE SA Limestone Coast; TAFE SA Yorke Peninsula and Mid North
- Location: South Australia, Australia
- Website: www.tafesa.edu.au

TAFE SA (Technical and Further Education South Australia) is an Australian education provider that was established in 2012. It provides vocational education and training in the state of South Australia.

TAFE SA conducts training across approximately 30 campuses as well as through regional training locations and online study.

== History ==
On 1 November 2012, TAFE SA became a statutory corporation, separate from the SA Government's Department of Further Education, Employment, Science and Technology, under the TAFE SA Act 2012.

In December 2017, following a random audit of TAFE SA courses by the Australian Skills Quality Authority (ASQA), 14 courses were found to have discrepancies in assessment processes, affecting approximately 630 students. The Weatherill government and Education Minister Susan Close announced support measures and compensation for affected students, who were individually case-managed.

In the years following the audit, TAFE SA undertook reforms intended to improve course quality, governance, industry engagement, and student outcomes. These included internal reviews, staff development, infrastructure upgrades, and curriculum improvements. By 2024, TAFE SA had been re-registered by ASQA as a training provider for the maximum allowable period of seven years.

That same year, TAFE SA was named Large Training Provider of the Year at the Australian Training Awards, with judges citing its turnaround and leadership in delivering high-quality vocational education and training at scale. The award highlighted TAFE SA's collaboration with industry and community, improved access to training, and innovative education delivery methods.

== Description ==
The acronym "TAFE" stands for Technical and Further Education. It is used and recognised nationally throughout Australia.

TAFE SA is a registered training organisation (RTO) and an Institute of Higher Education under the jurisdiction of the Australian Skills Quality Authority (ASQA) and, for higher education courses, the Tertiary Education Quality and Standards Agency (TEQSA). It is the largest provider of vocational education and training in South Australia, offering nationally accredited qualifications from entry-level certificates to bachelor's degrees across a wide range of industry areas.

As of 2024, TAFE SA was re‑registered by ASQA as an RTO and provider on the Commonwealth Register of Institutions and Courses for Overseas Students (CRICOS) for seven years—the longest accreditation period to date.

TAFE SA operates under a strategic plan and roadmap that emphasises connecting industry, communities, schools, employment facilitators, and government to efficiently meet current and emerging training needs. The plan includes curriculum innovation, flexible course scheduling, and tailored programs for small and medium enterprises, as well as micro‑credentials and short courses designed to support upskilling and career transitions.

== Academic programs ==
TAFE SA delivers nationally accredited training across a range of industries, including health and community services, business, construction and trades, information technology, hospitality, creative arts, and renewable energy.

Its qualifications span short courses, skill sets, certificate I through IV, diplomas, advanced diplomas, and bachelor's degrees. Some higher education qualifications are delivered in partnership with universities and are regulated by the Tertiary Education Quality and Standards Agency (TEQSA).

Training is designed in consultation with industry partners to align with workforce needs, and programs are regularly updated to meet current standards and technologies. Some programs also include workplace placements or simulated training environments, preparing students for direct entry into the workforce.

== Industry and education partnerships ==
TAFE SA collaborates with employers, government agencies, professional associations, and other education providers to ensure course content reflects current industry needs. These partnerships contribute to curriculum development, industry placements, and upskilling initiatives targeting both entry-level learners and experienced workers.

The organisation also partners with local councils, regional development authorities, and Indigenous organisations to expand training access across metropolitan, regional, and remote areas.

Notably, the Regency campus in Adelaide hosts the Artisan Cheese Making Academy Australia, Campus Brewery, and a training restaurant and function centre—examples of hands-on learning developed in collaboration with industry. TAFE SA also works with international education partners such as Le Cordon Bleu, based at the Regency site.

== Recognition and awards ==
In 2024, TAFE SA was named the "Large Training Provider of the Year" at the Australian Training Awards. The national award recognises excellence in the delivery of vocational education and training at a large scale, including quality teaching, innovation, and student outcomes.

TAFE SA has also been recognised through the South Australian Training Awards and other industry events for its student support programs and collaboration with employers.

== Administrative regions ==
TAFE SA campuses are divided into the following administrative areas:

- TAFE SA Adelaide Hills and Fleurieu
- TAFE SA Adelaide Metropolitan (covering campuses in Greater Adelaide)
- TAFE SA APY Lands
- TAFE SA Barossa and Riverland
- TAFE SA Eyre Peninsula
- TAFE SA Far North
- TAFE SA Limestone Coast
- TAFE SA Yorke Peninsula and Mid North

== Locations ==
=== Adelaide Metropolitan ===
The Adelaide Metropolitan group includes the following campuses:

- Adelaide, in Currie Street, Adelaide city centre
- Adelaide College of the Arts, at Light Square, Adelaide city centre
- Elizabeth
- Gilles Plains
- Noarlunga
- Regency, at Regency Park
- Salisbury
- Tonsley
- Urrbrae

The Regency campus includes the Regency International Centre, which includes three training outlets open to the public: the Graduates Function Centre, TIROS Restaurant, and Results Cafe. The Centre also includes the Artisan Cheese Making Academy Australia, the only training college dedicated to artisan cheese in Australia, and the Campus Brewery, a micro-brewery with associated plant. Le Cordon Bleu hotel management and culinary arts college, launched in 1992, is also based at the Regency campus, and is partnered with both TAFE SA and the University of South Australia.

=== Adelaide Hills and Fleurieu ===
The Adelaide Hills and Fleurieu group includes the following campuses:

- Mount Barker
- Victor Harbor

The Mount Barker campus has pathway courses for the following: hospitality, nursing, literacy, and numeracy.

The Victor Harbor campus has study areas for the following courses: aged/disability service, business, management, and administration.

== See also ==
- Education in Australia
