= Department of State Development (South Australia) =

Agency overview
- Formed: 1 July 2014
- Preceding agencies: Department of Further Education, Employment, Science and Technology; Department for Manufacturing, Innovation, Trade, Resources and Energy
- Superseding agency: Department for Innovation and Skills
- Jurisdiction: State of South Australia
- Employees: 4500
- Agency executive: Mark Duffy, Chief Executive

The Department of State Development was a former department of the Government of South Australia. The department was created by the Weatherill government on 1 July 2014 out of the former DFEEST, Department for Manufacturing, Innovation, Trade, Resources and Energy and select groups from a few other agencies, including Arts South Australia.

By 2019, under the Marshall government (elected 2018), most of its functions had been taken over by the Department for Innovation and Skills.
