= Le Cordon Bleu (Adelaide) =

Le Cordon Bleu Adelaide
- Established: 1992
- Location: Regency Park, Adelaide, South Australia, Australia
- Campus: TAFE Regency Park
- Website: www.cordonbleu.edu/adelaide/home/en

Le Cordon Bleu is a hotel management and culinary arts college in Adelaide, South Australia.

The college opened in 1992 where it was first known as the International College of Hotel Management in Adelaide. This is the first one, out of the 3 existing campuses in Australia as of 2022. The school originally offered an International Diploma of Hotel Management at first, but they expanded to provide both vocational studies and higher education in the culinary fields.

Le Cordon Bleu Adelaide is located on the Regency Park campus of TAFE SA and is the head office of Le Cordon Bleu Australia. As of 2021, the college was exploring plans to relocate more centrally. The Government of South Australia had been planning to build a new A$60-million International Centre for Food, Hospitality and Tourism Studies at Lot Fourteen on North Terrace in Adelaide city centre, incorporating the Regency International Centre, but those plans were scrapped by October 2021. It was reported that Le Cordon Bleu and TAFE SA were reluctant to move from their Regency Park site and give way to the mentioned governmental projects.

Its programs lead to wide-range of educational qualifications, offering programs for certificates to master's degrees. The college is registered on the CRICOS to offer programs for overseas students as per the ESOS Act 2000, and is partnered with both TAFE SA and the University of South Australia.
