= Space Surveillance Telescope =

Telescope for detecting orbital debris, located in Exmouth, Western Australia

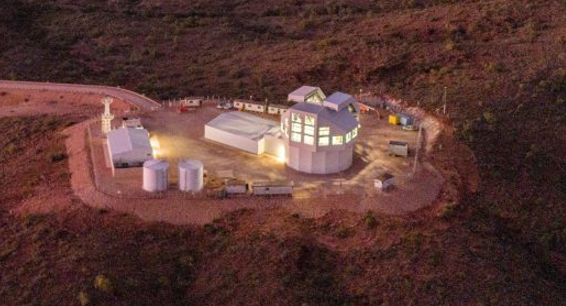
- Space Surveillance Telescope
- Alternative names: SST
- Location(s): Exmouth, Western Australia, AUS
- Coordinates: 21°53′44″S 114°05′24″E
- First light: 2011, 2020
- Diameter: 3.5 m (11 ft 6 in)
- Location of Space Surveillance Telescope
- Related media on Commons

The Space Surveillance Telescope (SST) is a Southern Hemisphere-based United States Space Force telescope used for detecting, tracking, and cataloguing satellites, near-Earth objects, and space debris.

In 2011, SST achieved first light at the White Sands Missile Range, New Mexico, United States. In 2017, the SST was dismantled and moved to the Harold E. Holt Naval Communication Station, Exmouth, Western Australia to a site with an altitude of around 65 metres (213 ft). From there it began observing the Southern Celestial Hemisphere and collecting data for the US Space Surveillance Network. The repositioned SST achieved first light in Australia on 5 March 2020. The SST entered initial operational capability on 4 October 2022 and was originally operated by the Royal Australian Air Force's, 1 Remote Sensor Unit under the command and control (C2) of the U.S. Space Force. No. 1 Space Surveillance Unit assumed responsibility for operating the SST in early 2023.

== Purpose ==
The SST primarily enables the military to track and identify objects and threats in space including space debris, as well as predict and avoid potential collisions. Whether it is space traffic management or the protection of critical space-based capabilities, SST maintains real-time awareness of the space domain of both the U.S. and Australia. The discovery and tracking of space debris is a growing problem. Among the 20–30 thousand large objects in orbit that are tracked, an estimated 100 million objects some as small as paint flecks are harder to track than the larger objects, but large enough to shield against if they collide with a space asset. Paint flecks are known to cause damage mainly due to the extreme velocity that they travel in orbit. In other words, there are objects too big to easily shield against, but too small to track. Another concern is the Kessler syndrome, a chain reaction of collisions, creating far more space debris dangerous to working satellites. Another concern are near-Earth asteroids, that the SST also tracks as part of its mission.

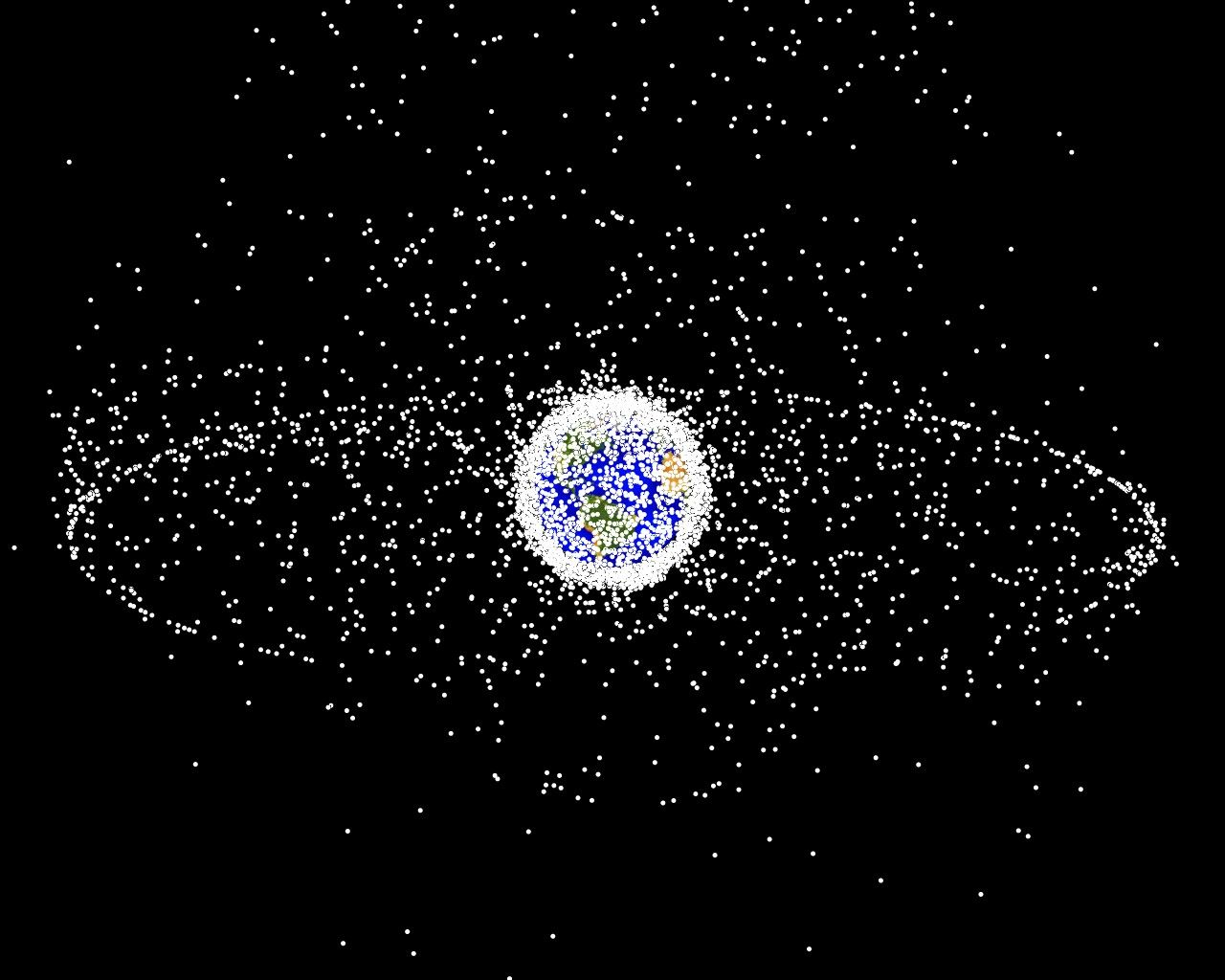
A computer-generated image representing space debris as could be seen from high Earth orbit. The two main debris fields are the ring of objects in geosynchronous Earth orbit (GEO) and the cloud of objects in low Earth orbit (LEO).

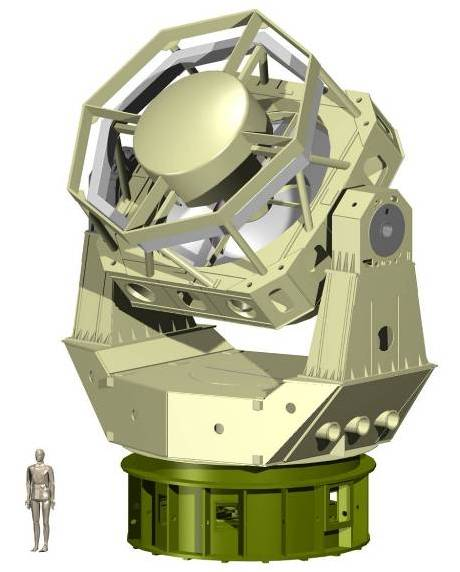
Space Surveillance Telescope

== Design ==
The SST was sponsored by DARPA and designed by the Massachusetts Institute of Technology Lincoln Laboratory.

SST has a 3.5-meter-aperture (140 in) mirror. Two noted design features include a Mersenne-Schmidt type optics and curved CCD. The large curved focal surface array sensors are considered to be an innovative design. It encompasses improvements in detection sensitivity, has short focal length, wide field of view, and improvements in step-and-settle abilities. (Note: DARPA Privacy and Security notice #2: Except where otherwise noted, information presented on the DARPA Web Information Service is considered public information and may be distributed or copied. Use of appropriate byline/photo/image credits is requested.)

SST detects, tracks, and can discern small, obscure objects, in deep space with a "wide field of view system". It is a single telescope with the dual abilities. First the telescope is sensitive enough to allow for detection, also, of small, dimly lit objects (low reflectivity). Second it is capable of quickly searching the visible sky. This combination is a difficult achievement in a single telescope design.

It is a Mersenne-Schmidt design with an F/1.0 aperture and a 3.5-metre (11 ft) primary mirror. It uses an array of charge-coupled device (CCD) sensors, arranged on a curved focal plane array. The SST mount uses an advanced servo-control technology, that makes it one of the quickest and most agile telescopes of its size. It has a field of view of 6 square degrees and can scan the visible sky at night on clear nights down to apparent magnitude 20.5. These features allow the system to conduct multiple searches throughout the night, including the entire geostationary belt within its field.

As a telescope system, it can give precise locations of discovered objects, extrapolate the courses of individual objects and determine their stability.

The SST is notable in the number of observations it makes and is currently listed by the Minor Planet Center as the world record holder for making the most observations in a single year. In 2015 it made a record 6.97 million observations, significantly more than any other telescope, including Pan-STARRS which is currently in second place, having recorded 5.25 million observations in its best year so far (2014).

== See also ==
- United States Space Surveillance Network
- List of largest optical reflecting telescopes
- Space debris
- Near-earth objects
- Satellites
- Asteroid impact prediction
