= The Hospital Research Foundation =

Australian non-governmental organisation

- Founded: 1 January 1965
- Type: Non-governmental organisation
- Purpose: Fund raising and investment in medical research
- Location: Woodville, South Australia
- Region served: Australia
- Product: Medical research
- Members: 12
- Key people: Chair - Stephen Rodda; Chief Executive Officer - Paul Flynn
- Employees: ~20
- Website: hospitalresearch.org.au
- Formerly called: The Queen Elizabeth Hospital Research Foundation Incorporated

The Hospital Research Foundation, founded in 1965, is an Australian non-governmental organisation established to support the leading medical and health research conducted at The Queen Elizabeth Hospital and the Basil Hetzel Institute for Translational Health Research to improve the health of the South Australian community.

The foundation supports medical research through major program grants, research grants, the purchase of laboratory equipment, and by providing financial support and scholarships to postgraduate, honours and vacation research students.

Major areas of revenue to support medical research are:

- Donations
- Lotteries
- Fund-raising events
- Bequests

== History ==
The foundation (originally called The Queen Elizabeth Hospital Research Foundation) was established in 1965, and was one of the first of its kind in South Australia.

In 2010 The Hospital Research Foundation established the brand and logo in use today. The tag line, "finding cures, improving care" is an integral part of the logo and summarises the core purpose and focus of the foundation.

== Programs ==
=== Australian Breast Cancer Research ===
Focused on supporting research into the detection, management and treatment of breast cancer and in turn, help reduce the impact of this cancer upon Australian families. The research funded is both clinical and laboratory based.

=== Australian Prostate Cancer ===
Established to assist with the funding of vital medical research into the detection and treatment of prostate cancer, as well as preventing the spread of the disease. This program funds clinical and laboratory based research conducted at the Basil Hetzel Institute for Translational Health Research and The Queen Elizabeth Hospital in South Australia.

=== Australian Heart Research ===
Focused on the optimum delivery of disease prevention strategies, improved diagnostics, treatments and hospital care to patients around Australia.

=== Kidney, Transplant & Diabetes Research Australia (KTDRA) ===
Kidney, Transplant & Diabetes Research Australia (KTDRA) support medical research aimed at improving the lives of people suffering with these diseases. KTDRA's aim is to reduce and ultimately eliminate the high incidence of these chronic diseases in Australia and around the world.

=== Centre for Creative Health ===
The Centre for Creative Health is driving collaboration, innovation and research to develop best-practice arts, design and health programs to improve the quality and experience of healthcare for patients, families and staff at the new Royal Adelaide Hospital (RAH) in Adelaide, as well as the wider community.

=== The Road Home ===
The Road Home supports health and wellbeing research and programs for veterans, emergency service personnel and their families.

=== Cure For Stroke Australia (CFSA) ===
CFSA supports research undertaken through the Stroke Research Programme (SRP), a unique collaboration between the South Australian Health and Medical Research Institute (SAHMRI), University of Adelaide, the Central Adelaide Local Health Network (CALHN) and the Basil Hetzel Institute for Translational Health Research (BHI). The SRP has been instrumental in helping establish dedicated Stroke Treatment Units at major hospitals in Adelaide including the Royal Adelaide Hospital (RAH), The Queen Elizabeth Hospital (TQEH) and the Lyell McEwin Hospital (LMH). Research conducted by the SRP is helping to improve response times and health outcomes for individuals who have a stroke. Through innovative research the SRP is also striving to discover new therapies to overcome disability following stroke.

=== Under Our Roof ===
Under Our Roof project provides accommodation for country cancer patients receiving treatment at The Queen Elizabeth Hospital, one of South Australia's busiest cancer treatment centres. It also has the state's largest breast cancer clinic. Fund raising for the program has been supported by the Mercer SuperCycle.

== Publications ==
Research for life
