= Anton van den Hengel =

Australian computer scientist (born 1970)

- van den Hengel in 2025
- Born: 1970 (age 55–56); Ede, Netherlands
- Citizenship: Australian
- Education: University of Adelaide: BMathCompSci (1992), LLB (1993), MCompSci (1994), PhD (2000)
- Known for: Visual question answering, vision-and-language navigation, visual recommender systems
- Scientific career
- Fields: Computer vision, machine learning

Anton van den Hengel (born 1970) is an Australian computer scientist. He is a Professor and the Chief Scientist at the Australian Institute for Machine Learning (AIML) at Adelaide University, Director of AIML's Centre for Augmented Reasoning, and Founder and Chair of the Kingston AI Group, a body of Australia's leading professors of artificial intelligence. He is also a Fellow of the Australian Academy of Technology and Engineering (ATSE), a Fellow of the Royal Society of South Australia, and CEO of Metacognition, an Adelaide-based startup that builds persistent memory and reasoning layers for AI models. He was the Director of AIML from 2018 to 2022, and previously spent four years as Director of Applied Science at Amazon. His research covers computer vision and machine learning, with contributions in the areas of visual question answering, vision-and-language navigation and visual recommender systems.

== Education ==
Van den Hengel holds a Bachelor of Mathematical and Computer Science (1992), a Bachelor of Laws (1993), a Master's in Computer Science (1994), and a PhD in Computer Vision (2000), all from the University of Adelaide.

== Career ==
=== Academic and research leadership ===
Van den Hengel joined the University of Adelaide as a lecturer in 1996 as a lecturer, then as Associate Professor in 2007 and Professor in 2009 onwards. From 2006 to 2017 he directed the Australian Centre for Visual Technologies (ACVT), and from 2014 to 2020, he was a Chief Investigator with the Australian Research Council (ARC) Centre of Excellence for Robotic Vision. In 2018 he founded AIML at the University of Adelaide and served as its Director until 2022. Under his direction the institute grew from a small research group to the largest university-based machine learning research group in Australia. He became AIML's Chief Scientist in 2024 and has continued in this role following the merger between the University of Adelaide and the University of South Australia to form Adelaide University in January 2026. Since 2021, he has directed AIML's Centre for Augmented Reasoning, established to develop high-calibre machine learning expertise in Australia.

=== Industry ===
Between 2020 and 2023, van den Hengel was Director of Applied Science at Amazon, where he founded the company's machine learning research group in Australia. Punchcard, where van den Hengel served as Managing Director, commercialised Videotrace, an image-based 3D modelling tool. Van den Hengel and Henry Detmold were co-founders of Snap Network Surveillance, a video-surveillance analytics company, that attracted a six-figure investment in venture funding in 2011. In 2025 he founded Metacognition, of which he is CEO. In 2026, the company received A$10 million in pre-seed funding from Australian venture capital firm Main Sequence. Working with the Australian medical technology company LBT Innovations, his team at AIML also developed the Automated Plate Assessment System (APAS), a system for automated reading of microbiology culture plates. In 2019, APAS received first-in-class Class II clearance from the United States Food and Drug Administration.

He has held eight commercialised patents.

== Research ==
Van den Hengel's research is concentrated in computer vision and machine learning. Areas in which his work is most frequently cited include:

- Deep learning: van den Hengel's group at AIML has published widely cited work in deep learning for image recognition, including two first-place results on the 2016 and 2017 Cityscapes semantic segmentation benchmark, and a fourth-place finish in the 2015 ImageNet Detection Challenge.
- Vision-and-language navigation: in 2018, van den Hengel and collaborators published one of the first papers formalising vision-and-language navigation, the task of enabling a robotic agent to follow natural-language instructions through a real environment, along with an accompanying dataset. The paper has been cited more than 2,100 times.
- Visual recommender systems: in 2015, van den Hengel and collaborators published work using product appearance to generate purchase recommendations, an approach subsequently adopted across online retail; the paper received the ACM SIGIR Test of Time Award in 2025.
- Visual question answering: van den Hengel and his research group at AIML have published extensively on methods that answer natural-language questions about image content, and his group led a team alongside Microsoft and Stanford University that won the 2017 Visual Question Answering (VQA) 2.0 Challenge.
- Machine learning theory: van den Hengel and collaborators have published analyses questioning the mathematical assumptions underlying established machine learning techniques, including work on random projection methods and on sparse representations in face recognition.
- Video surveillance and image-based modelling: his earlier research addressed multi-camera surveillance analytics, later commercialised through Snap Network Surveillance, and interactive techniques for generating 3D models from video, commercialised as Videotrace in 2009.

As of September 2026, van den Hengel has an h-index of 94 and more than 47,000 citations across over 450 publications.

Van den Hengel has been chief investigator on more than A$80 million in research funding over his career. Major awards include the A$19 million ARC Centre of Excellence for Robotic Vision (2014–2020), A$20 million in federal funding for the Centre for Augmented Reasoning (2021–2025), and A$7.1 million from the South Australian Government to establish AIML (2018–2022).

== Awards and honours ==
- CVPR Best Paper Prize, IEEE (2010)
- Pearcey Award for Innovation in ICT, Pearcey Foundation (2010)
- SA Science Excellence Award for Research Collaboration, South Australian Department of State Development (2017)
- Fellow, Australian Academy of Technology and Engineering (2020)
- Outstanding Service Award for Leadership in AI, Australasian AI Awards (2021)
- Fellow, Royal Society of South Australia (2023)
- Best Paper Award, ACM International Conference on Multimedia (2024)
- ACM SIGIR Test of Time Award (2025)

== Public policy and advocacy ==
In 2023, van den Hengel founded and currently chairs the Kingston AI Group, which brings together 14 leading AI professors from eight Australian universities alongside the Chair of Robotics Australia Group. The group aims to provide research leadership and advice to government on artificial intelligence policy, and its members also work with companies to develop commercial AI applications. In March 2026, the group held its inaugural Kingston AI Symposium at Adelaide Oval.

Van den Hengel has contributed to Australian government AI policy development, including work on the Australian Academy of Technology and Engineering's report on Australia's AI readiness and the Australian Chief Scientist's Rapid Response Information Report on generative AI. He has given evidence to the federal Senate Select Committee on Adopting AI, the federal Senate Select Committee on the Future of Work and Workers, and sits on the organising committee of the B-Team AI Coalition.

He gives several talks a year to various bodies including the media.

== Early life ==
Van den Hengel was born in Ede, in the Netherlands, in 1970, to a Dutch father and an Australian mother. His father's family came from the Jordaan district of Amsterdam, where his grandparents ran a chicken shop; his father was one of five children born towards the end of the Second World War and was the only sibling to attend high school, later joining the army. His mother was born in Henley Beach, South Australia, and grew up in Port Adelaide, a family line that traced back several generations in the area; she met van den Hengel's father while travelling in Europe after training as a teacher in Adelaide.

The family emigrated to Australia in 1974, when van den Hengel was four, initially living with his maternal grandparents in Glandore in South Australia before moving into a house his parents built in Blackwood in the Adelaide Hills. He attended schools in several locations, including Kadina in regional South Australia, the Seychelles in East Africa, and Columbus, Ohio, in the United States, before returning to Blackwood. He was the first member of his father's family to attend university.

== Selected publications ==
- Anderson, P., Wu, Q., Teney, D., Bruce, J., Johnson, M., Sünderhauf, N., Reid, I., Gould, S. and van den Hengel, A. (2018). "Vision-and-language navigation: Interpreting visually-grounded navigation instructions in real environments." Proceedings of the IEEE Conference on Computer Vision and Pattern Recognition, 3674–3683.
- McAuley, J., Targett, C., Shi, Q. and van den Hengel, A. (2015). "Image-based recommendations on styles and substitutes." Proceedings of the 38th International ACM SIGIR Conference on Research and Development in Information Retrieval, 43–52.
- van den Hengel, A., Dick, A., Thormählen, T., Ward, B. and Torr, P. H. S. (2007). "VideoTrace: rapid interactive scene modelling from video." ACM Transactions on Graphics, 26(3), 86.
- Wu, Q., Wang, P., Shen, C., Dick, A. and van den Hengel, A. (2016). "Ask me anything: Free-form visual question answering based on knowledge from external sources." Proceedings of the IEEE Conference on Computer Vision and Pattern Recognition, 4622–4630.
- Lin, G., Shen, C., van den Hengel, A. and Reid, I. (2016). "Efficient piecewise training of deep structured models for semantic segmentation." Proceedings of the IEEE Conference on Computer Vision and Pattern Recognition, 3194–3203.
