= Department of Treasury and Finance (South Australia) =

Department of the South Australian government

Department overview
- Jurisdiction: South Australia
- Headquarters: State Administration Centre, 200 Victoria Square, Adelaide
- Employees: ▼1,195 (2023)
- Annual budget: ▼$262.7 million (2022/2023)
- Minister responsible: Stephen Mullighan, Treasurer of South Australia
- Department executive: Rick Persse, Under Treasurer
- Website: www.treasury.sa.gov.au

The Department of Treasury and Finance (DTF) is a department of the Government of South Australia. It is responsible for providing financial services to the state and giving advice to the ministry on economic and fiscal matters. It primarily supports the Treasurer of South Australia in managing the state's finances.

The Office for Artificial Intelligence, established in July 2025, is within the Department of Treasury and Finance.

== See also ==
- Government of South Australia
- List of South Australian government agencies
