= Australian Training Awards =

The Australian Training Awards are the peak national awards for the vocational education and training (VET) sector, recognising organisations, registered training organisations and individuals for their contribution to skilling Australia.

There are 18 Australian Training Award categories. A majority of categories articulate from the state or territory training awards with the remainder available by direct entry to the Australian Training Awards.

== Award Categories ==
=== Organisations ===
- Small Employer of the Year Award
- Medium Employer of the Year Award
- Employer of the Year Award
- Small Training Provider of the Year Award
- Large Training Provider of the Year Award
- Industry Collaboration Award
- International Training Provider of the Year Award
- Australian Apprenticeships - Employer Award
- School Pathways to VET Award

=== Individuals ===
- Australian School-based Apprentice of the Year Award
- Vocational Student of the Year Award
- Aboriginal and Torres Strait Islander Student of the Year Award
- Australian Apprentice (Trainee) of the Year Award
- Australian Apprentice of the Year Award
- VET Teacher/Trainer of the Year Award
- Excellence in Language, Literacy and Numeracy Practice Award
- National Achievement Award
- Lifetime Achievement Award
