= Department of Further Education, Employment, Science and Technology =

Former South Australian government authority

Department of Further Education, Employment, Science and Technology (DFEEST)

Agency overview
- Jurisdiction: State of South Australia
- Employees: 3,000
- Agency executives: Tom Kenyon, Minister for Employment, Higher Education and Skills and Minister for Science and Information Economy; Raymond Garrand, Chief Executive
- Website: www.dfeest.sa.gov.au/

The Department of Further Education, Employment, Science and Technology (DFEEST) was an agency of the Government of South Australia whose responsibilities included:

- coordinating high quality public vocational education and training
- building skills through workforce planning and skills development programs
- increasing the workforce development and planning culture in South Australian workplaces
- fostering innovation through science and research
- Information Economy

== Closure ==
DFEEST ceased as of 1 July 2014 when all functions were rolled into the new Department of State Development.

== External sources ==
- Home page, Accessed 2014-11-24
