= Jindalee Operational Radar Network =

Over-the-horizon radar network in Australia

The JORN area of operation

The Jindalee Operational Radar Network (JORN) is an over-the-horizon radar (OHR) network operated by the Royal Australian Air Force (RAAF) that can monitor air and sea movements across 37,000 square kilometres (14,000 sq mi). It has a normal operating range of 1,000–3,000 kilometres (620–1,860 mi). The network is used in the defence of Australia, and can also monitor maritime operations, wave heights, and wind directions.

JORN's main ground stations comprise a control centre, known as the JORN Coordination Centre (JCC), at RAAF Base Edinburgh in South Australia and three transmission stations: Radar 1 near Longreach, Queensland, Radar 2 near Laverton, Western Australia and Radar 3 near Alice Springs, Northern Territory.

== History ==
The roots of the JORN can be traced back to post World War II experiments in the United States and a series of Australian experiments at DSTO Edinburgh, South Australia beginning in the early 1950s.

In 1969, The Technical Cooperation Program membership and papers by John Strath prompted development of a core Over the Horizon radar project.

From July 1970 a study was undertaken; this resulted in a proposal for a program to be carried out, in three phases, to develop an over-the-horizon-radar system.

=== Geebung ===
Phase 1, Project Geebung, aimed to define operational requirements for an OHR and study applicable technologies and techniques. The project carried out a series of ionospheric soundings evaluating the suitability of the ionosphere for the operation of an OTHR.

=== Jindalee ===
Phase 2, Project Jindalee, aimed at proving the feasibility and costing of OHR. This second phase was carried out by the Radar Division, (later, the High Frequency Radar Division), of the Defence Science and Technology Organisation (DSTO). Project Jindalee came into being during the period 1972–1974 and was divided into three stages.

Stage 'A' commenced in April 1974. It involved the construction of a prototype radar receiver at Mount Everard, (near Alice Springs), a transmitter (at Harts Range, 160 kilometres or 99 miles away) and a beacon in Derby. When completed (in October 1976) the Stage A radar ran for two years, closing in December 1978. Stage A formally ended in February 1979, having achieved its mission of proving the feasibility of OTHR. The success of stage A resulted in the construction of a larger stage 'B' radar, drawing on the knowledge gained from stage A.

Stage 'B' commenced on 6 July 1978. The new radar was constructed next to the stage A radar. Developments during stage B included real time signal processing, custom built processors, larger antenna arrays, and higher power transmitters, which resulted in a more sensitive and capable radar.

- The first data was received by stage B in the period April–May 1982,
- the first ship was detected in January 1983, and
- an aircraft was automatically tracked in February 1984.

Trials were carried out with the Royal Australian Air Force during April 1984, substantially fulfilling the mission of stage B, to demonstrate an OHR operating in Australia. Another two years of trials were carried out before the Jindalee project officially finished in December 1985.

Stage 'C' became the conversion of the stage B radar to an operational radar. This stage saw substantial upgrades to the stage B equipment followed by the establishment of No. 1 Radar Surveillance Unit RAAF (1RSU) and the handover of the radar to 1RSU. The aim was to provide the Australian Defence Force with operational experience of OHR.

=== JORN ===
==== Phase 3 ====
Phase 3 of the OTHR program was the design and construction of the JORN. The decision to build the JORN was announced in October 1986. Telecom Australia, in association with GEC-Marconi, became the prime contractor and a fixed price contract for the construction of the JORN was signed on 11 June 1991. The JORN was to be completed by 13 June 1997.

==== Phase 3 Project problems ====
Telstra was responsible for software development and systems integration, areas in which it had no previous experience. GEC-Marconi was responsible for the HF Radar and related software aspects of the project, areas in which it had no previous experience. Other unsuccessful tenderers for the project included experienced Australian software development and systems integration company, BHP IT, and experienced Australian defence contractor AWA Defence Industries. Both of these companies are no longer in business.

By 1996, the project was experiencing technical difficulties and cost overruns. Telstra reported a A$609-million loss and announced that it could not guarantee a delivery date.

The failed Telstra contract prompted the project to enter a fourth phase.

==== Phase 4 ====
Phase 4 involved the completion of the JORN and its subsequent maintenance using a new contractor. In February 1997 Lockheed Martin and Tenix received a contract to deliver and manage the JORN. Subsequently, during June 1997 Lockheed and Tenix formed the company RLM Group to handle the joint venture. An operational radar system was delivered in April 2003, with maintenance contracted to continue until February 2007.

In August 2008, Lockheed Martin acquired Tenix Group's interest in RLM Holdings.

==== Phase 5 ====
As a consequence of the duration of its construction, the JORN delivered in 2003 was designed to a specification developed in the early 1990s. During this period the Alice Springs radar had evolved significantly under the guidance of the Defence Science & Technology Organisation. In February 2004 a fifth phase of the JORN project was approved.

Phase 5 aimed to upgrade the Laverton and Longreach radars to reflect over a decade of OTHR research and development. It was scheduled to run until approximately the year 2011, but was completed around 2013/2014 due to skills shortage. All three stations are now similar, and use updated electronics.

==== Phase 6 ====
In March 2018 it was announced that BAE Systems Australia would undertake the $1.2 billion upgrade to Australia’s Jindalee Operational Radar Network, which was expected to take 10 years to complete.

== Project cost ==
The JORN project (JP2025) has had 5 phases, and has cost approximately $1.8 billion. The ANAO Audit report of June 1996 estimated an overall project cost for Phase 3 of $1.1 billion. Phase 5 costs have been estimated at $70 million. Phase 6 costs expect to be $1.2 billion.

== Technology export ==
On 18 March 2025, Canadian prime minister Mark Carney announced the AU$6.5 billion purchase of JORN radar technology by Canada, for deployment over the Arctic.

On 21 June 2026, Australian deputy prime minister Richard Marles announced that the first stage of the radar procurement project had been signed, with $2.5 billion allocated to this phase. The Canadian government, represented by Secretary of State (Defence Procurement) Stephen Fuhr, has dubbed this the Arctic Over-the-Horizon-Radar (A-OTHR). This is the first of two radar units planned for the Arctic. The second unit — known as the Polar Over-the-Horizon Radar (P-OTHR) — will be situated in the very Far North at a location that has yet to be publicly determined. The exact co-ordinates and community names remain classified.

== Network ==
JORN consists of:

- three active radar stations: one near Longreach, Queensland (Radar 1), a second near Laverton, Western Australia (Radar 2), and a third near Alice Springs, Northern Territory (Radar 3);
- a control centre at RAAF Base Edinburgh in South Australia (JCC);
- seven transponders; and
- twelve vertical ionosondes distributed around Australia and its territories.

DSTO previously used the radar station near Alice Springs, Northern Territory (known as Jindalee Facility Alice Springs) for research and development and also has its own network of vertical/oblique ionosondes for research purposes. The Alice Springs radar was fully integrated into the JORN during Phase 5 to provide a third active radar station.

Each radar station consists of a transmitter site and a receiver site, separated by a large distance to prevent the transmitter from interfering with the receiver. The JORN transmitter and receiver sites are:

- the Queensland transmitter at Longreach, with 90-degree coverage (23.658047°S 144.145432°E),
- the Queensland receiver at Stonehenge, with 90-degree coverage (24.291095°S 143.195286°E),
- the Western Australian transmitter at Leonora, with 180-degree coverage (28.317378°S 122.843456°E), and
- the Western Australian receiver at Laverton, with 180-degree coverage (28.326747°S 122.005234°E).
- the Alice Springs transmitter at Harts Range, with 90-degree coverage (22.967561°S 134.447937°E), and
- the Alice Springs receiver at Mount Everard, with 90-degree coverage (23.521497°S 133.677521°E).

The Alice Springs radar was the original 'Jindalee Stage B' test bed on which the design of the other two stations was based. It continues to act as a research and development testbed in addition to its operational role.

The Mount Everard receiver site contains the remains of the first, smaller, 'Jindalee Stage A' receiver. It is visible in aerial photos, behind the stage B receiver (23.530074°S 133.68782°E). The stage A transmitter was rebuilt to become the stage B transmitter.

The high frequency radio transmitter arrays at Longreach and Laverton have 28 elements, each driven by a 20-kilowatt power amplifier giving a total power of 560 kW. Stage B transmitted 20 kW per amplifier. The signal is bounced off the ionosphere, landing in the "illuminated" area of target interest. Much incident radiation is reflected forward in the original direction of travel, but a small proportion "backscatters" and returns along the original, reciprocal transmission path. These returns again reflect from the ionosphere, finally being received at the Longreach and Laverton stations. Signal attenuation, from transmit antenna to target and finally back to receive antenna, is substantial, and its performance in such a context marks this system as leading-edge science. The receiver stations use KEL Aerospace KFR35 series receivers. JORN uses radio frequencies between 5 and 30 MHz, which is far lower than most other civilian and military radars that operate in the microwave frequency band. Also, unlike most microwave radars, JORN does not use pulsed transmission, nor does it use movable antennas. Transmission is Frequency-Modulated Continuous Wave (FMCW), and the transmitted beam is aimed by the interaction between its "beam-steering" electronics and antenna characteristics in the transmit systems. Radar returns are distinguished in range by the offset between the instantaneous radiated signal frequency and the returning signal frequency. Returns are distinguished in azimuth by measuring phase offsets of individual returns incident across the kilometres-plus length of the multi-element receiving antenna array. Intensive computational work is necessary to JORN's operation, and refinement of the software suite offers the most cost-effective path for improvements.

The JORN ionosonde network is made up of vertical ionosondes, providing a real time map of the ionosphere. Each vertical incidence sounder (VIS) is a standardized Single-Receiver Digisonde Portable Sounder, built by University of Massachusetts Lowell for the JORN. A new ionospheric map is generated every 225 seconds. In a clockwise direction around Australia, the locations of the twelve (11 active and one test) JORN ionosondes are below.

JORN Ionosondes

Location	Identifier	Coordinates	OzGeoRFMap
Laverton, WA	LAV	27.0°S 123.5°E	Jindalee Project WA Transmit Site
Ajana near Geraldton, WA	AJA	27.9°S 114.7°E	Defence Site, Ajana R/T, AJANA
Boolathana Station near Carnarvon, WA	CAR	24.6°S 113.6°E	Defence Installation, CARNARVON
Learmonth RAAF Base near Exmouth, WA	LEA	22.2°S 114.1°E	Ionosonde Site, Learmonth Solar Observatory, Minilya-Exmouth Road, LEARMONTH
South Hedland, WA	SHD	20.4°S 118.6°E	Defence Installation South Hedland, PORT HEDLAND
Curtin RAAF Base, Derby, WA	CUR	17.6°S 123.8°E	Curtin RAAF via, DERBY
Kalkaringi, NT	KAL	17.4°S 130.8°E	Telstra Radio Terminal, KALKARINGI
Groote Eylandt, NT	GRO	13.9°S 136.4°E	Defence Installation, GROOTE EYLANDT
Scherger RAAF Base, Weipa, Qld	SCH	12.7°S 142.1°E	Scherger RAAF Installation, WEIPA
Lynd River, Qld	LYN	18.0°S 144.9°E	Defence, Lynd River Site, LYND RIVER
Longreach, Qld	LON	23.4°S 143.8°E	Queensland Jindalee Tx Site, via, LONGREACH
JORN Coordination Centre, Edinburgh, SA	test unit	34.7°S 138.6°E	Corner of Operations Road & Land Ave DSTO, EDINBURGH

The DSTO ionosonde network is not part of the JORN, but is used to further DSTO's research goals. DSTO uses Four-Receiver Digisonde Portable Sounders (DPS-4), also built by Lowell. During 2004 DSTO had ionosondes at the following locations.

DSTO Ionosondes

Location	Coordinates	OzGeoRFMap
Wyndham, WA	15.4°S 128.1°E	Wyndham, WA
Derby, WA	17.3°S 123.6°E	Defence Site, DERBY
Darwin, NT	12.5°S 130.9°E	11 Mile IPS Site, BERRIMAH
Elliott near Newcastle Waters, NT	17.6°S 133.5°E	Elliott near Newcastle Waters, NT
Alice Springs, NT	24.0°S 133.8°E	Joint Space Defence Research Facility, ALICE SPRINGS

From west to east, the seven JORN transponders are located at

- Christmas Island (OzGeoRFMap),
- Broome, WA (OzGeoRFMap),
- Kalumburu, WA (OzGeoRFMap),
- Darwin, NT (OzGeoRFMap),
- Nhulunbuy, NT (OzGeoRFMap),
- Normanton, Qld (OzGeoRFMap), and
- Horn island, Qld (OzGeoRFMap).

All of the above sites (and many more that likely form part of the network) can be found precisely on the RadioFrequency Map, which also lists the frequencies in use at each site.

== Operation and uses ==
The JORN network is operated by No. 1 Remote Sensor Unit (1RSU). Data from the JORN sites is fed to the JORN Coordination Centre at RAAF Base Edinburgh where it is passed on to other agencies and military units. Officially the system allows the Australian Defence Force to observe air and sea activity north of Australia to distances up to 4,000 kilometres (2,500 mi). This encompasses all of Java, New Guinea and the Solomon Islands, and may include Singapore. However, in 1997, the prototype was able to detect missile launches by China over 5,500 kilometres (3,400 mi) away.

JORN is so sensitive it is able to track planes as small as a Cessna 172 taking off and landing in East Timor 2,600 kilometres (1,600 mi) away. Current research is anticipated to increase its sensitivity by a factor of ten beyond this level.

It is also reportedly able to detect stealth aircraft, as typically these are designed only to avoid detection by microwave radar. Project DUNDEE was a cooperative research project, with American missile defence research, into using JORN to detect missiles. The JORN was anticipated to play a role in future Missile Defense Agency initiatives, detecting and tracking missile launches in Asia.

As JORN is reliant on the interaction of signals with the ionosphere ('bouncing'), disturbances in the ionosphere adversely affect performance. The most significant factor influencing this is solar changes, which include sunrise, sunset and solar disturbances. The effectiveness of JORN is also reduced by extreme weather, including lightning and rough seas.

As JORN uses the Doppler principle to detect objects, it cannot detect objects moving at a tangent to the system, or objects moving at a similar speed to their surroundings.

== Engineering heritage award ==
JORN received an Engineering Heritage International Marker from Engineers Australia as part of its Engineering Heritage Recognition Program.

== See also ==
- Cobra Mist
- Duga radar, a similar Russian system
- Imaging radar
