= List of South Australian government agencies =

Government in South Australia is delivered by a number of agencies, grouped under areas of portfolio responsibility. Each portfolio is led by a government minister who is a member of the Parliament of South Australia, appointed by the Governor as the representative of the Crown.

The agencies are principally grouped around departments, each led by a secretary, director-general or similarly title executive officer and comprising a number of portfolios covering specific policy areas across the department and allocated statutory authorities, trading enterprises, boards, councils and other public bodies.

Agencies have varying levels of operational autonomy, and deliver one or more of frontline public services, administrative functions and law enforcement. Some are structured as for-profit corporations. Where there are multiple portfolios within a department, directors-general may be accountable to a number of ministers.

All agencies are identifiable by their corporate logo, which features in agency advertising, publications and correspondence, pictured right.

A list of articles on South Australian government agencies sorted alphabetically is available at Government agencies of South Australia. The South Australian government maintains a list of agencies and their contact details at its website.

== Attorney-General's Department ==
The South Australian Attorney-General's Department (AGD) brings together a diverse group of functions across justice, rights protection and public safety on behalf of the community. Agencies include:

- Office of the Chief Executive
- Finance, People and Performance
- Fines Enforcement and Recovery Unit
- Legal, Legislative and Rights Protection Services (LLRPS) Division
  - Legal Services
    - The Crown Solicitor's Office
    - The Solicitor-General
    - The Office of the Director of Public Prosecutions
    - The Office of the Parliamentary Counsel
    - Legislative Services
    - Library
  - Rights Protection and Social Justice
    - The Office of the Public Advocate
    - The Office of the Commissioner for Equal Opportunity
    - The Office of the Commissioner for Victims' Rights
    - The Office of the Public Trustee
    - The Office of the Ombudsman
    - The Office of the Police Ombudsman (OPO)
  - South Australian Civil and Administrative Tribunal (SACAT)
  - South Australian Employment Tribunal (SAET)
  - The Industrial Relations Court and Commission
  - The South Australian Health Practitioners Tribunal
  - Forensic Science SA (FSSA)
- Projects and Technology
  - Office of Crime Statistics and Research (OCSAR)
- Safework SA
- Consumer and Business Services
- State Records of South Australia

== Auditor-General's Department ==
The Auditor-General's Department provides the Parliament and public sector entities with independent professional opinions on matters related to financial management, compliance with legislative requirements.

== Department of Human Services ==
The Department of Human Services (DHS) (previously the Department for Communities and Social Inclusion (DCSI)) brings together a range of services, funding and policy responsibilities which together support safety, equality, opportunity and justice across South Australia. The Department includes:

- Community and Organisational Support
- Disability SA
- Disability Services
- Domiciliary Care
- Financial and Business Services
- Housing SA
- HomeStart Finance
- Interpreting and Translating Centre
- Multicultural SA
- NDIS and Service Reform
- Northern Connections
- Office for Problem Gambling
- Office for Volunteers
- Office for Women
- Office for Youth
- Policy and Community Development
- Procurement and Grants
- Screening Unit
- Southern Connections
- State Recovery
- Youth Justice

== Department for Child Protection ==
- Department for Child Protection

== Department for Correctional Services ==
- Department for Correctional Services

== South Australian Country Fire Service ==
- South Australian Country Fire Service

== Courts Administration Authority ==
- Courts Administration Authority

== Defence SA ==
- Defence SA

== Electoral Commission of South Australia ==
- Electoral Commission of South Australia

== Department for Education ==
The Department for Education delivers and coordinates children's services and schooling.

== Department for Health and Wellbeing (SA Health) ==
SA Health is responsible for protecting and improving public health by providing leadership in health reform, policy development and planning:

Local Health Networks (LHNs):

- Central Adelaide LHN
  - Royal Adelaide Hospital
  - Queen Elizabeth Hospital
  - Hampstead Rehabilitation Hospital
  - Woodville GP Plus Health Centre
- Southern Adelaide LHN
  - Noarlunga Hospital
  - Flinders Medical Centre
  - Repatriation General Hospital
  - Aldinga, Noarlunga, Morphett Vale and Marion GP Plus Health Care Centres
- Northern Adelaide LHN
  - Modbury Hospital
  - Lyell McEwin Hospital
  - Modbury and Elizabeth GP Plus Health Care Centres
- Country Health SA LHN
  - country hospitals
  - Ceduna and Port Pirie GP Plus Health Care Centres
  - Patient Assistance Transport Schemen (PATS)
- Women's and Children's LHN
  - Women's and Children's Hospital
- SA Ambulance Service

The following agencies report to a designated LHN:

- SA Dental Service
- Breastscreen SA
- Donate Life
- Prison Health
- SA Pathology
- SA Medical Imaging
- SA Pharmacy
- Biomedical Engineering
- Sterilisation

Department for Health and Ageing divisions:

- Office for the Ageing
  - Adelaide Aged Care Assessment Team
  - Seniors Card
  - retirement villages
- Public Health and Clinical Systems
  - public health
  - communicable disease control
  - emergency management
  - health promotion
- Health Reform
  - delivery of the New Royal Adelaide Hospital and Glenside Campus redevelopment
  - South Australian Health and Medical Research Institute
  - alignment with national reform agenda
- E-Health Systems
  - EPAS (Electronic Patient Enterprise System)
  - information strategy
  - ICT
- Health System Development
  - Aboriginal health
  - media and communications, intergovernment relations
  - service development
- Mental Health and Substance Abuse
  - mental health operations
  - Drug and Alcohol Services SA (DASSA)
- SA Health Workforce
  - human resources and workforce health
  - organisational development and learning
- Health System Performance
  - assets, finance, revenue, procurement
  - records management

== Legal Services Commission ==
- The Legal Services Commission is a statutory authority, independent of government, "funded by both the South Australian and the Commonwealth Governments to provide legal assistance to South Australians".

== South Australian Metropolitan Fire Service ==
- South Australian Metropolitan Fire Service

== Department for Infrastructure and Transport ==
The Department for Infrastructure and Transport (renamed from Department of Planning, Transport and Infrastructure in August 2020) has responsibilities in relation to guiding and administering the South Australian planning and development assessment system, and for transport system and services. The department also works regularly with police in regards to motor vehicle registration, enforcement of speed limits and other road matters.

== Department of the Premier and Cabinet ==
The Department of the Premier and Cabinet (DPC) provides central agency leadership on matters that affect South Australia's prosperity. It provides economic and policy advice to support the government's strategic priorities, the state's international relationships and the management of ICT Strategy, innovation and investment. DPC publishes and advances South Australia's Strategic Plan and has expressed commitments to community engagement, excellence in service delivery and good business practice.

Its responsibilities include, among others:

- Aboriginal affairs and Reconciliation
- Arts and culture, including:
  - Carrick Hill Trust
  - Art Gallery of South Australia
  - South Australian Museum
  - State Library of South Australia
  - History Trust of South Australia
  - South Australian Country Arts Trust
  - State Opera of South Australia
  - Adelaide Festival Corporation
  - Adelaide Festival Centre Trust
  - South Australian Film Corporation
  - State Theatre Company of South Australia
- Art and heritage conservation
- Community engagement
- ICT, digital and cyber security
- Development of Lot Fourteen
- Multicultural affairs
- Emergency management

== Primary Industries and Regions SA (PIRSA) ==
Primary Industries and Regions SA (PIRSA), formerly the Department of Primary Industries and Regions South Australia, is an agency focussed on driving economic growth in the state. Its aim is to "grow primary industries and drive regional development". Its key areas of work include primary sector industries (in SA, mainly agriculture, viticulture and farming of livestock), marine aquaculture, and Biosecurity.

The South Australian Research and Development Institute (SARDI) is the state government's principal research institute, and forms part of PIRSA.

== Department of Treasury and Finance ==
Department of Treasury and Finance, in the portfolio of the Treasurer of South Australia, provides economic, policy and financial advice to the Government, manages the whole of Government financial management processes, including preparation of the state budget, and provides finance-related services across Government.

As of 2020, the Urban Renewal Authority, trading as Renewal SA, is within the Treasurer's portfolio.

The Office for Artificial Intelligence, established in July 2025, is within the Department of Treasury and Finance.

== Department of Trade and Investment ==
The Department for Trade and Investment (DTI) exists in order to foster economic growth in the state, by attracting new foreign investment as well as increasing exports in appropriate sectors. It uses the branding "South Australia" and "I choose SA" to promote investment.

The Planning and Land Use Services (PLUS) division, also known as PlanSA, lies within this department, and the Office for Design and Architecture SA (ODASA) within that. The ODASA team is led by the South Australian Government Architect and has expertise in architecture, heritage, landscape architecture, urban design and urban planning. The Government Architect role in South Australia:

- oversees the state's Design Review program
- provides independent design advice on large-scale development proposals
- supports current planning reforms and the State Planning Commission
- provides independent design advice to Cabinet
- supports infrastructure, planning delivery across government
- supports government procurement

== SAFECOM ==
The South Australian Fire and Emergency Services Commission (SAFECOM) oversees volunteers and employees within the fire and emergency services sector.

SAFECOM works with are:

- the South Australian Country Fire Service (CFS)
- the South Australian Metropolitan Fire Service (MFS)
- the South Australian State Emergency Service (SES)

SAFECOM submits an annual report to the Minister for Emergency Services each year.

== South Australia Police ==
- South Australia Police

== Department for Innovation and Skills ==
- Skills and Employment
- Strategy and Business Services
- Industry and Innovation
- International Engagement, Trade, Immigration and Higher Education
- Mineral Resources
- Energy Resources
- Energy Markets and Programs
- Resources Infrastructure & Investment Task Force
- Training and Skills Commission
- Office of the Training Advocate
- Health Industries SA
- Office for the Commissioner for Aboriginal Engagement
- BioSA Advisory Board
- Office of the Industry Advocate
- Office of the Small Business Commissioner
- Education Adelaide
- Investment Attraction South Australia
- Office of the Economic Development Board
- Australian Cyber Collaboration Centre, opened July 2020

== State Emergency Service ==
- State Emergency Service

== Unclassified ==
- Capital City Committee Directorate
- Adelaide Cemeteries Authority
- Adelaide Film Festival
- Local Government Grants Commission
- Outback Communities Authority
- Office for Recreation, Sport and Racing
- South Australian Sports Institute

== See also ==
- Government of South Australia
