= Naval Communication Station Harold E. Holt =

Joint US-Australian military facility near Exmouth, Western Australia

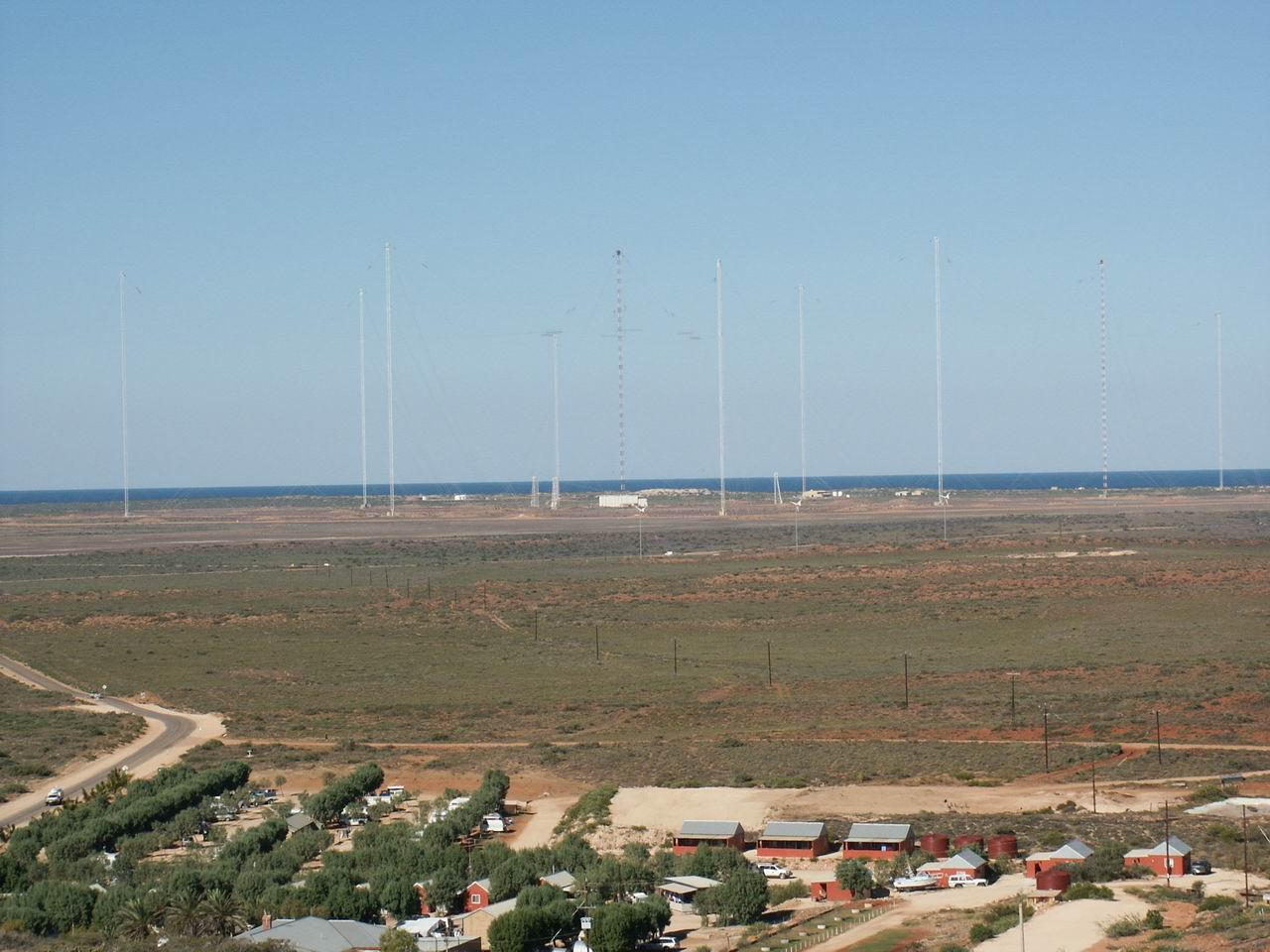
Naval Communication Station Harold E. Holt

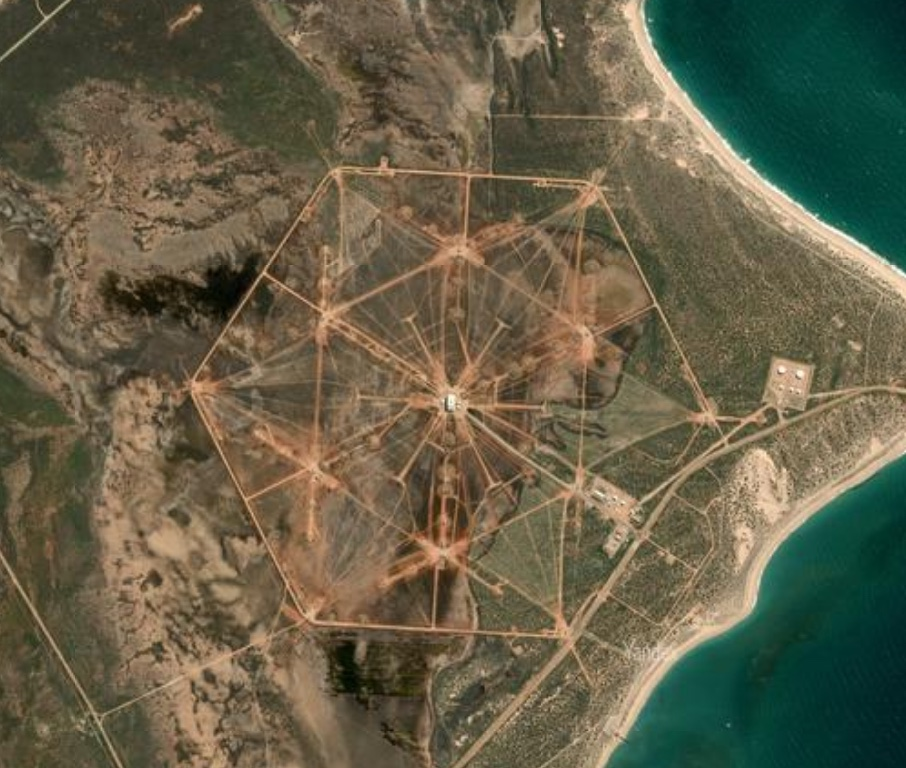
Satellite image

Naval Communication Station Harold E. Holt, commonly known as North West Cape, is a joint Australian and United States naval communication station located on the north-west coast of Australia, 6 kilometres (4 mi) north of the town of Exmouth, Western Australia. The station is operated and maintained by the Australian Department of Defence on behalf of Australia and the United States and provides very low frequency (VLF) radio transmission to United States Navy, Royal Australian Navy and allied ships and submarines in the western Pacific Ocean and eastern Indian Ocean. The frequency is 19.8 kHz. With a transmission power of 1 megawatt, it is claimed to be the most powerful transmission station in the Southern Hemisphere.

The town of Exmouth was built at the same time as the communications station to provide support to the base and to house dependent families of United States Navy personnel.

== VLF transmitter masts ==
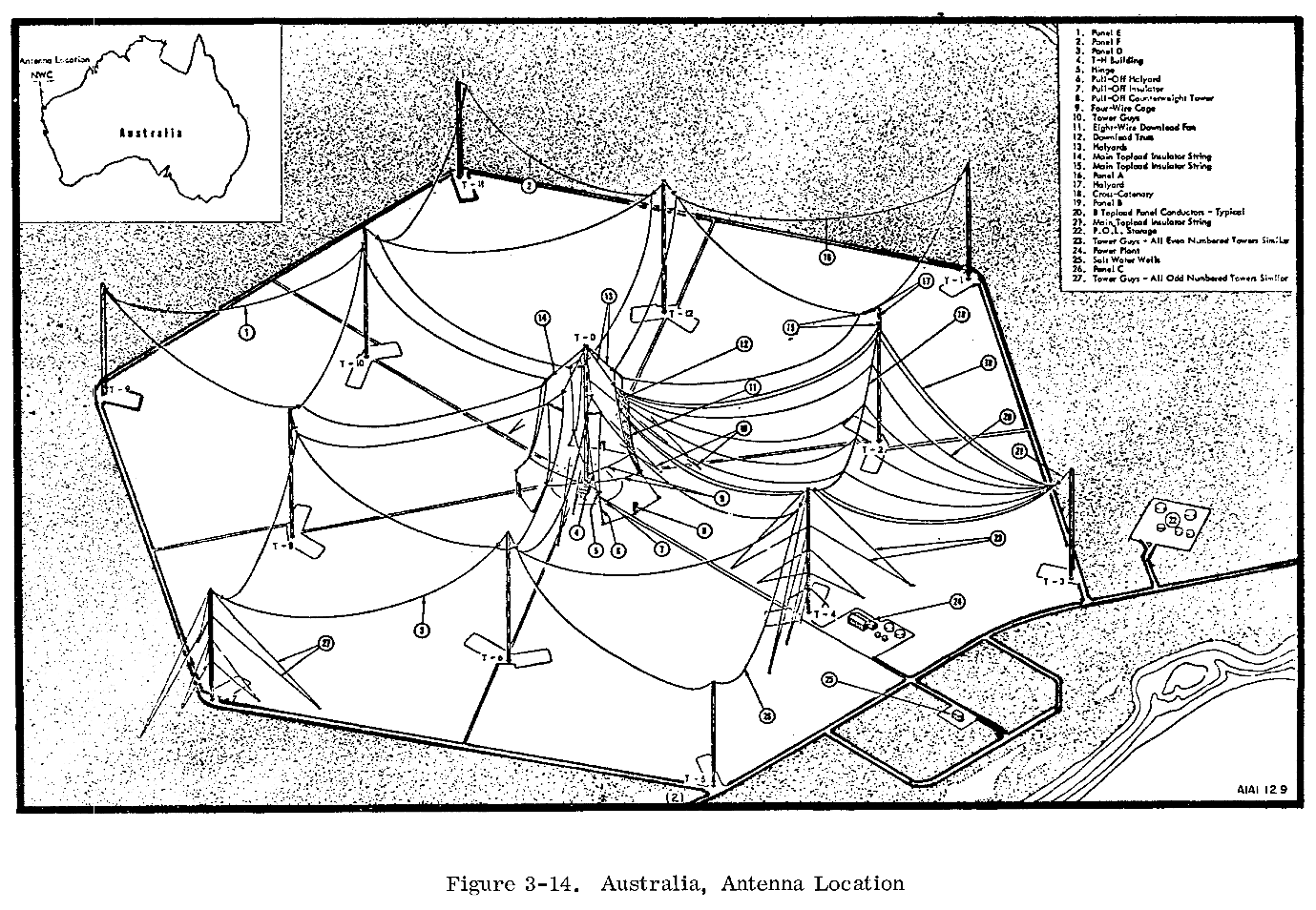
Diagram of towers

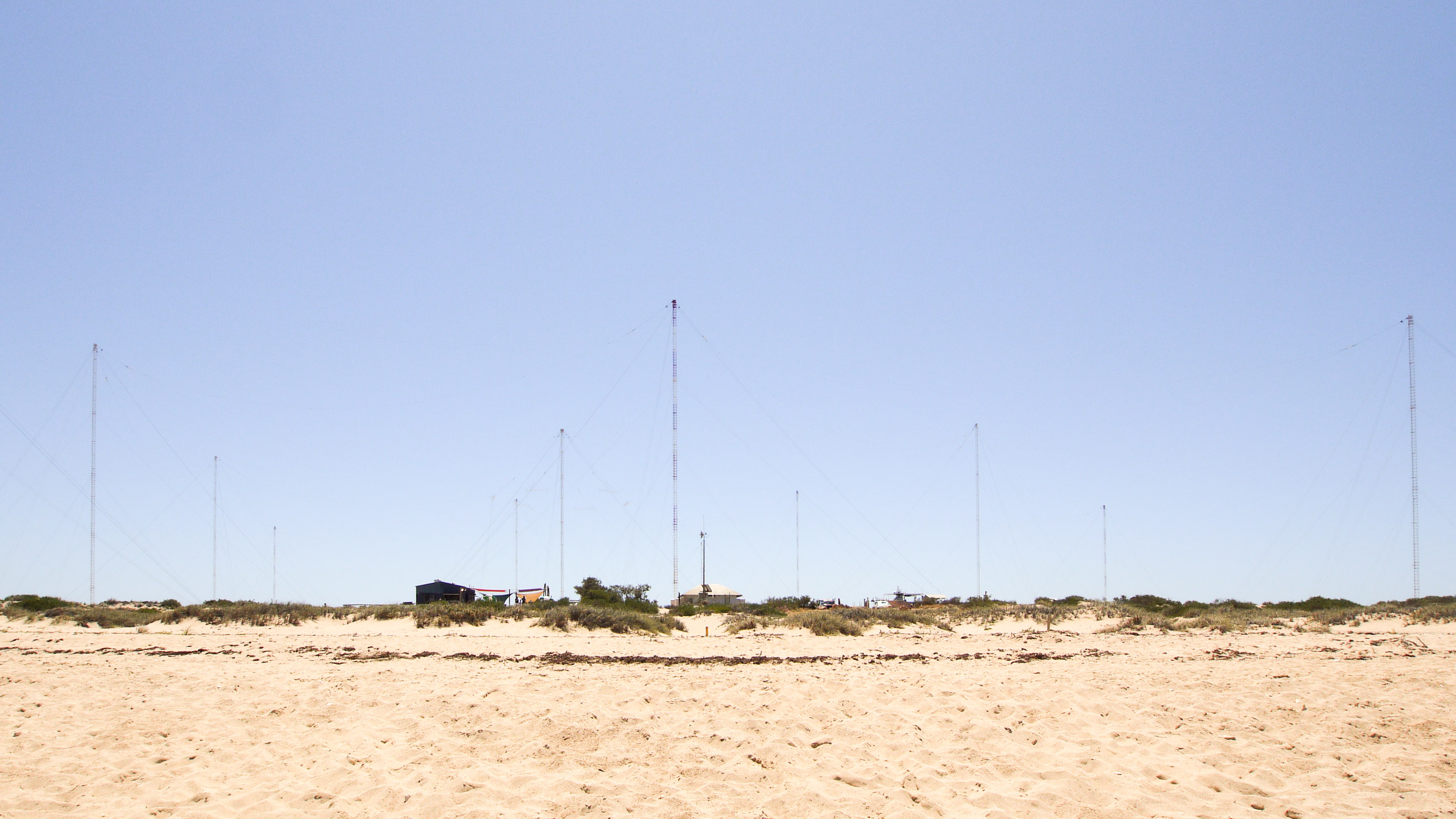
VLF transmitter masts as seen from nearby Bundegi Beach

The station features thirteen tall radio towers. The tallest tower is called Tower Zero and is 387.4 metres (1,271 ft) tall, and was for many years the tallest human-made structure in the Southern Hemisphere. Six odd-numbered outer towers T1–T11, located on an outer ring, each 358 metres (1,175 ft) tall, are placed in a hexagon around Tower Zero. The other six even-numbered inner towers T2–T12, which are each 303.6 metres (996 ft) tall, are placed in a smaller hexagon around Tower Zero.

Structure	Height		Location
Structure	(m)	(ft)	Location
Tower 0	387.4	1,271	21°48′58″S 114°9′55″E
Tower 1	358	1,175	21°48′35″S 114°9′57″E
Tower 2	303.5	996	21°48′48″S 114°10′18″E
Tower 3	358	1,175	21°49′12″S 114°10′16″E
Tower 4	303.5	996	21°49′23″S 114°9′54″E
Tower 5	358	1,175	21°49′10″S 114°9′32″E
Tower 6	303.5	996	21°48′45″S 114°9′33″E
Tower 7	358	1,175	21°48′25″S 114°10′19″E
Tower 8	303.5	996	21°49′1″S 114°10′38″E
Tower 9	358	1,175	21°49′35″S 114°10′14″E
Tower 10	303.5	996	21°49′33″S 114°9′31″E
Tower 11	358	1,175	21°48′56″S 114°9′11″E
Tower 12	303.5	996	21°48′22″S 114°9′35″E

On 3 March 2009, the Defence Materiel Organisation advertised on the AusTender website a tender to construct two new roads at the station. The tender stated the 357 guy wires which support the 13 towers had exceeded their life expectancy and the roads will support the installation of the VLF guy wires. It states:

Naval Communication Station Harold E Holt (NCSHEH) is sited on the northernmost tip of the peninsula known as North West Cape. The Very Low Frequency (VLF) antennas are large spider webs of wire supported in a top hat arrangement. The centre tower 'Tower Zero', rises to a height of 387.4 metres. The other towers are spread out in two concentric rings around Tower Zero; the towers of the inner ring are 303.5 metres high while those of the outer ring are 358. Buried in the ground beneath the antenna array is 386 kilometres of bare copper ground mat.

— Defence Materiel Organisation, PDBF-0002-2009

== History ==
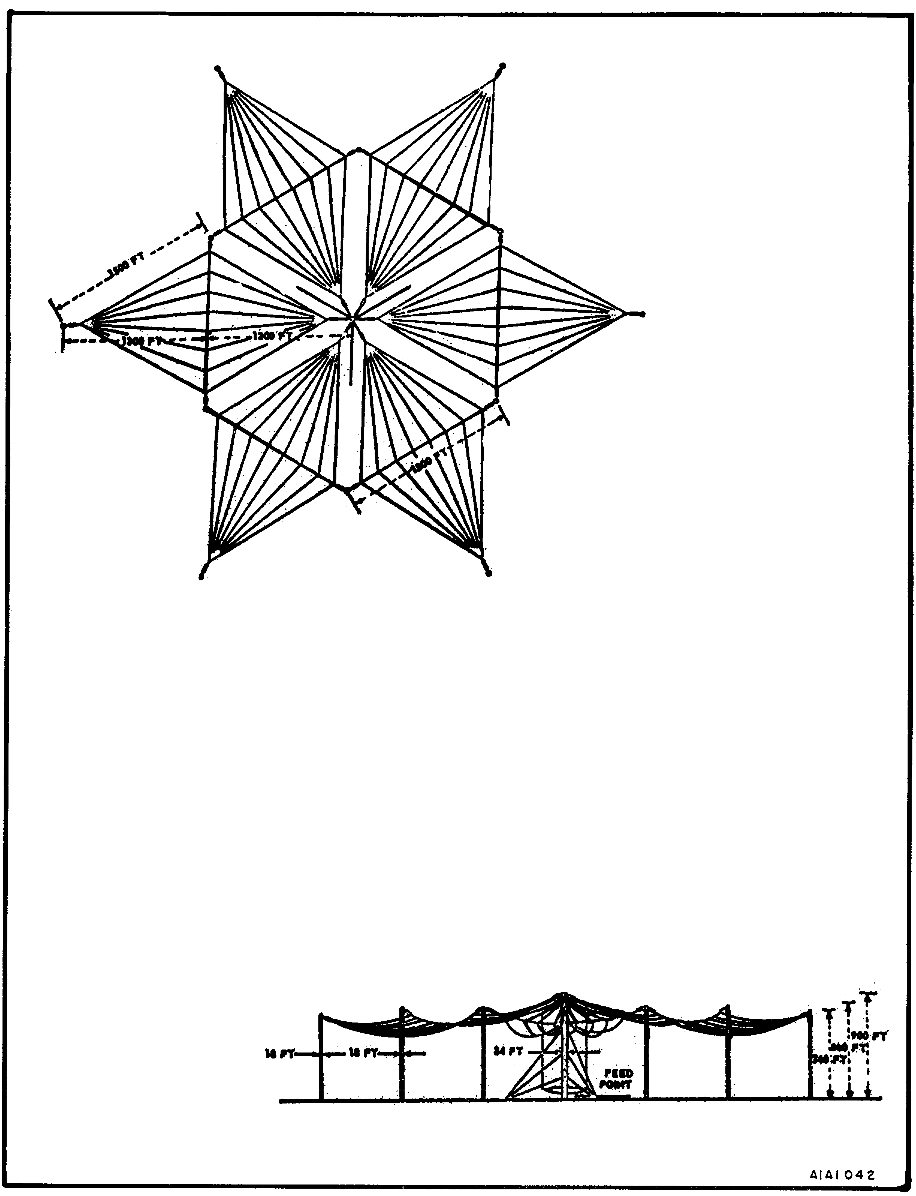
Diagram of a Trideco type antenna like that installed at Harold E. Holt

Garfield Barwick, Australian Minister for External Affairs, negotiated the lease on the US base at North West Cape in 1963 with US ambassador William Battle. The station was commissioned as US Naval Communication Station North West Cape on 16 September 1967 at a ceremony with the US Ambassador to Australia Edward A. Clark and the Prime Minister of Australia Harold Holt, at which peppercorn rent for the base for the first year was paid.

On 20 September 1968, the station was officially renamed to US Naval Communication Station Harold E. Holt in memory of the late Prime Minister of Australia, who disappeared whilst swimming and was declared dead, presumed drowned, three months after the station was commissioned.

With the election of the Labor Government to power in 1972, Defence Minister Lance Barnard started negotiations on the condition of operation of the US military bases in Australia. On 9 January 1974 a joint statement by Lance Barnard and James Schlesinger, the US Secretary of Defense, assigned the Deputy Commander of the base to a Royal Australian Navy officer and gave Australian personnel roles in base technical and maintenance functions. The cipher room was closed to Australian scrutiny. The joint statement stressed the importance of consultations in crises. There was no undertaking given by the US to relay fire orders to their submarines bearing nuclear missiles.

In May 1974 several hundred people travelled to North West Cape from around Australia to protest and occupy the base and "symbolically reclaiming it for the Australian people". During the occupation the Eureka Flag was flown over the base with 55 people arrested during the protest. Songs composed in the campaign against North West Cape and other US bases in Australia include We don't want no Yankee Bases and Omega Doodle which have become part of the Australian folkloric tradition. From 1967 until October 1992 a USN Naval Security Group Detachment was stationed at the facility.

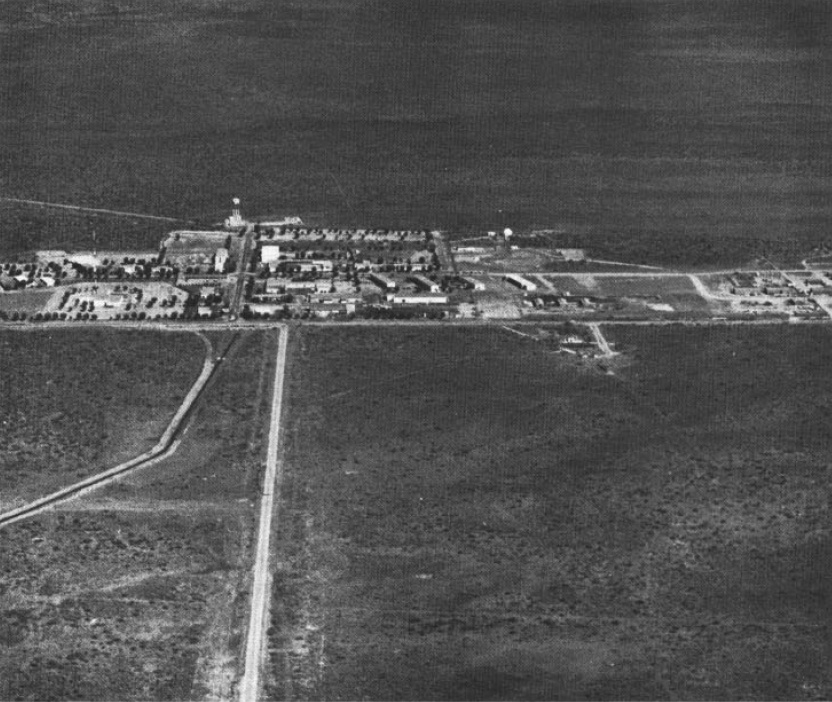
Station buildings in 1979

In Western Australian domestic politics, the presence of foreign military installations in the state has occasionally been questioned over the decades. The "US" was dropped from the station's official title with the advent of joint United States and Royal Australian Navy operation in 1974. In 1991, an agreement was reached between the governments of Australia and the United States that would make the facility an Australian Naval Communication Station by 1999, a transition that began with a Royal Australian Navy officer taking command of the facility in 1992. The majority of US Naval presence ended in 1993 with the withdrawal of all US Naval personnel.

In July 2002, the Royal Australian Navy handed over operation of the station to the Defence Materiel Organisation. The base is currently operated under contract by Raytheon Australia. On 15 July 2008, Australia and the US signed a bilateral treaty governing the future joint use of the facility for the next 25 years.

Harold E. Holt was identified as a potential Air Force Space Surveillance System (or Space Fence) site in 2011. On 6 December 2013 it was announced that the Space Surveillance Telescope (SST), part of the United States Space Surveillance Network, would be relocated to the Harold E. Holt Naval Communication Station from its initial deployment at the White Sands Missile Range in New Mexico. The SST entered initial operational capability at North West Cape on 4 October 2022 and was originally operated by the Royal Australian Air Force, 1 Remote Sensor Unit. A C-Band Space Surveillance Radar was installed in 2022. No. 1 Space Surveillance Unit became responsible for operating the radar and telescope in early 2023. It is located at RAAF Base Edinburgh in South Australia, and operates the systems remotely.

== Aircraft interference controversy ==
On 7 October 2008, Qantas Flight 72 made an emergency landing at Learmonth airport near the town of Exmouth, Western Australia following an inflight accident featuring a pair of sudden uncommanded pitch-down manoeuvres that resulted in serious injuries to many of the occupants. The Australian Transport Safety Bureau (ATSB) identified in a preliminary report that a fault occurred within the Number 1 Air Data Inertial Reference Unit (ADIRU) and is the "likely origin of the event". The ADIRU – one of three such devices on the aircraft – began to supply incorrect data to the other aircraft systems. The ATSB assessment of speculation that possible interference from Naval Communication Station Harold E. Holt or passenger personal electronic devices could have been involved was "extremely unlikely".

On 27 December 2008, another aircraft, Qantas Flight 71, also had a malfunction in its ADIRU. The incident again fuelled media speculation regarding the significance of the Harold E. Holt facility, with the Australian and International Pilots Association calling for commercial aircraft to be barred from the area as a precaution until the events are better understood, while the manager of the facility claimed that it was "highly, highly unlikely" that any interference had been caused.

== See also ==
- Joint Geological and Geophysical Research Station
- VLF Transmitter Woodside
- VLF Transmitter Cutler
- Jim Creek Naval Radio Station
- Lualualei VLF transmitter
- List of masts
