= List of minor planets: 675001–676000 =

The following is a partial list of minor planets, running from minor-planet number 675001 through 676000, inclusive. The primary data for this and other partial lists is based on JPL's "Small-Body Orbital Elements" and data available from the Minor Planet Center. Critical list information is also provided by the MPC, unless otherwise specified from Lowell Observatory. A detailed description of the table's columns and additional sources are given on the main page including a complete list of every page in this series, and a statistical break-up on the dynamical classification of minor planets.

Also see the summary list of all named bodies in numerical and alphabetical order, and the corresponding naming citations for the number range of this particular list. New namings may only be added to this list after official publication, as the preannouncement of names is condemned by the Working Group for Small Bodies Nomenclature of the International Astronomical Union.

Near-Earth obj.	MBA (inner)	MBA (outer)	Centaur
Mars-crosser	MBA (middle)	Jupiter trojan	Trans-Neptunian obj.
Unclassified

== 675001–675100 ==
Designation			Discovery			Properties		Ref
Permanent	Provisional	Named after	Date	Site	Discoverer(s)	Category	Diam.	Ref
675001	2015 TG_{211}	—	April 24, 2008	Kitt Peak	Spacewatch	EOS	1.5 km	MPC · JPL
675002	2015 TL_{212}	—	November 14, 2010	Kitt Peak	Spacewatch	·	2.2 km	MPC · JPL
675003	2015 TO_{218}	—	March 11, 2008	Kitt Peak	Spacewatch	·	1.7 km	MPC · JPL
675004	2015 TW_{224}	—	February 14, 2007	Mauna Kea	P. A. Wiegert	THM	2.1 km	MPC · JPL
675005	2015 TJ_{226}	—	October 10, 2015	Haleakala	Pan-STARRS 1	T_{j} (2.98)	2.5 km	MPC · JPL
675006	2015 TE_{228}	—	June 29, 2014	Mount Lemmon	Mount Lemmon Survey	·	2.9 km	MPC · JPL
675007	2015 TG_{230}	—	September 28, 2006	Catalina	CSS	EUN	1.3 km	MPC · JPL
675008	2015 TB_{232}	—	October 10, 2015	Haleakala	Pan-STARRS 1	PHO	830 m	MPC · JPL
675009	2015 TA_{233}	—	August 29, 2006	Catalina	CSS	·	1.4 km	MPC · JPL
675010	2015 TU_{234}	—	October 11, 2015	Mount Lemmon	Mount Lemmon Survey	·	710 m	MPC · JPL
675011	2015 TR_{236}	—	April 18, 2013	Elena Remote	Oreshko, A.	·	3.7 km	MPC · JPL
675012	2015 TG_{237}	—	August 21, 2015	Haleakala	Pan-STARRS 1	H	470 m	MPC · JPL
675013	2015 TE_{238}	—	March 25, 2006	Catalina	CSS	·	360 m	MPC · JPL
675014	2015 TV_{238}	—	April 14, 2007	Kitt Peak	Spacewatch	H	400 m	MPC · JPL
675015	2015 TC_{241}	—	September 16, 2006	Catalina	CSS	·	2.0 km	MPC · JPL
675016	2015 TX_{241}	—	August 15, 2009	Catalina	CSS	·	2.9 km	MPC · JPL
675017	2015 TM_{244}	—	March 9, 2007	Mount Lemmon	Mount Lemmon Survey	·	3.1 km	MPC · JPL
675018	2015 TB_{245}	—	September 7, 2008	Mount Lemmon	Mount Lemmon Survey	·	650 m	MPC · JPL
675019	2015 TF_{245}	—	March 13, 2013	Mount Lemmon	Mount Lemmon Survey	·	2.3 km	MPC · JPL
675020	2015 TO_{247}	—	October 31, 2005	Mauna Kea	A. Boattini	THM	2.3 km	MPC · JPL
675021	2015 TW_{248}	—	October 10, 2015	Haleakala	Pan-STARRS 1	·	570 m	MPC · JPL
675022	2015 TK_{249}	—	September 6, 2015	Haleakala	Pan-STARRS 1	·	2.4 km	MPC · JPL
675023	2015 TR_{249}	—	October 8, 2015	Haleakala	Pan-STARRS 1	ERI	1.2 km	MPC · JPL
675024	2015 TX_{249}	—	November 5, 2005	Kitt Peak	Spacewatch	·	1.8 km	MPC · JPL
675025	2015 TF_{253}	—	June 6, 2014	Haleakala	Pan-STARRS 1	·	2.5 km	MPC · JPL
675026	2015 TU_{253}	—	August 16, 2009	Kitt Peak	Spacewatch	·	2.7 km	MPC · JPL
675027	2015 TV_{255}	—	October 11, 2006	Palomar	NEAT	·	2.3 km	MPC · JPL
675028	2015 TK_{256}	—	August 17, 2009	Kitt Peak	Spacewatch	·	2.6 km	MPC · JPL
675029	2015 TY_{256}	—	April 29, 2008	Mount Lemmon	Mount Lemmon Survey	·	2.2 km	MPC · JPL
675030	2015 TJ_{257}	—	August 12, 2015	Haleakala	Pan-STARRS 1	·	3.0 km	MPC · JPL
675031	2015 TG_{259}	—	September 26, 2005	Palomar	NEAT	·	610 m	MPC · JPL
675032	2015 TW_{261}	—	November 4, 2010	Mount Lemmon	Mount Lemmon Survey	·	2.2 km	MPC · JPL
675033	2015 TH_{262}	—	December 3, 2012	Mount Lemmon	Mount Lemmon Survey	V	560 m	MPC · JPL
675034	2015 TR_{262}	—	October 12, 2015	Haleakala	Pan-STARRS 1	EOS	1.5 km	MPC · JPL
675035	2015 TL_{263}	—	July 2, 2014	Haleakala	Pan-STARRS 1	EOS	2.2 km	MPC · JPL
675036	2015 TF_{264}	—	May 11, 2005	Kitt Peak	Spacewatch	·	1.7 km	MPC · JPL
675037	2015 TQ_{264}	—	October 17, 2010	Mount Lemmon	Mount Lemmon Survey	·	3.0 km	MPC · JPL
675038	2015 TA_{266}	—	September 6, 2015	Haleakala	Pan-STARRS 1	·	620 m	MPC · JPL
675039	2015 TL_{266}	—	September 17, 2010	Mount Lemmon	Mount Lemmon Survey	·	2.1 km	MPC · JPL
675040	2015 TO_{267}	—	January 27, 2007	Kitt Peak	Spacewatch	EOS	1.6 km	MPC · JPL
675041	2015 TA_{268}	—	February 3, 2009	Mount Lemmon	Mount Lemmon Survey	·	1.6 km	MPC · JPL
675042	2015 TN_{268}	—	October 12, 2015	Haleakala	Pan-STARRS 1	·	2.1 km	MPC · JPL
675043	2015 TO_{268}	—	December 16, 2007	Kitt Peak	Spacewatch	·	1.9 km	MPC · JPL
675044	2015 TT_{271}	—	October 11, 2010	Mount Lemmon	Mount Lemmon Survey	·	2.3 km	MPC · JPL
675045	2015 TJ_{274}	—	April 2, 2013	Kitt Peak	Spacewatch	·	2.0 km	MPC · JPL
675046	2015 TZ_{274}	—	October 2, 2015	Mount Lemmon	Mount Lemmon Survey	·	2.5 km	MPC · JPL
675047	2015 TA_{277}	—	June 27, 2014	Haleakala	Pan-STARRS 1	·	2.4 km	MPC · JPL
675048	2015 TE_{277}	—	November 10, 2010	Mount Lemmon	Mount Lemmon Survey	EOS	1.6 km	MPC · JPL
675049	2015 TU_{277}	—	July 25, 2015	Haleakala	Pan-STARRS 1	·	2.2 km	MPC · JPL
675050	2015 TC_{280}	—	September 12, 2015	Haleakala	Pan-STARRS 1	·	550 m	MPC · JPL
675051	2015 TH_{284}	—	October 13, 2010	Mount Lemmon	Mount Lemmon Survey	EOS	1.7 km	MPC · JPL
675052	2015 TJ_{286}	—	October 12, 2015	Space Surveillance	Space Surveillance Telescope	·	3.9 km	MPC · JPL
675053	2015 TW_{287}	—	November 20, 2006	Kitt Peak	Spacewatch	·	2.7 km	MPC · JPL
675054	2015 TW_{289}	—	October 12, 2015	Space Surveillance	Space Surveillance Telescope	TIR	2.0 km	MPC · JPL
675055	2015 TZ_{289}	—	February 27, 2012	Haleakala	Pan-STARRS 1	·	2.9 km	MPC · JPL
675056	2015 TT_{290}	—	January 12, 2011	Mount Lemmon	Mount Lemmon Survey	·	2.5 km	MPC · JPL
675057	2015 TU_{290}	—	July 25, 2015	Haleakala	Pan-STARRS 1	·	1.2 km	MPC · JPL
675058	2015 TQ_{291}	—	September 12, 2015	Haleakala	Pan-STARRS 1	·	650 m	MPC · JPL
675059	2015 TV_{291}	—	January 21, 2012	Catalina	CSS	·	890 m	MPC · JPL
675060	2015 TY_{291}	—	September 24, 2015	Catalina	CSS	·	3.3 km	MPC · JPL
675061	2015 TB_{292}	—	May 28, 2014	Mount Lemmon	Mount Lemmon Survey	·	1.8 km	MPC · JPL
675062	2015 TV_{295}	—	September 12, 2015	Haleakala	Pan-STARRS 1	·	1.3 km	MPC · JPL
675063	2015 TO_{296}	—	February 14, 2013	Kitt Peak	Spacewatch	·	2.3 km	MPC · JPL
675064	2015 TQ_{298}	—	March 8, 2013	Haleakala	Pan-STARRS 1	·	1.0 km	MPC · JPL
675065	2015 TW_{298}	—	September 28, 2006	Catalina	CSS	·	2.2 km	MPC · JPL
675066	2015 TP_{299}	—	October 12, 2010	Mount Lemmon	Mount Lemmon Survey	·	1.6 km	MPC · JPL
675067	2015 TC_{302}	—	October 23, 2011	Haleakala	Pan-STARRS 1	·	760 m	MPC · JPL
675068	2015 TJ_{302}	—	September 23, 2015	Haleakala	Pan-STARRS 1	·	990 m	MPC · JPL
675069	2015 TO_{302}	—	December 2, 2005	Kitt Peak	Wasserman, L. H., Millis, R. L.	V	500 m	MPC · JPL
675070	2015 TT_{302}	—	December 31, 2011	Kitt Peak	Spacewatch	·	2.0 km	MPC · JPL
675071	2015 TV_{302}	—	December 14, 2010	Mount Lemmon	Mount Lemmon Survey	·	2.8 km	MPC · JPL
675072	2015 TW_{302}	—	August 21, 2015	Haleakala	Pan-STARRS 1	V	640 m	MPC · JPL
675073	2015 TZ_{302}	—	October 14, 2010	Mount Lemmon	Mount Lemmon Survey	·	2.4 km	MPC · JPL
675074	2015 TB_{306}	—	March 7, 2013	Mount Lemmon	Mount Lemmon Survey	·	890 m	MPC · JPL
675075	2015 TL_{307}	—	January 19, 2012	Haleakala	Pan-STARRS 1	·	3.8 km	MPC · JPL
675076	2015 TB_{308}	—	January 27, 2012	Mount Lemmon	Mount Lemmon Survey	·	2.9 km	MPC · JPL
675077	2015 TB_{310}	—	January 19, 2012	Kitt Peak	Spacewatch	·	2.7 km	MPC · JPL
675078	2015 TW_{311}	—	October 24, 2005	Mauna Kea	A. Boattini	·	3.7 km	MPC · JPL
675079	2015 TB_{313}	—	October 13, 2015	Mount Lemmon	Mount Lemmon Survey	·	600 m	MPC · JPL
675080	2015 TU_{313}	—	August 22, 2004	Kitt Peak	Spacewatch	·	2.1 km	MPC · JPL
675081	2015 TH_{315}	—	June 24, 2015	Haleakala	Pan-STARRS 1	H	500 m	MPC · JPL
675082	2015 TD_{317}	—	January 2, 2012	Mount Lemmon	Mount Lemmon Survey	·	2.5 km	MPC · JPL
675083	2015 TQ_{318}	—	June 26, 2015	Haleakala	Pan-STARRS 1	·	1.0 km	MPC · JPL
675084	2015 TR_{321}	—	December 24, 2011	Mount Lemmon	Mount Lemmon Survey	·	1.4 km	MPC · JPL
675085	2015 TN_{322}	—	September 23, 2011	Haleakala	Pan-STARRS 1	·	630 m	MPC · JPL
675086	2015 TB_{325}	—	September 23, 2015	Haleakala	Pan-STARRS 1	·	1.7 km	MPC · JPL
675087	2015 TE_{327}	—	May 9, 2014	Haleakala	Pan-STARRS 1	·	1.8 km	MPC · JPL
675088	2015 TN_{327}	—	October 13, 2015	Haleakala	Pan-STARRS 1	·	2.7 km	MPC · JPL
675089	2015 TE_{330}	—	October 13, 2015	Haleakala	Pan-STARRS 1	·	2.4 km	MPC · JPL
675090	2015 TF_{330}	—	January 28, 2007	Mount Lemmon	Mount Lemmon Survey	·	2.4 km	MPC · JPL
675091	2015 TN_{331}	—	October 13, 2015	Haleakala	Pan-STARRS 1	·	3.0 km	MPC · JPL
675092	2015 TU_{334}	—	June 21, 2014	Mount Lemmon	Mount Lemmon Survey	EOS	1.8 km	MPC · JPL
675093	2015 TJ_{336}	—	October 23, 2004	Kitt Peak	Spacewatch	·	3.1 km	MPC · JPL
675094	2015 TA_{338}	—	May 2, 2014	Mount Lemmon	Mount Lemmon Survey	·	2.3 km	MPC · JPL
675095	2015 TA_{339}	—	December 11, 1998	Kitt Peak	Spacewatch	(2076)	740 m	MPC · JPL
675096	2015 TQ_{340}	—	August 13, 2015	Haleakala	Pan-STARRS 1	·	3.9 km	MPC · JPL
675097	2015 TY_{340}	—	December 30, 2007	Kitt Peak	Spacewatch	·	1.3 km	MPC · JPL
675098	2015 TJ_{341}	—	May 6, 2014	Haleakala	Pan-STARRS 1	·	2.7 km	MPC · JPL
675099	2015 TQ_{346}	—	February 2, 2009	Mount Lemmon	Mount Lemmon Survey	·	980 m	MPC · JPL
675100	2015 TY_{346}	—	December 30, 2008	Mount Lemmon	Mount Lemmon Survey	·	920 m	MPC · JPL

== 675101–675200 ==
back to top

Designation			Discovery			Properties		Ref
Permanent	Provisional	Named after	Date	Site	Discoverer(s)	Category	Diam.	Ref
675101	2015 TL_{347}	—	October 29, 2010	Mount Lemmon	Mount Lemmon Survey	·	2.5 km	MPC · JPL
675102	2015 TE_{348}	—	September 23, 2015	Haleakala	Pan-STARRS 1	T_{j} (2.96)	2.6 km	MPC · JPL
675103	2015 TS_{348}	—	November 8, 2010	SM Montmagastrell	Bosch, J. M.	·	2.9 km	MPC · JPL
675104	2015 TW_{350}	—	October 12, 2010	Vail-Jarnac	Glinos, T.	·	1.7 km	MPC · JPL
675105	2015 TM_{352}	—	October 8, 2015	Haleakala	Pan-STARRS 1	H	370 m	MPC · JPL
675106	2015 TV_{352}	—	December 13, 2010	Socorro	LINEAR	H	420 m	MPC · JPL
675107	2015 TN_{353}	—	November 3, 2010	Kitt Peak	Spacewatch	H	390 m	MPC · JPL
675108	2015 TF_{358}	—	November 22, 2015	Mount Lemmon	Mount Lemmon Survey	·	1.8 km	MPC · JPL
675109	2015 TM_{358}	—	November 11, 2010	Mount Lemmon	Mount Lemmon Survey	EMA	2.2 km	MPC · JPL
675110	2015 TN_{359}	—	February 8, 2013	Haleakala	Pan-STARRS 1	·	740 m	MPC · JPL
675111	2015 TZ_{364}	—	April 19, 2013	Haleakala	Pan-STARRS 1	·	2.5 km	MPC · JPL
675112	2015 TH_{365}	—	October 23, 2001	Socorro	LINEAR	GEF	1.3 km	MPC · JPL
675113	2015 TM_{366}	—	August 27, 2009	Catalina	CSS	·	2.5 km	MPC · JPL
675114	2015 TB_{367}	—	September 24, 2008	Mount Lemmon	Mount Lemmon Survey	·	650 m	MPC · JPL
675115	2015 TS_{367}	—	September 4, 2011	Haleakala	Pan-STARRS 1	·	980 m	MPC · JPL
675116	2015 TQ_{368}	—	September 23, 2008	Kitt Peak	Spacewatch	V	410 m	MPC · JPL
675117	2015 TJ_{369}	—	October 8, 2015	Haleakala	Pan-STARRS 1	EOS	1.6 km	MPC · JPL
675118	2015 TL_{369}	—	April 12, 2013	Haleakala	Pan-STARRS 1	·	2.7 km	MPC · JPL
675119	2015 TV_{369}	—	April 11, 2013	Mount Lemmon	Mount Lemmon Survey	·	3.0 km	MPC · JPL
675120	2015 TJ_{370}	—	November 1, 2010	Mount Lemmon	Mount Lemmon Survey	·	2.1 km	MPC · JPL
675121	2015 TU_{370}	—	October 15, 2004	Kitt Peak	Spacewatch	T_{j} (2.99) · EUP	3.0 km	MPC · JPL
675122	2015 TK_{371}	—	July 31, 2005	Palomar	NEAT	·	2.4 km	MPC · JPL
675123	2015 TV_{371}	—	December 10, 2010	Mount Lemmon	Mount Lemmon Survey	·	2.0 km	MPC · JPL
675124	2015 TL_{372}	—	November 6, 2010	Mount Lemmon	Mount Lemmon Survey	·	1.6 km	MPC · JPL
675125	2015 TM_{372}	—	May 8, 2014	Haleakala	Pan-STARRS 1	·	720 m	MPC · JPL
675126	2015 TK_{376}	—	September 1, 2014	Mount Lemmon	Mount Lemmon Survey	·	2.6 km	MPC · JPL
675127	2015 TV_{376}	—	January 19, 2012	Haleakala	Pan-STARRS 1	·	1.4 km	MPC · JPL
675128	2015 TY_{381}	—	September 26, 2003	Apache Point	SDSS Collaboration	·	2.6 km	MPC · JPL
675129	2015 TL_{382}	—	September 2, 2011	Haleakala	Pan-STARRS 1	·	970 m	MPC · JPL
675130	2015 TZ_{384}	—	May 8, 2014	Haleakala	Pan-STARRS 1	·	620 m	MPC · JPL
675131	2015 TF_{385}	—	September 25, 2009	Kitt Peak	Spacewatch	·	2.0 km	MPC · JPL
675132	2015 TF_{386}	—	May 15, 2005	Palomar	NEAT	·	1.9 km	MPC · JPL
675133	2015 TT_{386}	—	October 8, 2015	Haleakala	Pan-STARRS 1	·	2.4 km	MPC · JPL
675134	2015 TU_{387}	—	October 2, 2015	Mount Lemmon	Mount Lemmon Survey	·	2.9 km	MPC · JPL
675135	2015 TD_{388}	—	October 3, 2015	Haleakala	Pan-STARRS 1	·	2.6 km	MPC · JPL
675136	2015 TO_{399}	—	October 8, 2015	Haleakala	Pan-STARRS 1	·	650 m	MPC · JPL
675137	2015 TU_{408}	—	October 9, 2015	Haleakala	Pan-STARRS 1	EOS	1.2 km	MPC · JPL
675138	2015 TX_{413}	—	October 15, 2015	Mount Lemmon	Mount Lemmon Survey	·	800 m	MPC · JPL
675139	2015 TW_{416}	—	October 11, 2015	Mount Lemmon	Mount Lemmon Survey	·	2.3 km	MPC · JPL
675140	2015 TT_{417}	—	October 1, 2015	Mount Lemmon	Mount Lemmon Survey	·	2.8 km	MPC · JPL
675141	2015 TV_{422}	—	October 9, 2015	Haleakala	Pan-STARRS 1	·	2.5 km	MPC · JPL
675142	2015 TW_{427}	—	March 21, 2001	Kitt Peak	SKADS	·	2.1 km	MPC · JPL
675143	2015 TQ_{429}	—	October 11, 2015	Mount Lemmon	Mount Lemmon Survey	·	1.7 km	MPC · JPL
675144	2015 TC_{442}	—	October 3, 2015	Haleakala	Pan-STARRS 1	PHO	740 m	MPC · JPL
675145	2015 TY_{444}	—	July 10, 1997	Kitt Peak	Spacewatch	·	700 m	MPC · JPL
675146	2015 TO_{448}	—	October 1, 2015	Mount Lemmon	Mount Lemmon Survey	·	430 m	MPC · JPL
675147	2015 TM_{450}	—	October 10, 2015	Haleakala	Pan-STARRS 1	·	1.0 km	MPC · JPL
675148	2015 TQ_{459}	—	October 13, 2015	Haleakala	Pan-STARRS 1	·	940 m	MPC · JPL
675149	2015 UN	—	February 11, 2008	Mount Lemmon	Mount Lemmon Survey	·	1.9 km	MPC · JPL
675150	2015 UG_{4}	—	October 5, 2011	Piszkéstető	K. Sárneczky	EUN	840 m	MPC · JPL
675151	2015 UO_{4}	—	March 8, 2013	Haleakala	Pan-STARRS 1	·	810 m	MPC · JPL
675152	2015 UP_{6}	—	August 12, 2015	Haleakala	Pan-STARRS 1	·	950 m	MPC · JPL
675153	2015 UQ_{6}	—	October 22, 2006	Palomar	NEAT	·	2.1 km	MPC · JPL
675154	2015 UV_{6}	—	November 12, 2010	Kitt Peak	Spacewatch	·	2.6 km	MPC · JPL
675155	2015 UB_{7}	—	February 14, 2013	Catalina	CSS	·	700 m	MPC · JPL
675156	2015 UC_{7}	—	October 12, 2006	Palomar	NEAT	·	1.8 km	MPC · JPL
675157	2015 UD_{10}	—	September 12, 2015	Haleakala	Pan-STARRS 1	·	2.6 km	MPC · JPL
675158	2015 UF_{17}	—	October 28, 2005	Mount Lemmon	Mount Lemmon Survey	·	760 m	MPC · JPL
675159	2015 UD_{18}	—	September 7, 2008	Mount Lemmon	Mount Lemmon Survey	·	3.6 km	MPC · JPL
675160	2015 UH_{18}	—	September 12, 2015	Haleakala	Pan-STARRS 1	·	860 m	MPC · JPL
675161	2015 UY_{21}	—	September 26, 2011	Haleakala	Pan-STARRS 1	·	880 m	MPC · JPL
675162	2015 UE_{24}	—	July 26, 2011	Haleakala	Pan-STARRS 1	·	600 m	MPC · JPL
675163	2015 UW_{24}	—	November 13, 2010	Kitt Peak	Spacewatch	·	2.5 km	MPC · JPL
675164	2015 UN_{25}	—	July 31, 2009	Kitt Peak	Spacewatch	·	2.1 km	MPC · JPL
675165	2015 UJ_{27}	—	March 17, 2013	Kitt Peak	Spacewatch	HYG	2.6 km	MPC · JPL
675166	2015 UX_{27}	—	September 29, 2008	Kitt Peak	Spacewatch	·	450 m	MPC · JPL
675167	2015 UC_{28}	—	August 21, 2015	Haleakala	Pan-STARRS 1	·	950 m	MPC · JPL
675168	2015 US_{29}	—	January 18, 2013	Haleakala	Pan-STARRS 1	·	750 m	MPC · JPL
675169	2015 UF_{31}	—	December 8, 2010	Catalina	CSS	·	2.4 km	MPC · JPL
675170	2015 UH_{33}	—	August 17, 2006	Palomar	NEAT	·	1.6 km	MPC · JPL
675171	2015 UA_{37}	—	October 29, 2005	Mount Lemmon	Mount Lemmon Survey	·	1.7 km	MPC · JPL
675172	2015 UK_{41}	—	October 8, 2007	Mount Lemmon	Mount Lemmon Survey	·	870 m	MPC · JPL
675173	2015 UO_{42}	—	April 10, 2013	Mount Lemmon	Mount Lemmon Survey	EOS	1.7 km	MPC · JPL
675174	2015 UH_{44}	—	August 30, 2015	Haleakala	Pan-STARRS 1	PHO	900 m	MPC · JPL
675175	2015 UP_{45}	—	August 27, 2014	Haleakala	Pan-STARRS 1	·	2.2 km	MPC · JPL
675176	2015 UU_{46}	—	July 1, 2014	Haleakala	Pan-STARRS 1	·	2.5 km	MPC · JPL
675177	2015 UA_{48}	—	October 18, 2015	Haleakala	Pan-STARRS 1	·	890 m	MPC · JPL
675178	2015 UZ_{48}	—	October 12, 2006	Palomar	NEAT	·	1.7 km	MPC · JPL
675179	2015 UR_{52}	—	May 6, 2014	Haleakala	Pan-STARRS 1	H	490 m	MPC · JPL
675180	2015 UP_{59}	—	November 12, 2010	Mount Lemmon	Mount Lemmon Survey	EOS	1.5 km	MPC · JPL
675181	2015 UJ_{60}	—	October 8, 2015	Haleakala	Pan-STARRS 1	·	1.4 km	MPC · JPL
675182	2015 UP_{61}	—	September 17, 2006	Kitt Peak	Spacewatch	·	1.8 km	MPC · JPL
675183	2015 UT_{62}	—	October 1, 2005	Mount Lemmon	Mount Lemmon Survey	·	610 m	MPC · JPL
675184	2015 UA_{66}	—	January 29, 2006	Catalina	CSS	EOS	1.8 km	MPC · JPL
675185	2015 UD_{66}	—	October 21, 2015	Haleakala	Pan-STARRS 1	EUN	920 m	MPC · JPL
675186	2015 UZ_{70}	—	October 26, 2011	Haleakala	Pan-STARRS 1	·	1.6 km	MPC · JPL
675187	2015 UF_{71}	—	November 10, 2010	Mount Lemmon	Mount Lemmon Survey	·	2.2 km	MPC · JPL
675188	2015 US_{71}	—	October 22, 2006	Catalina	CSS	·	2.2 km	MPC · JPL
675189	2015 UU_{71}	—	October 6, 2008	Mount Lemmon	Mount Lemmon Survey	·	780 m	MPC · JPL
675190	2015 UH_{72}	—	October 22, 2015	Haleakala	Pan-STARRS 1	·	990 m	MPC · JPL
675191	2015 UO_{73}	—	April 19, 2007	Mount Lemmon	Mount Lemmon Survey	V	480 m	MPC · JPL
675192	2015 UK_{75}	—	March 27, 2008	Mount Lemmon	Mount Lemmon Survey	·	2.1 km	MPC · JPL
675193	2015 UQ_{75}	—	September 25, 2009	Zelenchukskaya Station	T. V. Krjačko, B. Satovski	·	3.1 km	MPC · JPL
675194	2015 UD_{76}	—	December 1, 2005	Kitt Peak	Wasserman, L. H., Millis, R. L.	V	590 m	MPC · JPL
675195	2015 UC_{78}	—	September 19, 2015	Haleakala	Pan-STARRS 1	·	950 m	MPC · JPL
675196	2015 UU_{82}	—	August 19, 2006	Kitt Peak	Spacewatch	·	1.7 km	MPC · JPL
675197	2015 UY_{82}	—	June 4, 2014	Haleakala	Pan-STARRS 1	·	2.4 km	MPC · JPL
675198	2015 UU_{83}	—	June 27, 2011	Mount Lemmon	Mount Lemmon Survey	·	900 m	MPC · JPL
675199	2015 UW_{83}	—	October 10, 2015	Haleakala	Pan-STARRS 1	·	770 m	MPC · JPL
675200	2015 UC_{84}	—	February 24, 2006	Palomar	NEAT	·	3.0 km	MPC · JPL

== 675201–675300 ==
back to top

Designation			Discovery			Properties		Ref
Permanent	Provisional	Named after	Date	Site	Discoverer(s)	Category	Diam.	Ref
675201	2015 UF_{87}	—	December 10, 2010	Mount Lemmon	Mount Lemmon Survey	EOS	1.7 km	MPC · JPL
675202	2015 UM_{87}	—	October 21, 2015	Haleakala	Pan-STARRS 1	·	2.0 km	MPC · JPL
675203	2015 US_{87}	—	February 8, 2011	Mount Lemmon	Mount Lemmon Survey	·	2.9 km	MPC · JPL
675204	2015 UC_{93}	—	October 21, 2015	Haleakala	Pan-STARRS 1	·	1.0 km	MPC · JPL
675205	2015 US_{93}	—	October 24, 2015	Haleakala	Pan-STARRS 1	·	2.3 km	MPC · JPL
675206	2015 UV_{93}	—	October 19, 2015	Haleakala	Pan-STARRS 1	·	700 m	MPC · JPL
675207	2015 UU_{96}	—	October 24, 2015	Haleakala	Pan-STARRS 1	·	940 m	MPC · JPL
675208	2015 UG_{98}	—	October 18, 2015	Haleakala	Pan-STARRS 1	H	330 m	MPC · JPL
675209	2015 UP_{98}	—	October 23, 2015	Mount Lemmon	Mount Lemmon Survey	·	2.5 km	MPC · JPL
675210	2015 UZ_{103}	—	October 21, 2015	Haleakala	Pan-STARRS 1	·	910 m	MPC · JPL
675211	2015 VL	—	February 25, 2014	Haleakala	Pan-STARRS 1	H	360 m	MPC · JPL
675212	2015 VR	—	March 31, 2009	Mount Lemmon	Mount Lemmon Survey	H	440 m	MPC · JPL
675213	2015 VU	—	November 1, 2005	Mauna Kea	P. A. Wiegert, D. D. Balam	·	630 m	MPC · JPL
675214	2015 VR_{1}	—	November 2, 2015	Mount Lemmon	Mount Lemmon Survey	AMO · APO	240 m	MPC · JPL
675215	2015 VB_{5}	—	November 15, 2010	Mount Lemmon	Mount Lemmon Survey	·	2.0 km	MPC · JPL
675216	2015 VO_{6}	—	July 13, 2004	Siding Spring	SSS	·	2.9 km	MPC · JPL
675217	2015 VN_{7}	—	September 6, 2015	Haleakala	Pan-STARRS 1	·	1.8 km	MPC · JPL
675218	2015 VC_{8}	—	September 10, 2015	Haleakala	Pan-STARRS 1	·	2.5 km	MPC · JPL
675219	2015 VT_{8}	—	September 5, 2008	Kitt Peak	Spacewatch	·	660 m	MPC · JPL
675220	2015 VB_{9}	—	October 11, 2005	Kitt Peak	Spacewatch	·	590 m	MPC · JPL
675221	2015 VM_{10}	—	November 16, 2010	Mount Lemmon	Mount Lemmon Survey	LUT	4.1 km	MPC · JPL
675222	2015 VU_{12}	—	March 29, 2008	Kitt Peak	Spacewatch	·	2.7 km	MPC · JPL
675223	2015 VU_{14}	—	August 12, 2015	Haleakala	Pan-STARRS 1	THM	1.8 km	MPC · JPL
675224	2015 VS_{19}	—	October 20, 2008	Kitt Peak	Spacewatch	·	680 m	MPC · JPL
675225	2015 VZ_{19}	—	September 12, 2015	Haleakala	Pan-STARRS 1	VER	2.2 km	MPC · JPL
675226	2015 VG_{20}	—	August 18, 2009	Kitt Peak	Spacewatch	·	2.8 km	MPC · JPL
675227	2015 VR_{20}	—	September 12, 2015	Haleakala	Pan-STARRS 1	·	1.8 km	MPC · JPL
675228	2015 VG_{21}	—	November 13, 2010	Mount Lemmon	Mount Lemmon Survey	·	2.5 km	MPC · JPL
675229	2015 VH_{23}	—	July 25, 2015	Haleakala	Pan-STARRS 1	·	2.5 km	MPC · JPL
675230	2015 VO_{24}	—	October 8, 2015	Haleakala	Pan-STARRS 1	·	3.1 km	MPC · JPL
675231	2015 VG_{28}	—	March 12, 2010	Kitt Peak	Spacewatch	V	650 m	MPC · JPL
675232	2015 VS_{28}	—	September 11, 2009	Zelenchukskaya Station	T. V. Krjačko, B. Satovski	·	2.8 km	MPC · JPL
675233	2015 VX_{29}	—	November 2, 2008	Mount Lemmon	Mount Lemmon Survey	·	720 m	MPC · JPL
675234	2015 VD_{30}	—	November 1, 2015	Haleakala	Pan-STARRS 1	·	1.2 km	MPC · JPL
675235	2015 VX_{30}	—	October 23, 2015	Mount Lemmon	Mount Lemmon Survey	·	1.5 km	MPC · JPL
675236	2015 VY_{31}	—	October 11, 2004	Kitt Peak	Deep Ecliptic Survey	·	2.7 km	MPC · JPL
675237	2015 VK_{34}	—	October 29, 2008	Kitt Peak	Spacewatch	V	390 m	MPC · JPL
675238	2015 VR_{36}	—	March 27, 2012	Mount Lemmon	Mount Lemmon Survey	·	3.9 km	MPC · JPL
675239	2015 VC_{37}	—	December 14, 2010	Mount Lemmon	Mount Lemmon Survey	EOS	1.4 km	MPC · JPL
675240	2015 VN_{37}	—	October 22, 2005	Kitt Peak	Spacewatch	·	1.7 km	MPC · JPL
675241	2015 VV_{37}	—	November 24, 2011	Haleakala	Pan-STARRS 1	·	860 m	MPC · JPL
675242	2015 VA_{39}	—	September 20, 2009	Mount Lemmon	Mount Lemmon Survey	·	3.2 km	MPC · JPL
675243	2015 VO_{40}	—	September 1, 2005	Palomar	NEAT	·	2.1 km	MPC · JPL
675244	2015 VR_{40}	—	October 9, 2015	Haleakala	Pan-STARRS 1	·	2.5 km	MPC · JPL
675245	2015 VW_{40}	—	May 6, 2014	Haleakala	Pan-STARRS 1	·	2.2 km	MPC · JPL
675246	2015 VM_{41}	—	September 20, 2015	Mount Lemmon	Mount Lemmon Survey	H	350 m	MPC · JPL
675247	2015 VT_{43}	—	September 17, 2010	Kitt Peak	Spacewatch	·	2.6 km	MPC · JPL
675248	2015 VE_{44}	—	August 21, 2015	Haleakala	Pan-STARRS 1	·	930 m	MPC · JPL
675249	2015 VN_{45}	—	May 7, 2005	Kitt Peak	Spacewatch	·	1.9 km	MPC · JPL
675250	2015 VE_{47}	—	March 14, 2012	Mount Lemmon	Mount Lemmon Survey	TIR	2.4 km	MPC · JPL
675251	2015 VX_{48}	—	October 23, 2011	Kitt Peak	Spacewatch	·	1.7 km	MPC · JPL
675252	2015 VM_{54}	—	November 2, 2015	Haleakala	Pan-STARRS 1	·	2.4 km	MPC · JPL
675253	2015 VT_{54}	—	November 2, 2015	Haleakala	Pan-STARRS 1	·	920 m	MPC · JPL
675254	2015 VG_{55}	—	April 6, 2008	Mount Lemmon	Mount Lemmon Survey	·	1.7 km	MPC · JPL
675255	2015 VM_{56}	—	March 12, 2007	Kitt Peak	Spacewatch	EOS	1.5 km	MPC · JPL
675256	2015 VZ_{56}	—	March 7, 2008	Kitt Peak	Spacewatch	KOR	1.3 km	MPC · JPL
675257	2015 VH_{60}	—	October 14, 2015	XuYi	PMO NEO Survey Program	·	700 m	MPC · JPL
675258	2015 VZ_{60}	—	April 7, 2008	Kitt Peak	Spacewatch	·	640 m	MPC · JPL
675259	2015 VF_{61}	—	April 8, 2013	Mount Lemmon	Mount Lemmon Survey	·	2.7 km	MPC · JPL
675260	2015 VA_{62}	—	March 27, 2008	Mount Lemmon	Mount Lemmon Survey	·	1.8 km	MPC · JPL
675261	2015 VT_{63}	—	September 30, 2005	Anderson Mesa	LONEOS	·	2.4 km	MPC · JPL
675262	2015 VW_{65}	—	December 13, 2002	Socorro	LINEAR	·	520 m	MPC · JPL
675263	2015 VV_{69}	—	February 16, 2013	Kitt Peak	Spacewatch	MAS	500 m	MPC · JPL
675264	2015 VP_{70}	—	August 21, 2015	Haleakala	Pan-STARRS 1	·	2.9 km	MPC · JPL
675265	2015 VL_{71}	—	August 16, 2009	Kitt Peak	Spacewatch	·	2.4 km	MPC · JPL
675266	2015 VJ_{72}	—	October 24, 2005	Mauna Kea	A. Boattini	EOS	2.2 km	MPC · JPL
675267	2015 VD_{73}	—	October 10, 2015	Kitt Peak	Spacewatch	·	3.8 km	MPC · JPL
675268	2015 VU_{73}	—	June 26, 2015	Haleakala	Pan-STARRS 1	(1338) (FLO)	520 m	MPC · JPL
675269	2015 VC_{75}	—	August 12, 2015	Haleakala	Pan-STARRS 1	H	350 m	MPC · JPL
675270	2015 VH_{75}	—	March 6, 2013	Haleakala	Pan-STARRS 1	·	1.1 km	MPC · JPL
675271	2015 VU_{75}	—	December 4, 2010	Mount Lemmon	Mount Lemmon Survey	LIX	3.1 km	MPC · JPL
675272	2015 VK_{76}	—	September 9, 2015	Haleakala	Pan-STARRS 1	·	600 m	MPC · JPL
675273	2015 VG_{77}	—	November 6, 2015	Mount Lemmon	Mount Lemmon Survey	·	1.2 km	MPC · JPL
675274	2015 VC_{78}	—	September 16, 2009	Kitt Peak	Spacewatch	·	2.9 km	MPC · JPL
675275	2015 VH_{80}	—	September 23, 2008	Mount Lemmon	Mount Lemmon Survey	·	790 m	MPC · JPL
675276	2015 VL_{80}	—	September 30, 2010	Mount Lemmon	Mount Lemmon Survey	·	1.9 km	MPC · JPL
675277	2015 VB_{81}	—	September 9, 2015	Haleakala	Pan-STARRS 1	·	820 m	MPC · JPL
675278	2015 VE_{81}	—	July 25, 2011	Haleakala	Pan-STARRS 1	·	970 m	MPC · JPL
675279	2015 VN_{81}	—	April 22, 2013	Mount Lemmon	Mount Lemmon Survey	·	3.2 km	MPC · JPL
675280	2015 VH_{83}	—	November 6, 2008	Catalina	CSS	·	870 m	MPC · JPL
675281	2015 VB_{85}	—	September 9, 2015	Haleakala	Pan-STARRS 1	·	1.7 km	MPC · JPL
675282	2015 VU_{85}	—	April 5, 2008	Mount Lemmon	Mount Lemmon Survey	·	1.8 km	MPC · JPL
675283	2015 VJ_{86}	—	August 21, 2015	Haleakala	Pan-STARRS 1	·	2.7 km	MPC · JPL
675284	2015 VT_{87}	—	November 6, 2010	Mount Lemmon	Mount Lemmon Survey	·	3.5 km	MPC · JPL
675285	2015 VA_{88}	—	October 29, 2010	Kitt Peak	Spacewatch	·	3.1 km	MPC · JPL
675286	2015 VH_{88}	—	July 26, 2014	Haleakala	Pan-STARRS 1	·	1.0 km	MPC · JPL
675287	2015 VY_{88}	—	March 18, 2013	Mount Lemmon	Mount Lemmon Survey	·	800 m	MPC · JPL
675288	2015 VH_{90}	—	September 17, 2009	Mount Lemmon	Mount Lemmon Survey	·	2.3 km	MPC · JPL
675289	2015 VK_{90}	—	October 26, 2008	Kitt Peak	Spacewatch	·	610 m	MPC · JPL
675290	2015 VV_{90}	—	October 9, 2010	Mount Lemmon	Mount Lemmon Survey	·	1.7 km	MPC · JPL
675291	2015 VP_{91}	—	September 10, 2009	ESA OGS	ESA OGS	·	3.5 km	MPC · JPL
675292	2015 VU_{91}	—	November 20, 2008	Kitt Peak	Spacewatch	·	860 m	MPC · JPL
675293	2015 VT_{94}	—	September 9, 2015	Haleakala	Pan-STARRS 1	·	2.3 km	MPC · JPL
675294	2015 VW_{94}	—	August 12, 2015	Haleakala	Pan-STARRS 1	·	3.1 km	MPC · JPL
675295	2015 VJ_{97}	—	September 2, 2011	Haleakala	Pan-STARRS 1	·	850 m	MPC · JPL
675296	2015 VM_{97}	—	May 7, 2014	Haleakala	Pan-STARRS 1	·	2.4 km	MPC · JPL
675297	2015 VR_{98}	—	November 7, 2015	Mount Lemmon	Mount Lemmon Survey	MAS	520 m	MPC · JPL
675298	2015 VO_{99}	—	January 7, 2006	Mount Lemmon	Mount Lemmon Survey	·	2.3 km	MPC · JPL
675299	2015 VT_{99}	—	October 7, 2004	Kitt Peak	Spacewatch	·	1.1 km	MPC · JPL
675300	2015 VW_{101}	—	March 19, 2013	Haleakala	Pan-STARRS 1	·	1.6 km	MPC · JPL

== 675301–675400 ==
back to top

Designation			Discovery			Properties		Ref
Permanent	Provisional	Named after	Date	Site	Discoverer(s)	Category	Diam.	Ref
675301	2015 VD_{102}	—	November 26, 2005	Kitt Peak	Spacewatch	EOS	1.6 km	MPC · JPL
675302	2015 VN_{103}	—	September 9, 2015	Haleakala	Pan-STARRS 1	EOS	1.2 km	MPC · JPL
675303	2015 VA_{107}	—	October 10, 2015	Haleakala	Pan-STARRS 1	·	1.2 km	MPC · JPL
675304	2015 VF_{109}	—	September 9, 2015	Haleakala	Pan-STARRS 1	·	2.8 km	MPC · JPL
675305	2015 VR_{109}	—	February 4, 2006	Kitt Peak	Spacewatch	NYS	860 m	MPC · JPL
675306	2015 VQ_{111}	—	October 31, 2010	Kitt Peak	Spacewatch	·	1.7 km	MPC · JPL
675307	2015 VT_{111}	—	April 15, 2012	Haleakala	Pan-STARRS 1	·	2.9 km	MPC · JPL
675308	2015 VL_{112}	—	March 26, 2009	Mount Lemmon	Mount Lemmon Survey	H	330 m	MPC · JPL
675309	2015 VO_{112}	—	October 10, 2015	Haleakala	Pan-STARRS 1	TIR	2.7 km	MPC · JPL
675310	2015 VS_{113}	—	September 3, 2002	Palomar	NEAT	EUN	1.3 km	MPC · JPL
675311	2015 VW_{113}	—	September 19, 2015	Haleakala	Pan-STARRS 1	·	1.0 km	MPC · JPL
675312	2015 VR_{114}	—	March 19, 2013	Haleakala	Pan-STARRS 1	·	1.9 km	MPC · JPL
675313	2015 VD_{115}	—	September 7, 2008	Mount Lemmon	Mount Lemmon Survey	·	650 m	MPC · JPL
675314	2015 VP_{117}	—	January 2, 2012	Catalina	CSS	·	1.5 km	MPC · JPL
675315	2015 VU_{117}	—	September 9, 2004	Kitt Peak	Spacewatch	·	1.7 km	MPC · JPL
675316	2015 VS_{118}	—	October 19, 2007	Catalina	CSS	T_{j} (2.94)	2.8 km	MPC · JPL
675317	2015 VP_{119}	—	December 19, 2004	Mount Lemmon	Mount Lemmon Survey	·	4.0 km	MPC · JPL
675318	2015 VX_{119}	—	December 14, 2010	Mount Lemmon	Mount Lemmon Survey	·	1.5 km	MPC · JPL
675319	2015 VW_{123}	—	October 24, 2015	Haleakala	Pan-STARRS 1	MAS	600 m	MPC · JPL
675320	2015 VX_{123}	—	December 14, 2010	Mount Lemmon	Mount Lemmon Survey	·	1.5 km	MPC · JPL
675321	2015 VT_{124}	—	March 16, 2013	Mount Lemmon	Mount Lemmon Survey	·	3.9 km	MPC · JPL
675322	2015 VW_{124}	—	November 12, 2006	Mount Lemmon	Mount Lemmon Survey	·	1.9 km	MPC · JPL
675323	2015 VD_{125}	—	November 12, 2010	Catalina	CSS	·	2.5 km	MPC · JPL
675324	2015 VJ_{127}	—	September 29, 2008	Mount Lemmon	Mount Lemmon Survey	·	760 m	MPC · JPL
675325	2015 VV_{127}	—	September 27, 2009	Mount Lemmon	Mount Lemmon Survey	·	2.7 km	MPC · JPL
675326	2015 VP_{128}	—	March 6, 2013	Haleakala	Pan-STARRS 1	·	740 m	MPC · JPL
675327	2015 VH_{130}	—	October 9, 2004	Kitt Peak	Spacewatch	·	2.7 km	MPC · JPL
675328	2015 VL_{130}	—	November 8, 2010	Kitt Peak	Spacewatch	·	1.6 km	MPC · JPL
675329	2015 VB_{131}	—	July 4, 2014	Haleakala	Pan-STARRS 1	·	2.2 km	MPC · JPL
675330	2015 VN_{131}	—	October 5, 2004	Anderson Mesa	LONEOS	NYS	910 m	MPC · JPL
675331	2015 VX_{131}	—	November 17, 2011	Mount Lemmon	Mount Lemmon Survey	·	2.4 km	MPC · JPL
675332	2015 VD_{132}	—	November 28, 2011	Kitt Peak	Spacewatch	·	1.6 km	MPC · JPL
675333	2015 VT_{132}	—	February 27, 2012	Haleakala	Pan-STARRS 1	·	2.3 km	MPC · JPL
675334	2015 VC_{133}	—	October 11, 2015	ESA OGS	ESA OGS	·	750 m	MPC · JPL
675335	2015 VH_{133}	—	February 14, 2013	Haleakala	Pan-STARRS 1	·	970 m	MPC · JPL
675336	2015 VD_{134}	—	May 8, 2013	Haleakala	Pan-STARRS 1	EOS	1.8 km	MPC · JPL
675337	2015 VH_{134}	—	November 1, 2015	Haleakala	Pan-STARRS 1	H	360 m	MPC · JPL
675338	2015 VP_{134}	—	November 24, 2000	Kitt Peak	Spacewatch	·	880 m	MPC · JPL
675339	2015 VD_{137}	—	October 7, 2004	Kitt Peak	Spacewatch	·	3.1 km	MPC · JPL
675340	2015 VH_{138}	—	October 1, 2005	Mount Lemmon	Mount Lemmon Survey	·	2.1 km	MPC · JPL
675341	2015 VN_{139}	—	October 16, 2001	Socorro	LINEAR	GAL	1.7 km	MPC · JPL
675342	2015 VJ_{141}	—	December 13, 2010	Mauna Kea	M. Micheli, L. Wells	·	3.5 km	MPC · JPL
675343	2015 VL_{143}	—	April 2, 2014	Mount Lemmon	Mount Lemmon Survey	H	510 m	MPC · JPL
675344	2015 VY_{145}	—	November 11, 2004	Kitt Peak	Spacewatch	·	3.6 km	MPC · JPL
675345	2015 VS_{150}	—	November 8, 2007	Mount Lemmon	Mount Lemmon Survey	·	630 m	MPC · JPL
675346	2015 VY_{152}	—	November 8, 2015	Mount Lemmon	Mount Lemmon Survey	H	580 m	MPC · JPL
675347	2015 VD_{153}	—	April 29, 2014	Haleakala	Pan-STARRS 1	H	380 m	MPC · JPL
675348	2015 VM_{153}	—	November 9, 2015	Catalina	CSS	H	480 m	MPC · JPL
675349	2015 VQ_{153}	—	November 1, 2015	Kitt Peak	Spacewatch	·	920 m	MPC · JPL
675350	2015 VL_{155}	—	November 7, 2015	Mount Lemmon	Mount Lemmon Survey	·	3.9 km	MPC · JPL
675351	2015 VE_{156}	—	September 11, 2010	Kitt Peak	Spacewatch	·	1.7 km	MPC · JPL
675352	2015 VF_{157}	—	February 15, 2013	Haleakala	Pan-STARRS 1	·	800 m	MPC · JPL
675353	2015 VN_{159}	—	November 28, 2011	Kitt Peak	Spacewatch	·	1.3 km	MPC · JPL
675354	2015 VP_{159}	—	April 15, 2013	Haleakala	Pan-STARRS 1	(43176)	2.8 km	MPC · JPL
675355	2015 VV_{162}	—	December 19, 2004	Mount Lemmon	Mount Lemmon Survey	THM	2.1 km	MPC · JPL
675356	2015 VQ_{175}	—	November 12, 2015	Mount Lemmon	Mount Lemmon Survey	·	760 m	MPC · JPL
675357	2015 VU_{177}	—	November 2, 2015	Mount Lemmon	Mount Lemmon Survey	·	670 m	MPC · JPL
675358	2015 VT_{178}	—	November 9, 2015	Mount Lemmon	Mount Lemmon Survey	·	510 m	MPC · JPL
675359	2015 VX_{178}	—	November 8, 2015	Mount Lemmon	Mount Lemmon Survey	PHO	600 m	MPC · JPL
675360	2015 VD_{179}	—	November 7, 2015	Mount Lemmon	Mount Lemmon Survey	·	1.9 km	MPC · JPL
675361	2015 VK_{185}	—	March 17, 2013	Mount Lemmon	Mount Lemmon Survey	·	750 m	MPC · JPL
675362	2015 VL_{186}	—	November 7, 2015	Haleakala	Pan-STARRS 1	·	900 m	MPC · JPL
675363	2015 VM_{186}	—	November 7, 2015	Haleakala	Pan-STARRS 1	·	710 m	MPC · JPL
675364	2015 VN_{187}	—	November 8, 2015	Haleakala	Pan-STARRS 1	·	1.0 km	MPC · JPL
675365	2015 VL_{189}	—	November 2, 2015	Haleakala	Pan-STARRS 1	H	340 m	MPC · JPL
675366	2015 VT_{198}	—	November 13, 2015	Mount Lemmon	Mount Lemmon Survey	·	1.5 km	MPC · JPL
675367	2015 VG_{202}	—	November 3, 2015	Mount Lemmon	Mount Lemmon Survey	PHO	610 m	MPC · JPL
675368	2015 VT_{202}	—	November 6, 2015	Mount Lemmon	Mount Lemmon Survey	·	960 m	MPC · JPL
675369	2015 WB	—	April 27, 2012	Kitt Peak	Spacewatch	H	460 m	MPC · JPL
675370	2015 WE	—	April 20, 2004	Kitt Peak	Spacewatch	·	740 m	MPC · JPL
675371	2015 WK_{1}	—	June 26, 2011	Mount Lemmon	Mount Lemmon Survey	PHO	770 m	MPC · JPL
675372	2015 WW_{2}	—	October 19, 2003	Palomar	NEAT	·	3.0 km	MPC · JPL
675373	2015 WY_{2}	—	November 24, 2011	Mount Lemmon	Mount Lemmon Survey	EUN	1.1 km	MPC · JPL
675374	2015 WQ_{5}	—	November 1, 2000	Kitt Peak	Spacewatch	·	1.0 km	MPC · JPL
675375	2015 WS_{5}	—	May 14, 2008	Mount Lemmon	Mount Lemmon Survey	·	2.8 km	MPC · JPL
675376	2015 WK_{9}	—	September 24, 2015	Mount Lemmon	Mount Lemmon Survey	·	1.1 km	MPC · JPL
675377	2015 WO_{10}	—	December 21, 2005	Kitt Peak	Spacewatch	EOS	2.1 km	MPC · JPL
675378	2015 WW_{10}	—	November 20, 2015	Mount Lemmon	Mount Lemmon Survey	·	1.8 km	MPC · JPL
675379	2015 WW_{14}	—	September 23, 2015	Haleakala	Pan-STARRS 1	·	860 m	MPC · JPL
675380	2015 WS_{15}	—	September 23, 2015	Haleakala	Pan-STARRS 1	H	550 m	MPC · JPL
675381	2015 WV_{15}	—	June 2, 2014	Mount Lemmon	Mount Lemmon Survey	·	1.1 km	MPC · JPL
675382	2015 WS_{16}	—	November 16, 2015	Haleakala	Pan-STARRS 1	H	360 m	MPC · JPL
675383	2015 WR_{17}	—	February 20, 2012	Haleakala	Pan-STARRS 1	EOS	2.0 km	MPC · JPL
675384	2015 WW_{17}	—	November 22, 2015	Mount Lemmon	Mount Lemmon Survey	·	1.4 km	MPC · JPL
675385	2015 WM_{18}	—	June 18, 2010	Mount Lemmon	Mount Lemmon Survey	EUN	1.2 km	MPC · JPL
675386	2015 WV_{18}	—	February 15, 2013	Haleakala	Pan-STARRS 1	V	500 m	MPC · JPL
675387	2015 WG_{19}	—	February 27, 2012	Haleakala	Pan-STARRS 1	VER	2.1 km	MPC · JPL
675388	2015 WJ_{19}	—	September 22, 2003	Kitt Peak	Spacewatch	·	2.5 km	MPC · JPL
675389	2015 WC_{21}	—	May 16, 2010	Kitt Peak	Spacewatch	·	1.3 km	MPC · JPL
675390	2015 WK_{21}	—	October 16, 2015	Mount Lemmon	Mount Lemmon Survey	·	1.3 km	MPC · JPL
675391	2015 WE_{22}	—	October 25, 2011	Haleakala	Pan-STARRS 1	·	1.1 km	MPC · JPL
675392	2015 WA_{28}	—	November 21, 2015	Mount Lemmon	Mount Lemmon Survey	·	670 m	MPC · JPL
675393	2015 WG_{28}	—	November 22, 2015	Mount Lemmon	Mount Lemmon Survey	·	1.2 km	MPC · JPL
675394	2015 WT_{28}	—	December 22, 2008	Kitt Peak	Spacewatch	MAS	560 m	MPC · JPL
675395	2015 WL_{29}	—	November 20, 2015	Mount Lemmon	Mount Lemmon Survey	H	500 m	MPC · JPL
675396	2015 WR_{29}	—	November 19, 2015	Mount Lemmon	Mount Lemmon Survey	H	420 m	MPC · JPL
675397	2015 WM_{37}	—	November 18, 2015	Haleakala	Pan-STARRS 1	H	440 m	MPC · JPL
675398	2015 XP_{1}	—	October 8, 2007	Catalina	CSS	H	390 m	MPC · JPL
675399	2015 XA_{4}	—	March 25, 2007	Mount Lemmon	Mount Lemmon Survey	·	2.2 km	MPC · JPL
675400	2015 XO_{5}	—	August 23, 2014	Haleakala	Pan-STARRS 1	·	2.5 km	MPC · JPL

== 675401–675500 ==
back to top

Designation			Discovery			Properties		Ref
Permanent	Provisional	Named after	Date	Site	Discoverer(s)	Category	Diam.	Ref
675401	2015 XW_{5}	—	November 2, 2015	Haleakala	Pan-STARRS 1	·	770 m	MPC · JPL
675402	2015 XJ_{9}	—	November 19, 2009	Kitt Peak	Spacewatch	·	2.7 km	MPC · JPL
675403	2015 XN_{9}	—	October 21, 2015	Haleakala	Pan-STARRS 1	EUN	1.1 km	MPC · JPL
675404	2015 XV_{11}	—	November 2, 2008	Mount Lemmon	Mount Lemmon Survey	T_{j} (2.94)	3.4 km	MPC · JPL
675405	2015 XL_{13}	—	October 8, 2015	Haleakala	Pan-STARRS 1	·	1.5 km	MPC · JPL
675406	2015 XO_{13}	—	January 10, 2013	Haleakala	Pan-STARRS 1	·	870 m	MPC · JPL
675407	2015 XS_{17}	—	December 13, 2006	Kitt Peak	Spacewatch	·	1.4 km	MPC · JPL
675408	2015 XH_{18}	—	November 10, 2004	Kitt Peak	Spacewatch	PHO	580 m	MPC · JPL
675409	2015 XL_{18}	—	March 13, 2012	Haleakala	Pan-STARRS 1	·	3.0 km	MPC · JPL
675410	2015 XL_{21}	—	October 10, 2015	Haleakala	Pan-STARRS 1	·	850 m	MPC · JPL
675411	2015 XH_{22}	—	November 7, 2015	Haleakala	Pan-STARRS 1	·	770 m	MPC · JPL
675412	2015 XG_{24}	—	October 8, 2015	Haleakala	Pan-STARRS 1	·	910 m	MPC · JPL
675413	2015 XH_{24}	—	March 15, 2012	Mount Lemmon	Mount Lemmon Survey	·	1.5 km	MPC · JPL
675414	2015 XR_{27}	—	October 24, 2015	Mount Lemmon	Mount Lemmon Survey	NYS	850 m	MPC · JPL
675415	2015 XG_{28}	—	November 1, 2015	Kitt Peak	Spacewatch	·	970 m	MPC · JPL
675416	2015 XE_{29}	—	January 2, 2011	Mount Lemmon	Mount Lemmon Survey	·	2.4 km	MPC · JPL
675417	2015 XB_{30}	—	November 18, 2015	Haleakala	Pan-STARRS 1	·	520 m	MPC · JPL
675418	2015 XB_{31}	—	November 1, 2015	Kitt Peak	Spacewatch	·	750 m	MPC · JPL
675419	2015 XM_{40}	—	December 2, 2015	Haleakala	Pan-STARRS 1	·	2.5 km	MPC · JPL
675420	2015 XN_{47}	—	September 1, 2010	Mount Lemmon	Mount Lemmon Survey	·	1.2 km	MPC · JPL
675421	2015 XJ_{48}	—	December 2, 2015	Haleakala	Pan-STARRS 1	·	560 m	MPC · JPL
675422	2015 XA_{49}	—	November 13, 2015	Mount Lemmon	Mount Lemmon Survey	·	770 m	MPC · JPL
675423	2015 XH_{51}	—	May 3, 2008	Mount Lemmon	Mount Lemmon Survey	EOS	2.0 km	MPC · JPL
675424	2015 XR_{51}	—	November 9, 2015	Mount Lemmon	Mount Lemmon Survey	PHO	690 m	MPC · JPL
675425	2015 XZ_{51}	—	February 16, 2012	Haleakala	Pan-STARRS 1	EOS	1.9 km	MPC · JPL
675426	2015 XE_{53}	—	December 2, 2015	Haleakala	Pan-STARRS 1	·	1.0 km	MPC · JPL
675427	2015 XU_{53}	—	October 19, 2015	Haleakala	Pan-STARRS 1	·	730 m	MPC · JPL
675428	2015 XS_{55}	—	September 22, 2015	Haleakala	Pan-STARRS 1	H	430 m	MPC · JPL
675429	2015 XY_{55}	—	January 25, 2009	Catalina	CSS	·	900 m	MPC · JPL
675430	2015 XB_{56}	—	September 23, 2015	Haleakala	Pan-STARRS 1	H	390 m	MPC · JPL
675431	2015 XM_{56}	—	May 31, 2011	Mount Lemmon	Mount Lemmon Survey	·	490 m	MPC · JPL
675432	2015 XW_{56}	—	January 22, 2013	Kitt Peak	Spacewatch	·	1.1 km	MPC · JPL
675433	2015 XD_{57}	—	November 18, 2015	Kitt Peak	Spacewatch	·	950 m	MPC · JPL
675434	2015 XM_{58}	—	March 13, 2003	Kitt Peak	Spacewatch	V	660 m	MPC · JPL
675435	2015 XE_{59}	—	September 22, 2009	Kitt Peak	Spacewatch	·	2.3 km	MPC · JPL
675436	2015 XJ_{59}	—	November 17, 2009	Mount Lemmon	Mount Lemmon Survey	·	2.8 km	MPC · JPL
675437	2015 XM_{60}	—	April 29, 2008	Kitt Peak	Spacewatch	EOS	1.5 km	MPC · JPL
675438	2015 XK_{62}	—	December 1, 2015	Haleakala	Pan-STARRS 1	(5)	770 m	MPC · JPL
675439	2015 XT_{64}	—	August 31, 2005	Kitt Peak	Spacewatch	·	2.0 km	MPC · JPL
675440	2015 XW_{69}	—	December 10, 2004	Kitt Peak	Spacewatch	·	3.6 km	MPC · JPL
675441	2015 XH_{72}	—	January 3, 2012	Kitt Peak	Spacewatch	·	2.7 km	MPC · JPL
675442	2015 XK_{73}	—	March 24, 2006	Mount Lemmon	Mount Lemmon Survey	·	680 m	MPC · JPL
675443	2015 XX_{73}	—	July 14, 2009	Kitt Peak	Spacewatch	·	2.3 km	MPC · JPL
675444	2015 XJ_{75}	—	January 1, 2009	Mount Lemmon	Mount Lemmon Survey	NYS	940 m	MPC · JPL
675445	2015 XU_{75}	—	December 3, 2015	Mount Lemmon	Mount Lemmon Survey	·	830 m	MPC · JPL
675446	2015 XR_{76}	—	September 4, 2008	Kitt Peak	Spacewatch	·	2.8 km	MPC · JPL
675447	2015 XU_{77}	—	September 29, 2011	Mount Lemmon	Mount Lemmon Survey	PHO	690 m	MPC · JPL
675448	2015 XK_{78}	—	June 3, 2008	Mount Lemmon	Mount Lemmon Survey	·	2.2 km	MPC · JPL
675449	2015 XC_{79}	—	March 13, 2013	Mount Lemmon	Mount Lemmon Survey	EUN	960 m	MPC · JPL
675450	2015 XL_{80}	—	November 9, 2015	Mount Lemmon	Mount Lemmon Survey	·	690 m	MPC · JPL
675451	2015 XN_{81}	—	September 14, 2009	Kitt Peak	Spacewatch	EOS	1.4 km	MPC · JPL
675452	2015 XH_{87}	—	November 10, 2009	Mount Lemmon	Mount Lemmon Survey	EOS	2.0 km	MPC · JPL
675453	2015 XR_{87}	—	February 12, 2000	Apache Point	SDSS Collaboration	·	3.8 km	MPC · JPL
675454	2015 XZ_{88}	—	October 30, 2011	Catalina	CSS	·	2.5 km	MPC · JPL
675455	2015 XO_{89}	—	December 4, 2015	Haleakala	Pan-STARRS 1	·	2.9 km	MPC · JPL
675456	2015 XF_{91}	—	August 20, 2014	Haleakala	Pan-STARRS 1	·	1.9 km	MPC · JPL
675457	2015 XJ_{92}	—	November 13, 2015	Mount Lemmon	Mount Lemmon Survey	·	1.2 km	MPC · JPL
675458	2015 XJ_{93}	—	September 18, 2003	Kitt Peak	Spacewatch	·	3.0 km	MPC · JPL
675459	2015 XY_{95}	—	October 22, 2009	Mount Lemmon	Mount Lemmon Survey	VER	2.2 km	MPC · JPL
675460	2015 XG_{98}	—	December 13, 2004	Kitt Peak	Spacewatch	·	870 m	MPC · JPL
675461	2015 XW_{99}	—	August 4, 2002	Palomar	NEAT	KON	1.7 km	MPC · JPL
675462	2015 XE_{100}	—	May 8, 2013	Haleakala	Pan-STARRS 1	EOS	1.6 km	MPC · JPL
675463	2015 XR_{101}	—	November 20, 2015	Kitt Peak	Spacewatch	·	560 m	MPC · JPL
675464	2015 XT_{102}	—	December 4, 2015	Haleakala	Pan-STARRS 1	·	1.7 km	MPC · JPL
675465	2015 XE_{103}	—	February 14, 2013	Mount Lemmon	Mount Lemmon Survey	·	1.1 km	MPC · JPL
675466	2015 XG_{103}	—	October 15, 2004	Mount Lemmon	Mount Lemmon Survey	·	1.2 km	MPC · JPL
675467	2015 XS_{104}	—	March 12, 2008	Mount Lemmon	Mount Lemmon Survey	·	1.8 km	MPC · JPL
675468	2015 XB_{106}	—	April 6, 2008	Kitt Peak	Spacewatch	·	1.6 km	MPC · JPL
675469	2015 XJ_{107}	—	May 14, 2008	Mount Lemmon	Mount Lemmon Survey	·	1.6 km	MPC · JPL
675470	2015 XE_{109}	—	January 17, 2013	Haleakala	Pan-STARRS 1	·	1.9 km	MPC · JPL
675471	2015 XC_{110}	—	December 1, 2015	Haleakala	Pan-STARRS 1	V	430 m	MPC · JPL
675472	2015 XY_{110}	—	September 2, 2014	Haleakala	Pan-STARRS 1	EOS	1.4 km	MPC · JPL
675473	2015 XJ_{111}	—	April 19, 2013	Haleakala	Pan-STARRS 1	·	1.4 km	MPC · JPL
675474	2015 XE_{112}	—	September 21, 2011	Mount Lemmon	Mount Lemmon Survey	·	700 m	MPC · JPL
675475	2015 XE_{113}	—	November 13, 2015	Mount Lemmon	Mount Lemmon Survey	·	2.7 km	MPC · JPL
675476	2015 XB_{115}	—	September 17, 2014	Haleakala	Pan-STARRS 1	·	2.5 km	MPC · JPL
675477	2015 XG_{117}	—	December 4, 2015	Haleakala	Pan-STARRS 1	·	850 m	MPC · JPL
675478	2015 XZ_{122}	—	December 21, 2006	Kitt Peak	L. H. Wasserman, M. W. Buie	·	2.6 km	MPC · JPL
675479	2015 XY_{123}	—	October 8, 2015	Haleakala	Pan-STARRS 1	JUN	1 km	MPC · JPL
675480	2015 XW_{126}	—	May 2, 2013	Kitt Peak	Spacewatch	·	2.3 km	MPC · JPL
675481	2015 XL_{128}	—	December 4, 2015	Catalina	CSS	T_{j} (2.97) · APO +1km	490 m	MPC · JPL
675482	2015 XH_{130}	—	September 19, 1998	Apache Point	SDSS	·	2.2 km	MPC · JPL
675483	2015 XV_{130}	—	December 14, 2010	Mount Lemmon	Mount Lemmon Survey	·	1.7 km	MPC · JPL
675484	2015 XZ_{130}	—	December 14, 2010	Mount Lemmon	Mount Lemmon Survey	EOS	1.9 km	MPC · JPL
675485	2015 XZ_{131}	—	November 2, 2015	Mount Lemmon	Mount Lemmon Survey	V	520 m	MPC · JPL
675486	2015 XU_{133}	—	September 21, 2008	Kitt Peak	Spacewatch	·	3.4 km	MPC · JPL
675487	2015 XS_{135}	—	December 3, 2010	Mount Lemmon	Mount Lemmon Survey	·	1.9 km	MPC · JPL
675488	2015 XY_{135}	—	August 27, 2011	Haleakala	Pan-STARRS 1	MAS	560 m	MPC · JPL
675489	2015 XS_{136}	—	June 30, 2014	Haleakala	Pan-STARRS 1	EOS	1.4 km	MPC · JPL
675490	2015 XX_{136}	—	September 23, 2015	Haleakala	Pan-STARRS 1	·	1.2 km	MPC · JPL
675491	2015 XG_{138}	—	February 20, 2006	Kitt Peak	Spacewatch	·	790 m	MPC · JPL
675492	2015 XE_{139}	—	September 20, 2011	Haleakala	Pan-STARRS 1	·	1.0 km	MPC · JPL
675493	2015 XY_{139}	—	December 4, 2015	Mount Lemmon	Mount Lemmon Survey	EOS	1.6 km	MPC · JPL
675494	2015 XF_{140}	—	June 2, 2014	Haleakala	Pan-STARRS 1	·	920 m	MPC · JPL
675495	2015 XW_{144}	—	November 21, 2005	Kitt Peak	Spacewatch	TRE	2.2 km	MPC · JPL
675496	2015 XX_{147}	—	December 4, 2015	Mount Lemmon	Mount Lemmon Survey	·	700 m	MPC · JPL
675497	2015 XW_{149}	—	August 29, 2009	Catalina	CSS	·	3.3 km	MPC · JPL
675498	2015 XL_{153}	—	November 11, 2004	Kitt Peak	Spacewatch	·	3.3 km	MPC · JPL
675499	2015 XL_{154}	—	November 1, 2015	Mount Lemmon	Mount Lemmon Survey	·	2.8 km	MPC · JPL
675500	2015 XM_{158}	—	November 10, 2010	Mount Lemmon	Mount Lemmon Survey	TIR	2.2 km	MPC · JPL

== 675501–675600 ==
back to top

Designation			Discovery			Properties		Ref
Permanent	Provisional	Named after	Date	Site	Discoverer(s)	Category	Diam.	Ref
675501	2015 XY_{159}	—	June 27, 2014	Haleakala	Pan-STARRS 1	·	3.2 km	MPC · JPL
675502	2015 XL_{160}	—	November 13, 2015	Catalina	CSS	·	1.5 km	MPC · JPL
675503	2015 XD_{164}	—	January 21, 2006	Kitt Peak	Spacewatch	URS	2.5 km	MPC · JPL
675504	2015 XQ_{164}	—	March 13, 2012	Mount Lemmon	Mount Lemmon Survey	ELF	3.4 km	MPC · JPL
675505	2015 XQ_{166}	—	June 4, 2013	Haleakala	Pan-STARRS 1	·	1.7 km	MPC · JPL
675506	2015 XK_{169}	—	January 22, 2012	Haleakala	Pan-STARRS 1	·	1.4 km	MPC · JPL
675507	2015 XN_{171}	—	November 6, 2009	Pla D'Arguines	R. Ferrando, Ferrando, M.	·	3.8 km	MPC · JPL
675508	2015 XX_{171}	—	November 22, 2015	Mount Lemmon	Mount Lemmon Survey	EOS	2.0 km	MPC · JPL
675509	2015 XF_{172}	—	May 21, 2014	Haleakala	Pan-STARRS 1	·	750 m	MPC · JPL
675510	2015 XP_{173}	—	January 10, 2013	Haleakala	Pan-STARRS 1	·	650 m	MPC · JPL
675511	2015 XF_{176}	—	January 18, 2013	Mount Lemmon	Mount Lemmon Survey	V	490 m	MPC · JPL
675512	2015 XM_{176}	—	November 13, 2015	Mount Lemmon	Mount Lemmon Survey	·	2.3 km	MPC · JPL
675513	2015 XW_{178}	—	December 6, 2011	Haleakala	Pan-STARRS 1	EOS	2.0 km	MPC · JPL
675514	2015 XD_{181}	—	March 16, 2012	Haleakala	Pan-STARRS 1	EOS	1.7 km	MPC · JPL
675515	2015 XB_{182}	—	October 24, 2009	Kitt Peak	Spacewatch	EOS	1.6 km	MPC · JPL
675516	2015 XE_{190}	—	October 23, 2011	Haleakala	Pan-STARRS 1	·	2.3 km	MPC · JPL
675517	2015 XS_{190}	—	September 24, 2011	Haleakala	Pan-STARRS 1	·	1.0 km	MPC · JPL
675518	2015 XA_{191}	—	June 7, 2013	Haleakala	Pan-STARRS 1	·	3.2 km	MPC · JPL
675519	2015 XW_{191}	—	February 14, 2013	ESA OGS	ESA OGS	·	2.4 km	MPC · JPL
675520	2015 XJ_{195}	—	March 25, 2012	Mount Lemmon	Mount Lemmon Survey	EOS	1.8 km	MPC · JPL
675521	2015 XK_{195}	—	February 2, 2006	Mount Lemmon	Mount Lemmon Survey	·	2.5 km	MPC · JPL
675522	2015 XU_{197}	—	December 6, 2015	Mount Lemmon	Mount Lemmon Survey	·	820 m	MPC · JPL
675523	2015 XC_{198}	—	June 4, 2014	Haleakala	Pan-STARRS 1	·	690 m	MPC · JPL
675524	2015 XY_{198}	—	October 29, 2005	Catalina	CSS	·	2.7 km	MPC · JPL
675525	2015 XU_{201}	—	November 18, 2008	Kitt Peak	Spacewatch	PHO	990 m	MPC · JPL
675526	2015 XO_{204}	—	February 28, 2008	Kitt Peak	Spacewatch	·	1.5 km	MPC · JPL
675527	2015 XR_{204}	—	December 25, 2010	Mount Lemmon	Mount Lemmon Survey	EOS	1.9 km	MPC · JPL
675528	2015 XD_{208}	—	September 29, 2009	Mount Lemmon	Mount Lemmon Survey	VER	2.7 km	MPC · JPL
675529	2015 XG_{216}	—	December 3, 2015	Mount Lemmon	Mount Lemmon Survey	·	1.8 km	MPC · JPL
675530	2015 XX_{217}	—	September 23, 2015	Haleakala	Pan-STARRS 1	EOS	1.8 km	MPC · JPL
675531	2015 XA_{219}	—	December 4, 2015	Mount Lemmon	Mount Lemmon Survey	·	530 m	MPC · JPL
675532	2015 XM_{220}	—	September 20, 2003	Kitt Peak	Spacewatch	·	2.4 km	MPC · JPL
675533	2015 XO_{221}	—	December 25, 2010	Mount Lemmon	Mount Lemmon Survey	EOS	1.8 km	MPC · JPL
675534	2015 XD_{222}	—	December 6, 2015	Mount Lemmon	Mount Lemmon Survey	EOS	1.5 km	MPC · JPL
675535	2015 XD_{224}	—	September 24, 2011	Mount Lemmon	Mount Lemmon Survey	NYS	740 m	MPC · JPL
675536	2015 XH_{225}	—	December 6, 2015	Haleakala	Pan-STARRS 1	V	450 m	MPC · JPL
675537	2015 XU_{231}	—	May 24, 2001	Apache Point	SDSS Collaboration	·	3.2 km	MPC · JPL
675538	2015 XN_{235}	—	December 13, 2010	Mount Lemmon	Mount Lemmon Survey	THM	1.8 km	MPC · JPL
675539	2015 XS_{236}	—	November 18, 2007	Kitt Peak	Spacewatch	·	930 m	MPC · JPL
675540	2015 XF_{238}	—	October 8, 2015	Mount Lemmon	Mount Lemmon Survey	·	840 m	MPC · JPL
675541	2015 XL_{239}	—	September 2, 2011	Haleakala	Pan-STARRS 1	·	650 m	MPC · JPL
675542	2015 XG_{240}	—	October 23, 2011	Mount Lemmon	Mount Lemmon Survey	·	890 m	MPC · JPL
675543	2015 XP_{241}	—	July 2, 2011	Mount Lemmon	Mount Lemmon Survey	NYS	660 m	MPC · JPL
675544	2015 XL_{242}	—	July 12, 2005	Mount Lemmon	Mount Lemmon Survey	·	580 m	MPC · JPL
675545	2015 XS_{242}	—	December 22, 2005	Kitt Peak	Spacewatch	·	1.6 km	MPC · JPL
675546	2015 XX_{243}	—	June 12, 2013	Haleakala	Pan-STARRS 1	EOS	1.6 km	MPC · JPL
675547	2015 XQ_{244}	—	August 10, 2007	Kitt Peak	Spacewatch	·	900 m	MPC · JPL
675548	2015 XP_{245}	—	March 13, 2005	Catalina	CSS	·	4.2 km	MPC · JPL
675549	2015 XJ_{248}	—	October 7, 2005	Mauna Kea	A. Boattini	·	3.3 km	MPC · JPL
675550	2015 XY_{248}	—	August 15, 2014	Haleakala	Pan-STARRS 1	·	2.9 km	MPC · JPL
675551	2015 XU_{250}	—	March 28, 2012	Catalina	CSS	·	2.7 km	MPC · JPL
675552	2015 XF_{253}	—	April 26, 2007	Mount Lemmon	Mount Lemmon Survey	·	3.4 km	MPC · JPL
675553	2015 XB_{257}	—	November 16, 2015	Haleakala	Pan-STARRS 1	·	960 m	MPC · JPL
675554	2015 XD_{257}	—	October 21, 2015	Haleakala	Pan-STARRS 1	·	1.0 km	MPC · JPL
675555	2015 XG_{258}	—	January 24, 2007	Mount Lemmon	Mount Lemmon Survey	AGN	1.2 km	MPC · JPL
675556	2015 XD_{262}	—	October 10, 2004	Kitt Peak	Spacewatch	·	3.2 km	MPC · JPL
675557	2015 XX_{265}	—	March 26, 2007	Mount Lemmon	Mount Lemmon Survey	·	1.8 km	MPC · JPL
675558	2015 XZ_{266}	—	June 3, 2014	Haleakala	Pan-STARRS 1	EOS	2.1 km	MPC · JPL
675559	2015 XU_{268}	—	June 4, 2013	Mount Lemmon	Mount Lemmon Survey	EOS	1.7 km	MPC · JPL
675560	2015 XS_{269}	—	November 22, 2015	Mount Lemmon	Mount Lemmon Survey	·	770 m	MPC · JPL
675561	2015 XN_{271}	—	December 6, 2015	Mount Lemmon	Mount Lemmon Survey	·	750 m	MPC · JPL
675562	2015 XY_{272}	—	November 10, 2015	Mount Lemmon	Mount Lemmon Survey	V	430 m	MPC · JPL
675563	2015 XN_{273}	—	December 13, 1999	Kitt Peak	Spacewatch	EOS	2.2 km	MPC · JPL
675564	2015 XD_{278}	—	February 28, 2008	Mount Lemmon	Mount Lemmon Survey	·	1.4 km	MPC · JPL
675565	2015 XU_{283}	—	February 26, 2009	Mount Lemmon	Mount Lemmon Survey	·	750 m	MPC · JPL
675566	2015 XU_{286}	—	November 22, 2015	Mount Lemmon	Mount Lemmon Survey	·	2.3 km	MPC · JPL
675567	2015 XW_{296}	—	November 22, 2015	Mount Lemmon	Mount Lemmon Survey	·	930 m	MPC · JPL
675568	2015 XD_{302}	—	August 21, 2015	Haleakala	Pan-STARRS 1	EUN	1.3 km	MPC · JPL
675569	2015 XU_{303}	—	October 21, 2011	Kitt Peak	Spacewatch	PHO	970 m	MPC · JPL
675570 Mircealițe	2015 XD_{307}	Mircealițe	December 2, 2015	La Palma	EURONEAR	·	970 m	MPC · JPL
675571	2015 XW_{307}	—	November 23, 2009	Catalina	CSS	TIR	2.8 km	MPC · JPL
675572	2015 XM_{308}	—	January 23, 2009	XuYi	PMO NEO Survey Program	ERI	1.2 km	MPC · JPL
675573	2015 XR_{309}	—	February 3, 2012	Mount Lemmon	Mount Lemmon Survey	AEO	950 m	MPC · JPL
675574	2015 XL_{310}	—	September 18, 2011	Mount Lemmon	Mount Lemmon Survey	·	680 m	MPC · JPL
675575	2015 XM_{310}	—	April 13, 2008	Mount Lemmon	Mount Lemmon Survey	·	2.2 km	MPC · JPL
675576	2015 XW_{310}	—	December 8, 2015	Mount Lemmon	Mount Lemmon Survey	·	2.4 km	MPC · JPL
675577	2015 XU_{311}	—	September 4, 2014	Haleakala	Pan-STARRS 1	·	3.2 km	MPC · JPL
675578	2015 XS_{312}	—	September 26, 2003	Apache Point	SDSS	ELF	3.4 km	MPC · JPL
675579	2015 XA_{313}	—	October 23, 2011	Mount Lemmon	Mount Lemmon Survey	·	780 m	MPC · JPL
675580	2015 XR_{313}	—	September 15, 2009	Kitt Peak	Spacewatch	·	2.4 km	MPC · JPL
675581	2015 XE_{314}	—	December 8, 2015	Mount Lemmon	Mount Lemmon Survey	V	520 m	MPC · JPL
675582	2015 XP_{314}	—	June 28, 2014	Haleakala	Pan-STARRS 1	·	2.6 km	MPC · JPL
675583	2015 XF_{315}	—	December 8, 2015	Mount Lemmon	Mount Lemmon Survey	·	2.7 km	MPC · JPL
675584	2015 XH_{315}	—	September 19, 2009	Mount Lemmon	Mount Lemmon Survey	·	2.0 km	MPC · JPL
675585	2015 XQ_{315}	—	September 28, 2011	Mount Lemmon	Mount Lemmon Survey	NYS	880 m	MPC · JPL
675586	2015 XO_{319}	—	September 23, 2011	Haleakala	Pan-STARRS 1	·	1.1 km	MPC · JPL
675587	2015 XX_{320}	—	December 18, 2004	Kitt Peak	Spacewatch	MAS	540 m	MPC · JPL
675588	2015 XZ_{320}	—	August 28, 2014	Haleakala	Pan-STARRS 1	EOS	1.8 km	MPC · JPL
675589	2015 XO_{323}	—	January 15, 2009	Kitt Peak	Spacewatch	NYS	910 m	MPC · JPL
675590	2015 XS_{326}	—	September 20, 2011	Kitt Peak	Spacewatch	NYS	820 m	MPC · JPL
675591	2015 XA_{329}	—	October 25, 2009	Pla D'Arguines	R. Ferrando, Ferrando, M.	VER	2.1 km	MPC · JPL
675592	2015 XR_{329}	—	June 3, 2014	Haleakala	Pan-STARRS 1	EOS	1.5 km	MPC · JPL
675593	2015 XE_{330}	—	September 30, 2011	Kitt Peak	Spacewatch	·	870 m	MPC · JPL
675594	2015 XH_{336}	—	September 19, 2014	Haleakala	Pan-STARRS 1	·	3.2 km	MPC · JPL
675595	2015 XN_{337}	—	November 3, 2004	Palomar	NEAT	·	2.9 km	MPC · JPL
675596	2015 XH_{344}	—	September 24, 2011	Haleakala	Pan-STARRS 1	·	1.1 km	MPC · JPL
675597	2015 XA_{345}	—	March 25, 2012	Kitt Peak	Spacewatch	THM	1.9 km	MPC · JPL
675598	2015 XW_{346}	—	September 28, 2011	Kitt Peak	Spacewatch	NYS	940 m	MPC · JPL
675599	2015 XG_{347}	—	February 22, 2012	Kitt Peak	Spacewatch	·	1.8 km	MPC · JPL
675600	2015 XL_{347}	—	October 12, 2010	Mount Lemmon	Mount Lemmon Survey	AGN	1.1 km	MPC · JPL

== 675601–675700 ==
back to top

Designation			Discovery			Properties		Ref
Permanent	Provisional	Named after	Date	Site	Discoverer(s)	Category	Diam.	Ref
675601	2015 XK_{348}	—	November 25, 2009	Kitt Peak	Spacewatch	·	3.2 km	MPC · JPL
675602	2015 XE_{351}	—	December 8, 2015	Haleakala	Pan-STARRS 1	·	1.1 km	MPC · JPL
675603	2015 XE_{352}	—	December 7, 2015	Haleakala	Pan-STARRS 1	APO · PHA	230 m	MPC · JPL
675604	2015 XT_{353}	—	December 9, 2015	Haleakala	Pan-STARRS 1	·	880 m	MPC · JPL
675605	2015 XV_{356}	—	September 12, 2015	Haleakala	Pan-STARRS 1	·	870 m	MPC · JPL
675606	2015 XD_{358}	—	September 17, 2009	Mount Lemmon	Mount Lemmon Survey	·	2.5 km	MPC · JPL
675607	2015 XU_{358}	—	November 14, 2010	Andrushivka	Kyrylenko, P., Y. Ivaščenko	·	2.1 km	MPC · JPL
675608	2015 XZ_{358}	—	November 2, 2015	Haleakala	Pan-STARRS 1	KON	1.8 km	MPC · JPL
675609	2015 XT_{360}	—	October 21, 2015	Haleakala	Pan-STARRS 1	TIR	2.4 km	MPC · JPL
675610	2015 XH_{362}	—	September 29, 2009	Mount Lemmon	Mount Lemmon Survey	·	2.8 km	MPC · JPL
675611	2015 XD_{363}	—	September 22, 2014	Haleakala	Pan-STARRS 1	·	3.0 km	MPC · JPL
675612	2015 XH_{365}	—	September 29, 2011	Mount Lemmon	Mount Lemmon Survey	·	970 m	MPC · JPL
675613	2015 XV_{366}	—	August 28, 2014	Haleakala	Pan-STARRS 1	·	2.9 km	MPC · JPL
675614	2015 XG_{368}	—	July 25, 2014	Haleakala	Pan-STARRS 1	·	3.2 km	MPC · JPL
675615	2015 XO_{368}	—	October 17, 2010	Mount Lemmon	Mount Lemmon Survey	·	1.7 km	MPC · JPL
675616	2015 XT_{368}	—	August 22, 2003	Palomar	NEAT	EOS	2.0 km	MPC · JPL
675617	2015 XS_{370}	—	December 12, 2015	Haleakala	Pan-STARRS 1	·	990 m	MPC · JPL
675618	2015 XX_{371}	—	December 10, 2004	Kitt Peak	Spacewatch	ERI	1.4 km	MPC · JPL
675619	2015 XD_{372}	—	September 23, 2011	Haleakala	Pan-STARRS 1	·	930 m	MPC · JPL
675620	2015 XF_{372}	—	August 22, 2014	Haleakala	Pan-STARRS 1	EOS	1.9 km	MPC · JPL
675621	2015 XS_{372}	—	October 29, 2006	Catalina	CSS	·	2.0 km	MPC · JPL
675622	2015 XY_{372}	—	August 23, 2011	Haleakala	Pan-STARRS 1	NYS	700 m	MPC · JPL
675623	2015 XP_{373}	—	January 25, 2009	Kitt Peak	Spacewatch	·	860 m	MPC · JPL
675624	2015 XE_{375}	—	July 8, 2013	Haleakala	Pan-STARRS 1	·	4.0 km	MPC · JPL
675625	2015 XC_{377}	—	December 6, 2015	Haleakala	Pan-STARRS 1	H	390 m	MPC · JPL
675626	2015 XV_{377}	—	June 1, 2014	Haleakala	Pan-STARRS 1	BAR	1.4 km	MPC · JPL
675627	2015 XG_{382}	—	September 20, 2014	Haleakala	Pan-STARRS 1	·	3.1 km	MPC · JPL
675628	2015 XP_{385}	—	December 9, 2015	Haleakala	Pan-STARRS 1	H	520 m	MPC · JPL
675629	2015 XR_{385}	—	December 9, 2015	Haleakala	Pan-STARRS 1	H	410 m	MPC · JPL
675630	2015 XA_{386}	—	February 8, 2008	Mount Lemmon	Mount Lemmon Survey	H	370 m	MPC · JPL
675631	2015 XT_{386}	—	December 4, 2015	Haleakala	Pan-STARRS 1	H	500 m	MPC · JPL
675632	2015 XF_{387}	—	December 7, 2015	Haleakala	Pan-STARRS 1	H	340 m	MPC · JPL
675633	2015 XB_{388}	—	December 4, 2015	Mount Lemmon	Mount Lemmon Survey	H	400 m	MPC · JPL
675634	2015 XH_{389}	—	December 13, 2015	Haleakala	Pan-STARRS 1	H	370 m	MPC · JPL
675635	2015 XT_{389}	—	December 5, 2015	Haleakala	Pan-STARRS 1	·	1.1 km	MPC · JPL
675636	2015 XF_{390}	—	September 19, 2014	Haleakala	Pan-STARRS 1	PHO	880 m	MPC · JPL
675637	2015 XK_{390}	—	December 7, 2015	Haleakala	Pan-STARRS 1	·	1.0 km	MPC · JPL
675638	2015 XJ_{393}	—	December 13, 2015	Haleakala	Pan-STARRS 1	MAR	750 m	MPC · JPL
675639	2015 XM_{393}	—	December 13, 2015	Haleakala	Pan-STARRS 1	·	1.3 km	MPC · JPL
675640	2015 XZ_{393}	—	December 13, 2015	Haleakala	Pan-STARRS 1	·	1.2 km	MPC · JPL
675641	2015 XG_{394}	—	September 29, 2003	Anderson Mesa	LONEOS	·	3.4 km	MPC · JPL
675642	2015 XN_{394}	—	March 8, 2005	Mount Lemmon	Mount Lemmon Survey	·	2.4 km	MPC · JPL
675643	2015 XB_{397}	—	December 21, 2008	Kitt Peak	Spacewatch	·	830 m	MPC · JPL
675644	2015 XL_{398}	—	December 9, 2015	Haleakala	Pan-STARRS 1	·	990 m	MPC · JPL
675645	2015 XU_{399}	—	January 12, 2010	Mount Lemmon	Mount Lemmon Survey	·	3.6 km	MPC · JPL
675646	2015 XV_{400}	—	December 7, 2015	Haleakala	Pan-STARRS 1	·	880 m	MPC · JPL
675647	2015 XW_{400}	—	October 20, 2011	Mount Lemmon	Mount Lemmon Survey	·	780 m	MPC · JPL
675648	2015 XY_{400}	—	December 9, 2015	Haleakala	Pan-STARRS 1	EOS	1.8 km	MPC · JPL
675649	2015 XF_{403}	—	October 12, 2009	Mount Lemmon	Mount Lemmon Survey	(43176)	2.4 km	MPC · JPL
675650	2015 XV_{403}	—	June 16, 2001	Kitt Peak	Spacewatch	·	3.0 km	MPC · JPL
675651	2015 XH_{405}	—	June 18, 2013	Haleakala	Pan-STARRS 1	·	3.2 km	MPC · JPL
675652	2015 XN_{405}	—	September 2, 2014	Haleakala	Pan-STARRS 1	·	2.0 km	MPC · JPL
675653	2015 XQ_{405}	—	December 3, 2015	Haleakala	Pan-STARRS 1	·	1.1 km	MPC · JPL
675654	2015 XZ_{405}	—	March 13, 2013	Mount Lemmon	Mount Lemmon Survey	·	860 m	MPC · JPL
675655	2015 XK_{408}	—	November 30, 2011	Mount Lemmon	Mount Lemmon Survey	·	1.3 km	MPC · JPL
675656	2015 XF_{409}	—	March 2, 2012	Catalina	CSS	·	1.4 km	MPC · JPL
675657	2015 XZ_{409}	—	February 3, 2012	Mount Lemmon	Mount Lemmon Survey	·	940 m	MPC · JPL
675658	2015 XJ_{410}	—	March 31, 2009	Kitt Peak	Spacewatch	·	1.1 km	MPC · JPL
675659	2015 XQ_{412}	—	December 25, 2010	Mount Lemmon	Mount Lemmon Survey	HNS	1 km	MPC · JPL
675660	2015 XV_{412}	—	December 8, 2015	Haleakala	Pan-STARRS 1	·	900 m	MPC · JPL
675661	2015 XZ_{415}	—	November 29, 2014	Mount Lemmon	Mount Lemmon Survey	·	3.4 km	MPC · JPL
675662	2015 XU_{416}	—	August 3, 2002	Palomar	NEAT	·	3.5 km	MPC · JPL
675663	2015 XO_{422}	—	December 7, 2015	Haleakala	Pan-STARRS 1	H	460 m	MPC · JPL
675664	2015 XC_{424}	—	December 4, 2015	Mount Lemmon	Mount Lemmon Survey	·	740 m	MPC · JPL
675665	2015 XB_{425}	—	December 12, 2015	Haleakala	Pan-STARRS 1	·	980 m	MPC · JPL
675666	2015 XP_{425}	—	December 12, 2015	Haleakala	Pan-STARRS 1	·	740 m	MPC · JPL
675667	2015 XN_{427}	—	August 14, 2015	Haleakala	Pan-STARRS 1	·	640 m	MPC · JPL
675668	2015 XT_{428}	—	December 2, 2015	Haleakala	Pan-STARRS 1	·	1.1 km	MPC · JPL
675669	2015 XK_{430}	—	January 31, 2017	Haleakala	Pan-STARRS 1	·	1.6 km	MPC · JPL
675670	2015 XM_{430}	—	December 6, 2015	Mount Lemmon	Mount Lemmon Survey	EUN	930 m	MPC · JPL
675671	2015 XZ_{437}	—	December 3, 2015	Haleakala	Pan-STARRS 1	·	920 m	MPC · JPL
675672	2015 XW_{439}	—	October 28, 2011	Catalina	CSS	·	1.2 km	MPC · JPL
675673	2015 XY_{443}	—	December 14, 2015	Haleakala	Pan-STARRS 1	·	1.1 km	MPC · JPL
675674	2015 XO_{444}	—	December 8, 2015	Haleakala	Pan-STARRS 1	·	1.5 km	MPC · JPL
675675	2015 XP_{444}	—	December 13, 2015	Haleakala	Pan-STARRS 1	·	920 m	MPC · JPL
675676	2015 XY_{445}	—	December 13, 2015	Haleakala	Pan-STARRS 1	·	1.0 km	MPC · JPL
675677	2015 XZ_{447}	—	December 14, 2015	Haleakala	Pan-STARRS 1	·	910 m	MPC · JPL
675678	2015 XK_{460}	—	December 6, 2015	Kitt Peak	Spacewatch	H	430 m	MPC · JPL
675679	2015 XL_{470}	—	December 7, 2015	Haleakala	Pan-STARRS 1	·	1.3 km	MPC · JPL
675680	2015 XY_{473}	—	December 8, 2015	Haleakala	Pan-STARRS 1	PHO	680 m	MPC · JPL
675681	2015 XW_{480}	—	December 3, 2015	Haleakala	Pan-STARRS 1	GEF	610 m	MPC · JPL
675682	2015 XQ_{481}	—	December 1, 2015	Haleakala	Pan-STARRS 1	·	2.6 km	MPC · JPL
675683	2015 YK_{1}	—	September 19, 2015	Haleakala	Pan-STARRS 1	H	410 m	MPC · JPL
675684	2015 YJ_{2}	—	December 25, 2005	Kitt Peak	Spacewatch	·	3.2 km	MPC · JPL
675685	2015 YA_{3}	—	September 13, 2004	Socorro	LINEAR	·	1.6 km	MPC · JPL
675686	2015 YN_{4}	—	December 16, 2015	Haleakala	Pan-STARRS 1	·	1.3 km	MPC · JPL
675687	2015 YB_{5}	—	July 22, 2003	Palomar	NEAT	·	3.2 km	MPC · JPL
675688	2015 YT_{5}	—	December 1, 2008	Kitt Peak	Spacewatch	·	1.1 km	MPC · JPL
675689	2015 YA_{10}	—	December 30, 2015	Mount Lemmon	Mount Lemmon Survey	APO	270 m	MPC · JPL
675690	2015 YD_{13}	—	March 12, 2008	Kitt Peak	Spacewatch	·	2.1 km	MPC · JPL
675691	2015 YO_{18}	—	January 31, 2009	Kitt Peak	Spacewatch	·	860 m	MPC · JPL
675692	2015 YE_{20}	—	October 26, 2011	Haleakala	Pan-STARRS 1	·	1.0 km	MPC · JPL
675693	2015 YP_{21}	—	June 18, 2014	Mount Lemmon	Mount Lemmon Survey	H	380 m	MPC · JPL
675694	2015 YQ_{21}	—	December 18, 2015	Haleakala	Pan-STARRS 1	H	400 m	MPC · JPL
675695	2015 YS_{23}	—	October 24, 2009	Kitt Peak	Spacewatch	·	3.0 km	MPC · JPL
675696	2015 YS_{26}	—	December 19, 2015	Mount Lemmon	Mount Lemmon Survey	·	1.0 km	MPC · JPL
675697	2015 YA_{28}	—	August 28, 2014	Haleakala	Pan-STARRS 1	·	1.2 km	MPC · JPL
675698	2015 YM_{28}	—	January 2, 2016	Haleakala	Pan-STARRS 1	H	380 m	MPC · JPL
675699	2015 YO_{32}	—	December 18, 2015	Mount Lemmon	Mount Lemmon Survey	·	760 m	MPC · JPL
675700	2015 YE_{36}	—	November 10, 2013	Mount Lemmon	Mount Lemmon Survey	L5	7.0 km	MPC · JPL

== 675701–675800 ==
back to top

Designation			Discovery			Properties		Ref
Permanent	Provisional	Named after	Date	Site	Discoverer(s)	Category	Diam.	Ref
675701	2016 AS_{2}	—	September 24, 2009	Mount Lemmon	Mount Lemmon Survey	·	2.5 km	MPC · JPL
675702	2016 AA_{3}	—	March 12, 2010	Mount Lemmon	Mount Lemmon Survey	·	760 m	MPC · JPL
675703	2016 AO_{3}	—	October 30, 2008	Mount Lemmon	Mount Lemmon Survey	·	1.0 km	MPC · JPL
675704	2016 AQ_{5}	—	April 21, 2012	Mount Lemmon	Mount Lemmon Survey	·	2.9 km	MPC · JPL
675705	2016 AV_{7}	—	December 14, 2010	Mount Lemmon	Mount Lemmon Survey	ARM	3.8 km	MPC · JPL
675706	2016 AS_{8}	—	October 28, 2015	Haleakala	Pan-STARRS 1	H	500 m	MPC · JPL
675707	2016 AK_{10}	—	March 4, 2008	Mount Lemmon	Mount Lemmon Survey	·	1.3 km	MPC · JPL
675708	2016 AC_{11}	—	November 14, 2015	Mount Lemmon	Mount Lemmon Survey	V	530 m	MPC · JPL
675709	2016 AJ_{14}	—	September 28, 2005	Palomar	NEAT	·	580 m	MPC · JPL
675710	2016 AJ_{16}	—	January 3, 2016	Mount Lemmon	Mount Lemmon Survey	·	1.2 km	MPC · JPL
675711	2016 AR_{17}	—	November 1, 2010	Mount Lemmon	Mount Lemmon Survey	·	1.3 km	MPC · JPL
675712	2016 AC_{21}	—	November 18, 2003	Kitt Peak	Spacewatch	·	3.2 km	MPC · JPL
675713	2016 AH_{22}	—	June 12, 2008	Kitt Peak	Spacewatch	·	2.7 km	MPC · JPL
675714	2016 AR_{22}	—	January 3, 2016	Haleakala	Pan-STARRS 1	L5	7.2 km	MPC · JPL
675715	2016 AM_{26}	—	March 22, 2001	Kitt Peak	Spacewatch	·	1.1 km	MPC · JPL
675716	2016 AW_{26}	—	January 3, 2016	Mount Lemmon	Mount Lemmon Survey	NYS	930 m	MPC · JPL
675717	2016 AJ_{27}	—	March 31, 2009	Kitt Peak	Spacewatch	·	900 m	MPC · JPL
675718	2016 AW_{28}	—	January 3, 2016	Haleakala	Pan-STARRS 1	L5	9.4 km	MPC · JPL
675719	2016 AO_{29}	—	December 30, 2015	Mount Lemmon	Mount Lemmon Survey	·	1.1 km	MPC · JPL
675720	2016 AN_{34}	—	October 8, 2008	Mount Lemmon	Mount Lemmon Survey	·	3.7 km	MPC · JPL
675721	2016 AZ_{34}	—	April 7, 2013	Kitt Peak	Spacewatch	·	1.3 km	MPC · JPL
675722	2016 AA_{36}	—	December 19, 2015	Mount Lemmon	Mount Lemmon Survey	·	800 m	MPC · JPL
675723	2016 AY_{36}	—	December 6, 2015	Mount Lemmon	Mount Lemmon Survey	·	2.4 km	MPC · JPL
675724	2016 AC_{40}	—	November 21, 2009	Catalina	CSS	·	3.3 km	MPC · JPL
675725	2016 AO_{40}	—	February 13, 2011	Mount Lemmon	Mount Lemmon Survey	·	2.9 km	MPC · JPL
675726	2016 AB_{41}	—	January 26, 2011	Mount Lemmon	Mount Lemmon Survey	·	2.9 km	MPC · JPL
675727	2016 AA_{43}	—	January 4, 2016	Haleakala	Pan-STARRS 1	·	860 m	MPC · JPL
675728	2016 AQ_{43}	—	October 26, 2009	Mount Lemmon	Mount Lemmon Survey	·	2.0 km	MPC · JPL
675729	2016 AQ_{46}	—	September 15, 2007	Mount Lemmon	Mount Lemmon Survey	MAS	590 m	MPC · JPL
675730	2016 AA_{58}	—	January 4, 2016	Haleakala	Pan-STARRS 1	·	990 m	MPC · JPL
675731	2016 AU_{58}	—	November 10, 2005	Mount Lemmon	Mount Lemmon Survey	·	560 m	MPC · JPL
675732	2016 AK_{59}	—	December 3, 2015	Mount Lemmon	Mount Lemmon Survey	V	640 m	MPC · JPL
675733	2016 AJ_{60}	—	November 27, 2011	Kitt Peak	Spacewatch	·	1.0 km	MPC · JPL
675734	2016 AD_{61}	—	May 16, 2013	Haleakala	Pan-STARRS 1	·	910 m	MPC · JPL
675735	2016 AM_{62}	—	September 27, 2014	Mount Lemmon	Mount Lemmon Survey	·	1.3 km	MPC · JPL
675736	2016 AT_{62}	—	December 6, 2015	Mount Lemmon	Mount Lemmon Survey	·	1.4 km	MPC · JPL
675737	2016 AK_{65}	—	January 3, 2016	Haleakala	Pan-STARRS 1	·	1.2 km	MPC · JPL
675738	2016 AU_{68}	—	October 26, 2011	Haleakala	Pan-STARRS 1	·	840 m	MPC · JPL
675739	2016 AR_{73}	—	June 4, 2014	Mount Lemmon	Mount Lemmon Survey	·	980 m	MPC · JPL
675740	2016 AB_{81}	—	June 15, 2004	Kitt Peak	Spacewatch	·	890 m	MPC · JPL
675741	2016 AD_{81}	—	December 16, 2007	Kitt Peak	Spacewatch	·	1.3 km	MPC · JPL
675742	2016 AQ_{81}	—	February 6, 2002	Kitt Peak	Deep Ecliptic Survey	ERI	1.3 km	MPC · JPL
675743	2016 AA_{82}	—	June 24, 2014	Haleakala	Pan-STARRS 1	HNS	1.2 km	MPC · JPL
675744	2016 AC_{82}	—	January 14, 2011	Mount Lemmon	Mount Lemmon Survey	VER	2.7 km	MPC · JPL
675745	2016 AB_{83}	—	December 9, 2015	Bergisch Gladbach	W. Bickel	V	560 m	MPC · JPL
675746	2016 AL_{84}	—	October 24, 2011	Haleakala	Pan-STARRS 1	·	1.1 km	MPC · JPL
675747	2016 AO_{84}	—	September 23, 2015	Haleakala	Pan-STARRS 1	·	1.1 km	MPC · JPL
675748	2016 AZ_{84}	—	February 1, 2009	Kitt Peak	Spacewatch	MAS	530 m	MPC · JPL
675749	2016 AT_{85}	—	December 8, 2015	Haleakala	Pan-STARRS 1	·	1.3 km	MPC · JPL
675750	2016 AX_{85}	—	December 4, 2015	Mount Lemmon	Mount Lemmon Survey	·	2.9 km	MPC · JPL
675751	2016 AD_{86}	—	November 13, 2005	Kitt Peak	Spacewatch	V	710 m	MPC · JPL
675752	2016 AF_{86}	—	March 15, 2013	Kitt Peak	Spacewatch	·	960 m	MPC · JPL
675753	2016 AL_{87}	—	December 9, 2015	Haleakala	Pan-STARRS 1	V	510 m	MPC · JPL
675754	2016 AY_{92}	—	April 3, 2008	Catalina	CSS	·	1.9 km	MPC · JPL
675755	2016 AJ_{93}	—	March 20, 2010	WISE	WISE	VER	2.5 km	MPC · JPL
675756	2016 AM_{94}	—	January 30, 2008	Mount Lemmon	Mount Lemmon Survey	·	1.1 km	MPC · JPL
675757	2016 AK_{96}	—	February 10, 1999	Kitt Peak	Spacewatch	V	670 m	MPC · JPL
675758	2016 AS_{97}	—	January 7, 2016	Haleakala	Pan-STARRS 1	·	910 m	MPC · JPL
675759	2016 AE_{100}	—	January 12, 2008	Kitt Peak	Spacewatch	H	310 m	MPC · JPL
675760	2016 AD_{101}	—	March 10, 2011	Mayhill	Falla, N.	·	2.8 km	MPC · JPL
675761	2016 AS_{101}	—	January 26, 2012	Haleakala	Pan-STARRS 1	·	550 m	MPC · JPL
675762	2016 AG_{104}	—	October 30, 2007	Mount Lemmon	Mount Lemmon Survey	·	1.1 km	MPC · JPL
675763	2016 AL_{104}	—	September 24, 2008	Mount Lemmon	Mount Lemmon Survey	·	3.1 km	MPC · JPL
675764	2016 AU_{104}	—	January 19, 2012	Kitt Peak	Spacewatch	HNS	1.4 km	MPC · JPL
675765	2016 AR_{105}	—	July 14, 2013	Haleakala	Pan-STARRS 1	EOS	2.1 km	MPC · JPL
675766	2016 AM_{106}	—	January 1, 2012	Mount Lemmon	Mount Lemmon Survey	·	930 m	MPC · JPL
675767	2016 AD_{107}	—	October 31, 2005	Mauna Kea	A. Boattini	·	880 m	MPC · JPL
675768	2016 AF_{107}	—	January 7, 2016	Haleakala	Pan-STARRS 1	H	470 m	MPC · JPL
675769	2016 AD_{110}	—	June 13, 2012	Haleakala	Pan-STARRS 1	·	2.0 km	MPC · JPL
675770	2016 AH_{110}	—	October 18, 2003	Kitt Peak	Spacewatch	MAS	690 m	MPC · JPL
675771	2016 AJ_{113}	—	October 21, 2011	Mount Lemmon	Mount Lemmon Survey	·	1.1 km	MPC · JPL
675772	2016 AK_{114}	—	November 21, 2009	Mount Lemmon	Mount Lemmon Survey	·	3.1 km	MPC · JPL
675773	2016 AS_{114}	—	January 7, 2016	Haleakala	Pan-STARRS 1	·	980 m	MPC · JPL
675774	2016 AJ_{115}	—	January 19, 2012	Haleakala	Pan-STARRS 1	·	810 m	MPC · JPL
675775	2016 AM_{115}	—	November 9, 2007	Kitt Peak	Spacewatch	·	840 m	MPC · JPL
675776	2016 AV_{115}	—	March 10, 2005	Moletai	K. Černis, Zdanavicius, J.	·	3.9 km	MPC · JPL
675777	2016 AD_{117}	—	April 26, 2003	Apache Point	SDSS Collaboration	H	400 m	MPC · JPL
675778	2016 AH_{117}	—	January 8, 2011	Mount Lemmon	Mount Lemmon Survey	EOS	2.1 km	MPC · JPL
675779	2016 AY_{119}	—	January 3, 2016	Mount Lemmon	Mount Lemmon Survey	·	1.0 km	MPC · JPL
675780	2016 AK_{121}	—	March 15, 2012	Catalina	CSS	HNS	1.2 km	MPC · JPL
675781	2016 AQ_{121}	—	February 9, 2008	Mount Lemmon	Mount Lemmon Survey	·	700 m	MPC · JPL
675782	2016 AY_{123}	—	June 15, 2007	Kitt Peak	Spacewatch	·	3.4 km	MPC · JPL
675783	2016 AK_{124}	—	January 8, 2016	Haleakala	Pan-STARRS 1	·	910 m	MPC · JPL
675784	2016 AA_{127}	—	April 13, 2011	Haleakala	Pan-STARRS 1	·	3.5 km	MPC · JPL
675785	2016 AL_{128}	—	October 16, 2006	Kitt Peak	Spacewatch	H	400 m	MPC · JPL
675786	2016 AG_{129}	—	November 2, 2008	Mount Lemmon	Mount Lemmon Survey	·	2.9 km	MPC · JPL
675787	2016 AS_{129}	—	November 21, 2014	Haleakala	Pan-STARRS 1	·	2.9 km	MPC · JPL
675788	2016 AQ_{130}	—	August 5, 2004	Palomar	NEAT	H	730 m	MPC · JPL
675789	2016 AN_{134}	—	September 23, 2015	Haleakala	Pan-STARRS 1	·	2.9 km	MPC · JPL
675790	2016 AQ_{134}	—	March 25, 2012	Catalina	CSS	BRA	1.9 km	MPC · JPL
675791	2016 AT_{135}	—	October 23, 2003	Kitt Peak	Spacewatch	·	2.9 km	MPC · JPL
675792	2016 AU_{135}	—	September 6, 2008	Mount Lemmon	Mount Lemmon Survey	·	3.0 km	MPC · JPL
675793	2016 AA_{136}	—	November 7, 2007	Mount Lemmon	Mount Lemmon Survey	·	1.1 km	MPC · JPL
675794	2016 AL_{143}	—	January 9, 2016	Haleakala	Pan-STARRS 1	JUN	650 m	MPC · JPL
675795	2016 AP_{145}	—	September 11, 2010	Catalina	CSS	·	1.1 km	MPC · JPL
675796	2016 AR_{145}	—	August 3, 2014	Haleakala	Pan-STARRS 1	·	1.4 km	MPC · JPL
675797	2016 AX_{147}	—	January 10, 2016	Space Surveillance	Space Surveillance Telescope	AMO +1km	1.1 km	MPC · JPL
675798	2016 AA_{148}	—	November 19, 2004	Catalina	CSS	·	1.0 km	MPC · JPL
675799	2016 AH_{148}	—	September 9, 2008	Mount Lemmon	Mount Lemmon Survey	(43176)	2.8 km	MPC · JPL
675800	2016 AK_{148}	—	August 24, 2008	Kitt Peak	Spacewatch	·	2.6 km	MPC · JPL

== 675801–675900 ==
back to top

Designation			Discovery			Properties		Ref
Permanent	Provisional	Named after	Date	Site	Discoverer(s)	Category	Diam.	Ref
675801	2016 AA_{149}	—	November 24, 2009	Kitt Peak	Spacewatch	EOS	1.9 km	MPC · JPL
675802	2016 AT_{149}	—	April 4, 2005	Catalina	CSS	·	2.9 km	MPC · JPL
675803	2016 AX_{162}	—	January 11, 2016	Haleakala	Pan-STARRS 1	H	330 m	MPC · JPL
675804	2016 AT_{164}	—	August 22, 2014	Haleakala	Pan-STARRS 1	·	1.3 km	MPC · JPL
675805	2016 AA_{168}	—	September 25, 2005	Kitt Peak	Spacewatch	·	1.7 km	MPC · JPL
675806	2016 AN_{169}	—	June 3, 2014	Haleakala	Pan-STARRS 1	·	830 m	MPC · JPL
675807	2016 AR_{171}	—	December 15, 2007	Mount Lemmon	Mount Lemmon Survey	MAS	730 m	MPC · JPL
675808	2016 AT_{174}	—	March 14, 2012	Catalina	CSS	(5)	990 m	MPC · JPL
675809	2016 AK_{177}	—	November 21, 2014	Mount Lemmon	Mount Lemmon Survey	·	2.3 km	MPC · JPL
675810	2016 AX_{178}	—	May 8, 2006	Mount Lemmon	Mount Lemmon Survey	·	3.3 km	MPC · JPL
675811	2016 AN_{180}	—	December 13, 2015	Haleakala	Pan-STARRS 1	H	430 m	MPC · JPL
675812	2016 AP_{181}	—	June 1, 2014	Haleakala	Pan-STARRS 1	H	490 m	MPC · JPL
675813	2016 AD_{182}	—	December 13, 2015	Haleakala	Pan-STARRS 1	H	380 m	MPC · JPL
675814	2016 AF_{182}	—	January 8, 2016	Haleakala	Pan-STARRS 1	·	1.1 km	MPC · JPL
675815	2016 AS_{182}	—	December 10, 2014	Mount Lemmon	Mount Lemmon Survey	·	2.8 km	MPC · JPL
675816	2016 AZ_{183}	—	January 11, 2016	Haleakala	Pan-STARRS 1	EUN	920 m	MPC · JPL
675817	2016 AH_{184}	—	December 9, 2015	Haleakala	Pan-STARRS 1	MAR	930 m	MPC · JPL
675818	2016 AM_{184}	—	December 4, 2015	Haleakala	Pan-STARRS 1	H	400 m	MPC · JPL
675819	2016 AN_{184}	—	January 18, 2009	Mount Lemmon	Mount Lemmon Survey	·	1.2 km	MPC · JPL
675820	2016 AQ_{184}	—	November 6, 2015	Mount Lemmon	Mount Lemmon Survey	(5)	990 m	MPC · JPL
675821	2016 AD_{185}	—	March 3, 2008	Mount Lemmon	Mount Lemmon Survey	·	760 m	MPC · JPL
675822	2016 AV_{186}	—	September 26, 2011	Haleakala	Pan-STARRS 1	·	960 m	MPC · JPL
675823	2016 AZ_{189}	—	January 20, 2008	Kitt Peak	Spacewatch	·	760 m	MPC · JPL
675824	2016 AQ_{192}	—	September 19, 1998	Apache Point	SDSS	EOS	1.9 km	MPC · JPL
675825	2016 AF_{194}	—	September 14, 2014	Haleakala	Pan-STARRS 1	URS	3.1 km	MPC · JPL
675826	2016 AW_{194}	—	August 20, 2014	Haleakala	Pan-STARRS 1	H	360 m	MPC · JPL
675827	2016 AY_{194}	—	August 20, 2014	Haleakala	Pan-STARRS 1	H	530 m	MPC · JPL
675828	2016 AP_{195}	—	January 15, 2016	Mount Lemmon	Mount Lemmon Survey	H	400 m	MPC · JPL
675829	2016 AZ_{196}	—	January 4, 2016	Haleakala	Pan-STARRS 1	H	370 m	MPC · JPL
675830	2016 AR_{197}	—	January 12, 2016	Haleakala	Pan-STARRS 1	H	450 m	MPC · JPL
675831	2016 AF_{199}	—	January 9, 2016	Haleakala	Pan-STARRS 1	H	350 m	MPC · JPL
675832	2016 AJ_{199}	—	January 11, 2016	Haleakala	Pan-STARRS 1	H	370 m	MPC · JPL
675833	2016 AM_{200}	—	January 1, 2016	Haleakala	Pan-STARRS 1	·	1.3 km	MPC · JPL
675834	2016 AD_{202}	—	January 3, 2016	Haleakala	Pan-STARRS 1	·	1.2 km	MPC · JPL
675835	2016 AS_{203}	—	January 3, 2016	Haleakala	Pan-STARRS 1	EUN	720 m	MPC · JPL
675836	2016 AV_{203}	—	January 3, 2016	Haleakala	Pan-STARRS 1	·	930 m	MPC · JPL
675837	2016 AX_{205}	—	January 4, 2016	Haleakala	Pan-STARRS 1	·	930 m	MPC · JPL
675838	2016 AL_{206}	—	April 21, 2009	Kitt Peak	Spacewatch	MAS	520 m	MPC · JPL
675839	2016 AQ_{206}	—	January 7, 2016	ESA OGS	ESA OGS	·	990 m	MPC · JPL
675840	2016 AB_{207}	—	January 7, 2016	Haleakala	Pan-STARRS 1	·	1.3 km	MPC · JPL
675841	2016 AK_{211}	—	December 13, 2015	Haleakala	Pan-STARRS 1	HNS	900 m	MPC · JPL
675842	2016 AG_{213}	—	January 14, 2016	Haleakala	Pan-STARRS 1	EUN	900 m	MPC · JPL
675843	2016 AN_{213}	—	January 14, 2016	Mount Lemmon	Mount Lemmon Survey	HNS	1.1 km	MPC · JPL
675844	2016 AD_{215}	—	January 15, 2016	Mount Lemmon	Mount Lemmon Survey	·	1.0 km	MPC · JPL
675845	2016 AJ_{216}	—	September 20, 2008	Mount Lemmon	Mount Lemmon Survey	·	2.4 km	MPC · JPL
675846	2016 AU_{216}	—	November 18, 2011	Mount Lemmon	Mount Lemmon Survey	·	830 m	MPC · JPL
675847	2016 AC_{218}	—	November 17, 2014	Haleakala	Pan-STARRS 1	·	2.1 km	MPC · JPL
675848	2016 AF_{220}	—	October 31, 2008	Mount Lemmon	Mount Lemmon Survey	·	3.3 km	MPC · JPL
675849	2016 AR_{221}	—	October 15, 2010	Mayhill-ISON	L. Elenin	·	1.4 km	MPC · JPL
675850	2016 AU_{221}	—	January 8, 2016	Haleakala	Pan-STARRS 1	·	840 m	MPC · JPL
675851	2016 AZ_{223}	—	January 15, 2010	Mount Lemmon	Mount Lemmon Survey	·	4.2 km	MPC · JPL
675852	2016 AJ_{224}	—	September 4, 2007	Mount Lemmon	Mount Lemmon Survey	·	2.6 km	MPC · JPL
675853	2016 AR_{224}	—	February 7, 2010	Mount Lemmon	Mount Lemmon Survey	·	3.9 km	MPC · JPL
675854	2016 AJ_{231}	—	January 2, 2012	Mount Lemmon	Mount Lemmon Survey	·	1.1 km	MPC · JPL
675855	2016 AX_{236}	—	November 20, 2009	Kitt Peak	Spacewatch	·	2.7 km	MPC · JPL
675856	2016 AM_{243}	—	January 3, 2012	Mount Lemmon	Mount Lemmon Survey	·	850 m	MPC · JPL
675857	2016 AM_{245}	—	January 30, 2012	Mount Lemmon	Mount Lemmon Survey	KON	2.0 km	MPC · JPL
675858	2016 AL_{252}	—	October 2, 2014	Haleakala	Pan-STARRS 1	·	1.1 km	MPC · JPL
675859	2016 AU_{252}	—	January 4, 2016	Haleakala	Pan-STARRS 1	KON	1.6 km	MPC · JPL
675860	2016 AV_{252}	—	November 5, 2010	Mount Lemmon	Mount Lemmon Survey	·	1.0 km	MPC · JPL
675861	2016 AB_{254}	—	September 11, 2010	Mount Lemmon	Mount Lemmon Survey	·	1.2 km	MPC · JPL
675862	2016 AR_{258}	—	January 8, 2016	Haleakala	Pan-STARRS 1	·	860 m	MPC · JPL
675863	2016 AM_{260}	—	February 2, 2008	Kitt Peak	Spacewatch	MAR	900 m	MPC · JPL
675864	2016 AQ_{260}	—	April 4, 2005	Mount Lemmon	Mount Lemmon Survey	MAS	610 m	MPC · JPL
675865	2016 AQ_{261}	—	November 22, 2014	Mount Lemmon	Mount Lemmon Survey	·	1.1 km	MPC · JPL
675866	2016 AN_{262}	—	March 16, 2012	Haleakala	Pan-STARRS 1	·	950 m	MPC · JPL
675867	2016 AH_{263}	—	January 8, 2016	Haleakala	Pan-STARRS 1	·	3.5 km	MPC · JPL
675868	2016 AH_{265}	—	January 11, 2010	Mount Lemmon	Mount Lemmon Survey	·	2.8 km	MPC · JPL
675869	2016 AX_{265}	—	November 16, 2009	Mount Lemmon	Mount Lemmon Survey	·	2.3 km	MPC · JPL
675870	2016 AD_{266}	—	August 30, 2014	Mount Lemmon	Mount Lemmon Survey	·	1.0 km	MPC · JPL
675871	2016 AH_{266}	—	January 9, 2016	Haleakala	Pan-STARRS 1	EUN	1.0 km	MPC · JPL
675872	2016 AK_{266}	—	November 25, 2014	Haleakala	Pan-STARRS 1	·	1.7 km	MPC · JPL
675873	2016 AG_{267}	—	August 28, 2014	Haleakala	Pan-STARRS 1	·	840 m	MPC · JPL
675874	2016 AW_{267}	—	July 18, 2013	Haleakala	Pan-STARRS 1	MAR	780 m	MPC · JPL
675875	2016 AZ_{275}	—	December 31, 2007	Kitt Peak	Spacewatch	·	1.0 km	MPC · JPL
675876	2016 AH_{278}	—	January 7, 2016	Haleakala	Pan-STARRS 1	·	1.0 km	MPC · JPL
675877	2016 AQ_{278}	—	April 8, 2010	Kitt Peak	Spacewatch	3:2	4.6 km	MPC · JPL
675878	2016 AU_{279}	—	January 14, 2016	Haleakala	Pan-STARRS 1	·	1.3 km	MPC · JPL
675879	2016 AZ_{282}	—	January 4, 2016	Haleakala	Pan-STARRS 1	·	860 m	MPC · JPL
675880	2016 AX_{284}	—	January 8, 2016	Haleakala	Pan-STARRS 1	·	1.3 km	MPC · JPL
675881	2016 AK_{286}	—	January 8, 2016	Haleakala	Pan-STARRS 1	HNS	1.1 km	MPC · JPL
675882	2016 AE_{287}	—	January 3, 2016	Haleakala	Pan-STARRS 1	·	820 m	MPC · JPL
675883	2016 AY_{289}	—	January 13, 2008	Kitt Peak	Spacewatch	·	670 m	MPC · JPL
675884	2016 AQ_{291}	—	January 11, 2016	Haleakala	Pan-STARRS 1	H	390 m	MPC · JPL
675885	2016 AT_{293}	—	January 14, 2016	Haleakala	Pan-STARRS 1	·	1 km	MPC · JPL
675886	2016 AZ_{294}	—	January 8, 2016	Haleakala	Pan-STARRS 1	3:2	3.7 km	MPC · JPL
675887	2016 AV_{298}	—	January 14, 2016	Haleakala	Pan-STARRS 1	HNS	660 m	MPC · JPL
675888	2016 AL_{301}	—	January 9, 2016	Haleakala	Pan-STARRS 1	·	890 m	MPC · JPL
675889	2016 AH_{304}	—	January 8, 2016	Haleakala	Pan-STARRS 1	·	830 m	MPC · JPL
675890	2016 AE_{310}	—	January 8, 2016	Haleakala	Pan-STARRS 1	MAR	700 m	MPC · JPL
675891	2016 AM_{315}	—	January 11, 2016	Haleakala	Pan-STARRS 1	·	1.7 km	MPC · JPL
675892	2016 AA_{328}	—	January 3, 2016	MARGO, Nauchnyi	G. Borisov	H	430 m	MPC · JPL
675893	2016 AJ_{341}	—	January 14, 2016	Haleakala	Pan-STARRS 1	·	1.3 km	MPC · JPL
675894	2016 AL_{344}	—	January 5, 2016	Haleakala	Pan-STARRS 1	L5	8.3 km	MPC · JPL
675895	2016 AX_{347}	—	January 7, 2016	Haleakala	Pan-STARRS 1	·	610 m	MPC · JPL
675896	2016 AZ_{356}	—	January 1, 2016	Haleakala	Pan-STARRS 1	·	1.2 km	MPC · JPL
675897	2016 AJ_{370}	—	January 9, 2016	Haleakala	Pan-STARRS 1	EUN	890 m	MPC · JPL
675898	2016 BH_{3}	—	January 2, 2016	Haleakala	Pan-STARRS 1	·	1.0 km	MPC · JPL
675899	2016 BG_{4}	—	December 13, 2010	Mauna Kea	M. Micheli, L. Wells	BRA	1.5 km	MPC · JPL
675900	2016 BT_{6}	—	January 8, 2016	Haleakala	Pan-STARRS 1	BAR	1.1 km	MPC · JPL

== 675901–676000 ==
back to top

Designation			Discovery			Properties		Ref
Permanent	Provisional	Named after	Date	Site	Discoverer(s)	Category	Diam.	Ref
675901	2016 BU_{6}	—	December 19, 2009	Kitt Peak	Spacewatch	EOS	2.1 km	MPC · JPL
675902	2016 BB_{7}	—	October 7, 2014	Haleakala	Pan-STARRS 1	MAR	910 m	MPC · JPL
675903	2016 BC_{9}	—	April 27, 2008	Kitt Peak	Spacewatch	·	810 m	MPC · JPL
675904	2016 BQ_{10}	—	January 18, 2016	Haleakala	Pan-STARRS 1	·	860 m	MPC · JPL
675905	2016 BG_{11}	—	January 8, 2016	Haleakala	Pan-STARRS 1	·	1 km	MPC · JPL
675906	2016 BG_{13}	—	November 5, 2007	Kitt Peak	Spacewatch	·	850 m	MPC · JPL
675907	2016 BT_{15}	—	November 4, 2007	Kitt Peak	Spacewatch	MAS	610 m	MPC · JPL
675908	2016 BN_{16}	—	January 3, 2016	Haleakala	Pan-STARRS 1	MAS	610 m	MPC · JPL
675909	2016 BA_{21}	—	August 24, 2012	Charleston	R. Holmes	H	440 m	MPC · JPL
675910	2016 BF_{21}	—	January 27, 2012	Mount Lemmon	Mount Lemmon Survey	·	650 m	MPC · JPL
675911	2016 BR_{23}	—	September 5, 2008	Kitt Peak	Spacewatch	EOS	2.3 km	MPC · JPL
675912	2016 BW_{23}	—	February 9, 2005	Mount Lemmon	Mount Lemmon Survey	·	2.8 km	MPC · JPL
675913	2016 BU_{26}	—	September 9, 2008	Mount Lemmon	Mount Lemmon Survey	EOS	2.0 km	MPC · JPL
675914	2016 BL_{27}	—	January 14, 2016	Haleakala	Pan-STARRS 1	·	850 m	MPC · JPL
675915	2016 BO_{28}	—	December 14, 2010	Mount Lemmon	Mount Lemmon Survey	H	400 m	MPC · JPL
675916	2016 BG_{30}	—	November 20, 2003	Kitt Peak	Spacewatch	·	810 m	MPC · JPL
675917	2016 BA_{34}	—	January 14, 2012	Mount Lemmon	Mount Lemmon Survey	·	1.1 km	MPC · JPL
675918	2016 BJ_{35}	—	December 26, 2011	Mount Lemmon	Mount Lemmon Survey	·	970 m	MPC · JPL
675919	2016 BV_{38}	—	November 15, 2003	Kitt Peak	Spacewatch	·	870 m	MPC · JPL
675920	2016 BR_{43}	—	January 15, 2016	Haleakala	Pan-STARRS 1	·	1.5 km	MPC · JPL
675921	2016 BS_{44}	—	February 5, 2000	Kitt Peak	Spacewatch	·	2.5 km	MPC · JPL
675922	2016 BV_{45}	—	November 19, 2007	Kitt Peak	Spacewatch	MAS	710 m	MPC · JPL
675923	2016 BQ_{46}	—	February 4, 2005	Kitt Peak	Spacewatch	·	2.6 km	MPC · JPL
675924	2016 BV_{47}	—	September 17, 2014	Haleakala	Pan-STARRS 1	·	950 m	MPC · JPL
675925	2016 BN_{49}	—	May 13, 2007	Mount Lemmon	Mount Lemmon Survey	EOS	2.0 km	MPC · JPL
675926	2016 BV_{49}	—	July 15, 2013	Haleakala	Pan-STARRS 1	·	3.2 km	MPC · JPL
675927	2016 BG_{51}	—	November 19, 2003	Kitt Peak	Spacewatch	·	970 m	MPC · JPL
675928	2016 BT_{53}	—	March 9, 2005	Mount Lemmon	Mount Lemmon Survey	NYS	1.0 km	MPC · JPL
675929	2016 BL_{54}	—	March 8, 2013	Haleakala	Pan-STARRS 1	·	660 m	MPC · JPL
675930	2016 BZ_{55}	—	March 9, 2005	Mount Lemmon	Mount Lemmon Survey	NYS	960 m	MPC · JPL
675931	2016 BP_{59}	—	February 1, 2012	Kitt Peak	Spacewatch	·	710 m	MPC · JPL
675932	2016 BW_{59}	—	January 18, 2012	Mount Lemmon	Mount Lemmon Survey	·	1.1 km	MPC · JPL
675933	2016 BB_{65}	—	September 17, 2010	Mount Lemmon	Mount Lemmon Survey	MAS	630 m	MPC · JPL
675934	2016 BX_{67}	—	January 3, 2016	Haleakala	Pan-STARRS 1	H	420 m	MPC · JPL
675935	2016 BS_{72}	—	February 4, 2012	Haleakala	Pan-STARRS 1	·	700 m	MPC · JPL
675936	2016 BR_{73}	—	September 13, 2004	Kitt Peak	Spacewatch	·	2.2 km	MPC · JPL
675937	2016 BF_{74}	—	January 31, 2016	Haleakala	Pan-STARRS 1	·	1.1 km	MPC · JPL
675938	2016 BK_{77}	—	January 8, 2016	Haleakala	Pan-STARRS 1	·	1.6 km	MPC · JPL
675939	2016 BB_{79}	—	October 2, 2003	Kitt Peak	Spacewatch	·	1.1 km	MPC · JPL
675940	2016 BR_{81}	—	February 9, 2013	Haleakala	Pan-STARRS 1	H	410 m	MPC · JPL
675941	2016 BM_{83}	—	January 19, 2016	Mount Lemmon	Mount Lemmon Survey	H	530 m	MPC · JPL
675942	2016 BD_{84}	—	January 16, 2016	Haleakala	Pan-STARRS 1	HNS	970 m	MPC · JPL
675943	2016 BL_{84}	—	January 16, 2016	Haleakala	Pan-STARRS 1	·	1.3 km	MPC · JPL
675944	2016 BS_{85}	—	January 18, 2016	Haleakala	Pan-STARRS 1	·	1.4 km	MPC · JPL
675945	2016 BW_{85}	—	January 8, 2016	Haleakala	Pan-STARRS 1	·	1.7 km	MPC · JPL
675946	2016 BA_{86}	—	January 18, 2016	Haleakala	Pan-STARRS 1	HNS	1.0 km	MPC · JPL
675947	2016 BR_{86}	—	January 29, 2016	Haleakala	Pan-STARRS 1	·	1.4 km	MPC · JPL
675948	2016 BJ_{89}	—	January 17, 2016	Haleakala	Pan-STARRS 1	·	850 m	MPC · JPL
675949	2016 BO_{99}	—	April 17, 2012	Charleston	R. Holmes	BRG	1.1 km	MPC · JPL
675950	2016 BV_{100}	—	June 30, 2005	Palomar	NEAT	·	1.4 km	MPC · JPL
675951	2016 BW_{100}	—	January 14, 2011	Mount Lemmon	Mount Lemmon Survey	·	1.5 km	MPC · JPL
675952	2016 BX_{104}	—	January 31, 2016	Haleakala	Pan-STARRS 1	·	1.1 km	MPC · JPL
675953	2016 BJ_{109}	—	January 31, 2016	Haleakala	Pan-STARRS 1	EUN	850 m	MPC · JPL
675954	2016 BZ_{121}	—	January 30, 2016	Mount Lemmon	Mount Lemmon Survey	·	730 m	MPC · JPL
675955	2016 BS_{132}	—	January 18, 2016	Mount Lemmon	Mount Lemmon Survey	·	780 m	MPC · JPL
675956	2016 CY_{3}	—	October 6, 2008	Mount Lemmon	Mount Lemmon Survey	·	2.8 km	MPC · JPL
675957	2016 CT_{4}	—	January 30, 2008	Mount Lemmon	Mount Lemmon Survey	·	880 m	MPC · JPL
675958	2016 CL_{9}	—	January 13, 2008	Kitt Peak	Spacewatch	3:2	4.0 km	MPC · JPL
675959	2016 CQ_{9}	—	April 17, 2005	Kitt Peak	Spacewatch	·	800 m	MPC · JPL
675960	2016 CC_{10}	—	January 2, 2012	Mount Lemmon	Mount Lemmon Survey	·	1.2 km	MPC · JPL
675961	2016 CJ_{12}	—	December 28, 2011	Kitt Peak	Spacewatch	NYS	910 m	MPC · JPL
675962	2016 CO_{14}	—	February 6, 2000	Kitt Peak	Spacewatch	·	2.6 km	MPC · JPL
675963	2016 CZ_{14}	—	December 29, 2011	Kitt Peak	Spacewatch	·	920 m	MPC · JPL
675964	2016 CL_{16}	—	January 15, 2016	Haleakala	Pan-STARRS 1	·	960 m	MPC · JPL
675965	2016 CO_{16}	—	June 1, 2012	Mount Lemmon	Mount Lemmon Survey	·	2.7 km	MPC · JPL
675966	2016 CU_{17}	—	March 11, 2005	Kitt Peak	Spacewatch	·	1.0 km	MPC · JPL
675967	2016 CX_{20}	—	January 15, 2016	Haleakala	Pan-STARRS 1	·	710 m	MPC · JPL
675968	2016 CO_{21}	—	January 25, 2012	Haleakala	Pan-STARRS 1	·	940 m	MPC · JPL
675969	2016 CB_{22}	—	October 8, 2007	Catalina	CSS	V	610 m	MPC · JPL
675970	2016 CL_{23}	—	October 21, 1997	Kitt Peak	Spacewatch	·	2.8 km	MPC · JPL
675971	2016 CC_{24}	—	October 18, 2011	Haleakala	Pan-STARRS 1	PHO	870 m	MPC · JPL
675972	2016 CH_{27}	—	August 26, 2013	Haleakala	Pan-STARRS 1	·	4.2 km	MPC · JPL
675973	2016 CL_{28}	—	February 3, 2016	Haleakala	Pan-STARRS 1	·	770 m	MPC · JPL
675974	2016 CM_{28}	—	March 16, 2005	Catalina	CSS	·	1.5 km	MPC · JPL
675975	2016 CS_{28}	—	July 31, 2014	Haleakala	Pan-STARRS 1	RAF	860 m	MPC · JPL
675976	2016 CU_{28}	—	March 15, 2004	Kitt Peak	Spacewatch	·	1.6 km	MPC · JPL
675977	2016 CV_{28}	—	January 18, 2015	Haleakala	Pan-STARRS 1	·	2.9 km	MPC · JPL
675978	2016 CN_{30}	—	October 24, 2015	Haleakala	Pan-STARRS 1	H	510 m	MPC · JPL
675979	2016 CC_{31}	—	June 8, 2014	Mount Lemmon	Mount Lemmon Survey	H	380 m	MPC · JPL
675980	2016 CE_{36}	—	October 1, 2009	Mount Lemmon	Mount Lemmon Survey	EOS	1.8 km	MPC · JPL
675981	2016 CG_{37}	—	January 28, 2007	Kitt Peak	Spacewatch	·	1.3 km	MPC · JPL
675982	2016 CB_{40}	—	January 29, 2016	Mount Lemmon	Mount Lemmon Survey	MAS	700 m	MPC · JPL
675983	2016 CZ_{45}	—	July 31, 2014	Haleakala	Pan-STARRS 1	·	1.2 km	MPC · JPL
675984	2016 CY_{46}	—	January 7, 2016	Haleakala	Pan-STARRS 1	·	840 m	MPC · JPL
675985	2016 CM_{47}	—	January 7, 2016	Haleakala	Pan-STARRS 1	MAS	590 m	MPC · JPL
675986	2016 CD_{49}	—	January 29, 2016	Mount Lemmon	Mount Lemmon Survey	·	1.2 km	MPC · JPL
675987	2016 CH_{49}	—	September 17, 2014	Haleakala	Pan-STARRS 1	NYS	940 m	MPC · JPL
675988	2016 CD_{54}	—	January 10, 2008	Mount Lemmon	Mount Lemmon Survey	3:2 · SHU	4.7 km	MPC · JPL
675989	2016 CP_{57}	—	March 26, 2003	Palomar	NEAT	·	1.0 km	MPC · JPL
675990	2016 CA_{58}	—	November 21, 2009	Kitt Peak	Spacewatch	·	2.3 km	MPC · JPL
675991	2016 CG_{59}	—	January 14, 2016	Haleakala	Pan-STARRS 1	HNS	900 m	MPC · JPL
675992	2016 CA_{64}	—	October 26, 2008	Mount Lemmon	Mount Lemmon Survey	·	3.2 km	MPC · JPL
675993	2016 CK_{65}	—	April 8, 2006	Mount Lemmon	Mount Lemmon Survey	EOS	1.9 km	MPC · JPL
675994	2016 CM_{69}	—	July 6, 2014	Haleakala	Pan-STARRS 1	H	390 m	MPC · JPL
675995	2016 CL_{76}	—	January 13, 2016	Haleakala	Pan-STARRS 1	·	700 m	MPC · JPL
675996	2016 CR_{78}	—	January 19, 2008	Mount Lemmon	Mount Lemmon Survey	·	970 m	MPC · JPL
675997	2016 CE_{79}	—	February 21, 2012	Kitt Peak	Spacewatch	·	1.2 km	MPC · JPL
675998	2016 CM_{83}	—	January 31, 1995	Kitt Peak	Spacewatch	·	1.4 km	MPC · JPL
675999	2016 CG_{87}	—	July 28, 2014	Haleakala	Pan-STARRS 1	·	870 m	MPC · JPL
676000	2016 CT_{90}	—	May 8, 2005	Mount Lemmon	Mount Lemmon Survey	·	1.3 km	MPC · JPL

back to top

== Meaning of names ==
As minor planet discoveries are confirmed, they are given a permanent number by the IAU's Minor Planet Center (MPC), and the discoverers can then submit names for them, following the IAU's naming conventions. The list below concerns those minor planets in the specified number-range that have received names, and explains the meanings of those names.

Official naming citations of newly named small Solar System bodies are approved and published in a bulletin by IAU's Working Group for Small Bodies Nomenclature (WGSBN). Before May 2021, citations were published in MPC's Minor Planet Circulars for many decades. Recent citations can also be found on the JPL Small-Body Database (SBDB). Until his death in 2016, German astronomer Lutz D. Schmadel compiled these citations into the Dictionary of Minor Planet Names (DMP) and regularly updated the collection.

Based on Paul Herget's The Names of the Minor Planets, Schmadel also researched the unclear origin of numerous asteroids, most of which had been named prior to World War II. This article incorporates text from this source, which is in the public domain: SBDB New namings may only be added to this list below after official publication as the preannouncement of names is condemned. The WGSBN publishes a comprehensive guideline for the naming rules of non-cometary small Solar System bodies.

Named minor planet	Provisional	This minor planet was named for...	Ref · Catalog
675570 Mircealițe	2015 XD_{307}	Mircea Lițe, Romanian museographer of Baia Mare Planetarium.	IAU · 676570
