= South Australian Space Industry Centre =

Government-funded coordination centre for the space industry in South Australia

Agency overview
- Formed: 12 December 2018
- Jurisdiction: Government of South Australia
- Employees: 20
- Parent department: Australian Space Agency
- Website: sasic.sa.gov.au

The South Australian Space Industry Centre (SASIC) was created by the South Australian Government to be the home to the Australian Space Agency and bring together over 90 space-related organisations. It is based out of Lot Fourteen, an innovation precinct based in the Adelaide city centre.

South Australia was in competition from other states to secure the location of the headquarters of the space agency, and won the bid to form the headquarters of the Australian Space Agency at Lot Fourteen. It was established on 12 December 2018.

== See also ==
- Australian Space Agency
- ThincLab
- Innovation Collaboration Centre
