= Innovation Collaboration Centre =

South Australian incubator

- Industry: Startup incubator
- Headquarters: Adelaide, South Australia
- Key people: Jasmine Vreugdenburg (Director)
- Parent: University of South Australia
- Website: icc.unisa.edu.au

The Innovation Collaboration Centre (ICC) is a startup incubator based in Adelaide, South Australia, which runs Venture Catalyst Space to help companies grow their businesses in the space industry. It is part of the University of South Australia, and has funded several startups as of 2022.

== Description ==
Based in Adelaide, ICC runs the Venture Catalyst Hi-Tech & Venture Catalyst Space program. The ICC is partly funded and supported by the Government of South Australia, the University of South Australia and South Australian Space Industry Centre.

== Startups ==
Some of the startups which have been funded by the ICC include:

- Ping Services, which was part of the first cohort of the Venture Catalyst Space program in 2018. Ping Services created the Ping Monitor, which measures the health of a wind turbine based on its acoustic signature and sound generated by the turbine blades as they rotate. Ping has since liaised with most of the major wind turbine operators in Australia, Europe and the United States.
- FireFlight, which has received $100,000 from Go2Gov, a South Australian government initiative to work with the South Australian Country Fire Service to fight bushfires.
- Astroport Space Technologies who were awarded a contract with NASA
- Hex20, which was selected for the "Moon to Mars" initiative feasibility grant by the Australian Space Agency
- framework.tools, who received a $10,000 grant from the ICC to develop an all-in-one platform for teams and individuals to manage projects, sales piplelines, customer relationship management, wikis and custom tools and have received over $135k in funding.

The 2021 Venture Catalyst Space Cohort raised over A$4.6 million.

== See also ==
- Lot Fourteen
- ThincLab
