= University of South Australia =

Public university in Adelaide

Coordinates: 34°55′14″S 138°36′16″E

- Other name: Adelaide University (Note: After merging with the University of Adelaide in January 2026.)
- Former names: Antecedent colleges (1856–1991); South Australian Institute of Technology (1960–1991)
- Motto: Australia's University of Enterprise
- Type: Public research university
- Active: 1856 (antecedent); 1991 (as university); –31 March 2026
- Accreditation: TEQSA
- Affiliations: Australian Technology Network (ATN)
- Academic affiliations: Australian Space Agency; SAHMRI; UoA; OUA; Universities Australia
- Chancellor: John Hill
- Vice-Chancellor: David Lloyd
- Academic staff: 1,203 (FTE, 2023)
- Administrative staff: 1,520 (FTE, 2023)
- Total staff: 2,942 (2023)
- Students: 34,878 (2023)
- Undergraduates: 4,204 (EFTSL, 2023)
- Postgraduates: 10,709 (EFTSL, 2023)
- Location: North Terrace, Adelaide, South Australia, 5001, Australia
- Campus: Metropolitan and regional, with multiple sites
- Colours: UniSA Blue
- Nickname: Team UniSA
- Mascots: Koala and Parchie
- Website: unisa.edu.au

The University of South Australia (UniSA) was a public research university based in Adelaide, South Australia. Established in 1991, it was the successor of the former South Australian Institute of Technology (SAIT). In mid-2023, it agreed to merge with the neighbouring University of Adelaide to form Adelaide University. The merger began in 2024, with the merged university formally opening in January 2026. The existing institutions were formally disestablished after 31 March 2026, when the University of Adelaide Act 1971 and University of South Australia Act 1990 were repealed.

UniSA's earliest antecedent institutions were both founded in the Jubilee Exhibition Building of the former Royal South Australian Society of Arts. SAIT was founded in 1889 as the School of Mines and Industries, and the South Australian College of Advanced Education dates back to the School of Art in 1856. The institute gained university status following their merger in 1991. Its expansion over three decades, including to sites on the west end of North Terrace, along with broadening its fields of studies, contributed to its status as the state's largest university, with 34,878 students in 2023.

The university comprised six campuses, including the City East and City West campuses along North Terrace, a tech-oriented campus in Mawson Lakes, the Magill campus specialising in social sciences, and two regional campuses in Mount Gambier and Whyalla. Its academic activities were divided among the seven academic units. In 2023, the university had a revenue of A$715.5 million. It was a member of the Australian Technology Network, an association of technology-focussed universities.

Notable alumni of the university include the incumbent foreign affairs minister Penny Wong; Human Rights Watch director Tirana Hassan; founding editor-in-chief of Vogue China Angelica Cheung; former state premier Steven Marshall; and retired politician Christopher Pyne. UniSA also managed several museums and exhibitions in a range of fields, including the Samstag Museum and Adelaide Planetarium, and formed part of the state's space and defence industry.

== History ==
The University of South Australia was formed in 1991 following by the merger between the South Australian Institute of Technology with three campuses belonging to the South Australian College of Advanced Education.

=== Antecedent institutions ===
==== School of Art ====
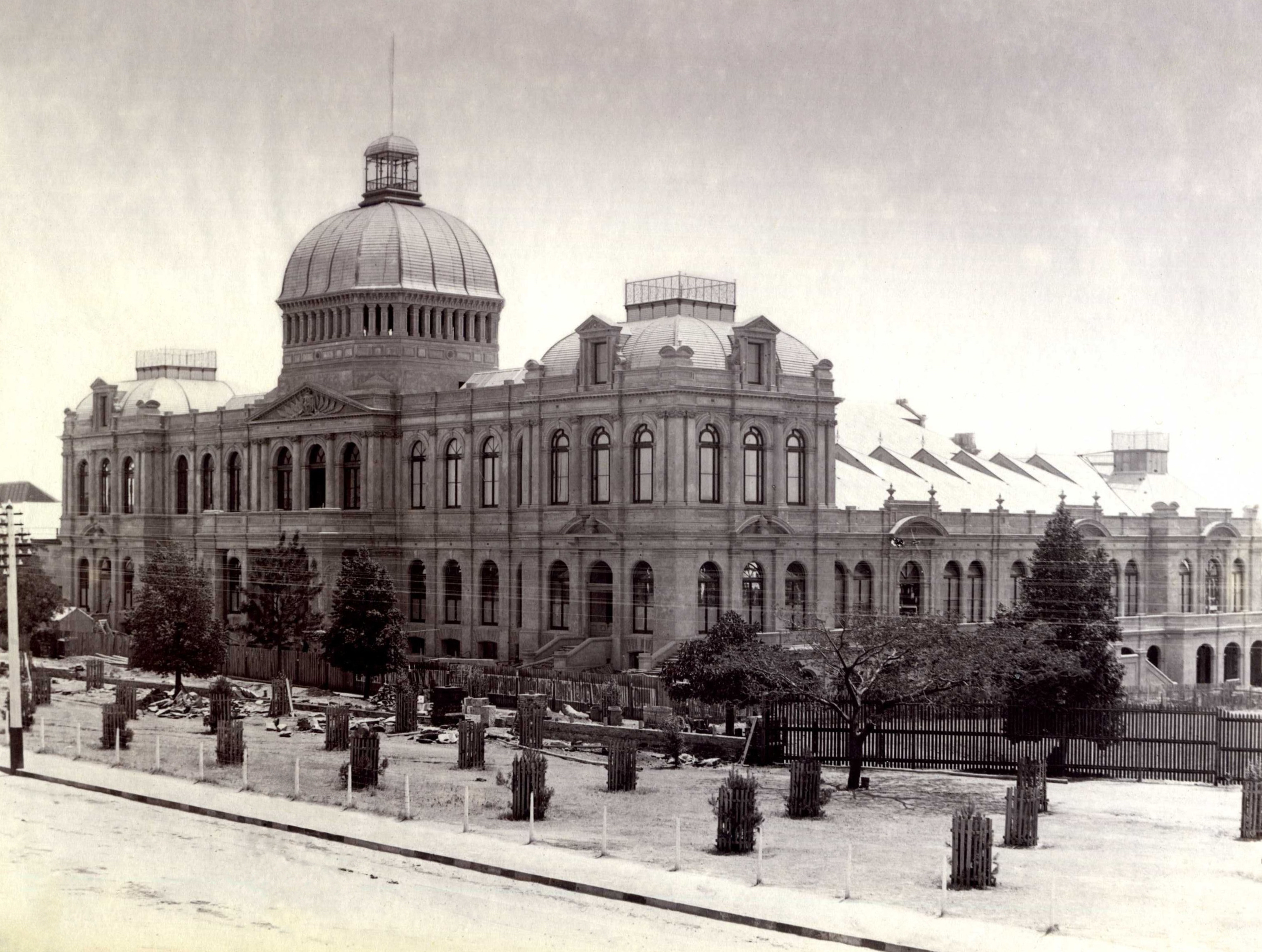
The now-demolished Jubilee Exhibition Building in 1885

The South Australian School of Art, the earliest antecedent institution of the University of South Australia, was established in 1856 at the former Royal South Australian Society of Arts. The independent art school, which went through many name changes, and resided for much of its history at the Jubilee Exhibition Building. The Jubilee Exhibition Building remained on the University of Adelaide campus until 1962, when the building was demolished to make way for several university buildings. at which time the art college was temporarily relocated in Stanley Street, North Adelaide. In 1973, SASA merged with Western Teachers College to form Torrens College of Advanced Education. It is one of the oldest art schools in Australia, and the oldest public art school.

As of 2025 the South Australian School of Art is incorporated into UniSA Creative, which includes the disciplines of architecture and planning; art and design; journalism, communication, and media; film, television, and visual effects; and the creative industries. The SASA Gallery in the Kuarna Building, which showcases creative works by students and researchers, is the modern descendant of the school.

==== South Australian Institute of Technology ====
The Jubilee Exhibition Building was also the birthplace of the South Australian Institute of Technology which was established in 1889 as the SA School of Mines and Industries. It moved to the neighbouring Brookman Building in 1903, named after the Scottish-born businessman George Brookman who contributed £15,000 towards its construction.

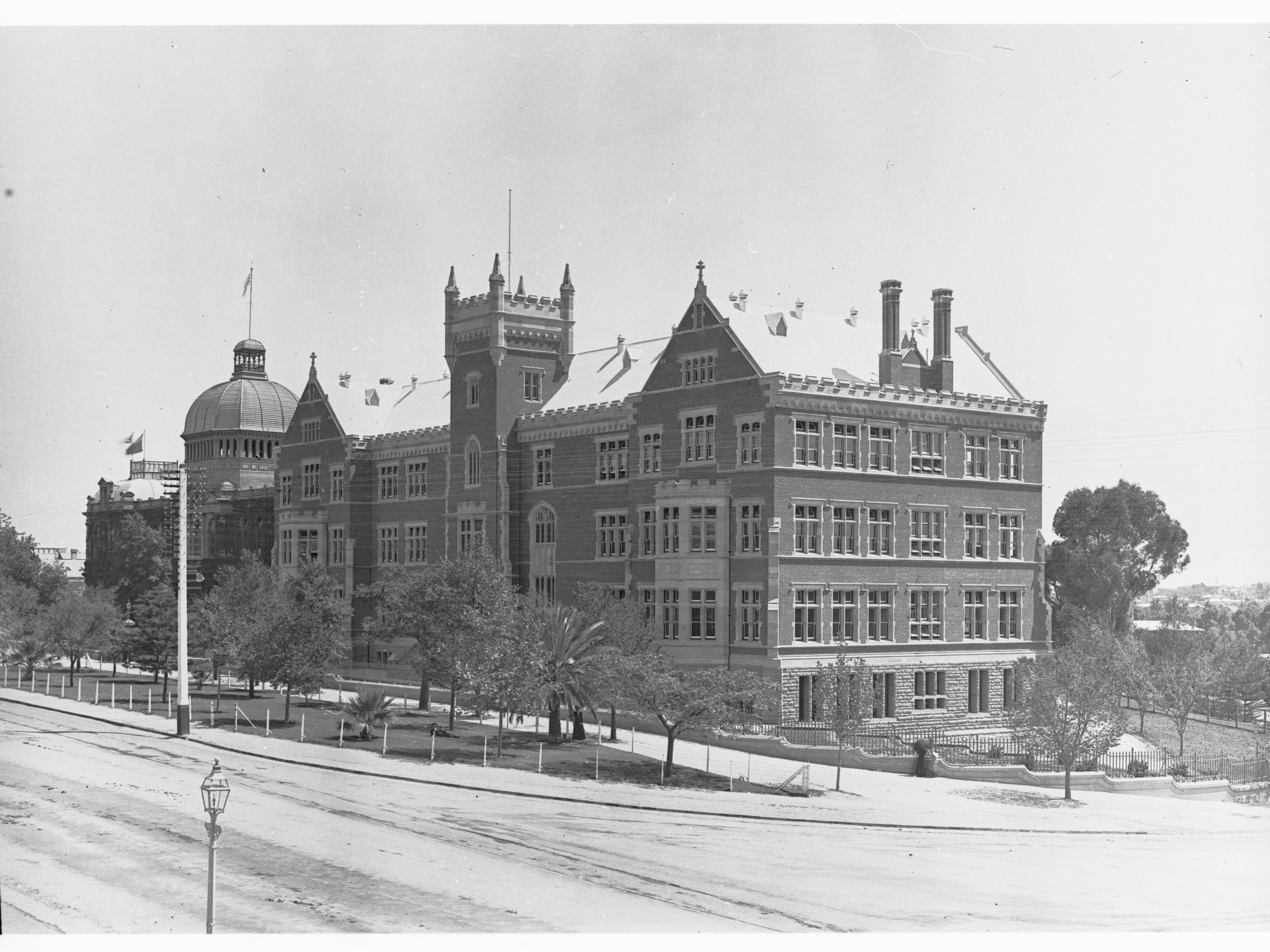
Brookman Building (1903), shortly after its construction

The building, which took three years to complete, was opened by then-state governor Samuel Way. It is located on the site formerly the eastern annexe of the Jubilee Exhibition Building on the corner of North Terrace and Frome Road between the University of Adelaide and the then-Royal Adelaide Hospital. When opened, only the main hall was named after George Brookman, and a plaque commemorating his contribution is still located in the hall. The Brookman Building in the nearby Grenfell Street, now the site of the Grenfell Centre, was his business headquarters.

The institute maintained strong ties with the neighbouring University of Adelaide that included the co-ordination of teaching, laboratories and examinations across fields of engineering and sciences. Despite the university later establishing its own faculty of engineering in 1937, the reciprocal relationship remained intertwined to its University Council and studies completed at the institute were recognised as equivalent studies eligible for credit towards university courses. The institute later expanded to the regional city of Whyalla in 1962 and to the Adelaide suburb of Mawson Lakes in 1972 as The Levels. In 1965, it was designated an advanced college which initiated an expansion in the variety of courses available. The campuses on North Terrace, Mawson Lakes and Whyalla all remain a part of the University of South Australia.

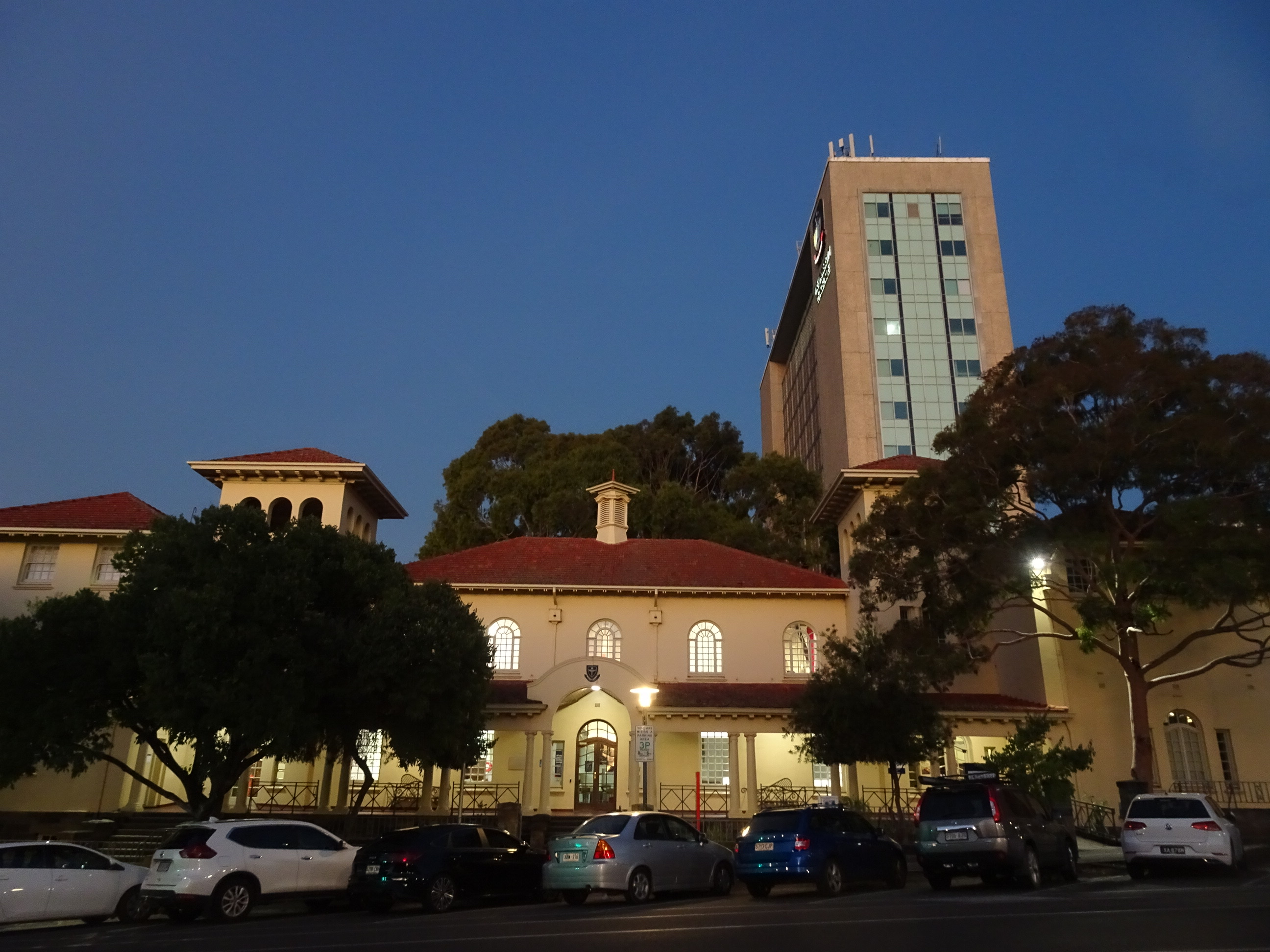
The Hartley Building of the original mother college and SACAE, later absorbed by the University of Adelaide

==== South Australian College of Advanced Education ====
The Adelaide Teachers College, which changed names and shifted locations multiple times throughout its existence, was established in 1876. Despite not being located at the University of Adelaide campus until 1900, students from the institution attended university lectures since at least 1878. In 1921, it renamed to the Adelaide Teachers College, in line with other interstate teachers colleges. Despite offers from the university to take control of the college, which was heavily integrated into the university, the Education Department retained administrative authority throughout its early history. The Hartley Building was built as its permanent home in 1927.

The college eventually renamed to the Adelaide College of the Arts and Education. It also established additional teachers colleges in other parts of the city including Magill. Following a series of mergers, the colleges expanded to become advanced colleges which all later amalgamated with the original mother college to become the South Australian College of Advanced Education in 1982. The combined institution continued its presence alongside the University of Adelaide with which it maintained joint teaching, facilities and committees. The campus merged with the latter university in 1991 with three of the remaining campuses merging with the SAIT to establish the University of South Australia.

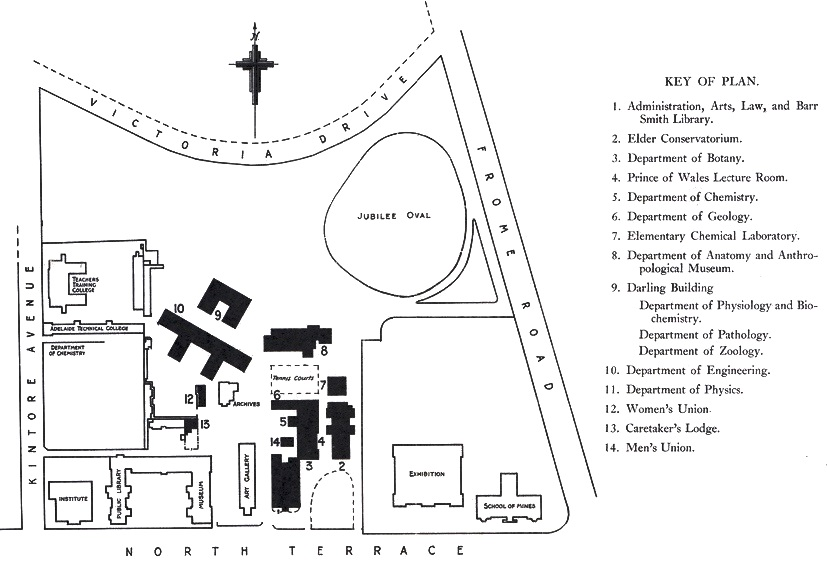
The SAIT and neighbouring institutions in 1926

==== Others ====
In 1973, the South Australian School of Art merged with Western Teachers College to form Torrens College of Advanced Education.

=== Merger and establishment ===
Stronger demand for advanced college places throughout the country resulted from a broadening appeal of higher education beyond the traditionally elite education provided by the universities. Advanced colleges were originally designed to complement universities, forming a binary system modelled on that of the United Kingdom. It was originally created by the Menzies government following World War II on the advice of a committee led by physicist Leslie H. Martin, during a period of high population growth and corresponding demand for secondary and tertiary education. This sector ceased to exist when, between 1989 and 1992, the Hawke-Keating government implemented the sweeping reforms of Education Minister John Dawkins that dismantled the binary system. The states, eager for increased education funding, merged the colleges either with existing universities or with each other to form new universities. Following its expansion and increasing autonomy from the University of Adelaide, the South Australian Institute of Technology was given the option to merge with either TAFE South Australia or the South Australian College of Advanced Education. It chose to merge with the latter advanced college resulting in the establishment of the University of South Australia, which continues to remain neighbours with the University of Adelaide.

The University of South Australia became the state's third public university, a continuation of the former South Australian Institute of Technology that merged with most of the SACAE, and maintained their historical presence next to the University of Adelaide, in the suburbs of Mawson Lakes and Magill and in the regional city of Whyalla. Its expansion over the next few decades, including to sites on the west end of North Terrace, and broadening fields of studies contributed to its status as the state's largest university by student population. It also became the second-largest university nationally by number of online students, either in the state or from other parts of the country, and expanded to Mount Gambier in 2005. In 2021, the university celebrated its 30th birthday.

=== Ongoing merger with the University of Adelaide ===
In June 2018, the University of South Australia and the University of Adelaide began discussions regarding the possibility of a merger. The proposition was dubbed a "super uni" by then South Australian premier, Steven Marshall, and Simon Birmingham, but the merger was called off in October 2018 by the University of South Australia, which was less keen. Vice-chancellor David Lloyd, in an email to University of South Australia staff, claimed that the amalgamation lacked a compelling case. This statement was contradicted by the University of Adelaide's chancellor who said that the merger continues to be in the state's best interests and a spokesperson for the university added that it was still open to future talks. Following the release of several internal FOI documents retrieved by ABC News, it was later revealed that the merger talks failed due to disagreements on the post-merger institution's leadership structure. The name Adelaide University of South Australia was agreed upon by both universities and Chris Schacht, who previously served on the University of Adelaide Council, alleged that the merger talks failed due to disagreement on which vice-chancellor would replace the other following their amalgamation.

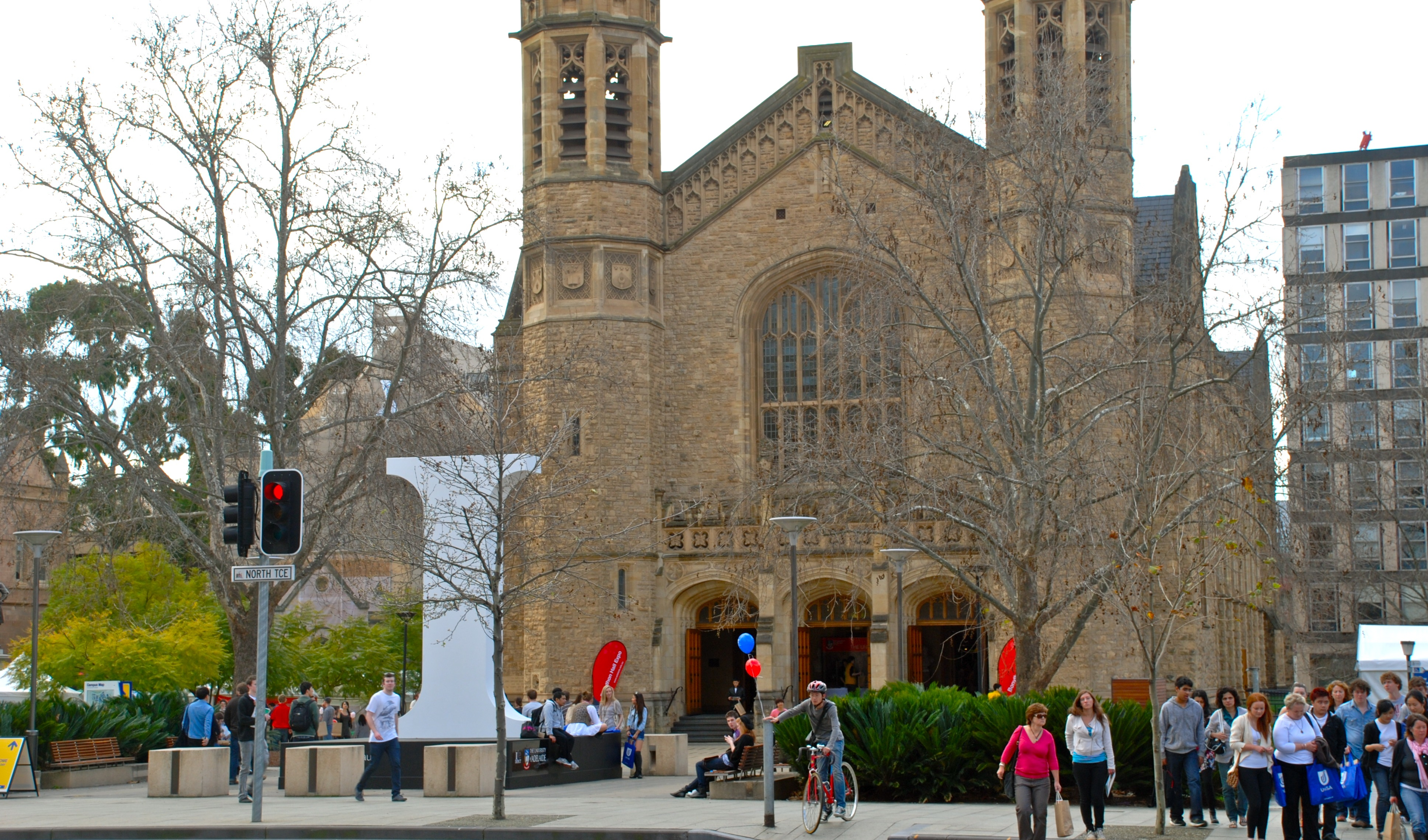
Students from the two neighbouring universities near Bonython Hall on North Terrace

In early 2022, the topic of a merger was raised again by the new state government led by premier Peter Malinauskas, which proposed setting up an independent commission to investigate the possibility of a merger between the state's three public universities should they decline. He had made an election promise to take a heavy-handed approach towards the merger to reduce students departing to higher-ranking institutions on the east coast and to improve the state's ability to attract international students and researchers. At the time, staff's opinions were evenly divided on the idea of the commission. Following the appointment of merger advocate Peter Høj as University of Adelaide vice-chancellor, both universities announced that a merger would once again be considered. The universities began a feasibility study into a potential merger at the end of the year. The invitation to merger negotiations was rejected by Flinders University, the state's third public university.

The agreement for the merger was reached on 1 July 2023 by the two universities, which then accounted for approximately two-thirds of the state's public university population, in consultation with the South Australian Government. The rationale for the amalgamation was a larger institutional scale may be needed in order to increase the universities' ranking positions, ability to secure future research income and a net positive impact on the state economy. The two universities argued that by combining their expertise, resources and finances into a single institution, they can be more financially viable, with stronger teaching and research outcomes. Support for the merger among existing staff were mixed, with a National Tertiary Education Union SA survey showing that only a quarter were in favour of the amalgamation. Warren Bebbington, who previously served as vice-chancellor at the University of Adelaide, described the proposed institution as a "lumbering dinosaur" in reference to its timing during an ongoing federal review of the higher education sector. Vice-chancellor Colin Stirling described plans to provide the new institution with A$300 million in research funding and scholarships as "unfair" to students who choose to study at Flinders University. The combined figure was later revised to A$464.5 million to include land purchases, with an additional A$40 million research fund set up for Flinders University.

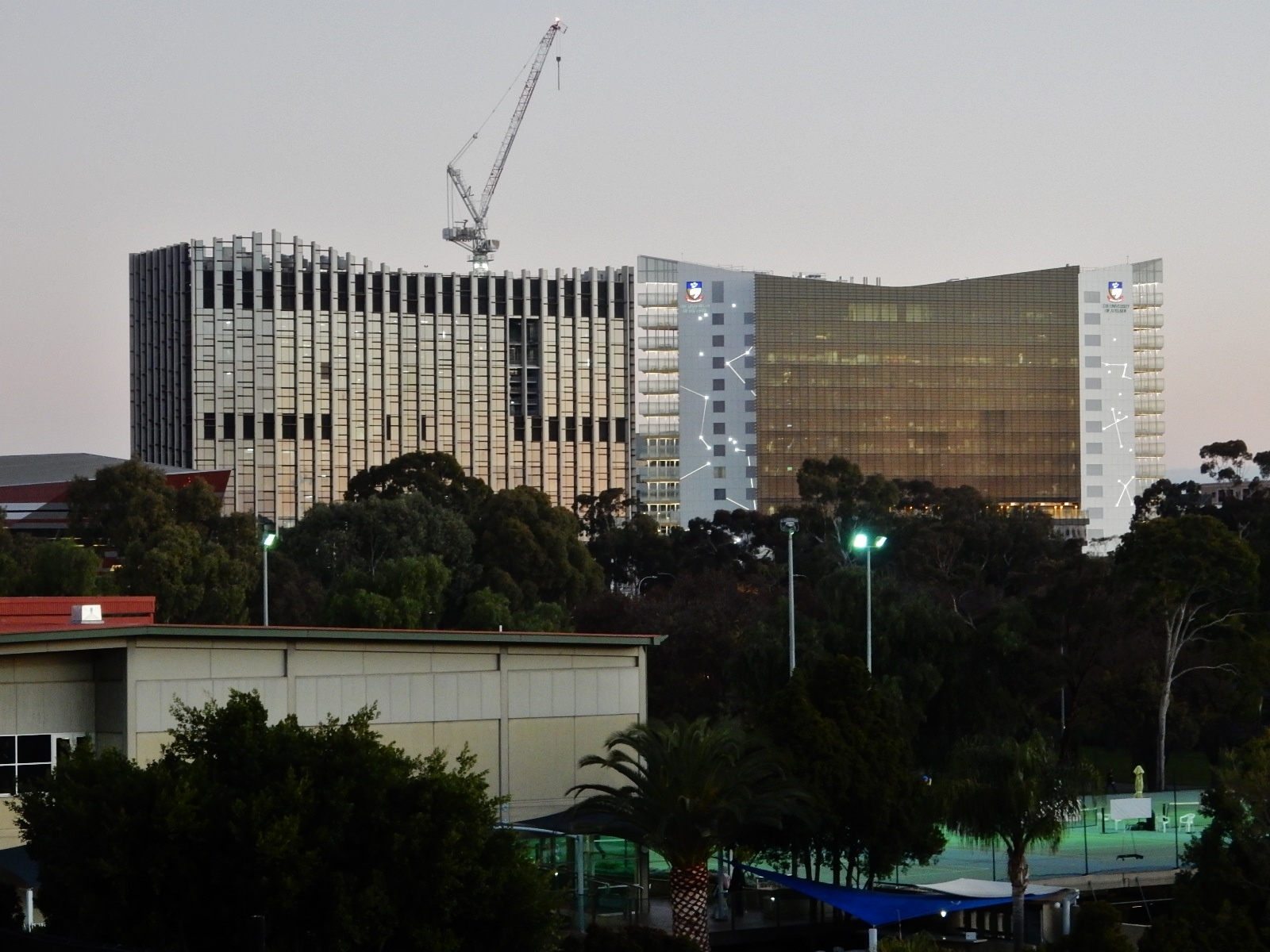
The University of South Australia (left) is set to merge with the University of Adelaide (right) by 1 January 2026

In November 2023, legislation passed state parliament enabling the creation of the new university to be named Adelaide University, previously a colloquial name used by the University of Adelaide. An application for self-accreditation authority was submitted to the Tertiary Education Quality and Standards Agency (TEQSA) on 15 January 2024, which was needed for the institution to offer courses that issue qualifications. Following approval on 22 May 2024, students starting studies at the pre-merger institutions from 2025 onwards will be issued degree certificates from Adelaide University. Students enrolled on or prior to 2024 will also be able to opt in adding antecedent institutions' names and logos on their parchments. The combined institution is expected to become operational by January 2026, with an additional transitional period extending to 2034. It is projected to have 70,000 students at launch, with one-in-four students being international students, and contribute approximately A$4.7 billion to the Australian economy annually. The amalgamation has been subject to mixed reactions.

== Campuses and buildings ==
The university had six campuses in South Australia including the City East and City West campuses in the Adelaide city centre, the two metropolitan campuses in Magill and Mawson Lakes and two regional campuses in Mount Gambier and Whyalla.

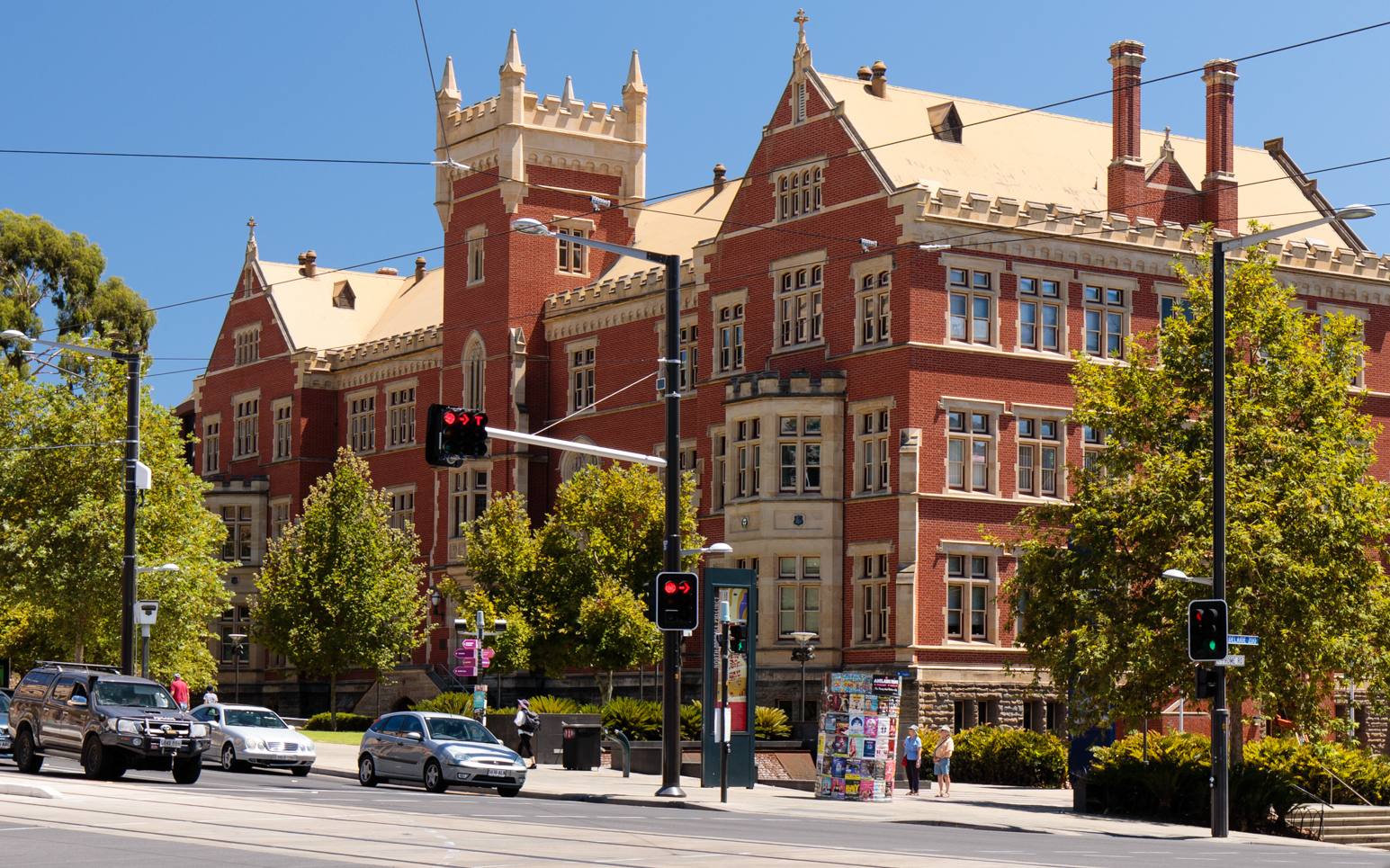
The Brookman Building of the university is its ancestral home

=== City East ===
The City East campus was located on the corner of North Terrace and Frome Road, next to the University of Adelaide.

The main Brookman Building, constructed in 1903 and named after its benefactor George Brookman, formed part of the original School of Mines and Industries later renamed to the South Australian Institute of Technology. It was inherited by the university, which also later expanded to the west end of the terrace as City West. The David Murray Library is the main library on the site and is located in the Brookman Building. It is named after Scottish-born merchant and politician David Murray who donated £2000 towards the library.

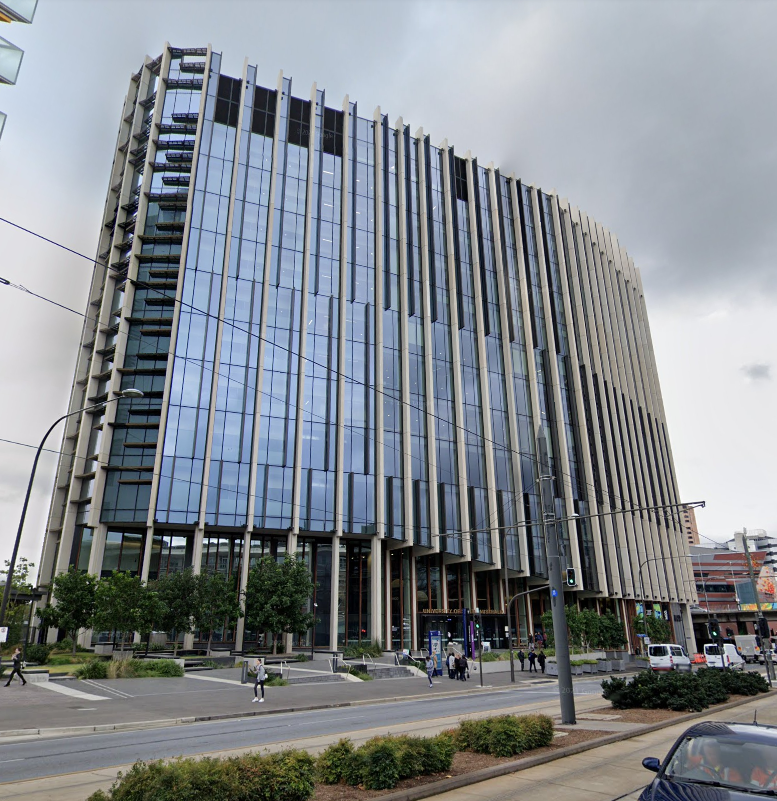
Bradley Building

The original SAIT campus has undergone several building upgrades and expansions. The Basil Hetzel Building was opened in 2005 and includes 2,000 square metres (22,000 sq ft) of multipurpose biomechanical, pharmaceutical and microbiological laboratory space. There was also a major reconstruction to the main Brookman Building from 2008 to 2009 to include a new outdoor plaza, a new exercise physiology clinic, outdoor walkways, student lounges and other upgrades. Some other notable buildings on the east end of the campus include the Playford Building, Bonython Jubilee Building and Centenary Building.

=== City West ===
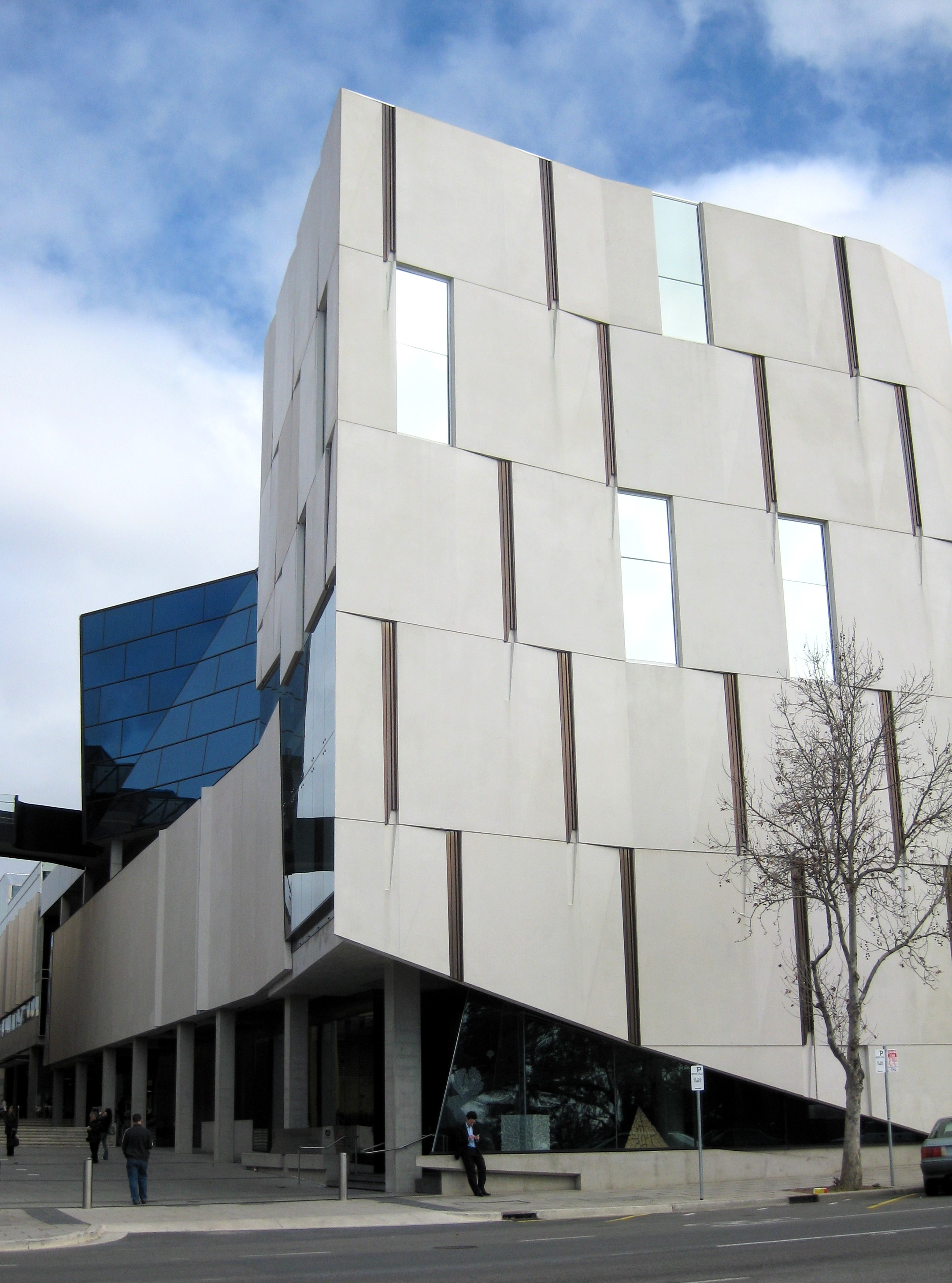
Hawke Building

The City West campus was located on the west end of North Terrace. As the university had expanded to the west end of North Terrace over several decades following its establishment, the buildings on the site were considerably newer than on the east.

The Bradley Building named after Denise Bradley, is home to various clinical and simulation facilities in the fields of healthcare and medicine, form part of the Adelaide BioMed City Precinct which also includes the affiliated Royal Adelaide Hospital and the South Australian Health and Medical Research Institute.

==== Hawke Building ====
The Hawke Building, also the chancellery, was named after former prime minister Bob Hawke and was constructed in 2007. Designed by Wardle, the distinctive two-storey building won the Jack McConnell Award of Merit for Public Architecture at the 2008 RAIA SA Architecture Awards; an RAIA SA Award of Merit for Interior Architecture; and a National Commendation for Public Architecture in the RAIA National Architecture Awards. The Hawke Building was home to the Bob Hawke Prime Ministerial Centre (known as the Hawke Centre); Kerry Packer Civic Gallery; Samstag Museum; the Allan Scott Auditorium, with a seating capacity of 400 seats; and the Bradley Forum with 150 seats.

==== Jeffrey Smart Building ====
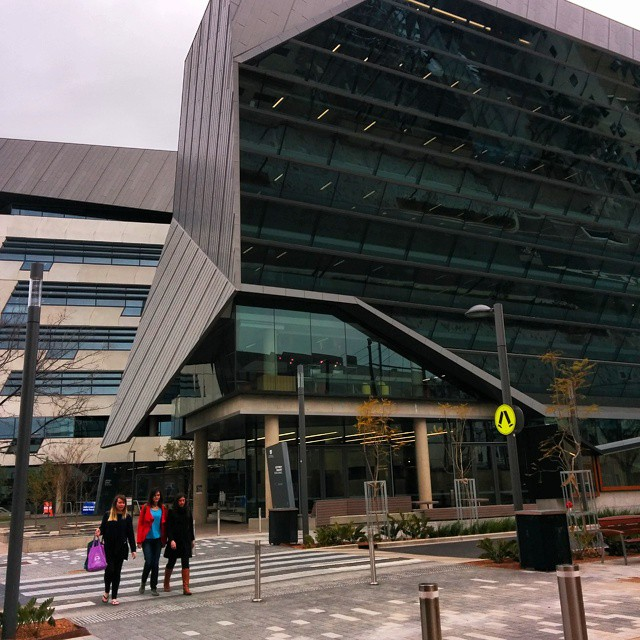
The Jeffrey Smart Building

The adjacent Jeffrey Smart Building, named after artist Jeffrey Smart, was constructed in 2014. It was a student hub that comprises "open plan" teaching and learning spaces, the main library on the east end and a central green common area with an outdoor cinema.

==== Pridham Hall ====
Pridham Hall was a gymnasium and multi-sport facility constructed in 2018. It was designed as a collaboration between Norwegian architecture firm Snøhetta, JPE Design Studio and JamFactory. It featured a 25 metres (82 ft) heated swimming pool, gymnasium, dance studio, a sloping roof amphitheatre and a 1,600 square metres (17,000 sq ft) convertible great hall that could be used for both sports or hosting events with up to 2,000 attendees. It was funded largely by alumni, including its namesake Andrew Pridham and his family who donated A$5 million toward its construction.

==== Other City West buildings ====
Other buildings on the western end included the Kaurna Building, Barbara Hanrahan Building, Yungondi Building, Lewis O'Brien Building, Elton Mayo Building, David Pank Building, Catherine Helen Spence Building, Dorrit Black Building, Way Lee Building, Sir George Kingston Building, Sir Hans Heysen Building, Rowland Rees Building, Liverpool Street Studios, and the Enterprise Hub.

=== Magill ===
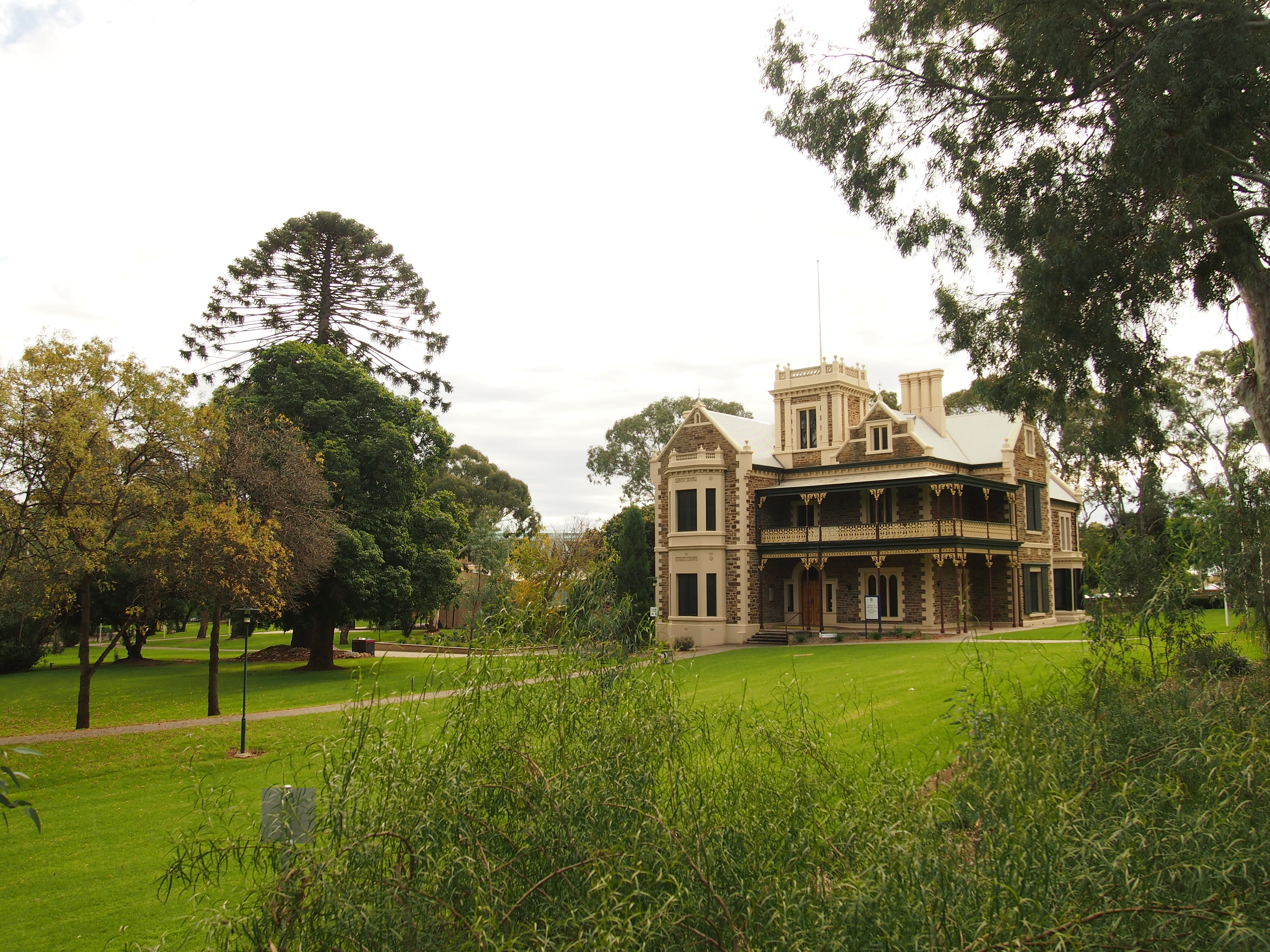
The Magill campus includes the heritage-listed Murray House and surrounding parklands

The Magill campus was established in 1973 and was located on St Bernards Road in the eastern Adelaide suburb of Magill. The campus specialises in the social sciences, psychology, neuroscience, teacher education, sports science, journalism, creative industries, human services, social work, media and communication. It also hosted several media studios, research laboratories, health clinics, a Samsung SMARTSchool and the de Lissa Institute of Early Childhood and Family Studies named after Montessori education pioneer Lillian Daphne de Lissa.

The parkland campus includes the heritage-listed Murray House, named after Scottish-born pastoralist Alexander Borthwick Murray. Built in 1884 and later expanded, the stone building incorporates Victorian-era Italianate and Gothic Revival architecture styles. According to legend, a blonde girl or young woman in Victorian-era attire named May supposedly haunts the manor, scaring patrons from the balcony or stairways. The urban myth, one of many supposed Ghosts of Murray Park, are akin to the white lady phenomenon in other parts of the world. The house replaced an earlier home built in 1854.

As part of the merger, the entirety of the campus was sold for housing and commercial re-development. As of 2024 approximately half of the campus is leased back to the university for a period of up to 10 years.

=== Mawson Lakes ===
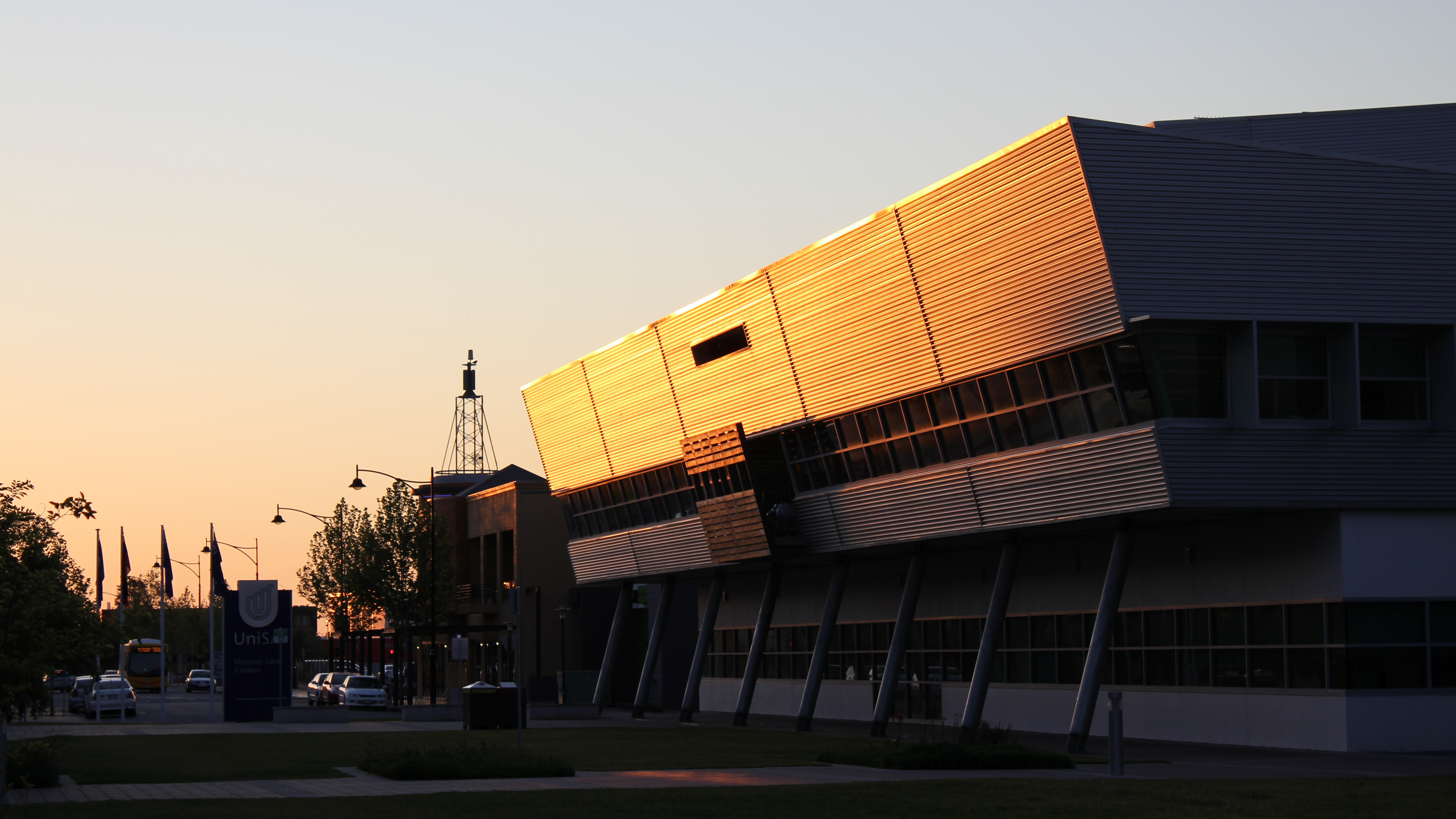
Building X on the Mawson Lakes campus adjacent to Technology Park Adelaide

The Mawson Lakes campus, established in 1972 as The Levels, was located in the northern Adelaide suburb of Mawson Lakes along 144 hectares (360 acres) of wetlands. It specialises in fields of science, engineering, computer science, environmental sciences, civil aviation and teacher education. It was also home to the Adelaide Planetarium and several information technology and engineering laboratories, including a defence research lab and the Future Industries Institute. The campus also has Airbus A320 and Boeing 737 flight and airport simulators and offers pilot training through its aviation academy at the nearby Parafield Airport.

It is also neighbours with the Adelaide Technology Park which is home to the Australian offices of Lockheed Martin, Raytheon, Northrop Grumman, General Dynamics, Saab among other multinational companies in the space and defence technology sectors.

As part of the merger, more than half of the campus has been sold for housing and commercial development. It is one of two campuses belonging to the University of South Australia where land was sold.

=== Whyalla ===
The Whyalla campus was established in 1962 and is the largest regional campus in South Australia. Located in city of Whyalla in the Eyre Peninsula, it is set on 22 hectares (54 acres) and offers studies in teacher education, nursing, midwifery, physiotherapy, occupational therapy, social work and human services.

=== Mount Gambier ===
Based in the Limestone Coast, the Mount Gambier campus was established in 2005 and offers studies in commerce, teacher education, nursing, midwifery, social work and human services. It is located in Mount Gambier, the largest regional city in South Australia. The campus also conducts research on forest management.

== Governance and structure ==
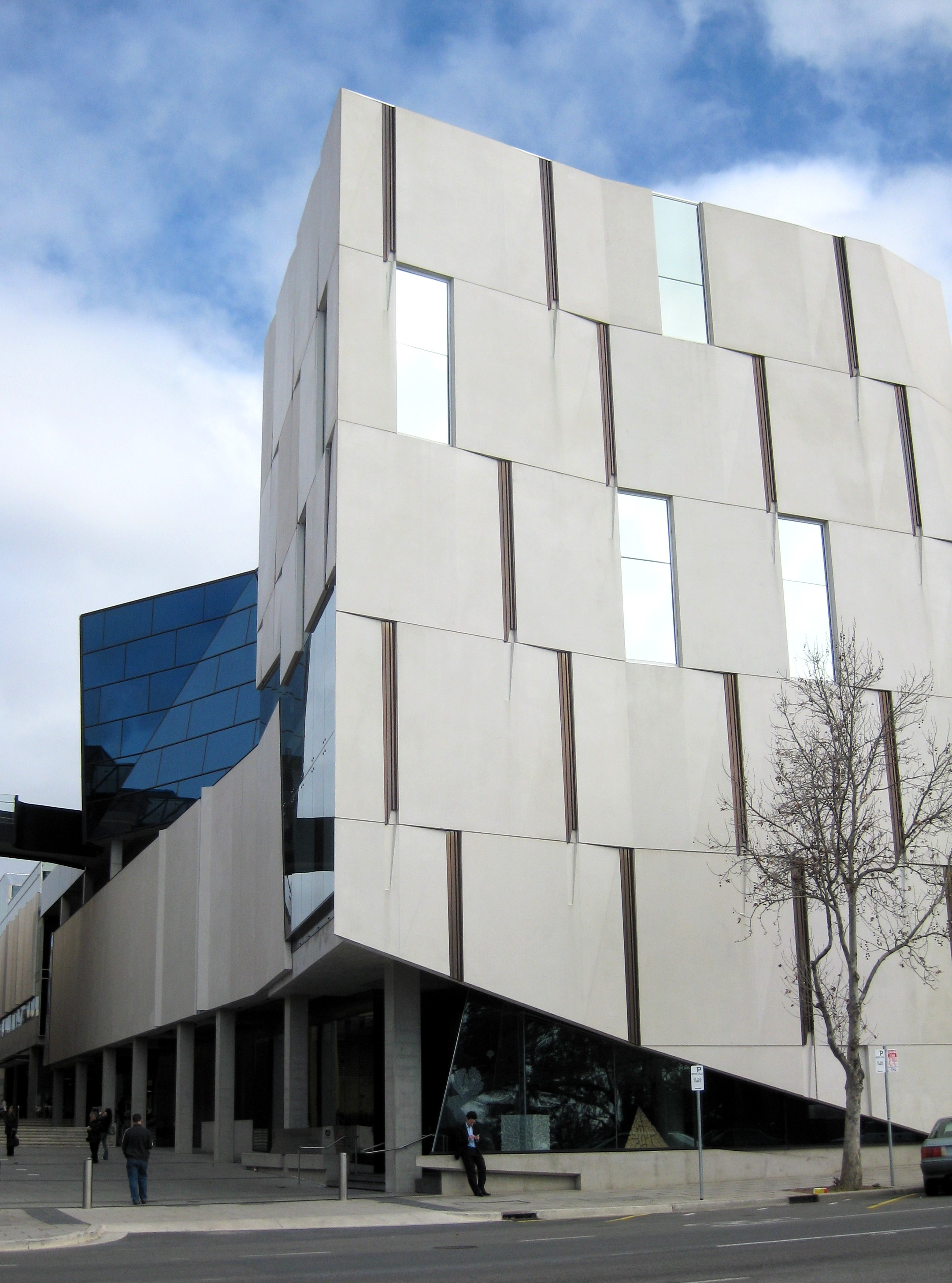
The Hawke Building is the chancellery on the west end

=== Academic units ===
The establishment of academic units was formally the responsibility of its University Council. The university is divided into seven academic units. These include:

- UniSA Allied Health & Human Performance
- UniSA Business
- UniSA Clinical & Health Sciences
- UniSA Creative
- UniSA Education Futures
- UniSA Justice & Society
- UniSA STEM

=== University Council ===
The main governing body of the institution was its Council. It was the executive committee responsible for managing operations, setting policies and appointing the chancellor and vice-chancellor. The Council was composed of the chancellor, vice-chancellor, a member of the academic staff, a member of the professional staff, an undergraduate student, a postgraduate student, at least one member with a commercial background, two members with prior experience in financial management and other members appointed by the selection committee. The selection committee, which comprises the chancellor and six other appointed members, could appoint members to the Council.

==== Chancellor and Vice-Chancellor ====
The chancellor of the university was a limitless term position that was mainly ceremonial and was held (in its final iteration) by former politician John Hill – succeeding Pauline Carr, who had left to serve the equivalent position at Adelaide University in May 2024. John was appointed by the University Council. The final vice-chancellor was Irish biochemist David Lloyd, who began his role in January 2013 following the departure of Peter Høj who left to serve the same position at the University of Adelaide. While the chancellor's office was largely ceremonial, the vice-chancellor served as the university's de facto principal administrative officer. The university's internal governance was carried out by the University Council formed through the University of South Australia Act 1991.

=== Finances ===
In 2023, the university had a revenue of A$715.47 million (2022 – A$667.5 million), an expenditure of A$732.66 million (2022 – A$675.49 million) and net assets of A$1.46 billion (2022 – A$1.48 billion).

== Academic profile ==
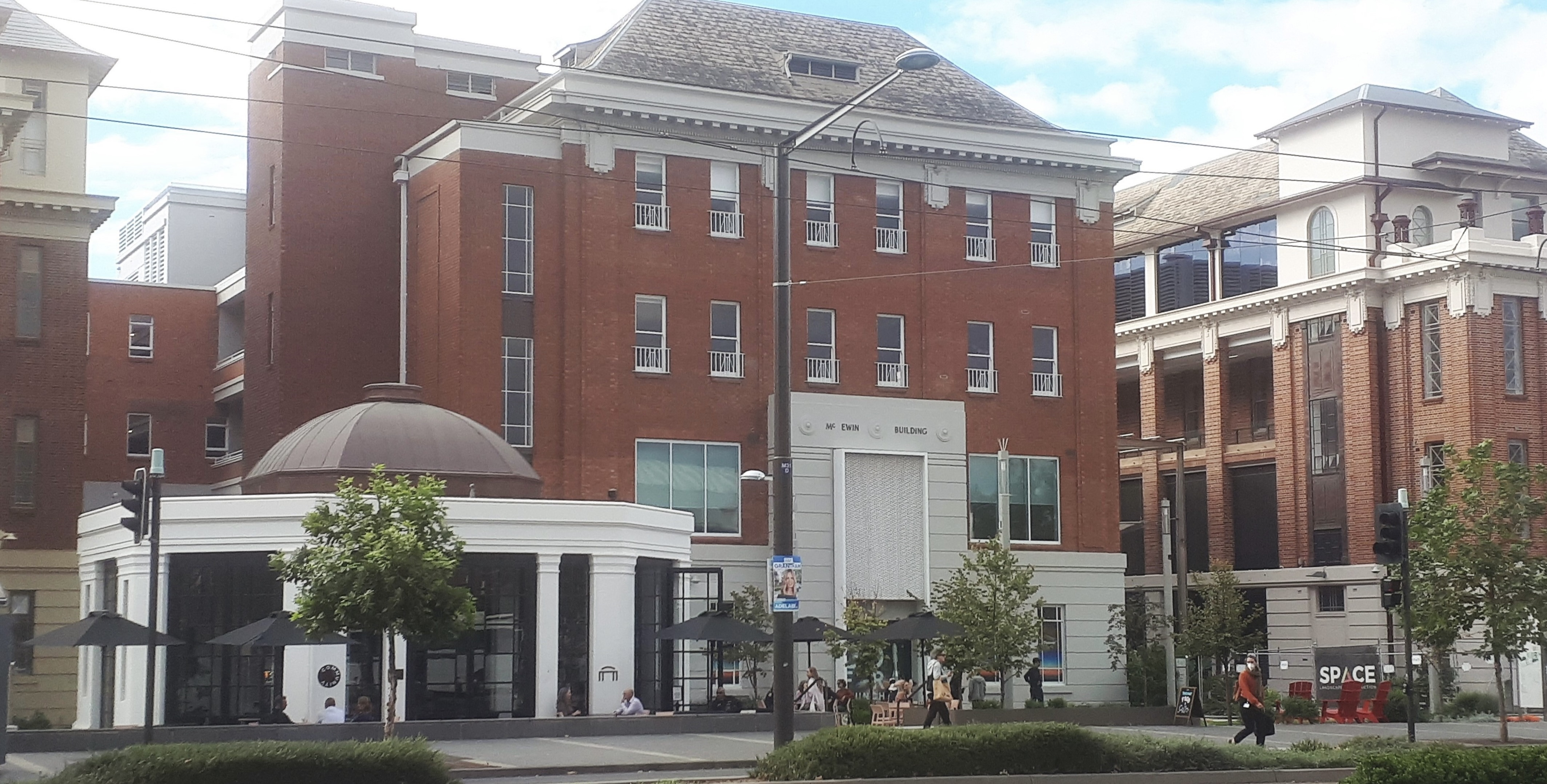
The national headquarters of the Australian Space Agency adjacent to the university

As of October 2024 the university was a member of the Australian Technology Network, a coalition of technology-focussed Australian universities, but was expected to join the Group of Eight following its merger with the University of Adelaide. It was a close partner with the Australian Space Agency, whose national headquarters is located adjacently on Lot Fourteen, and its City East campus formed part of the Adelaide BioMed City research precinct. The Mawson Lakes campus was also adjacent to the Adelaide Technology Park which is home to the Australian offices of Lockheed Martin, Raytheon, Northrop Grumman, General Dynamics, Saab among other multinational companies in the space and defence technology sectors.

It also offered some degree programs in Brisbane and Hong Kong as part of a joint ventures with local institutions.

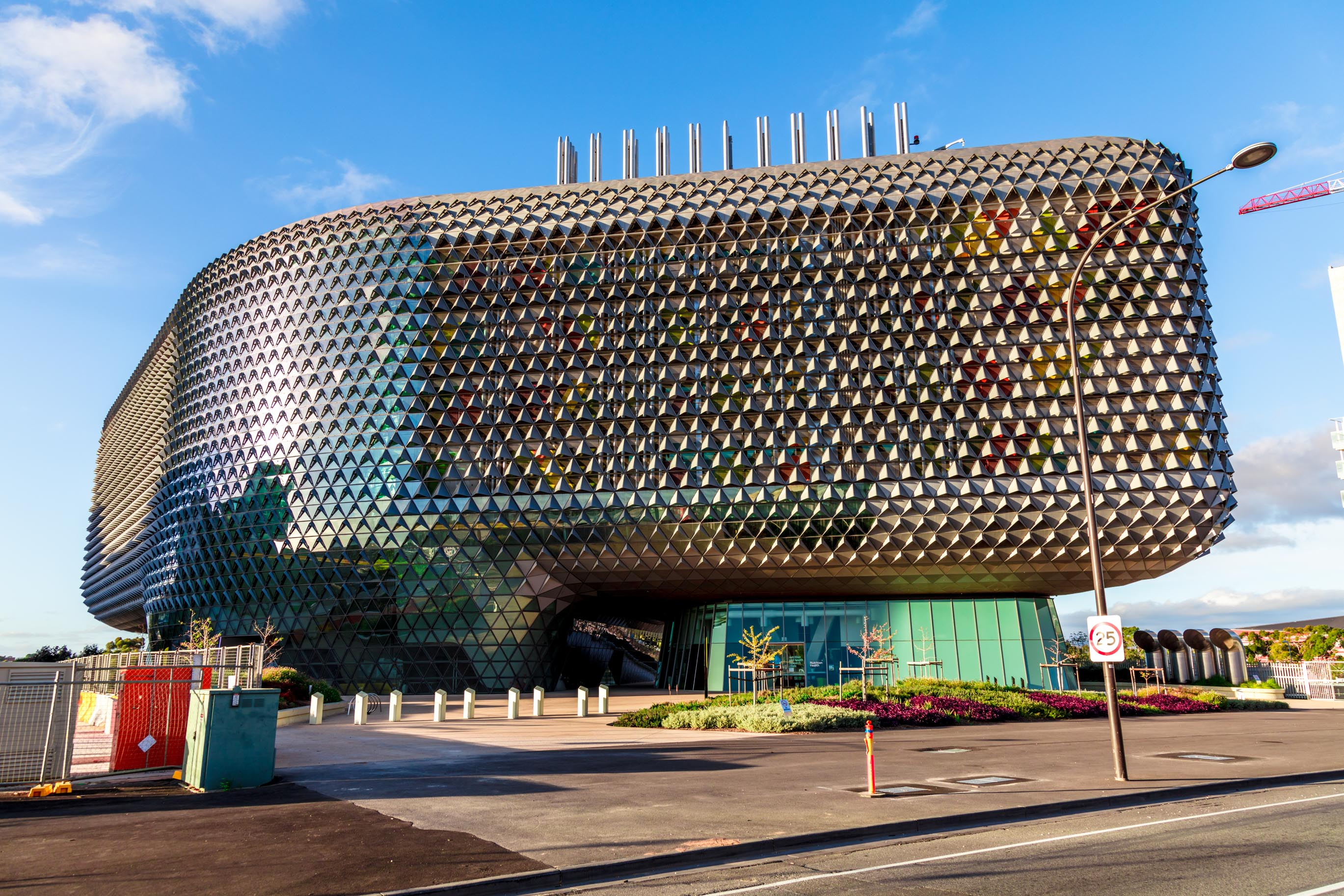
South Australian Health and Medical Research Institute

=== Research and publications ===
In the 2018 ERA National Report, the Australian Research Council evaluated work produced between 2014 and 2018. 100 per cent of the university's research activity was judged to be "at or above world standard" (3-5*).

=== Research institutes ===
The university operated a number of disciplinary-specific research institutes and centres in partnership with other research institutions and private enterprises. Notable examples included:

- Future Industries Institute
- Ehrenberg-Bass Institute for Marketing Science
- Sansom Institute for Health Research

== Libraries and archives ==
There were five libraries located across five campuses, excluding Mount Gambier.

=== Bob Hawke Prime Ministerial Library ===
The Bob Hawke Prime Ministerial Library was the prime ministerial library of Bob Hawke, who served as Prime Minister of Australia from 1983 until 1991. Established in 1997, it was the first of its kind in the world to be founded during the lifetime of a prime minister. The library, located in the Hawke Building since its construction in 2007, was expanded following Hawke's death in 2019.

The Bob Hawke Collection forms the bulk of its archives, and includes a large collection of his notes, personal papers, state gifts, biographical texts, newspaper extracts, photographs, political comics, articles, recordings and transcripts of speeches and media events, including documents from ministers from his cabinet. Notable artefacts held at the library include a hide belt gifted by former President Ronald Reagan, the jacket he wore to the 1983 America's Cup celebrations, a replica of a Panther Model 100 motorcycle that he crashed as a university student, and several prime ministerial briefcases.

=== Other libraries ===
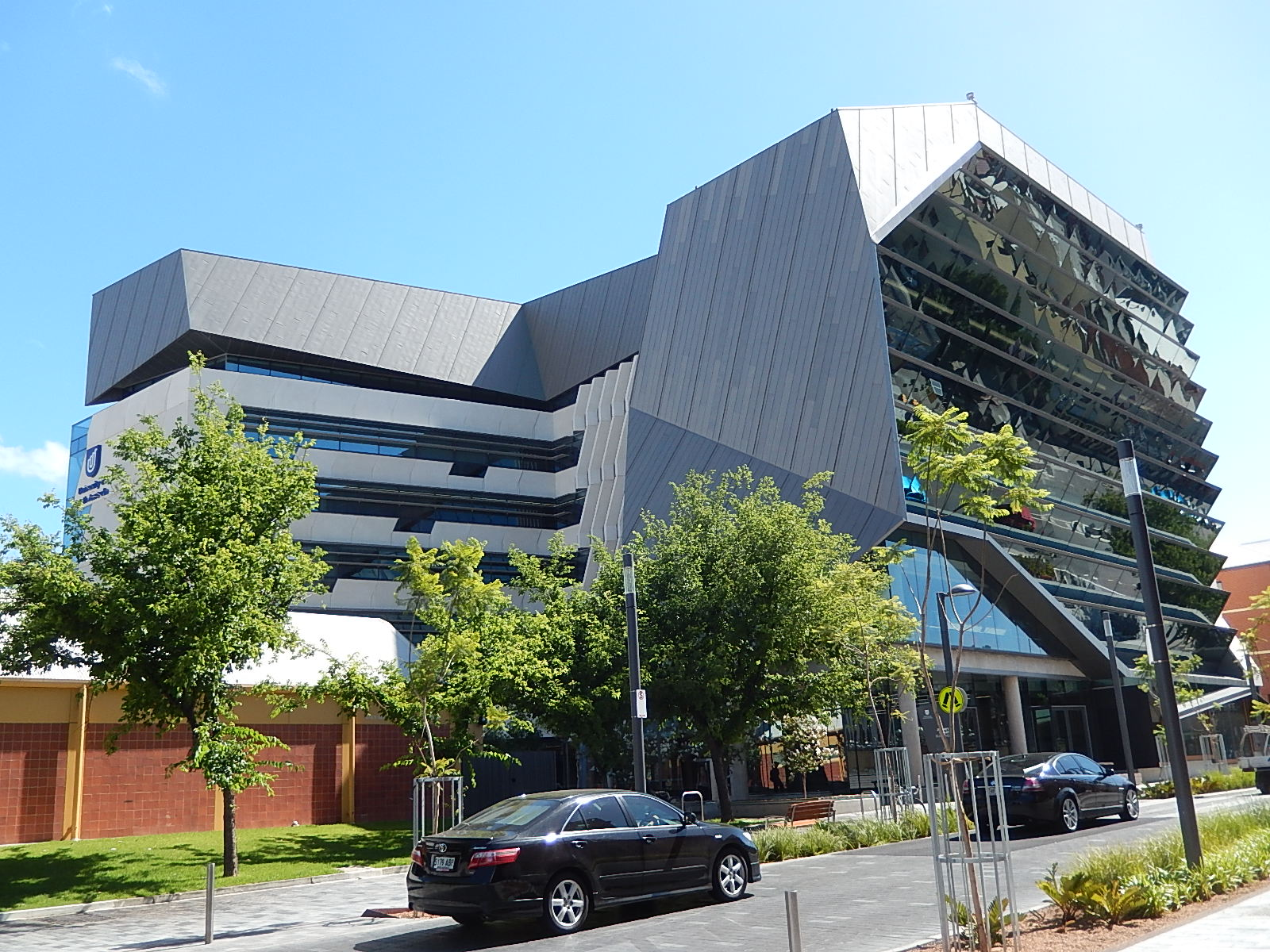
The Jeffrey Smart Building includes staff and student spaces and the east end library

Established in 1903, the David Murray Library was located in the Brookman Building. It is named after Scottish-born merchant and politician David Murray who donated £2000 towards the library.

The Jeffrey Smart Building, named after artist Jeffrey Smart, located on the east end of North Terrace, contains the main library. It consisted of "open plan" teaching and learning spaces and a central green common area.

The Mawson Lakes and Magill campuses also had their own libraries.

== Museums, galleries, and exhibition spaces ==
The university was home to several museums, galleries and other exhibitions. These include:

=== MOD. ===
MOD. (Museum of Discovery) is described as "a futuristic museum of discovery" featuring exhibitions designed by researchers to showcase "how research shapes our understanding of the world around us to inform our futures". It is located in the Bradley Building.

=== Samstag Museum of Art ===
The Samstag Museum of Art is a contemporary art gallery located at the Hawke Building. Established in 2007, its history dates back to 1977 as the College Gallery. It is named after Anne and Gordon Samstag and is located at the Hawke Building.

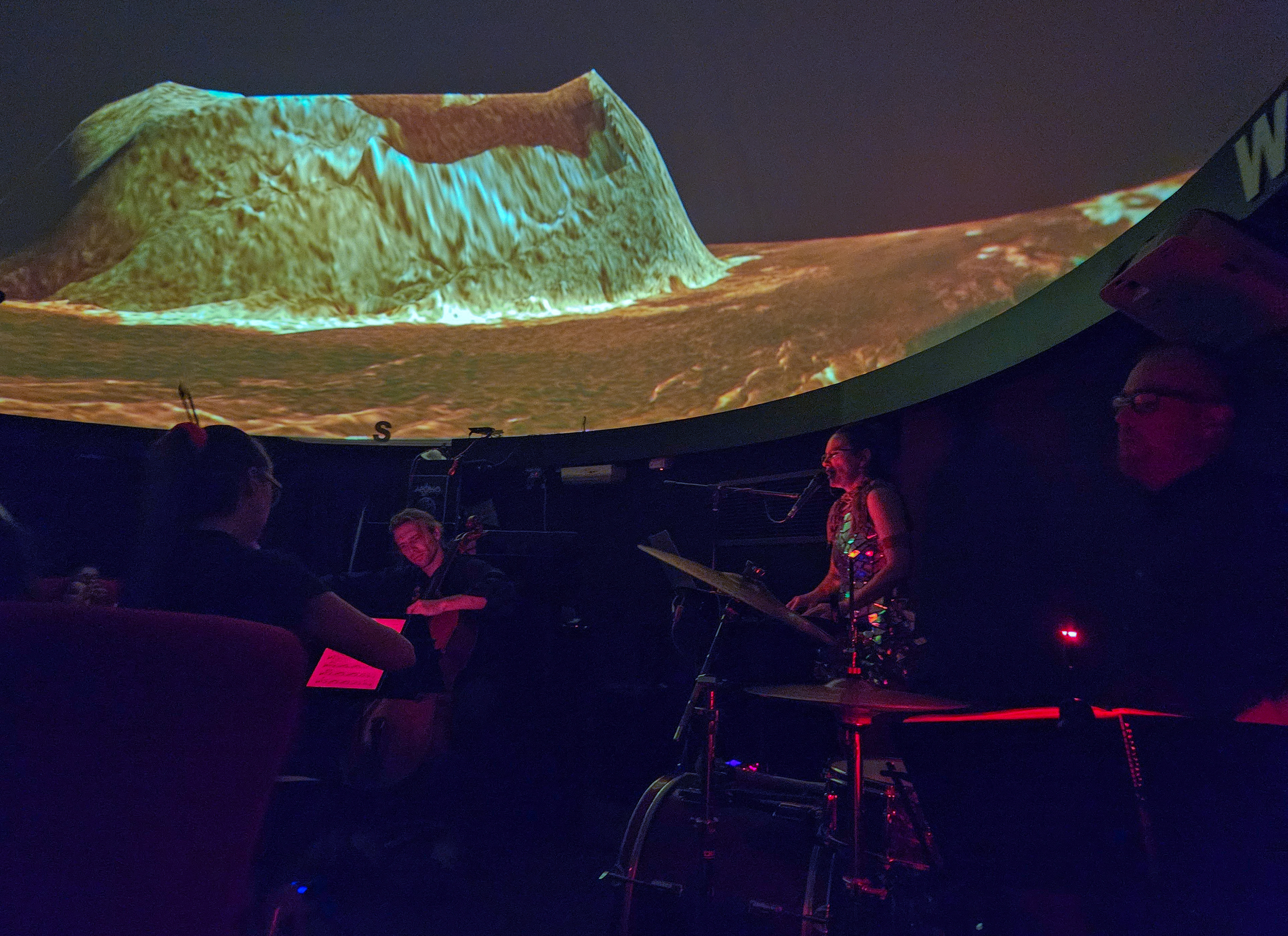
The K Mak at the Planetarium exhibition at the Adelaide Planetarium in 2024

=== Adelaide Planetarium ===
Constructed in 1972, the Adelaide Planetarium is a planetarium at the Mawson Lakes campus. It hosts public exhibitions and short courses that are open to the public.

=== Architecture Museum ===
The Architecture Museum includes a collection of 400,000 items including drawings, photographs, correspondence, photographs and personal papers mostly donated by architects who worked in the state during the 20th century. It is also a library comprising books, journal articles, research and other literature. It was formally established in 2005, though the collection has been available to the public since the 1990s. Its early collection was donated by Donald Leslie Johnson, an architecture historian and curator, who began collecting the works in the 1970s due to a lack of a repository in the state. The museum, which also conducts research in the field of architecture and the built environment, is located in the Kaurna Building.

=== Other exhibitions ===
The SASA Gallery showcases creative works by students and researchers. It is located in the Kaurna Building. It is the modern descendant of the SA School of Art (SASA) established in 1856.

The Bob Hawke Prime Ministerial Centre and Kerry Packer Civic Gallery have exhibitions that change regularly.

== Other sub-units and events ==
=== Innovation Collaboration Centre ===
The Innovation Collaboration Centre was the university's startup incubator. The incubator provided the Venture Catalyst General, Space and Social Enterprise programs for students and the community to build early-stage startup companies. The incubator offered office space, mentoring, access to industry experts, workshops, university resources and funding to companies accepted into the program.

=== Lecture series ===
==== Annual Hawke Lecture ====
The Annual Hawke Lecture was inaugurated by Bob Hawke on Tuesday 12 May 1998. Since then, the lecture has been held each year by a range of eminent speakers from many walks of life, including World Bank managing director Mamphela Ramphele (2000), Indigenous leader Noel Pearson (2002), Justice Michael Kirby (2007), New Zealand governor Silvia Cartwright (2011), scientist Elizabeth Blackburn (2013), former prime minister Julia Gillard (2017), journalist Stan Grant (2018), immunologist Peter Doherty (2022), foreign minister Penny Wong (2024), and ASIO chief Mike Burgess (2025). Many of the lectures have been presented at Adelaide Town Hall. The 2025 event was held at the Adelaide Convention Centre.

The lecture series is presented by The Hawke Centre, and is described as "an opportunity to listen to the views of someone whose experience of human affairs is notable, and whose concerns about our world are truly worthy of consideration", with lectures covering topics "from the environment to human rights to science".

==== Nelson Mandela Lectures ====
The UniSA Nelson Mandela Lecture series, was an occasional event presented by the Bob Hawke Prime Ministerial Centre. The series was established in 2008 in honour of former South African president Nelson Mandela, who served as the Hawke Centre's inaugural international patron from 2001 to 2013. Mandela Mandela appreciated that Hawke's actions against the apartheid regime as key to his release from prison. The lecture series seeks to promote the concepts of human rights, freedom, truth and reconciliation in life and public affairs.

The inaugural Nelson Mandela Lecture was given by Musimbi Kanyoro in 2008, with following lectures given in 2009, 2010, 2012, 2014, 2015, 2016, 2017, 2018, 2019, and 2022, when former Socceroo and human rights advocate Craig Foster delivered the address.

== Academic reputation ==
University rankings

Global – Overall
- ARWU World: 401–500 (2025)
- CWTS World: 564 (Note: The CWTS Leiden Ranking is based on P (top 10%).) (2024)
- QS World: =340 (2025)
- QS Employability: 301–500 (2022)
- THE World: 301–350 (2025)
- USNWR Global: =424 (25/26)

National – Overall
- ARWU National: 21–24 (2025)
- CWTS National: 23 (2024)
- ERA National: 24 (2018)
- QS National: 22 (2025)
- THE National: 20–24 (2025)
- USNWR National: 24 (25/26)
- AFR National: =10 (2025)

In the 2024 Aggregate Ranking of Top Universities, which measures aggregate performance across the QS, THE and ARWU rankings, the university attained a position of #313 (22nd nationally).

=== National publications ===
In the Australian Financial Review Best Universities Ranking 2025, the university was tied #10 amongst Australian universities.

=== Global publications ===
In the 2025 Quacquarelli Symonds World University Rankings (published 2024), the university attained a tied position of #340 (22nd nationally).

In the Times Higher Education World University Rankings 2025 (published 2024), the university attained a position of #301–350 (tied 20–24th nationally).

In the 2025 Academic Ranking of World Universities, the university attained a position of #401–500 (tied 21–24th nationally).

In the 2025–2026 U.S. News & World Report Best Global Universities, the university attained a tied position of #424 (24th nationally).

In the CWTS Leiden Ranking 2024, the university attained a position of #564 (23rd nationally).

== Student life ==
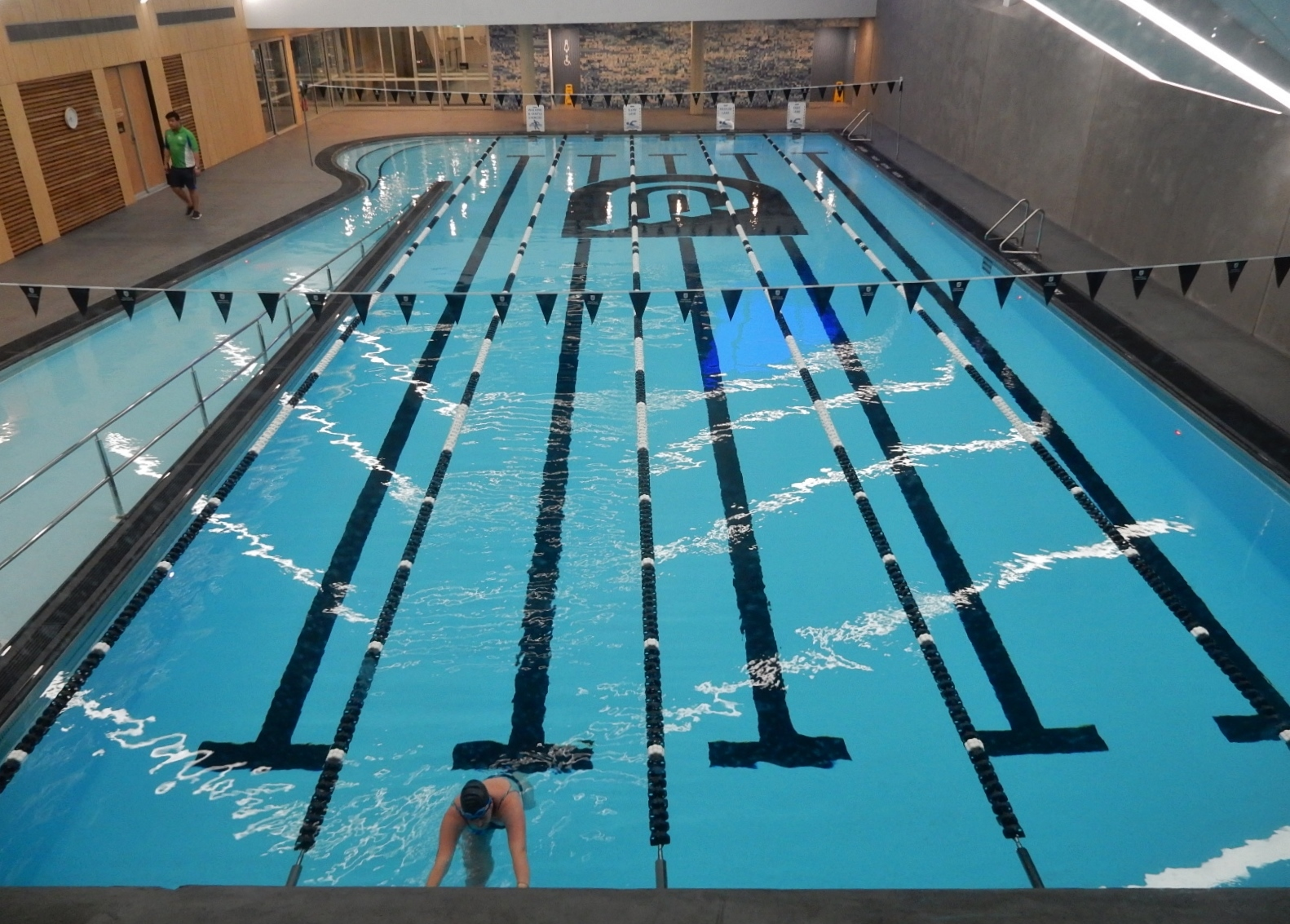
Pridham Hall is a gymnasium and multi-sport facility

=== Sports and athletics ===
Founded in 2013, UniSA Sport had 28 sports clubs and competes as Team UniSA. It includes several clubs that predate the university. This includes its hockey club which was affiliated with the antecedent South Australian Institute of Technology since 1970.

=== Student union ===
The University of South Australia Student Association (USASA, formerly UniLife) was a democratic organisation run by students. The association operated both as the representative voice for university students and as a provider of a wide range of services. The union also supported a range of services, including 71 clubs and societies, social events and an advice service.

=== Student magazine ===
The USASA produced the Verse Magazine which was established in 2014 and has an annual print run of 12,000 copies. The two magazine published artwork and written pieces including creative writing, essays, opinion pieces, photography, poetry and visual art.

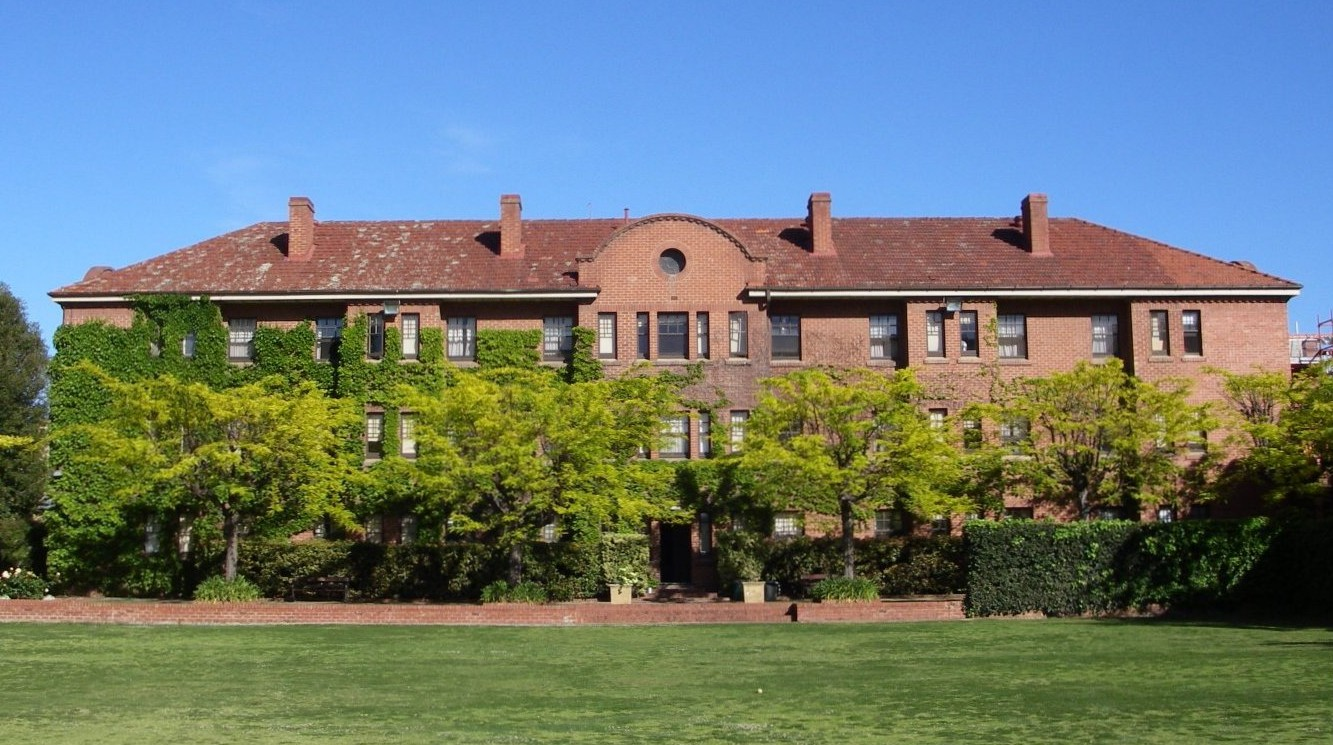
Newland Building of St Mark's College, one of several private residential colleges

=== Residential colleges ===
St Mark's College was founded in 1925 by the Anglican Diocese of Adelaide and is the oldest of the colleges. It was developed by some former residents of the Universities of Oxford and Cambridge among others with the goal of developing a similar collegiate lifestyle.

Aquinas College was founded as a men's college in 1950 by the Catholic Church at Montefiore House, the former residence of Samuel Way. It later expanded to surrounding sites and became co-residential in 1975.

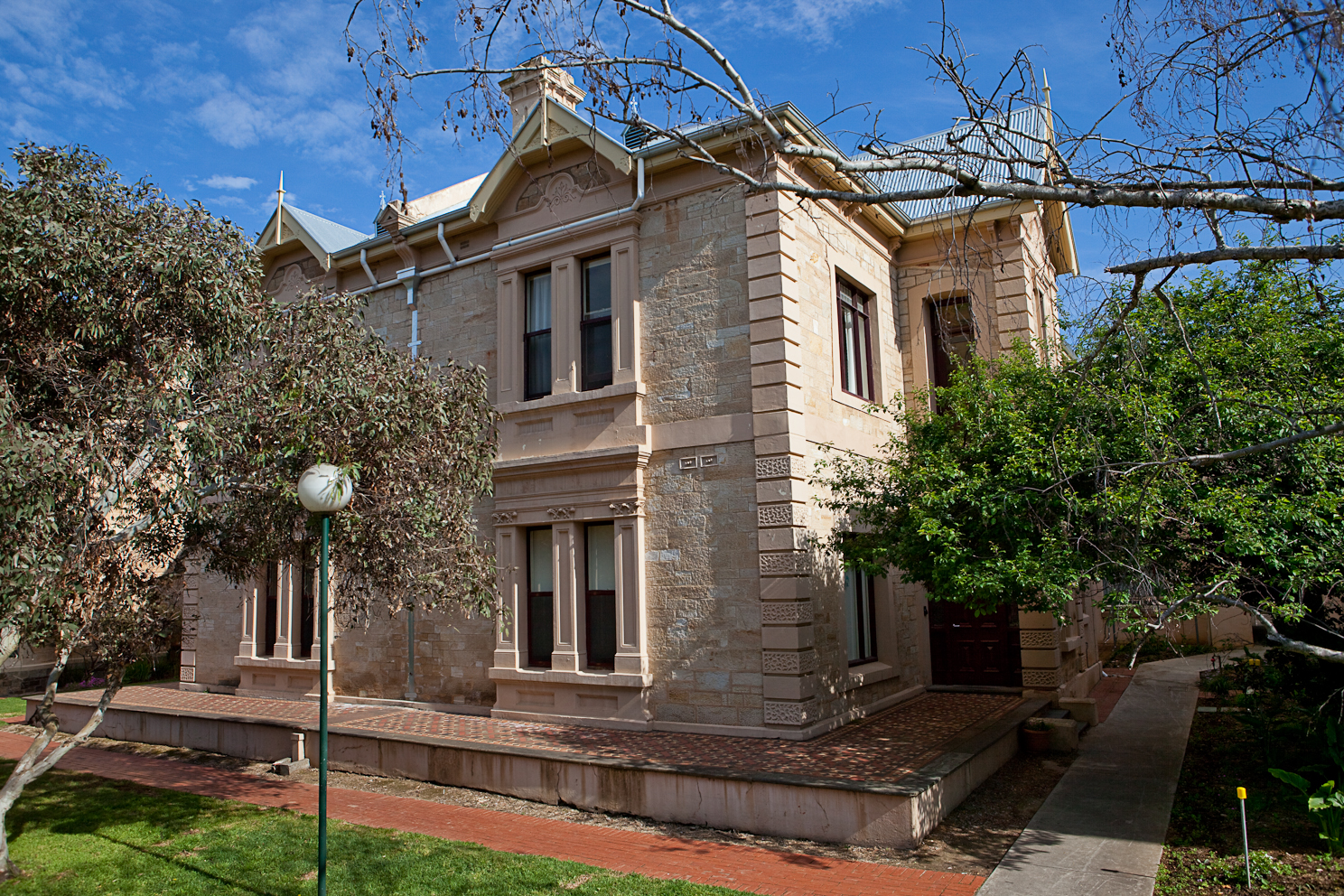
Abraham House, one of several heritage buildings that are part of Lincoln College

Lincoln College was founded in 1952 by the Methodist Church and named after the Lincoln College at the University of Oxford. Originally established as a men's college, it became co-residential in 1973. It features several heritage-listed buildings.

St Ann's College was founded as a women's college in 1947. The college's honorary founder is politician Josiah Symon who in 1924 suggested that female students should have somewhere to live. It became co-educational in 1973.

There were also other private student accommodation providers in the city centre and near other campuses. Additionally, Whyalla campus manages its own student village.

== Notable alumni and staff ==
The University of South Australia's alumni also includes students from the two antecedent institutions and their predecessors.

Notable alumni of the university include the incumbent foreign affairs minister Penny Wong, the Human Rights Watch director Tirana Hassan, the founding editor-in-chief of Vogue China Angelica Cheung, former state premier Steven Marshall and retired politician Christopher Pyne.

Notable alumni of the university include:

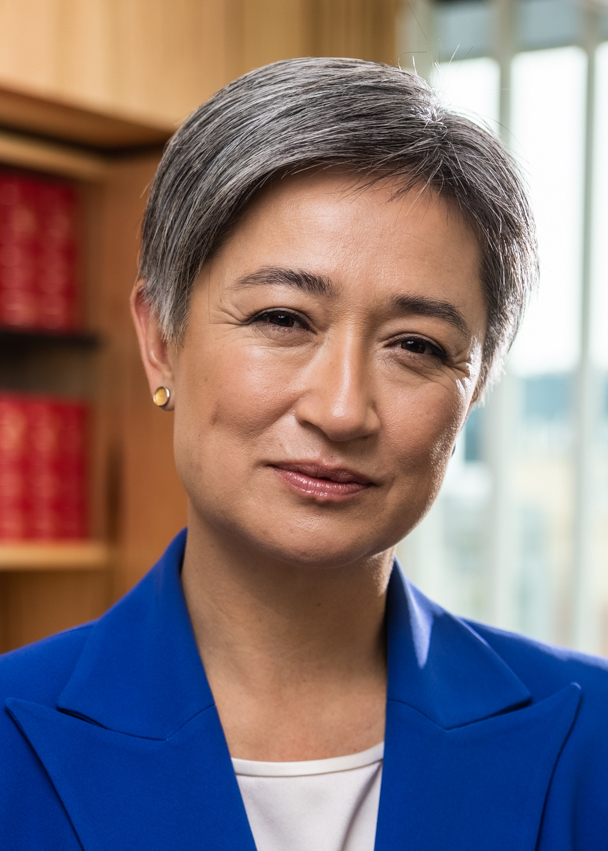
Penny Wong
Current Minister for Foreign Affairs and senate leader

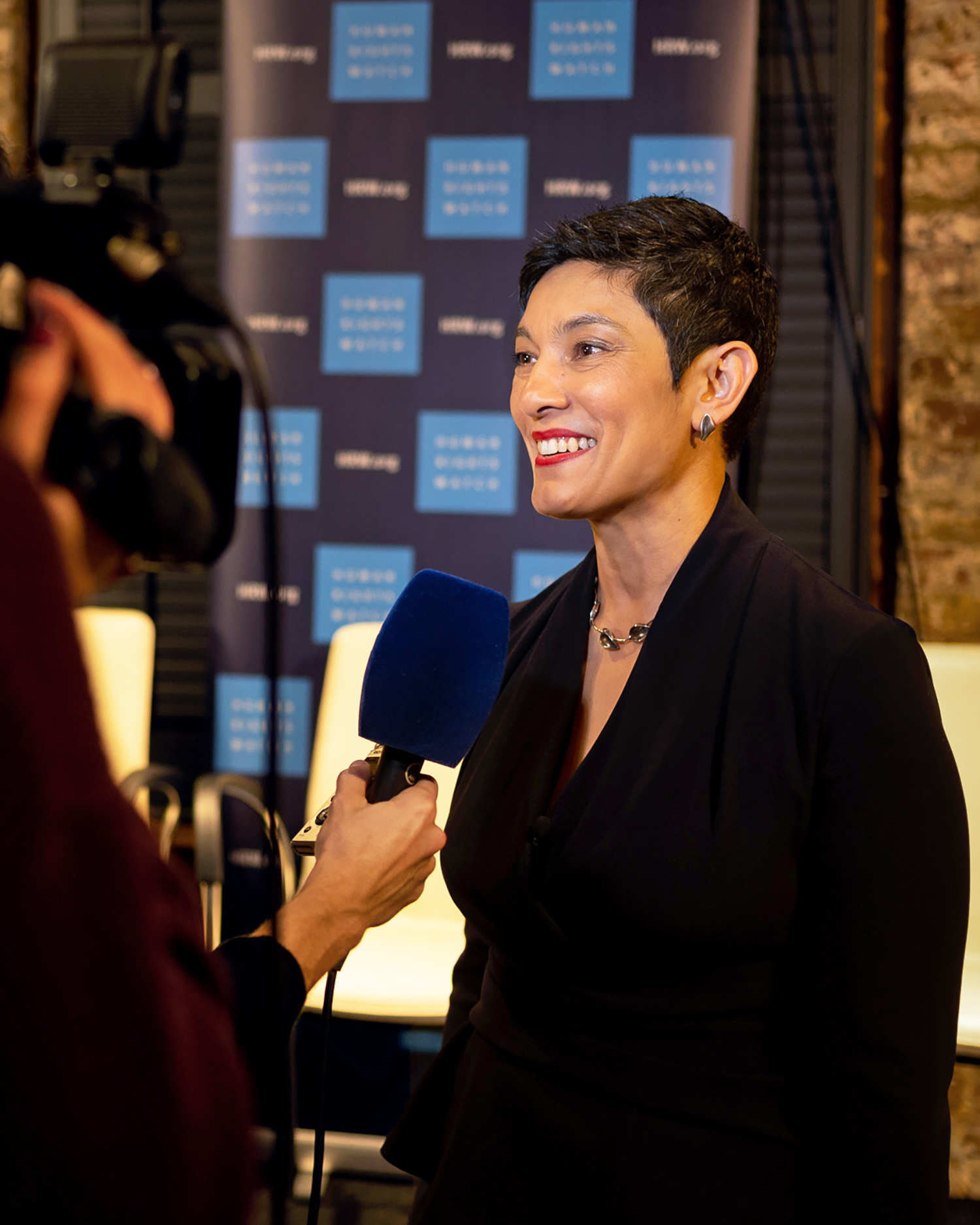
Tirana Hassan
Executive director of Human Rights Watch

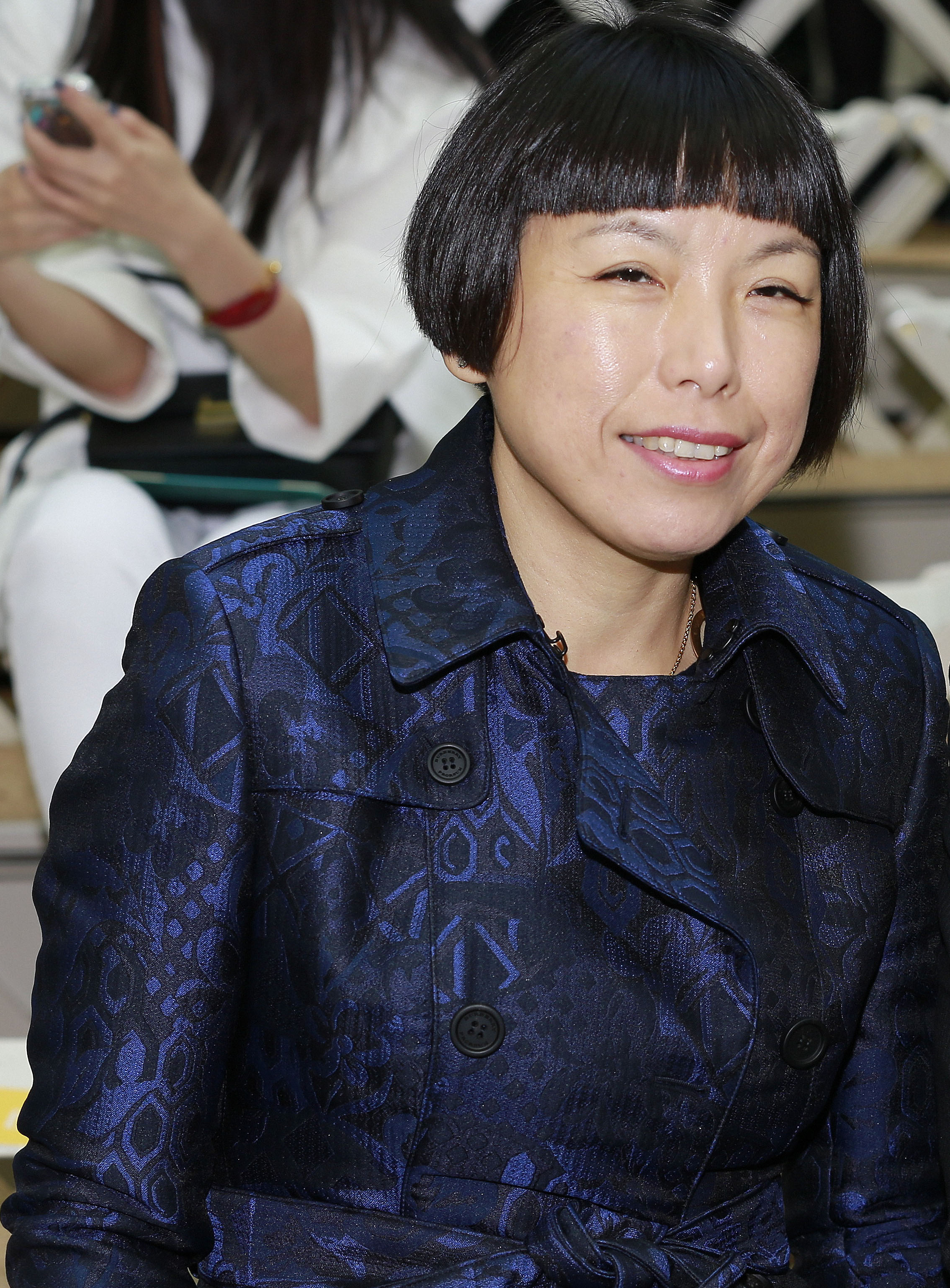
Angelica Cheung
Founding editor-in-chief of Vogue China

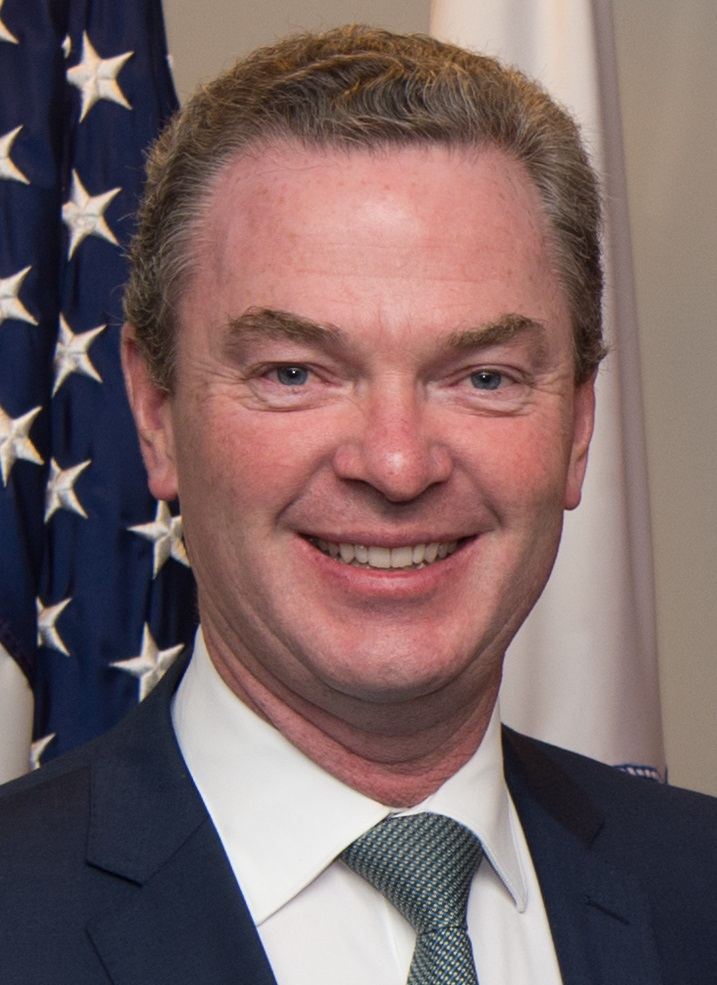
Christopher Pyne
Former federal politician with portfolio

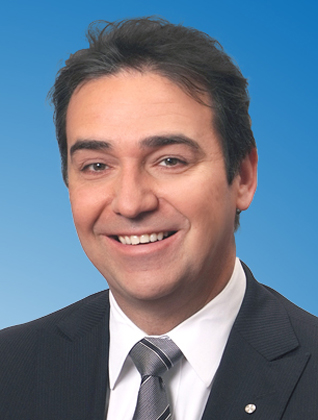
Steven Marshall
46th Premier of South Australia

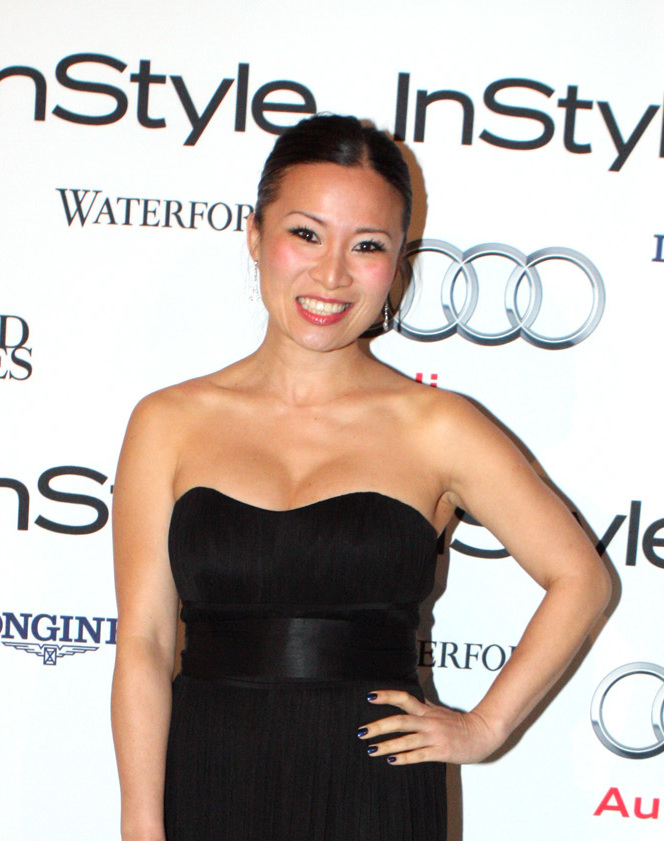
Poh Ling Yeow
Celebrity chef

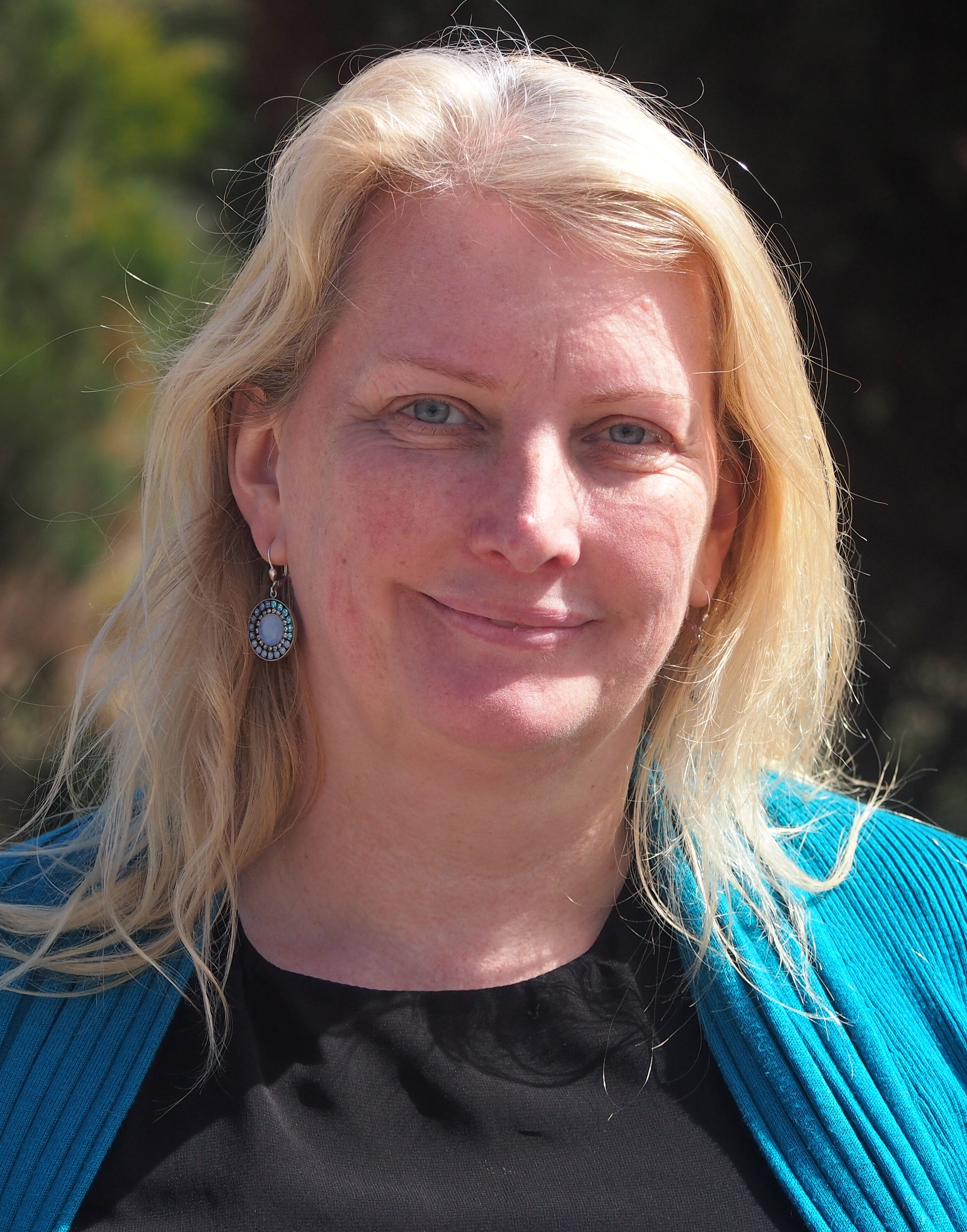
Tammy Franks
Leader of the SA Greens

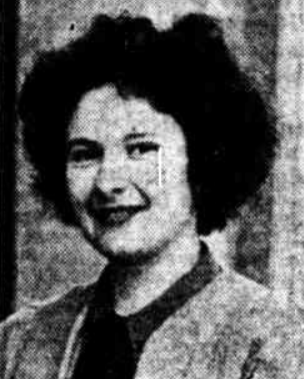
Beverley Bolin
First female architect in South Australia

== Controversies ==
=== Initial merger discussions ===
The University of South Australia and the University of Adelaide had previously engaged to discuss a merger in 2018 but failed due to disagreements from the latter about the post-merger leadership structure.

=== Opinion polling on staff ===
The National Tertiary Education Union SA conducted a survey of 1,100 university staff and found that three-quarters of respondents were against the merger. In addition, the state government has been accused of coercing the universities to agree to merge, indicating that a commission of inquiry would be established to find ways to compel the two universities to merge had their councils refused to do so, with less financial support available.

Andrew Miller, the state secretary of the union, raised concerns that staff were under "extreme psychosocial pressure" to meet the 2026 launch deadline. Backing his claims with communications from the Integration Management Office staff responsible for merging the two institutions, he added that the "Game of Thrones" perception among staff competing "for the final spots of the new Adelaide University" was causing tensions, breakdowns and disharmony. The institutions' vice-chancellors David Lloyd and Peter Høj criticised the claims, referring to them as "whispers of Little Birds or Littlefingers", though they had previously admitted that the "two-by-two approach across the board" was "not as linear as first conceived".

In 2025, a FOI document obtained by The Australian found an increase in bullying and harassment reports at the University of Adelaide following the announcement of the merger. It added concerns from staff that the merger would result in a "meat grinder producing poorly educated students" that would be seen as "walking dollar signs".

The post-merger plan to switch to a trimester academic calendar has also been criticised by the union whose internal poll showed that more than 4 in 5 members were against the move.

=== Land re-development ===
In February 2024, the State Government drew criticism for its plans to convert land it had purchased from two University of South Australia campuses for housing and commercial re-development. As part of the merger agreement, the land was to be sold to the South Australian Government for A$114.5 million and leased back to the university for a period of up to 10 years. Following the release of several internal FOI documents retrieved by InDaily from the Premier's Office, it was later revealed that the land was "earmarked for future development" for residential and commercial purposes.

The original media release replaced the phrase with "short-term transitional lease to university", referring to the leaseback period of 10 years, following concerns from UniSA vice-chancellor David Lloyd that the original draft would "create enormous community reaction which will be particularly unhelpful at this time". The land sales account for the entirety of the Magill campus and approximately 50% of the Mawson Lakes campus.

== Tram stop ==
The university is served by two stops on the Glenelg tram line, University and City West, which connects the City East and City West campuses respectively along North Terrace.

Preceding station	Adelaide Metro	Following station
Art Gallery towards Adelaide Entertainment Centre	Glenelg tram line	Botanic Gardens Terminus

== See also ==
- List of universities in Australia
- Australian Technology Network
- Dawkins Revolution
- Innovation Collaboration Centre
- Education in Australia
- South Australian School of Art
- Samstag Museum of Art
