= ThincLab =

Startup incubator run by University of Adelaide

- Industry: Startup incubator
- Headquarters: Adelaide, South Australia
- Parent: ~~University of Adelaide~~; Adelaide University
- Website: adelaide.edu.au/partners-and-community/thinclab/

ThincLab is a network of startup incubators created by the former University of Adelaide in South Australia, the University of Canterbury in Christchurch, New Zealand, and other partners, including Primary Industries and Regions SA.

The ThincLab main offices are in Pulteney Street, in Adelaide city centre. Other locations include the Waite Campus of Adelaide University, in the Adelaide suburb of Urrbrae; Loxton in the Riverland of South Australia; Singapore; Christchurch, New Zealand; and France.

The incubator supports startups in several industries, including agricultural technology, space industry, social enterprise, the food industry, and high-tech.

Startups assisted by ThincLab include:

- Inovor Technologies, which launched the first Australian-built satellite in over 15 years
- Taboo, which makes sanitary products for women
- Taste Studios, manufacturer of branded food products for businesses

== See also ==
- Lot Fourteen
- Innovation Collaboration Centre
