= C. T. C. de Crespigny =

Australian medical practitioner (1882–1952)

Sir Constantine Trent Champion de Crespigny, DSO, VD (pron. də kre'pəni) (5 March 1882 – 27 October 1952), generally referred to as C. T. C. de Crespigny or Sir Trent de Crespigny or Trent Champion de Crespigny, was a medical doctor, clinical pathologist, academic and hospital administrator in Adelaide, South Australia.

Constantine Trent Champion de Crespigny about 1940

== Family ==
The Champion de Crespigny family is of the French nobility, descending from the Huguenot Claude Champion de Crespigny (1620-1695), Sieur de Crespigny, whose three sons became free denizens of England by Act of Parliament, passed 5 March 1690.

Constantine Trent Champion de Crespigny, known as "Trent", was born on 5 March 1882 in Queenscliff, Victoria (at that time spelled Queenscliffe), second son of Philip Champion de Crespigny (1850-1927), general manager of the Bank of Victoria (which became the Commercial Banking Company of Sydney), and Annie Frances (1857-1883), née Chauncy. His brothers were:

- Philip Champion de Crespigny (1879 – 1918).
- Dr. Francis George Travers "Frank" Champion de Crespigny (1892 – 1968) of Ararat, Victoria.
- Air Vice Marshal Hugh Vivian Champion de Crespigny (1897 – 1969), C.B., D.F.C., M.C., Croix de Guerre Royal Air Force.
- Royalieu Dana "Roy" Champion de Crespigny (1905 – 1985),
- Group Captain Claude Montgomery Champion de Crespigny, C.B.E. (1908– 1991), Royal Air Force.

His grandfather, police magistrate Philip Robert Champion de Crespigny (1817–1889), was great-nephew of Sir Claude Champion de Crespigny, 1st Baronet.

=== Marriages ===
Trent de Crespigny was married to Beatrice/Beatrix Hughes (1884 – 1943) on 11 September 1906 at St. John's Church of England, Beaufort, Victoria, in a ceremony conducted by Right Rev. Arthur Vincent Green, Anglican Bishop of Ballarat, and Rev. Charles Reed, the Vicar of St. John's. She was a noted worker for Mothers' and Babies' Health Association (MBHA) and other charities. They had two sons and two daughters.

- Col. (Richard) Geoffrey "Geoff" Champion de Crespigny M.B.. B.S (Melb.), O.B.E. (1907 – 1966) married Kathleen Cavenagh Mainwaring Cudmore (1908 – 2013), daughter of Sir Arthur Cudmore, in 1933.

- Kathleen re-married to George William Symes (1896–1980) in 1967.

- Nancy de Crespigny (1910 – 2003) married Hallam Movius (1907 – 1987) in London in 1936. Both were archaeologists; Hallam served with US military in WWII; by 1953 was a professor at Harvard University
- Margaret "Peggy" de Crespigny (1919 – 1989) served with Signals Unit during WWII, married Cornelis "Kees" in't Veld (1908 - 1994) in 1946, lived Rangoon, Voorburg, Netherlands, Karachi, Pakistan and later settling in Melbourne
- Adrian Norman Champion de Crespigny (1919 – 1993 ) a twin, he suffered brain injury from birth.

Sir Trent de Crespigny married his second wife, Mary Birks Jolley (1915 – 1994), a "music through movement" teacher of "Rendlesham", Wentworth, NSW on 13 December 1945, quietly at the Lady Chapel, St Peter's Cathedral, Adelaide.
Mary was a qualified exponent of the Dalcroze method of music education in recognition of her "long and faithful work" with Heather Gell, and on the recommendation of Anne Addison, principal of the Kindergarten Training College in Adelaide. She was a Licentiate of Music, Australia; a Licentiate of the Royal Schools of Music, London; and a member of the Australian Music Examinations Board. She lectured in music education at the Kindergarten College, was a supervisor of music in the Kindergarten Union kindergartens. She also ran eurhythmics classes at several private secondary schools and at Adelaide High School.
They had one daughter, Charlotte Francis de Crespigny (1948 – 2024), a professor in the field of drug and alcohol nursing at the University of Adelaide.

== Education ==
He was educated at Brighton Grammar School, then enrolled as a medical student at Trinity College, University of Melbourne. He graduated Bachelor of Medicine (M.B.) in 1903, Bachelor of Surgery (B.S.) in 1904, and Doctor of Medicine (M.D.) in 1906.

== Early career ==
In 1903, he was appointed resident medical officer at Melbourne Hospital, and later at the Women's Hospital. In 1907, he began private practice in Western Victoria, then in Fitzroy, Victoria, and also served as honorary physician to St Vincent's Hospital. In 1908, de Crespigny was appointed medical superintendent of the Adelaide Hospital, and four years later returned to private practice with rooms on North Terrace, at the time Adelaide's equivalent to Harley Street, London or Macquarie Street, Sydney. He became a hospital "honorary," and also lectured in pathology at the University of Adelaide. In 1913, he continued, in addition, as Director of the South Australian Government Bacteriological and Pathological Laboratory.

== Military service ==
Captain de Crespigny joined the 31st Light Horse Field Ambulance, Citizens Military Force, and was promoted lieutenant colonel in January 1913, captain (provisional) in January 1914, and major in January 1915. He joined the Australian Imperial Force for service in the First World War and as Lieutenant Colonel de Crespigny left South Australia on 20 May 1915 aboard RMS Mooltan, bound for Alexandria, Egypt, where he would serve as registrar and secretary of the 3rd Australian General Hospital.

De Crespigny left Egypt for Gallipoli in August 1915, then on 28 September to the army hospital at Mudros, on Lemnos, where he served as second in command. From there to Alexandria on 27 January 1916 and Heliopolis 20 February, Marseille in April, then put in charge of the 1st Australian General Hospital at Rouen, where he was mentioned in despatches while under command of General Sir Charles Monro. He spent much of the period 6 November 1916 to 3 March 1917 in hospital suffering cholecystitis. He returned to command at Rouen as temporary colonel and was mentioned in despatches 9 June 1917 by Sir Douglas Haig and was recommended for the Distinguished Service Order. He was again hospitalised, from 2 to 12 August 1917, and on 18 September promoted to colonel. He was transferred to London headquarters on 13 October and returned to Australia on 1 November, where he was "struck off strength".

De Crespigny re-enlisted on 25 June 1918 and left aboard SS Gaika on 6 August, disembarking in London on 13 October, where he served as consulting physician at AIF headquarters. He left for Australia on 16 March 1919, and with Lieutenant Colonel Cudmore and Colonel Michael "Mick" Downey transshipped to Dunluce Castle at Alexandria on 7 April, arrived in Adelaide on 13 May, and his appointment was terminated 28 May. While in England he was admitted as a member of the Royal College of Physicians.

== Return to civilian life ==
de Crespigny returned to his previous life as a university lecturer, physician, and hospital administrator:

- On 7 January 1923 he delivered the first-ever treatment with Adelaide-produced insulin to a 9-years-old diabetic boy; and on 31 January 1923 he delivered the first-ever treatment to a diabetic adult with Adelaide-produced insulin.
- In 1923 he succeeded Harry Swift as lecturer in medicine at the University of Adelaide.
- In 1927 he was appointed to the Hospital advisory board on the resignation of Bronte Smeaton.
- In December 1928 he succeeded Dr. William Ray as Dean of the Faculty of Medicine, University of Adelaide.
- He was largely responsible for creation of the Institute of Medical and Veterinary Science (IMVS), for which the foundation stone was laid in August 1937 and opened May 1939. He was the board's first chairman.
- The memorial plaque to Sir Joseph Verco in the Frome Road building was instituted at de Crespigny's instigation.
- He was appointed to the Royal Adelaide Hospital Advisory Committee in 1940.
- He was vice-president of the South Australian Council of Speech Science and Speech Therapy from its foundation in August 1947.
- He was president of the Royal Australasian College of Physicians 1942–43, succeeded by Harold Ritchie of New South Wales.
- In 1945 he was sent to the US to investigate retraining of American battlefield doctors to civilian practices.

== Residence ==
de Crespigny had a home at 12 Strangways Terrace, North Adelaide and from 1934 or earlier a (summer ?) residence "St Barberie", now at 9 Blackburn Drive, Crafers, but before subdivision on a much larger property. The house was built for Samuel Tomkinson, who named it "Mangona". close to Summit Road. It narrowly escaped total destruction in the 1943 bushfire.

== Publications ==
During the 1920s he wrote a medical column for the South Australian Register which was edited by the young journalist Elizabeth Auld.

He spent six months in the USA (in mid-1945) on behalf of the University of Adelaide, investigating "the post-graduate education and [the] rehabilitation of medical officers discharged from the services"; and, whilst there, he contributed a number of detailed articles on his experiences, insights, and observations on the subject to the Adelaide Advertiser. He also contributed notable articles to medical and scientific publications.

== Recognition ==
- 1917: He was awarded a Distinguished Service Order in the 1917 Birthday Honours list.
- 1927: He was awarded a Colonial Auxiliary Forces Officers' Decoration in 1927. It was presented to him, by Sir Tom Bridges, the Governor of South Australia, at a ceremony on the Adelaide Oval on 25 April 1927.
- 1941: A knighthood was conferred on him in the 1941 New Year Honours.
- 1953: His portrait, c. 1951 by Ivor Hele, hung in the foyer of the Institute of Medical and Veterinary Science, now SA Pathology, Frome Road, Adelaide.

== Death ==
de Crespigny had suffered from heart trouble for a long time: a condition that had been accepted by the Totally and Permanently Incapacitated board as related to his war service. Having spent some time in hospital, he died (aged 70) at his Adelaide Hills home, on 27 October 1952, of hypertensive cardio-vascular disease.

== See also ==
- "Insulin" and the University of Adelaide
