= Arthur Cudmore =

Australian surgeon and academic

CMG FRCS Arthur Cudmore
- Born: Arthur Murray Cudmore; 11 June 1870; Paringa, Australia
- Died: 27 February 1951 (aged 80)
- Education: St Peter's College; University of Adelaide
- Occupation: Academic
- Medical career
- Field: Surgeon

Sir Arthur Murray Cudmore CMG FRCS (11 June 1870 – 27 February 1951) was a leading surgeon and a professor at the University of Adelaide in the first half of the 20th century.

== History ==
Cudmore was born at Paringa, South Australia on the River Murray. Educated at St Peter's College and the University of Adelaide, he graduated in surgery and medicine in 1894. Five years' post-graduate study in Britain followed — for a while he was a house surgeon at London Hospital — after which he became a Fellow of the Royal College of Surgeons. Later he became lecturer in clinical surgery at the University of Adelaide and consulting surgeon at the Royal Adelaide Hospital.

Cudmore had a distinguished record in World War I. He left Australia with the rank of lieutenant-colonel as consulting surgeon to the 3rd Australian General Hospital. After being invalided home with typhoid in 1916, he became consulting surgeon for the 4th Military District at Keswick. In August, 1918 he again went overseas, this time to the AIF in France, where he served for almost 12 months. After the war he resumed his post as consulting surgeon on the Australian Army Medical Corps Reserve, and in World War II was chief surgeon at No. 7 AGH, Keswick.

Cudmore, assisted by Herbert Gill-Williams, started the Dental School. Elected a member of the University Council in 1927, he was Dean of the Faculty of Dentistry and president of the Dental Board. He was also a member of the advisory committee of the Royal Adelaide Hospital, where he was honorary surgeon from 1904 to 1925. Executive Council appointed him president of the Medical Board of SA in 1938.

== Other interests ==
Cudmore was a keen motorist, and helped to found the Automobile Club of SA (later Royal Automobile Association), of which he was elected president in 1935. He was a member of the Royal Adelaide Golf Club, and its president from 1925 to 1927.

== Recognition ==
Cudmore was appointed a Companion of the Order of St Michael and St George (CMG) on 1 January 1936.

He was made a Knight Bachelor on 1 January 1945.

== Personal ==
Sir Arthur was the second son of pastoralist James Francis Cudmore (ca.1848–1912), a grandson of Daniel Cudmore (1811–1891) and cousin of Sir Collier Robert Cudmore.

He married Kathleen Mary Cavenagh–Mainwaring (11 February 1874 – 8 March 1951) on 13 August 1901. (Kathleen's father, Wentworth Cavenagh–Mainwaring had represented the district of Yatala in the South Australian House of Assembly from 1863 to 1881 and served as Commissioner of Crown Lands and Public Works.) She survived him by a little over a week. Their children were:

- Rosemary Mainwaring Cudmore (1904– ) married her cousin Rafe Gordon Dutton Cavenagh–Mainwaring, of Whitmore Hall, Whitmore, Staffordshire on 11 June 1931
- Kathleen Cavenagh Mainwaring Cudmore (27 June 1908 – 11 June 2013) married (Richard) Geoffrey Champion de Crespigny on 10 June 1933. Richard Geoffrey Champion de Crespigny (16 June 1907 – 12 February 1966) was a son of C. T. C. de Crespigny (1882–1952). A widow, she married again, to George William Symes (1896–1980) on 30 March 1967.
