= Harry Swift (medicine) =

Harry Swift (7 August 1858 – 29 September 1937) was an English-born medical practitioner, researcher and academic in South Australia. He was Dean of the Faculty of Medicine at the University of Adelaide,.He is remembered for his work at the Adelaide Children's Hospital, where he identified a novel disease in children, known for a time as Swift's disease, now acrodynia or erythrœdema.

== History ==
Swift was born in Ely, Cambridgeshire, the son of John Swift, of "Woodhouse", Ely. He was educated at King's Ely, then at Gonville and Caius College, Cambridge, before being attached to St. George's Hospital, London. He gained his M.B. at Cambridge in June 1883 and M.D. in 1887, and was later attached to Great Ormond street Children's Hospital 1885–1886.

Swift emigrated to South Australia, arrived in Adelaide in December 1887, and joined the practice of Dr. Charles E. Todd, a son of Sir Charles Todd. In 1890 he started in general practice in Franklin Street, and several years later Victoria Square. In 1891 he was appointed Assistant Physician to the Adelaide Hospital, then was in charge of the skin department for many years. In 1910 he was promoted to Senior Physician, which position he held until 1921 when he was made a consulting physician to the hospital. In 1912 Swift was appointed clinical lecturer on diseases of children at the University of Adelaide. In December 1915 he succeeded Sir Joseph Verco as lecturer on the principles and practice of medicine, which position he retained until 1922, when he retired. He succeeded Verco as Dean of the Faculty of Medicine, serving from 1924 to 1926, being followed briefly by Prof. Frederic Wood-Jones, who left South Australia for the University of Hawaii in 1927, Dr. William Ray, then C. T. C. de Crespigny in 1928.

In 1890 he was appointed to the honorary medical staff of the Adelaide Children's Hospital, and remained connected to that institution until 1918, when he was appointed a consulting physician. Swift was a daily visitor to the hospital, acting as general adviser. In 1914 Dr. Swift read a paper at the BMA congress held in New Zealand, describing a disease in children which had not previously been described, and which he called erythroedema, but became better known as "pink disease" or "Swift's disease."

== Other activities ==
- At Cambridge Swift was involved in rowing, was captain of the Caius Boat Club, and rowed in the University Trial Eights in 1879.
- He was member of the Royal Adelaide Golf Club, and won the club championship five consecutive years, and frequently served as club captain.
- Swift was a member of the British Medical Association for years, president 1898–1899 and honorary secretary 1893–1897.
- He was one of the founders of the Medical Defence Association, and its president of the association for many years.
- He contributed many articles to medical journals.

== Recognition ==
Swift was elected vice-president of the Children's Hospital board, and in 1919 given the honorary title of life governor.

Swift died at his home 72 Brougham Place, North Adelaide, aged 79.

== Family ==
Harry Swift married (Kate Marian) Lilian Peacock (1864 – 26 June 1944) at Christ Church, North Adelaide on 23 April 1890. Kate was the youngest daughter of Joseph Peacock, and a niece of Caleb Peacock.

- (Harry) Houghton Swift (1891 – 31 May 1964) married Kate Alexandra Hill in 1937, was an electrical engineer with a considerable career in England
- Sir Brian Herbert Swift (2 February 1893 – 19 May 1969), obstetrician and gynaecologist.
- Major Neville Cropley Swift MC DSO (19 September 1895 – 28 March 1918), fought with the East Lancashire Regiment and the King's Own Royal Lancaster Regiment during the Great War. He died from wounds received on the Somme.
