= Cinema Place =

Cinema Place may refer to:

- Cinema Place, Adelaide, a laneway in Adelaide, South Australia
- Cinema Place, Hayward, a entertainment and shopping centre in Hayward, California, US
