= Exeter Hotel =

- Exeter Hotel in 2026

General information
- Type: Pub
- Location: 246–248 Rundle Street, Adelaide, South Australia, Australia
- Coordinates: 34°55′20.51″S 138°36′31.64″E
- Completed: 1888 (present building)
- Opened: 1851 (original hotel)

Technical details
- Material: Sandstone with stucco detailing
- Floor count: 2

Website
- www.theexeter.com.au

The Exeter Hotel is a historic hotel located on Rundle Street in Adelaide, Australia.

== History ==
The hotel obtained a liquor licence on 13 March 1851. The original proprietor was Robert Radford. The hotel was named after Mr Radford's home town of Exeter in England. Radford had moved to Adelaide from Tasmania in 1850.

A Mr Glover opposed the application for a licence (it appears Mr Glover was another publican), but the licence was granted in any event.

The hotel originally provided, apart from food and drink, lodgings for travellers, and a stables.

The Supreme Court of South Australia case of Wayland v Taylor concerns a dispute between a contractor and a sub-contractor for building work done in relation to the hotel in 1851.

On 19 May 1851 a meeting of residents of the north-east corner of Adelaide took place at the hotel, to consider proposals for a road from the city through the Parklands to Kensington and Norwood.

In July 1851, a number of concerts were given at the hotel by a group known as the 'Ohio Serenaders'. Thus began a long history of the hotel hosting a wide range of musicians.

On 1 September 1851 Rebecca Cludans, a little girl, was convicted for obtaining gin from Laura Radford, who worked at the hotel, by pretending she was acquiring it on an errand for an adult. This was not the only crime that occurred at the hotel at this time. Also in September 1851, a forger and lunatic, Henry Baker, was found drinking at the Hotel by a policeman, and subsequently arrested. On 14 December in the same year, the publican Mr Radford accepted a watch from an August von Nontzen, a "burly German", who was leaving the colony, as payment for his debts to Mr Radford. It transpired von Nontzen had stolen the watch from a young lady, Jean Morton.

On 7 May 1852, a grand ball was given at the hotel to celebrate the safe return to Adelaide of the ship, the 'Escort'. It appears at around this time, Radford abandoned the hotel to dig for gold in Victoria. However, the hotel continued operation in his name in his absence, with the liquor licence being renewed on 22 May 1852, despite a late application having been made. It was submitted by Mr Radford to the licensing court that the hotel had been "always well-conducted".

In December 1852, an employee of the hotel, Mary Conolly, was caught stealing several bottles from the hotel, as well as a lodger's purse. Perhaps this had an effect on Radford, for on 13 December 1852, Radford gave up the licence to the Exeter Hotel to a James Clark.

In January 1853, Clark had already got into trouble at his new establishment. A Matthew Wilks accused him of assault. Wilks claimed he had merely complained his pint was not up to the measure, and this provoked Clark to strike him. However, a witness told a different story - Clark had refused Wilks entry on the grounds he was a man of bad character, and that Wilks had then claimed to be owed money by Clark for some vegetables he had sold him, and refused to go away until he was paid. Clark tried to remove Wilks from the hotel, and Wilks struck out at Clark, who then retaliated. The court decided that, either way, Clark had assaulted Wilks, and fined him 10 shillings and costs.

On 12 June 1854, the licence was transferred by Clark to Rawson Ewart. Ewart had only been ten months in the Colony, and had previously worked as a draper. Ewart encountered trouble before long. On 2 December 1854, a William Stevens was found in Mount Gambier and arrested for obtaining money under false pretences from Mr Ewart.

In April 1855, there was a robbery of valuables of a lodger perpetrated by a Charles Walker. On 28 October 1855, there was a small fire at the hotel, but no-one was harmed. The establishment appears to have been well-regarded at the time, with respectable people meeting there, including a social breakfast of the Congregational Union on 17 April 1856.

In 1888, the original building was demolished and the current building was built. It was thought this decision was made so the Hotel could better compete with the rival Tavistock Hotel, which inhabited a grand building (which building was ultimately demolished to construct Frome Street).

In 1929, the building was substantially refurbished to appear largely as it does today, with its distinctive green-tile facade.

In 2001, the hotel received listing as a local heritage place by the City of Adelaide.

== Proprietors ==
- 1851 – 1852 - Robert Radford
- 1852 – 1854 - James Clark
- 1854 - 1863 - Rownson Ewart (died 4 April 1877). A son was a member of John McDouall Stuart's 5th expedition and Boyle Travers Finniss's expedition to Escape Cliffs, Northern Territory.
- 1863 – 1868 - Charles Hathway and Samuel Smith
- 1868 - 1883 - Henry Pelzer
- 1883 - Albert James Wight
- 1883 - 1885 - Heinrich Jahn
- 1888 - 1897 - Mrs Regina Jahn
- 1895 - Charles Hannam
- 1897 - 1903 - Adolph Jahn
- 1903 - Albert Hendig
- 1903 - 1907 - Alfred Ernest Press
- 1907 - 1909 - James William Tidswell
- 1909 - 1910 - Percival S Almond
- 1910 - Norman C Lemon
- 1910 - 1911 - Celena Featherstone
- 1911 - 1923 - Rudolph Jahn
- 1923 - 1932 - John B. Bache
- 1932 - 1934 - Alma E. Rook
- 1934 - 1936 - Albert Edward Rook
- 1936 - 1937 - Alma E. Rook
- 1937 - Albert Edward Rook
- 1937 - 1939 - Alma E. Rook
- 1937 - 1939 - Horace Scott
- 1939 - 1940 - Alma E. Rook
- 1940 - 1941 - Harold Chapman James Lucas
- 1941 - 1944 - Archibald Simonds
- 1944 - 1952 - Mrs Nellie Augusta Simonds
- 1972 - GJ Josephs
- 1973 - ?? CW Parsons
- 2000 – Present - Jurack Pty Ltd

== See also ==
- List of oldest companies in Australia
