= Pamela Joy Spry =

Australian nurse (1924–2021)

Pamela Joy Spry AM
- Pamela Joy Spry, from a 1947 class photo
- Born: 10 December 1924; Adelaide
- Died: 8 January 2021 (aged 96); Adelaide
- Occupation: Nurse

Pamela Joy Spry AM (10 December 1924 – 8 January 2021) was an Australian nurse and Army Officer. She was director of nursing at the Royal Adelaide Hospital from 1973 to 1984.

== Early life ==
Spry was born in Adelaide, and trained as a nurse at the Royal Adelaide Hospital from 1945 to 1947. She also had midwifery training in Sydney.

== Career ==
Spry worked at the Royal Melbourne Hospital and the Queen Elizabeth Hospital in Adelaide as a young woman. She was Director of Nursing at the Royal Adelaide Hospital from 1973 to 1984. Among the policies advanced during her tenure as director, nurses were no longer required to wear the traditional nurse's cap or white stockings while on duty; nurses in residence were no longer required to register their absences; and nurses were encouraged and supported to earn college degrees in their field. "I wanted nurses to no longer be seen by anyone as 'handmaidens' to the doctors but to begin to become their equal," she later recalled. Spry served on the South Australia Health Commission, the education committee of the Nurses' Board, and the South Australian branch of the Australian Nursing Federation.

Spry achieved the rank of Lieutenant in the Royal Australian Army Nursing Corps in 1955. In 1988, she became a member of the Order of Australia (AM), in the general division. She gave an oral history interview to the J. D. Somerville Oral History Collection at the State Library of South Australia in 1989.

== Personal life ==
Spry used a wheelchair in her later years. She died in 2021, aged 96 years, in Adelaide.
