= Elizabeth Auld =

Australian journalist and writer (1901–1998)

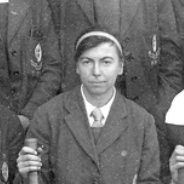
- Captain of the hockey team in 1920
- Born: 16 September 1901; Adelaide
- Died: 30 October 1998 (aged 97); Marryatville
- Other names: Lizzy of Tom
- Occupation: journalist
- Partner: Edwin Peter Tivey

Elizabeth Auld, aka Lizzie Auld, (16 September 1901 – 30 October 1998) was an Australian journalist and writer.

== Life ==
Auld was born in 1901 in the Adelaide suburb of Knightsbridge with the mining expert, Lionel Gee, as her godfather. Her parents were credited with introducing the production of wine to South Australia. Jemima (born Wade) and Ernest Patrick Auld, known as Mimi and Pat. She was already interested in writing when she completed her schooling at St Peter's Girls' School. She had been a student at Edith Hubbe's school but thinks she was expelled after arguing with a teacher.

She went to work for the Register in Adelaide initially as a proofreader with the encouragement of her godfather. During the 1920s C. T. C. de Crespigny wrote a medical column for the Register which she edited.

In March 1943, her fiancée Major Edwin Peter Tivey died as a prisoner of war in Italy. She never married. She moved to the Woman's Day magazine in 1950. She was the first woman to report from the Woomera rocket site. She later worked at the Australian newspaper where she reported on gossip for the "Martin Collins" column from Melbourne. She managed to avoid being retired due to her age. She was a friend of the Murdoch family and it was said that someone was persuaded to change her birth date in the employment records. She finally retired in 1974.

Auld published The Animal Detectives and the Case of the Kidnapped Kitten in 1995. It was her first and only book. The book included an introduction by Barry Humphries and the editor of the Australian, Lachlan Murdoch and his grandmother, Dame Elisabeth Murdoch, attended the book's launch. Elizabeth Auld died in Marryatville in 1998. She had spent 50 years working in the Murdoch empire.
