= Rundle Street =

Street in Adelaide, South Australia

Rundle Street South Australia
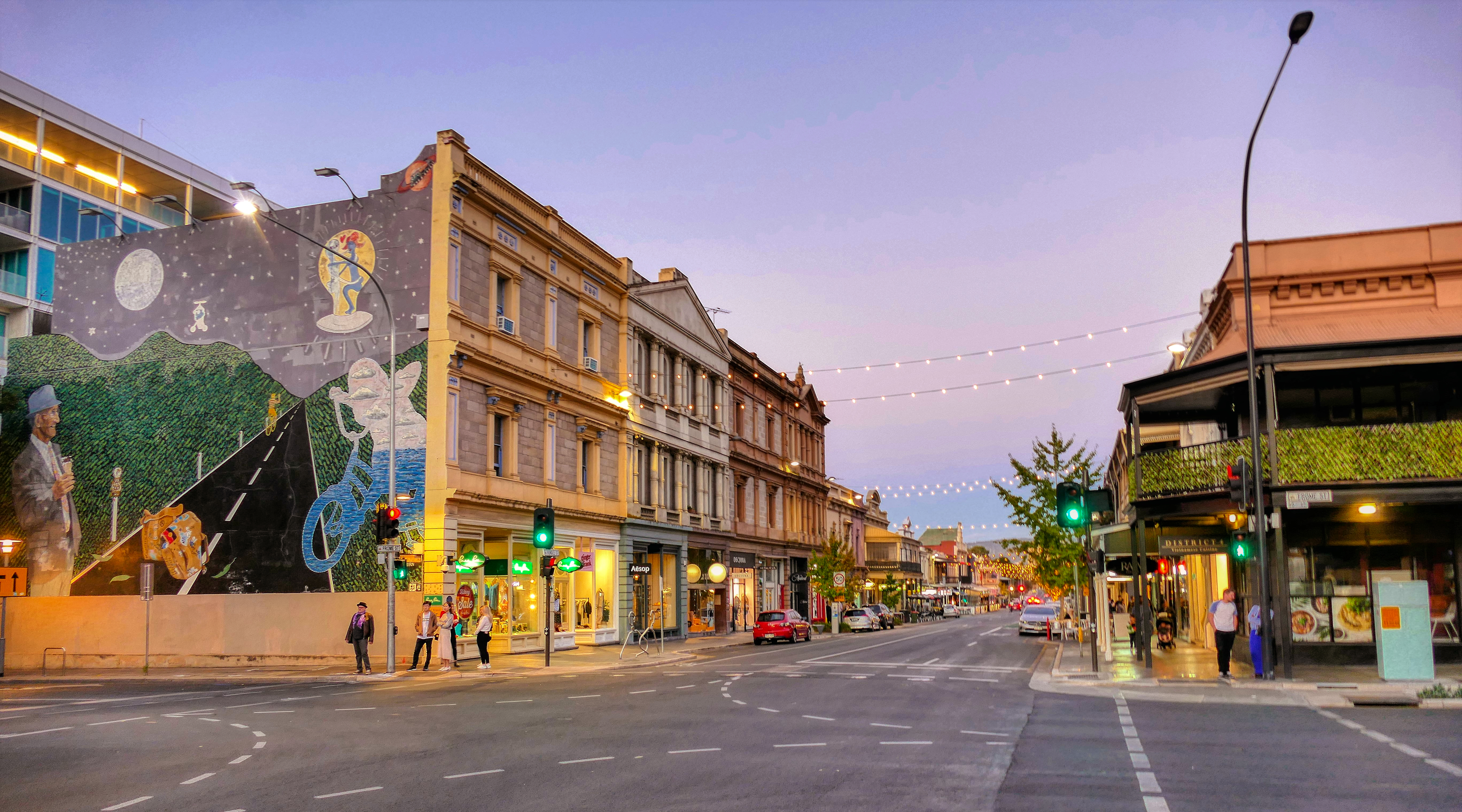
- Rundle Street, looking east (April 2019)
- Coordinates: 34.922651°S 138.605528°E (West end); 34.922405°S 138.610875°E (East end)

General information
- Type: Street
- Location: Adelaide city centre
- Length: 500 m (0.3 mi)
- Opened: 1837

Major junctions
- West end: Pulteney Street; Adelaide
- Frome Street; East Terrace
- East end: Rundle Road; Adelaide

Location(s)
- LGA(s): City of Adelaide

Rundle Street, often referred to as "Rundle Street East" as distinct from Rundle Mall, is a street in the East End of the city centre of Adelaide, the capital of South Australia. It runs from Pulteney Street to East Terrace, where it becomes Rundle Road through the East Park Lands. (Note: A separate Rundle Street continues from Rundle Road through Kent Town).) The street is close to Adelaide Botanic Garden, Rundle Park, Rymill Park, Hindmarsh Square and North Terrace.

The street contains numerous cafés, restaurants, shops, cinemas, clubs, and hotels. It is one of Adelaide's most popular streets for cafés and fashion. Most of the street has a heritage façade, but has been redeveloped for modern use, with some buildings converted to residences, such as the East End Markets.

== Junction list and description ==
Location	km	mi	Destinations	Notes
Adelaide city centre	0	0.0	Pulteney Street	Continues as Rundle Mall
Adelaide city centre	0.2	0.12	Frome Street	
Adelaide city centre	0.5	0.31	East Terrace	Continues as Rundle Road
1.000 mi = 1.609 km; 1.000 km = 0.621 mi

Bent Street and Union Street run through to Grenfell Street on the southern side, Ebenezer Place runs south leading to a pedestrianised precinct and turns westwards into Union Street, while the cul de sac Synagogue Place, and pedestrianised Vaughan Place (next to the Exeter). Cinema Place runs off the northern side of Vaughan place, and is home to several businesses and offices, including The Elephant, Palace Nova, Radio Fresh 92.7 and MusicSA.

Rundle Street is two-lane, with parking on both sides plus bicycle lanes. It is one of the narrower streets of the Adelaide grid, at 1 chain (66 ft; 20 m) wide.

A separate Rundle Street continues from Rundle Road through Kent Town.

=== Rundle Mall ===
The western end of Rundle Street, which originally ran to King William Street from Pulteney Street, was closed to vehicles in 1972 to form the pedestrian street of Rundle Mall.

== History ==
The street was named after John Rundle, a director of the South Australian Company and member of the British House of Commons, by the Street Naming Committee on 23 May 1837.

It was installed with the first electric street lighting in South Australia in 1895 at the former intersection of Rundle, King William and Hindley streets.

The Malcolm Reid & Co. Ltd building at no. 187-207 was extensively refurbished in 1909.(See below for further details.)

A tramline ran through the street in the early 20th century.

=== Grand Central Hotel / Foy & Gibson ===
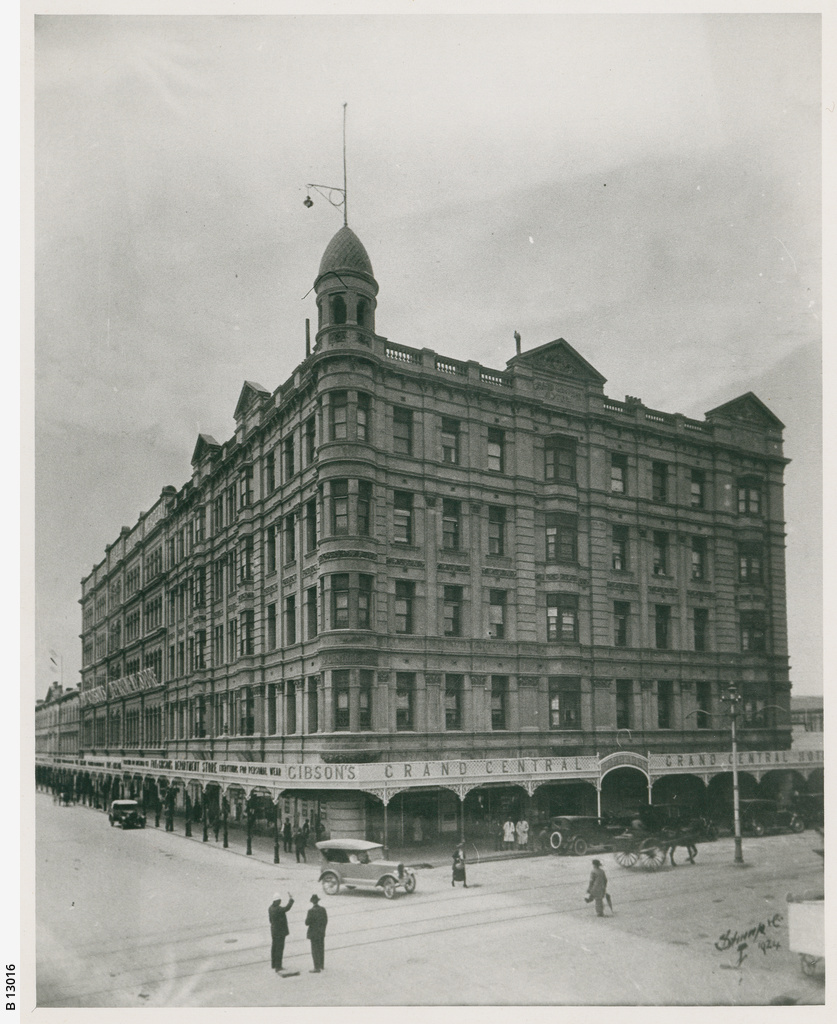
Grand Central Hotel, later Foy & Gibson and demolished in the 1970s for a carpark.

The Grand Central Hotel was a magnificent heritage building which was located on the corner of Rundle Street and Pulteney Street, a six-storey Victorian-style building opened in 1911. It was later concerted into a Foy & Gibson retail store, designed to complement their adjacent furniture emporium adjacent. The building was demolished in 1975 and the Rundle Street UPark was built there.

The Grand Central in its turn replaced the elegant and exclusive two-storey York Hotel, but despite some high-profile guests (the Prince of Wales in 1920, Arthur Conan Doyle in 1922), it never prospered, and around 1925 was absorbed into the emporium.

The building was sold to the Electricity Trust for showrooms and offices, then in 1975–1976 was demolished to make way for a multi-level car park, an open, austere structure of concrete slabs and iron railings.

=== Rundle Street siege ===
In September 1976, a Victorian man, Michael O'Connor, entered Hambly Clark's gun shop (now closed) at 182 Rundle Street, between Pulteney Street and Synagogue Place, and stole two shotguns which he loaded with his own ammunition. He then began shooting indiscriminately. After a lengthy confrontation he was shot by a police sniper and taken to the nearby Royal Adelaide Hospital but was declared dead on arrival.

== Notable buildings and traders ==
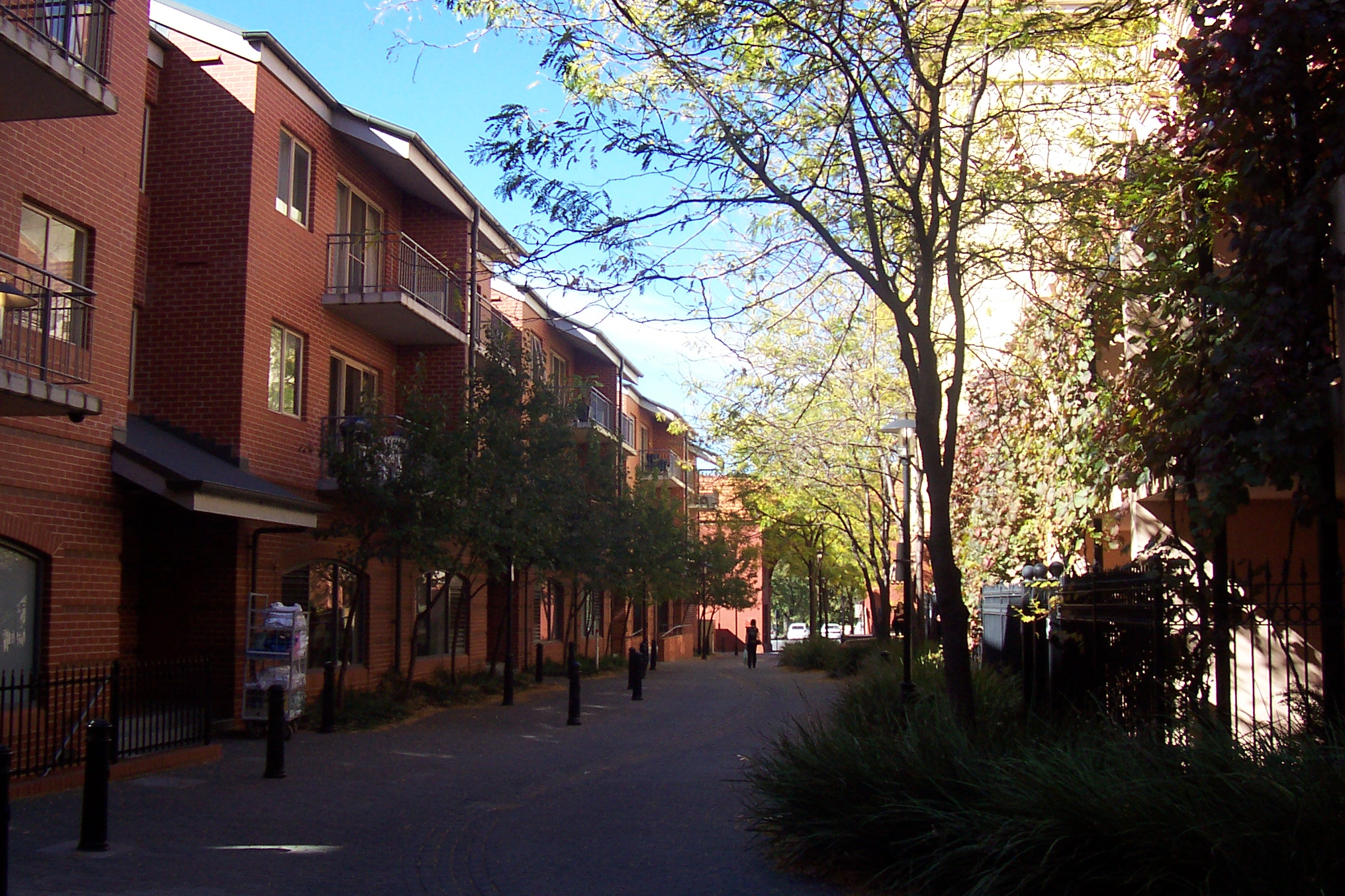
Garden East (1990s)

The Garden East apartments were built during the 1990s as part of the redevelopment of old warehouse and office buildings in the East End. "Building D" was designed by Woods Bagot around 1999.

The Palace Nova Eastend, a cinema complex which has hosted the Adelaide Film Festival, as well as continuing to host series of other annual film festivals created by other organisations, such as the Alliance Française's French Film Festival, along with regular screenings of other films in their 12 cinemas, including the Eximax, the largest screen in Adelaide. Radio station Fresh 92.7 has its studios and office adjacent to Palace Nova Eastend.

There are many high-end fashion retailers in Rundle Street. Among these is Miss Gladys Sym Choon, owned by a company which retained the name of one of the Sym Choon family's businesses, in existence since the 1920s, when they bought the business in 1985. (Note: The Sym Choon family, parents John Sym Choon and So Yung Moon, with offspring: George Sym Choon (born c.1900): ran Sym Choon and Company, the original family company.; Dorothy Sym Choon (born c.1902): rented her shop.; Gladys Sym Choon (born c.1905): the first woman in South Australia to form a business in her own right, and the first to import goods from overseas. She opened the China Gift Store in Rundle Street, Adelaide, at the age of 16 in 1923. Her wares included imported "embroidered napery, hand-carved woodwork, ivory, amber, and jade ornaments", as well as furniture with pearl inlays and other Chinese goods. Her shop closed in 1985, with a fashion retailer retaining the name as "Miss Gladys Sym Choon" when it bought the business.; Gordon Sym Choon (born 1910): importer and retailer of fireworks, supplying most of Adelaide and South Australia.)

Pubs in Rundle Street include the Exeter Hotel; The Austral; The Elephant British Pub (in Cinema Place, near the Palace Nova); The Stag Public House (at the junction with East Terrace); and the Belgian Beer Cafe (on Ebenezer Place).

=== The Austral to Malcolm Reid building group ===
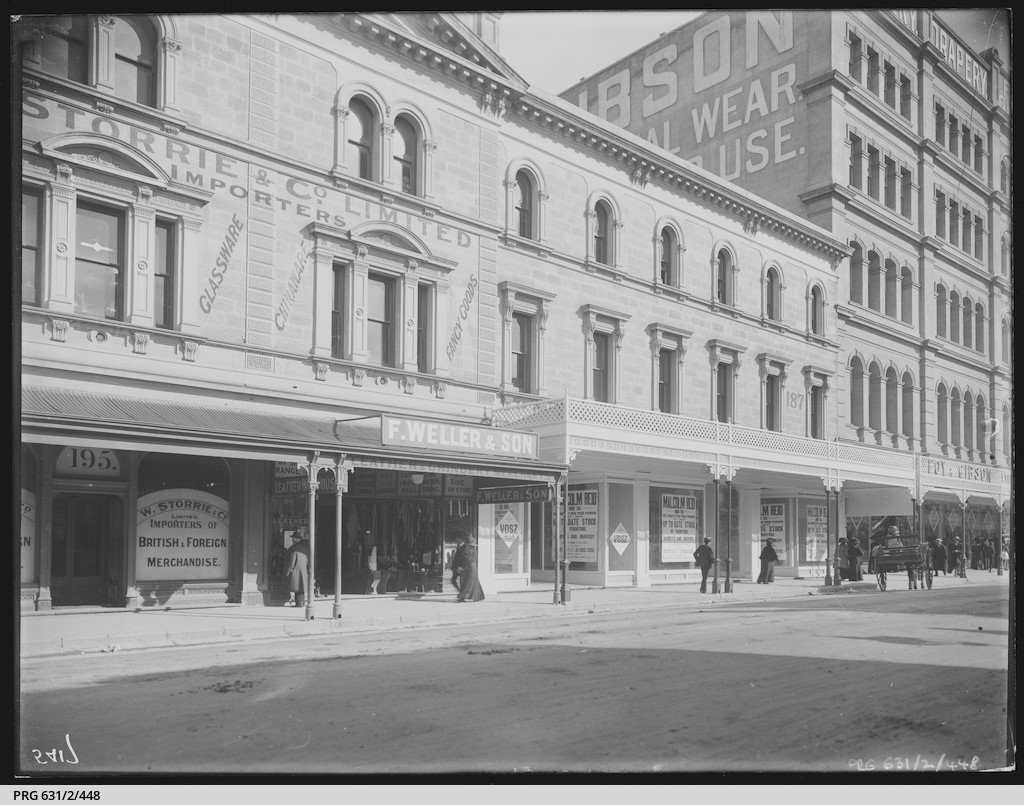
Southern side, c.1929

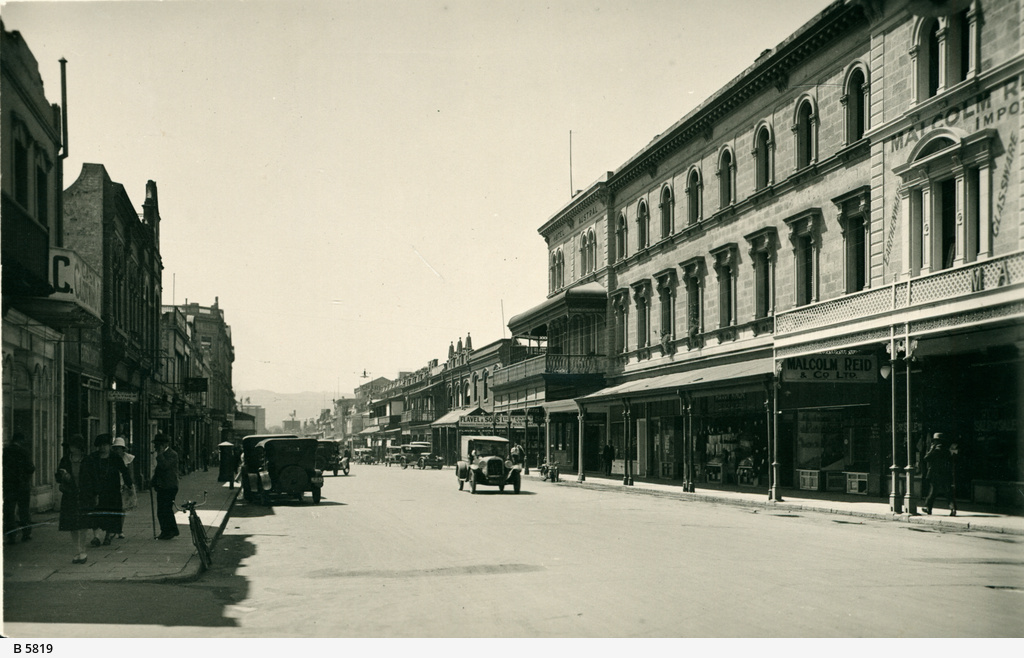
Looking east, 1929

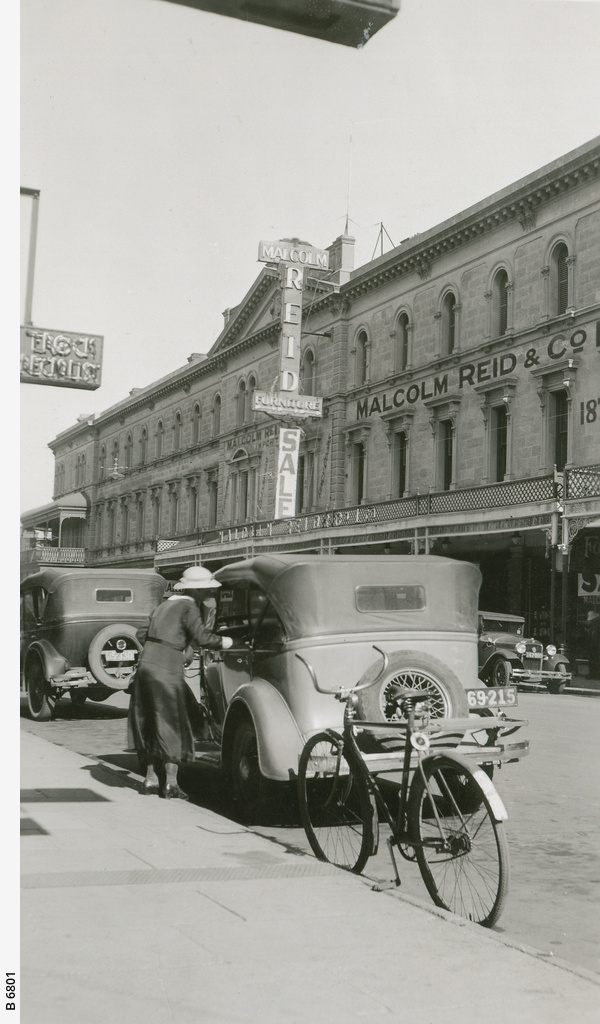
Malcolm Reid building, 1936

The Malcolm Reid & Co. Ltd building is part of a group at no. 187-207 originally built for the South Australian Company in the early 1880s. The company commissioned architect William McMinn to design a set of buildings in stages from east to west. The first building, comprising 14 shops and a hotel to provide accommodation in the three storeys above, were completed in January 1880. The section later occupied by Malcolm Reid & Co. was completed last, around 1883. The completed group occupies almost two town acres, and is unusual in Adelaide in South Australia on account of its extent.

The group is solidly constructed, made of sandstone with stucco decoration. The original composition was altered slightly by chamfering the corner with Bent Street, and adding a tiered balcony to the hotel (the Austral), and the hotel and the section occupied by Malcolm Reid were later painted.

The group bordered Foy & Gibson's to the west, with Malcolm Reid opening next door in September 1909. At this time, number 195 Rundle Street was occupied by W. Storrie and Company , "Importers of British & Foreign Merchandise", with F. Weller & Son leather shop next door. Malcolm Reid premises are located between Wellers shop and Foy and Gibson. By 1929, Both Storrie and Weller had gone. Storrie closed in 1916.

This part of the building, formerly used as a warehouse by Charles Segar, was extensively refurbished in 1909, to create a continuous frontage and almost complete reconstruction of the rear. As part of the renovation, a large basement was excavated, measuring 66 ft (20 m) by 120 ft (37 m), and the total accommodation doubled, according to The Advertiser of 14 September 1909. The expansion and opening took place within around a year of Reid and his family having been in England for several years.

The accommodation behind the Austral and the four adjoining shops remain representative of 19th-century terrace development, with large bluestone walls along with brickwork.

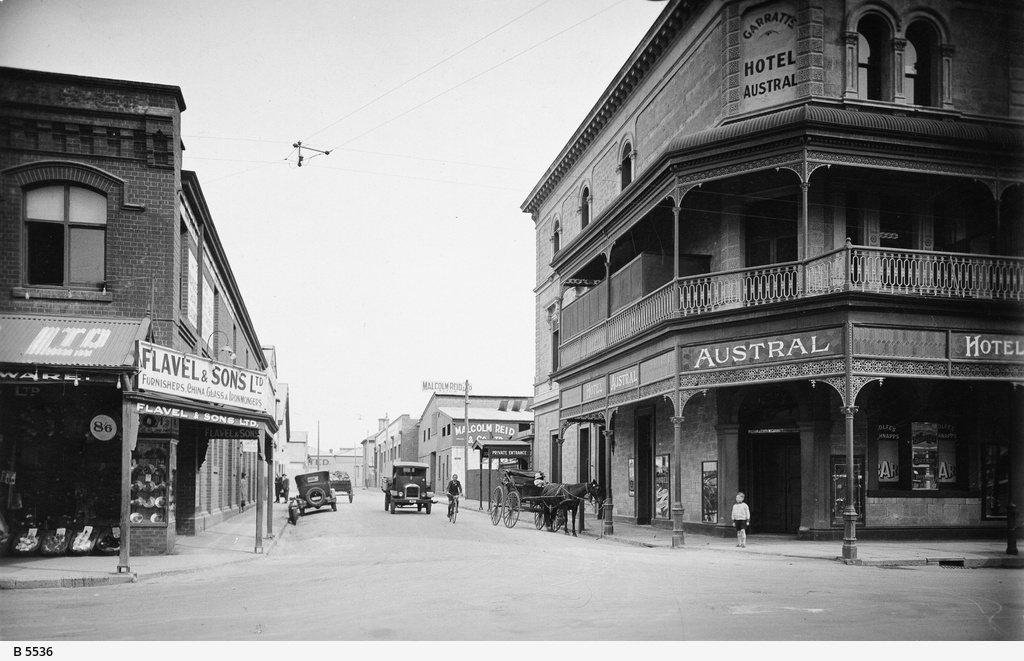
Austral Hotel, cnr Rundle & Bent Streets, 1929

The facade of the Malcolm Reid Emporium, occupying nos. 187-195, was heritage-listed on the South Australian Heritage Register on 5 June 1986, after a survey of the whole group was undertaken. The signage is still retained today.

The hotel on the corner of Bent Street was opened as Cohen's Family Hotel, in 1898 being renamed to the Astral. The Austral Hotel, which was heritage-listed on 5 April 1984, was held by licensees William and Edith Garrett in 1929. It became known for its illegal betting in the 1950s, undergoing a transformation as a major venue for live music in the 1980s and 1990s. It became the first pub in South Australia to have Coopers beer on tap, and later underwent an extensive restoration in 2020.

=== Grundy's Shoes ===
Grundy's Shoes has been in the shoe trade in the East End since 1868, first operating as Judd Shoes, a cobbler, and continuing as a family business which later imported and sold shoes. The Rundle Street store (built 1896) first traded as H. Grundy and Co making it the longest continuous trader in the street. The company expanded to include Grundy's and Barlows shoe stores across greater Adelaide and Victor Harbor. In March 2018, the store celebrated 150 years in operation by a ceremonial transportation of goods by horse and cart from their Glenelg store to their Rundle Street store. As of 2023 Grundy's is owned by the Judd and Whittenbury families, who bought the business in 1921. It continued to perform strongly through a downturn in the industry in 2019.

== Rundle Lantern ==
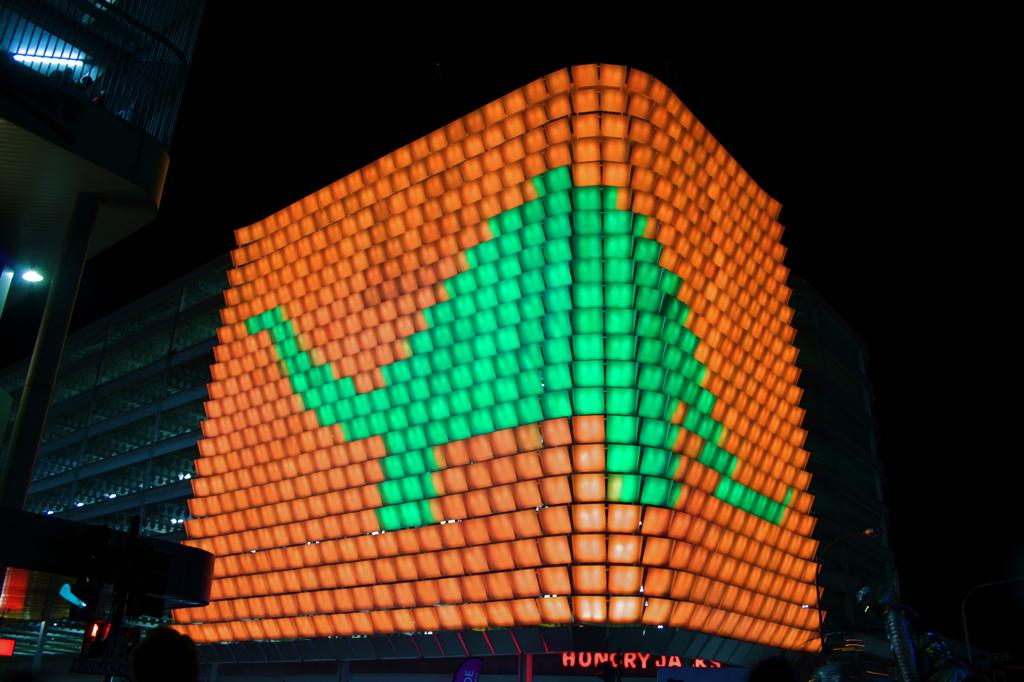
The Rundle Lantern, an LED display on the Rundle Street Upark

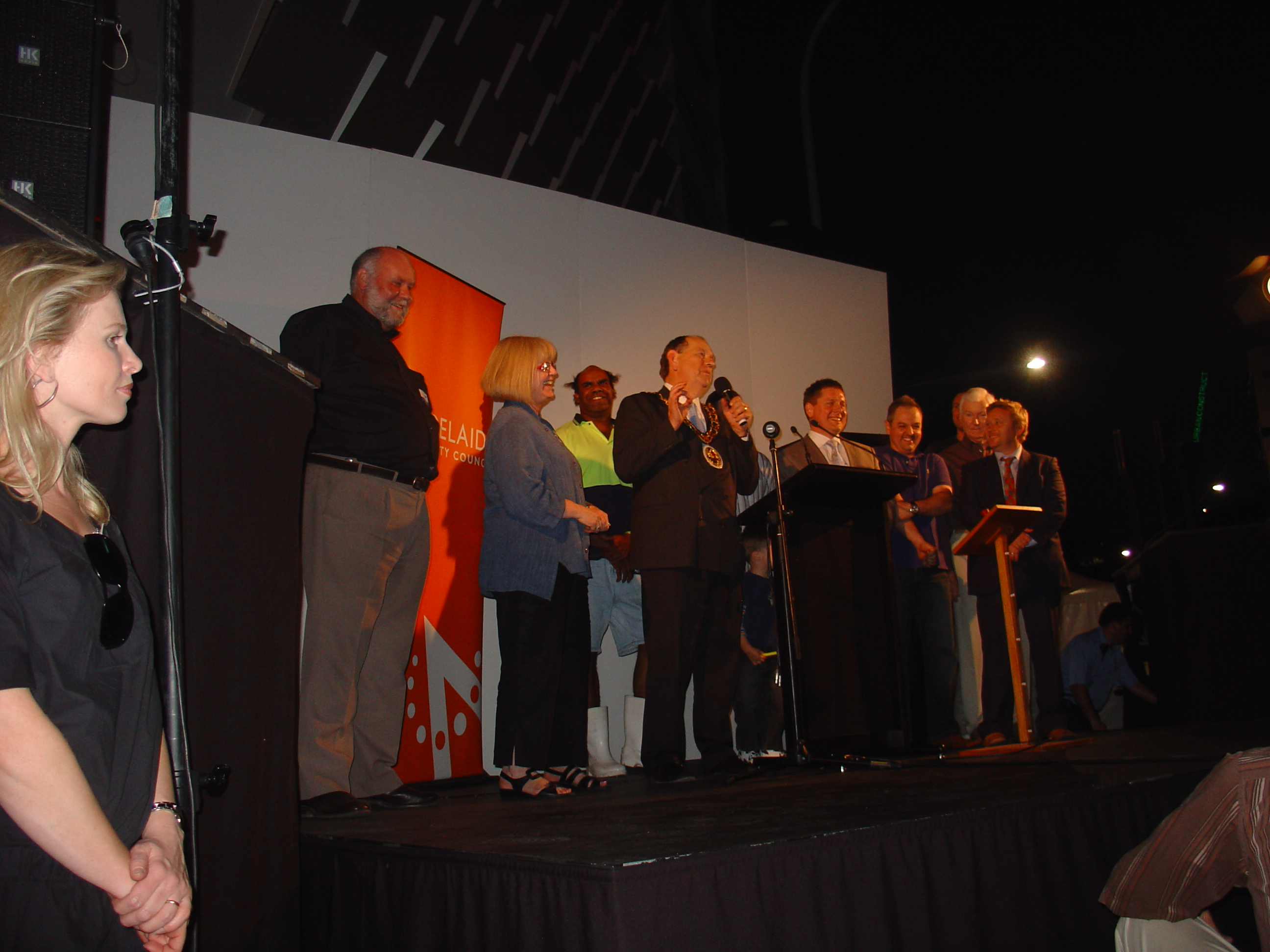
The lighting up ceremony of the Rundle Lantern

In late 2006, the Adelaide City Council proposed to transform Rundle Street's western approach, the Pulteney Street-Rundle Mall junction, into a Piccadilly Circus or Times Square-type meeting place at a cost of around $1.5 million. The proposal, based on ideas expressed in mid-2005 for neon billboards and video screens, included an initial nine design concepts, which were narrowed to two for consideration by the Council in early 2007.

A minimal design called the Rundle Lantern – a 748-panel LED lighting display wrapping around the façade of the Rundle Street carpark, Upark, – was eventually selected, with the Council deciding that video screens were inappropriate for the location. The Rundle Lantern was designed and developed by a local company, Fusion, with the design strategy focused on creating a "lantern" for the city to use as a dynamic cultural canvas. There has been controversy about crediting artists that have contributed to the lantern.

The Lantern is completely solar-powered and carbon neutral, and there is a webcam via which anyone can view the changing digital art at night, or what it looks like at any time of day. More than 16 million colours can be projected onto the surfaces of the Lantern.
