= SA Pathology =

Research institute in Australia

Coordinates: 34°55′21″S 138°35′57″E

SA Pathology, (formerly the Institute of Medical and Veterinary Science (IMVS)), is an organisation providing diagnostic and clinical pathology services throughout South Australia for the public health sector. The headquarters are in Frome Road, Adelaide, and it has many patient collection centres and numerous laboratories located throughout South Australia.

The Hanson Centre for Cancer Research was established in 1991 by SA Pathology, broadening its scope of research and becoming the Hanson Institute in 2001.

As a not-for-profit organisation, SA Pathology bulk-bills patients for all Medical Benefits Schedule (MBS) pathology tests. In a recent article by Choice magazine, it was recognised as the only consistently "no gap, bulk billing" pathology provider in South Australia.

== History ==
The organisation was established as the Institute of Medical and Veterinary Science (IMVS) in the late 1930s.

The Institute began as an offshoot of the Royal Adelaide Hospital laboratories, being located in Frome Road nearby, in what used to be South Australia's principal teaching hospital precinct. RAH Superintendent and Dean of Medicine Sir Trent Champion de Crespigny created a combined laboratory services with clinical pathology training and medical research in one facility. Dr. E. Weston Hurst was appointed its first director in 1937, leaving the role in 1943.

In the 1970s, the Forensic Pathology and Biology divisions relocated, eventually becoming Forensic Science SA. There was growth and diversification in the 1980s, as the relationships with the RAH and the University of Adelaide were strengthened.

Following a review recommending the creation of separate science research laboratories, with new developments being integrated into IMVS and RAH, the Hanson Institute was established in the early 1990s.

In 2008 IMVS merged with the pathology department of the Women's and Children's Hospital and Flinders Medical Centre's South Path, with the resulting organisation being renamed SA Pathology. The inaugural Executive Director of SA Pathology was Professor Ruth Salom. Also in that year, the Centre for Cancer Biology (CCB) was established within SA Pathology. with the inaugural co directors of the Centre being Professor Angel Lopez and Professor Sharad Kumar, the centre was officially launched by Professor Ian Fraser.

== Activities ==
Profits generated from pathology are used to support rural communities, medical training and medical research. SA Pathology has medical researchers studying diseases and disorders ranging from blood, breast and colon cancer, bone fractures, rheumatoid arthritis, asthma, hepatitis, infectious diseases and genetic disorders.

As a non-profit organisation, SA Pathology bulk-bills patients for all Medical Benefits Schedule (MBS) pathology tests. In a recent article by Choice magazine, it was recognised as the only consistently "no gap, bulk billing" pathology provider in South Australia.

== Hanson Institute ==
The Hanson Institute is the research division of the Royal Adelaide Hospital and SA Pathology, which also works in close collaboration with the University of Adelaide.

The Hanson Centre for Cancer Research was established in 1991, with funding from the Australian Cancer Research Foundation as well as a grant from the Anti-Cancer Foundation, a South Australian organisation It was constructed within the IMVS building, and combined the research arms of the Human Immunology and Haematology Divisions of the IMVS, both of which specialised in leukaemia research.

In 2001 the Hanson Institute was opened, which would cover all cancer research for the IMVS and the RAH and would henceforth include many fields of research in addition to cancer. It incorporates:

- the Centre for Cancer Research;
- the Centre for Bone and Joint Research;
- Clinical Research Centre;
- Centre for Neurological Diseases; and
- the Centre for Biomedical Research.
