= Adelaide Dental School =

Australian dental school

Coordinates: 34°55′08″S 138°36′25″E

- Adelaide Health and Medical Sciences Building in 2026
- Type: Dental school
- Established: 1920
- Parent institution: Adelaide University
- Dean: Richard Logan
- Location: Adelaide Health and Medical Sciences Building, North Terrace, Adelaide, South Australia, Australia
- Campus: Urban
- Website: Official website

The Adelaide Dental School is a component of the Faculty of Health and Medical Sciences at the University of Adelaide.

The Adelaide Dental School engages in both teaching and research. Its programs include the Bachelor of Dental Surgery and the Bachelor of Oral Health, together with a range of postgraduate degrees. The school also offers to the dental profession a program of continuing education. It is the third-oldest university in Australia.

In 2014, it was announced that the Dental School would be moving to a new campus in the North Terrace campus.

== Research ==
The Adelaide Dental School is home to the Australian Research Centre for Population Oral Health.

== Graduate programs ==
The Adelaide Dental School offers formal graduate programs leading to a Doctor of Clinical Dentistry degree (DClinDent) in the following areas:

- Oral and Maxillofacial Pathology
- Oral and Maxillofacial Surgery (Offered conjointly with a medical degree from the Faculty of Medicine)
- Orthodontics
- Periodontics
- Prosthodontics
- Endodontics
- Special Needs Dentistry

The Faculty also offers graduate programs in Forensic Odontology and Restorative dentistry.

== Accreditation ==
- The University of Adelaide's dental school is accredited by the Australian Dental Council and the Royal Australasian College of Dental Surgeons.
