= Frome Road =

Road in Adelaide, South Australia

Frome Road South Australia
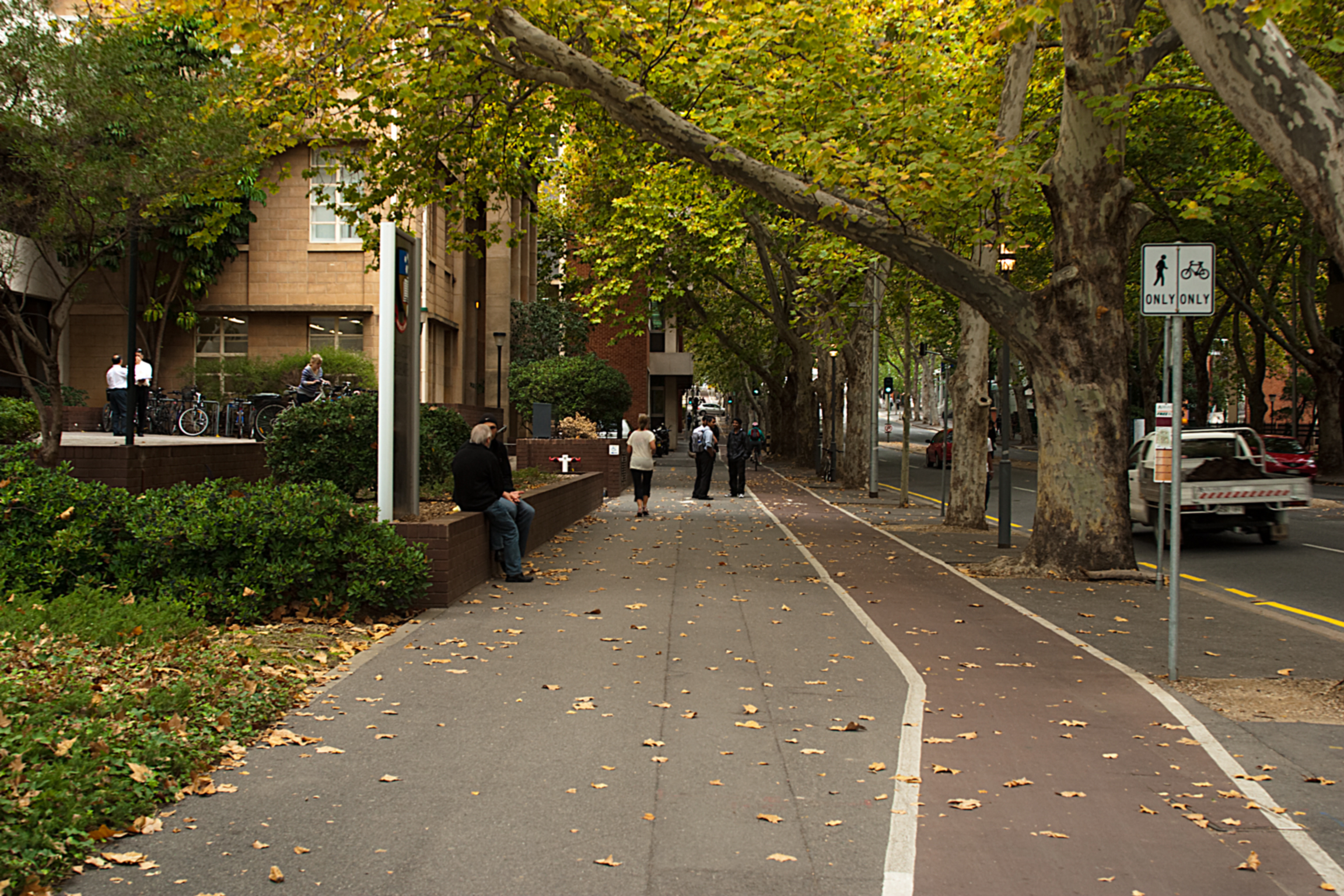
- View looking up Frome Road at side of the old Royal Adelaide Hospital in 2009
- Coordinates: 34.911638°S 138.601861°E (North end); 34.921115°S 138.607781°E (South end)

General information
- Type: Street
- Location: Adelaide city centre
- Length: 1.2 km (0.7 mi)

Major junctions
- North end: Brougham Place; North Adelaide
- MacKinnon Parade; Victoria Drive; North Terrace
- South end: Frome Street; Adelaide

Location(s)
- LGA(s): City of Adelaide

Frome Road is a connecting road in the South Australian capital city of Adelaide. It starts from North Terrace in the Adelaide city centre, running in a northerly direction past the University of South Australia, the site of the old Royal Adelaide Hospital, now known as Lot Fourteen, the Institute of Medical and Veterinary Science and the University of Adelaide, and then through the Adelaide Parklands to the Adelaide Zoo where it turns northeasterly, crosses the River Torrens via Albert Bridge, and continues through the parklands to the intersection with Melbourne Street and Brougham Place in North Adelaide. It is one of the three roads connecting the city centre to North Adelaide, the others being King William Road and Montefiore Road.

The road (and street) are named after Edward Charles Frome, a Surveyor General of South Australia.

Frome Road is continued south into the city square as Frome Street, which was built in the 1960s and runs through the Adelaide city centre from North Terrace to Carrington Street.

Adelaide Botanic High School opened in January 2019 on Frome Road.

In 2024-2025, the Frome Street Bikeway was extended along Frome Road.

== Albert Bridge ==
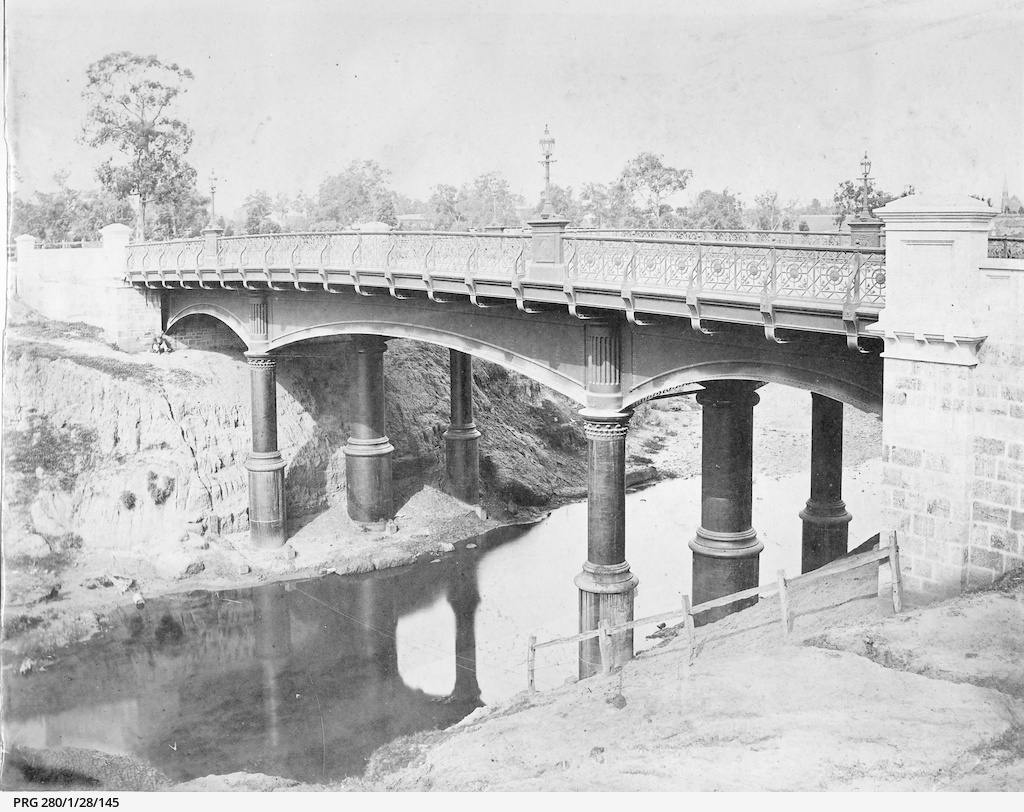
Albert Bridge over the River Torrens, 1885

The Albert Bridge was constructed in 1879. An earlier bridge on the site was washed away by flood water in the 1840s. The bridge has a central span of 60 feet (18 m) with two end spans of 30 feet (9.1 m) each. The supports are caissons filled with concrete. the cast-iron work was imported from England. Abutments, piers and wing walls are sandstone from Tea Tree Gully. The bridge was redecked in the 1950s and again in 1982, including additional structural members.
