= Frome Street =

Street in Adelaide, South Australia

Frome Street South Australia
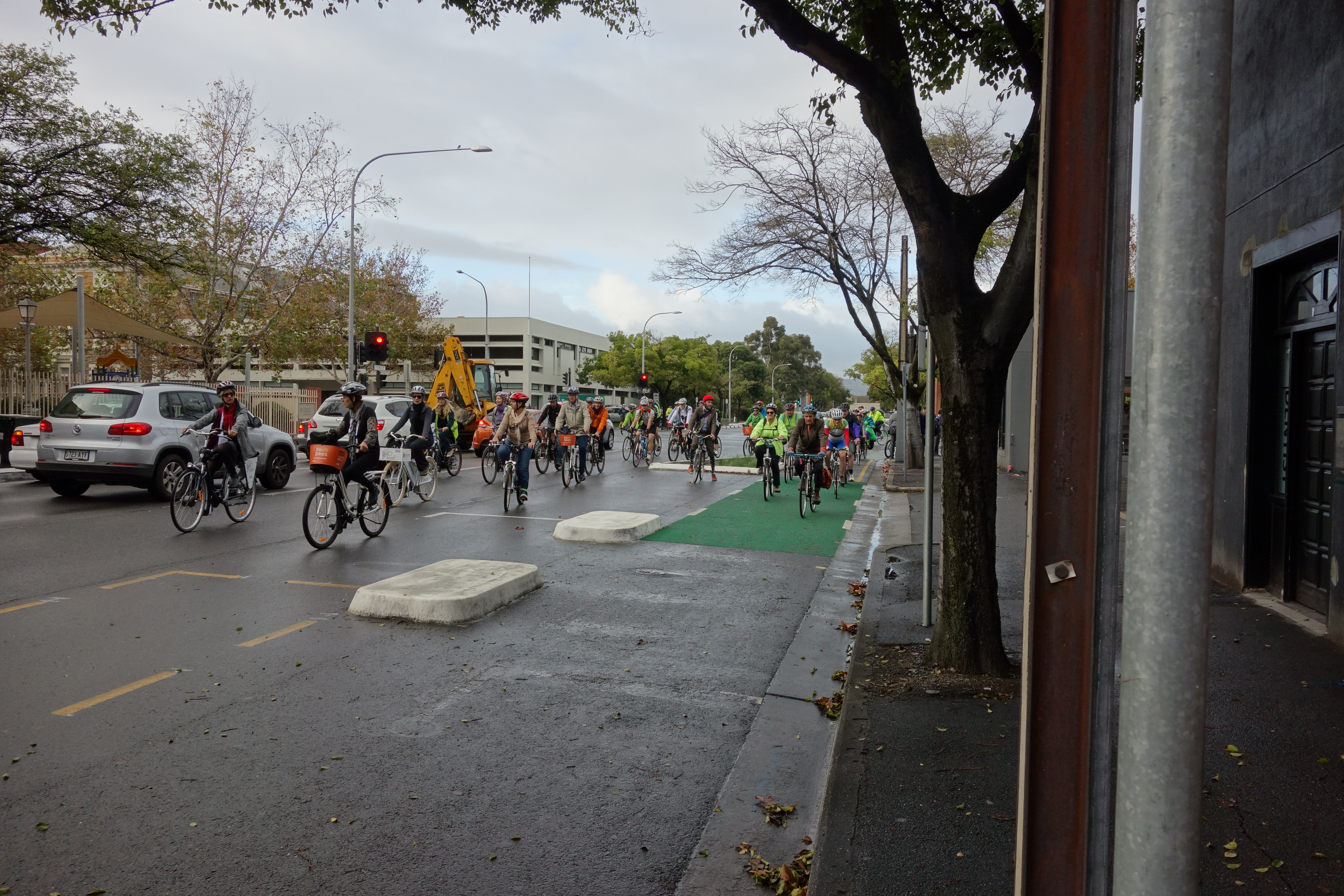
- Cyclists on Frome Street, including the Bikeway (2014)
- Coordinates: 34.921139°S 138.607780°E (North end); 34.931061°S 138.608549°E (South end)

General information
- Type: Street
- Location: Adelaide city centre
- Length: 1.1 km (0.7 mi)
- Opened: 1962

Major junctions
- North end: Frome Road; Adelaide
- North Terrace; Grenfell Street; Wakefield Street
- South end: Carrington Street; Adelaide

Location(s)
- LGA(s): City of Adelaide

Frome Street is a street in the East End of the Adelaide city centre, South Australia. It runs from North Terrace in the north to Angas Street, and then as Regent Street North to Carrington Street in the south. North of North Terrace, Frome Street continues towards North Adelaide as Frome Road.

The street was built in the early 1960s. Like Frome Road, it was named after Edward Charles Frome, who was Surveyor General of South Australia for most of the 1840s.

== History ==
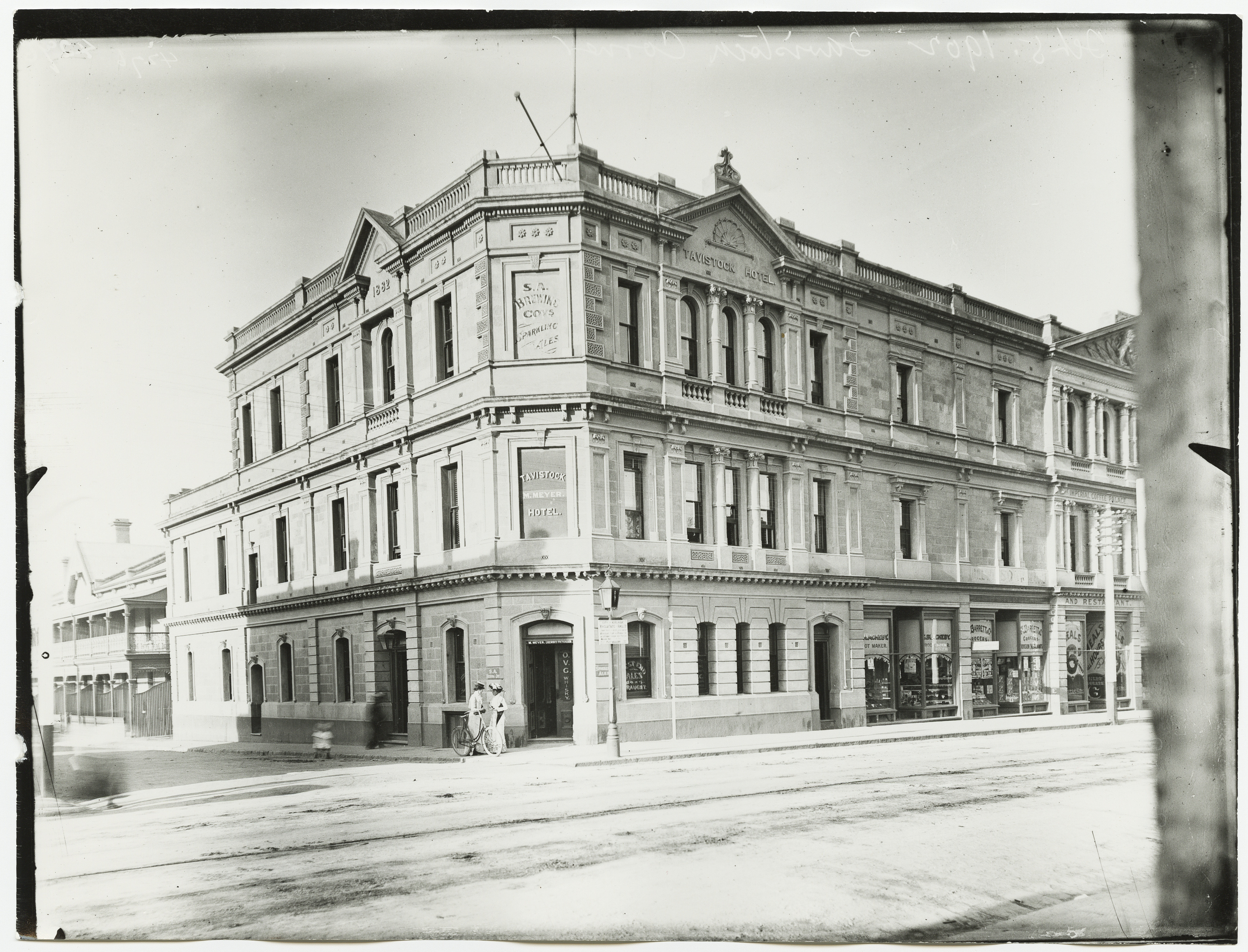
Tavistock Hotel, Adelaide in 1902. The building was demolished in 1962 to make way for Frome Street

Frome Street was not part of the William Light's plan for Adelaide, and did not exist as a main street until the 1960s. The 1960s Adelaide City Council planned Frome Street to extend from Frome Road as part of a link from Main North Road to Glen Osmond Road, to relieve traffic congestion in King William Street. The development of the street had commenced by 1962, widening Tavistock Street (North Terrace to Rundle Street) and Ackland Street (Grenfell Street to Wakefield Street) and purchasing properties in between.

In the 1970s the state government halted the development, so the street only extends as far south as Carrington Road.

== Frome Street Bikeway ==
In 2014, the southern part of Frome Street was modified to create separated bike lanes between the parallel car parking and the footpath. These lanes connect with minor laneways to the south and a path across the Adelaide Parklands as the Frome Street Bikeway. By June 2014, the separated bike lanes extended as far north as Pirie Street, with community consultation yet to occur for extension further north. In 2017–18, the bikeway was extended to Grenfell Street (completed February 2018), and part of what had already been built was removed and relaid to match.

There were some calls to remove the city's first separated bikeway, but after the Adelaide Design Manual was produced, followed by the Bikeways Design Guide, the state government gave the City a A$6 million grant to help it rebuild the Frome Street bikeway as well as a new east–west cycling corridor. The City matched the amount for its own spend on the project.

As of December 2019, the Frome Street Bikeway is being integrated into the North-South Bikeway, which is "build[ing] on the existing Frome Bikeway and will connect the existing Rugby/Porter Bikeway in Unley to the Braund Road Bike Boulevard in Prospect". The Rundle Street to Greenhill Road section has been completed. The bikeway was completed in 2024-2025.
