= Royal Adelaide Hospital =

- SA Health
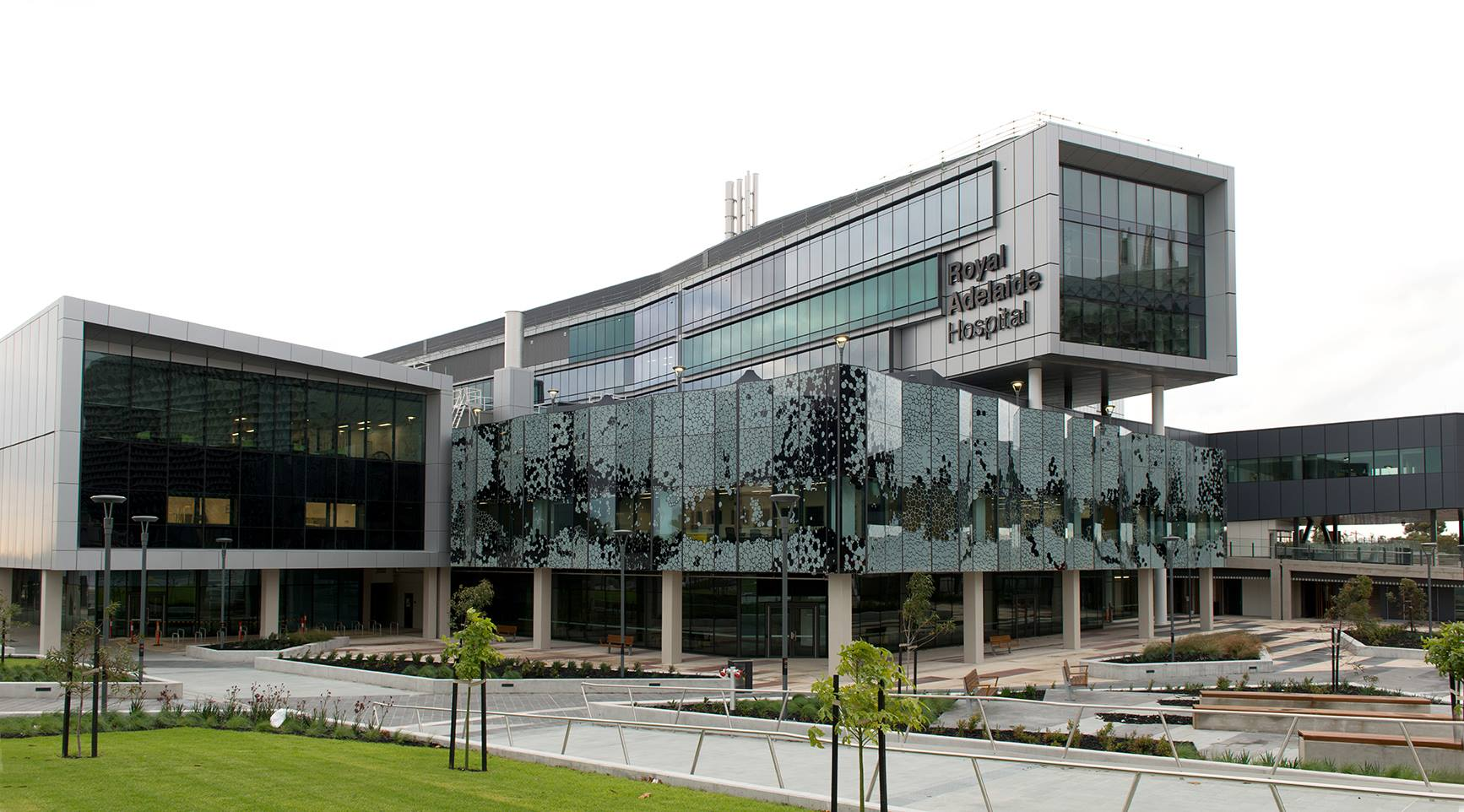
- Front view of the new RAH

Geography
- Location: Adelaide, South Australia, Australia

Organisation
- Care system: Medicare
- Type: General, Teaching
- Affiliated university: University of Adelaide

Services
- Emergency department: Yes
- Beds: 800

Helipads
- Helipad: ICAO: YXAA
Number	Length		Surface
Number	ft	m	Surface
1			concrete
2			concrete

History
- Founded: Original building 1840; new building 2017

Links
- Website: www.rah.sa.gov.au

The Royal Adelaide Hospital (RAH), colloquially known by its initials or pronounced as "the Rah", is South Australia's largest hospital, owned by the state government as part of Australia's public health care system. The RAH provides tertiary health care services for South Australia and provides secondary care clinical services to residents of Adelaide's central metropolitan area, which includes the inner suburbs.

The original Adelaide Hospital was built in 1840 at the eastern end of North Terrace, Adelaide, with its first building superseded in 1856 and many alterations and additions over the following 175 years. It was prefixed by the "Royal" in 1939. In 2017 it was replaced by the new hospital, built at the western end of North Terrace. The redevelopment on the site of the old RAH is known as Lot Fourteen.

The hospital is the most expensive building ever built in Australia, as well as the second most expensive hospital ever built in the world, at US$2.44 billion in construction and equipment costs.

== History ==
=== 1841–2017: Original hospital buildings ===
RAH – old building (1841–2017)
Expand
Geography
Location	Adelaide, South Australia, Australia
Coordinates	34.9199°S 138.6091°E
Organisation
Type	Teaching
Affiliated university	University of Adelaide
Services
Emergency department	Yes
Beds	680
History
Founded	1841
Closed	2017

Links
- Lists: Hospitals in Australia

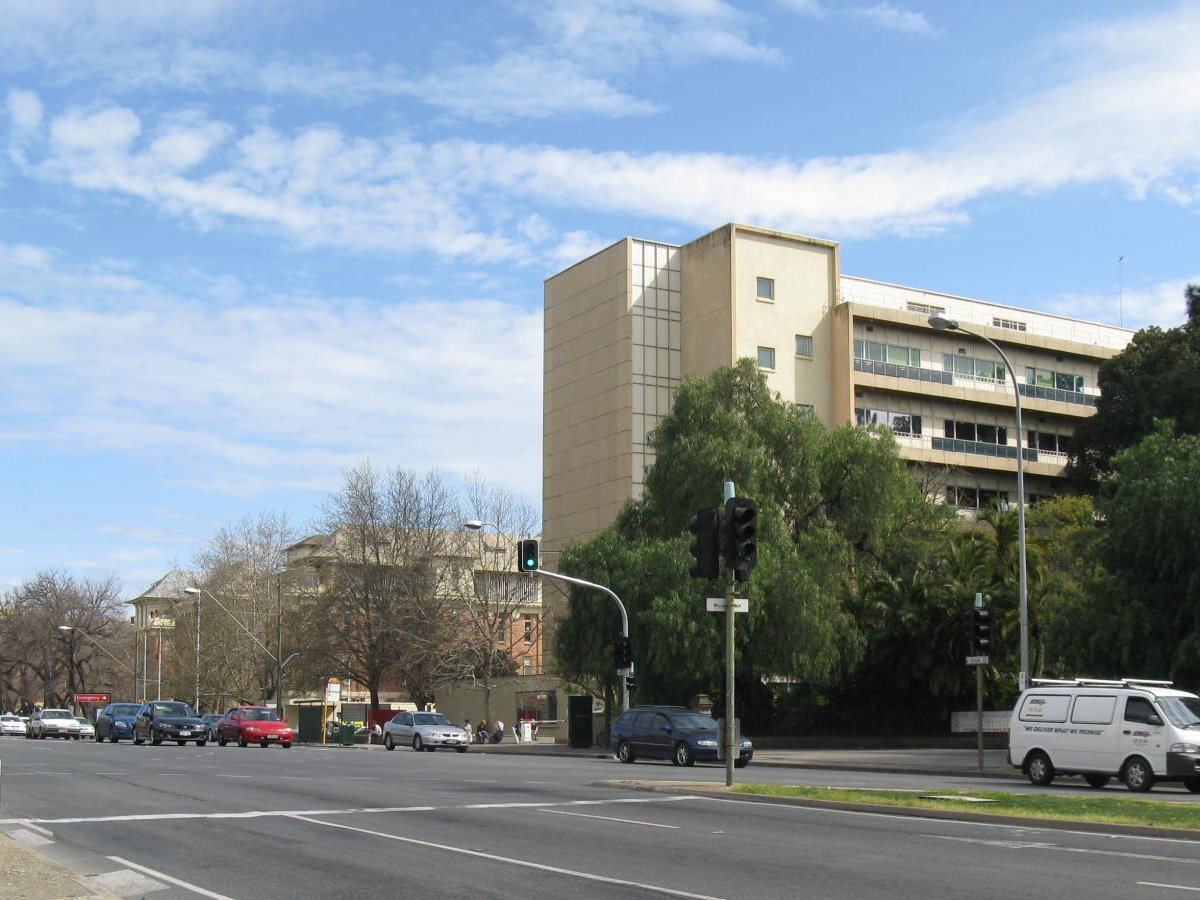
The East Wing of the old RAH

Colonel Light had originally envisaged the hospital in the Eastern parklands.

On 15 July 1840 Lieutenant-Colonel George Gawler, then governor of South Australia, laid the foundation stone for the Adelaide Hospital, which is regarded as the hospital's foundation day, although the first patients were only admitted in January or February of the following year. It was located in the Adelaide Park Lands on the north side of North Terrace, east of Frome Road.

In 1856, around the time of the establishment of the Adelaide Botanic Garden to the east, a second building was completed on the site, and the original hospital was used to house patients from the nearby Adelaide Lunatic Asylum, which was sold off to the Botanic Garden.

In 1891 the hospital opened its first operating theatre, with rows of raised seating to enable students and others to witness operations. In 1899, only four years after x-ray was discovered, an x-ray facility was opened, by 1939 boasting an extensive X-ray department for the treatment of cancer. The hospital installed its first telephone system in 1901 and performed its first blood transfusion in 1925.

The hospital was officially proclaimed "Royal" on 2 November 1939. At that time it was the largest general hospital in Australia, and included a modern dental hospital. It also functioned as a teaching hospital for medical and dental students, in conjunction with the University of Adelaide (a partnership which has continued to the present day).

The old RAH stood adjacent to both the University of Adelaide (established 1874) and the University of South Australia (established as South Australian School of Mines and Industries on that site in 1889). Its campus was also home to the University of Adelaide's Medical School and the Hanson Institute and SA Pathology.

The old hospital's morgue still stands in the Botanic Gardens.

The old RAH included an advanced burns unit, the Adult Burn Centre, led by John Greenwood, and in 2009 became the only burns unit to be verified by the American Burn Association outside of North America.

The Royal Adelaide Hospital is the only provider of hyperbaric oxygen therapy in South Australia. Its Hyperbaric Medical Unit (HMU) opened in 1985. The principal treatment equipment as of 2013 was a pair of twin-lock, multi-place hyperbaric chambers. One of these chambers was the first rectangular steel chamber in Australia.

After completion of the new building in 2017, a phased move to the new premises took place, and the old site was designated Lot Fourteen, with various plans mooted regarding its redevelopment, including a space hub. The heritage buildings on the site are being kept.

=== 2017: new building ===
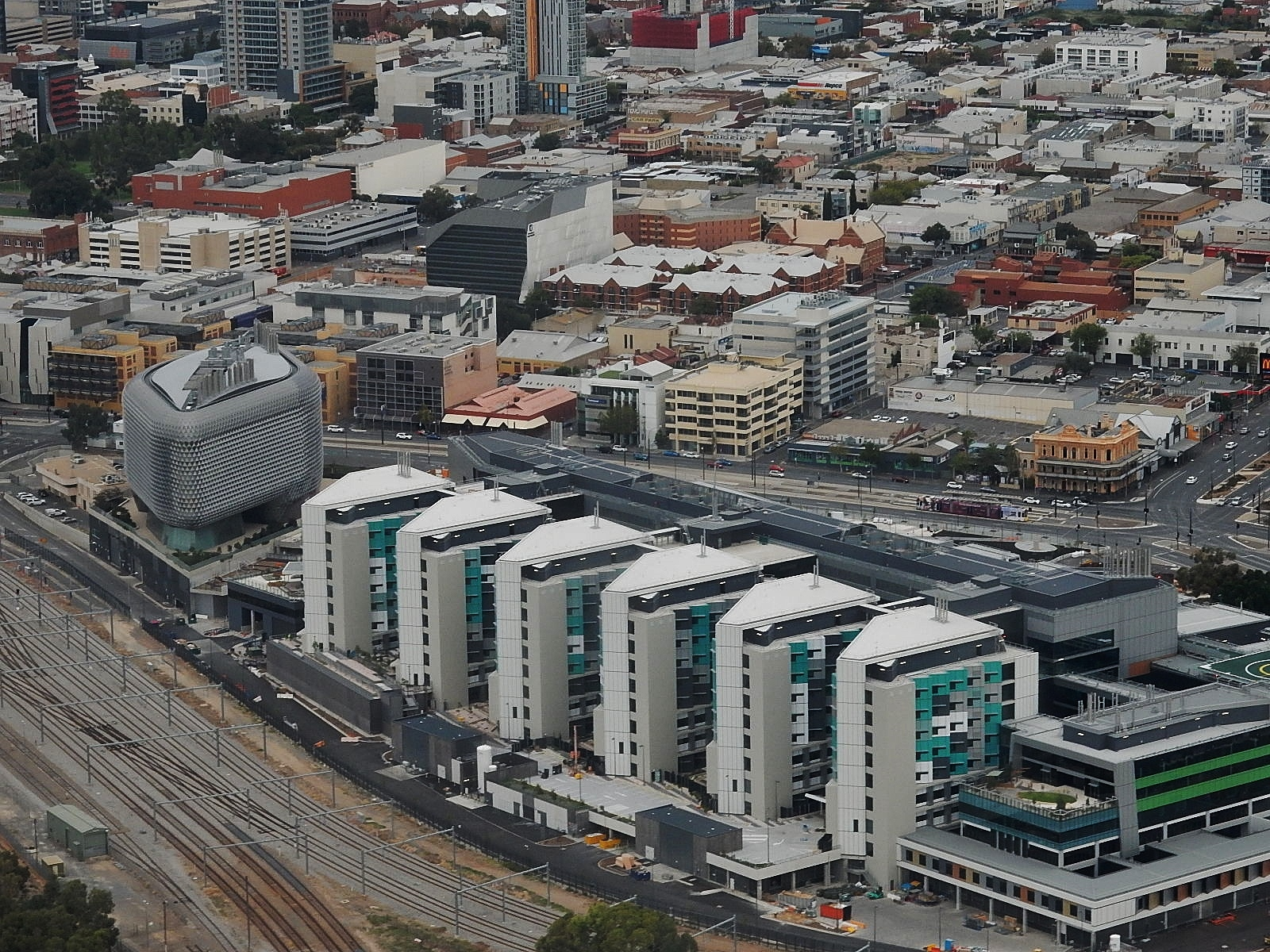
The new RAH and SAHMRI buildings in the emerging BioMed City being constructed over former railyards.

The new Royal Adelaide Hospital is located on a 10 hectares (25 acres) former railyards site within the Adelaide Park Lands. It is situated on the north side of North Terrace and west of Morphett Street. Starting construction in 2011, costing over A$2 billion, the new Royal Adelaide Hospital is the most expensive hospital built in Australia, taking 1st place from the $2 billion Fiona Stanley Hospital in Perth. The contractor was a joint venture of Hansen Yuncken and Leighton Contractors. The building was completed in 2017, and the move from the old hospital into the new site was completed over four days, 4–7 September.

More than 6,000 staff are expected to work at the hospital, and all rooms are single patient suites with private bathroom facilities. There are 40 operating theatres, each measuring 65m^{2}. The building is technologically advanced, with a fleet of automated robotic vehicles to help move supplies, meals and equipment around the hospital, and a tailor-made patient electronic medical record.

The hospital was designed to achieve a 50% reduction in greenhouse gas emissions compared to equivalent hospitals. A co-generation system uses waste heat from energy generators for the domestic hot water system. Orientation of the buildings is optimised to minimise solar thermal loads, with extensive daylight penetration to reduce artificial lighting requirements. Rainwater and stormwater harvesting is used to offset potable water requirements, along with extensive use of water sensitive landscaping and a water efficient thermal plant.

The new hospital was initially to be renamed Marjorie Jackson-Nelson Hospital after the former Governor of South Australia. However, in 2009 the RAH name was retained after public opposition and at the former governor's request.

== Description ==
=== BioMed City ===
The new RAH forms the largest part of Adelaide's emerging biomedical precinct called BioMed City. Other recently completed facilities in the precinct include the South Australian Health and Medical Research Institute (SAHMRI), the University of Adelaide Health and Medical Sciences building, the University of South Australia's Health Innovation Building, and the state's Dental Hospital. SAHMRI is building a $300 million second facility due to be completed by 2022 to house the Australian Bragg Centre with Australia's first proton therapy unit. There are also plans for the Women's and Children's Hospital to be relocated to the precinct adjacent the RAH by 2024.

=== Specialist facilities ===
==== Hyperbaric Medical Unit ====
The HMU, opened at the old RAH in 1985, is the state referral service for diving and hyperbaric medicine. The RAH is the second oldest diving and hyperbaric facility in Australia, and has been responsible for co-ordinating the Divers Emergency Service (DES), a telephone-based consultation service for diving-related matters within Australia, the Southern Pacific and Southeast Asia.

== Arms ==
Coat of arms of Royal Adelaide Hospital
Notes Granted 3 February 1967 Crest A Piping Shrike displayed Proper perched upon five mullets in fess Argent. Torse Or and Vert Escutcheon Per chevron Vert and Or in chief two towers Or in base in front of an open book Argent bound and clasped a Rod of Aesculapius Gules the serpent Vert on a chief Gules a lion passant Or. Motto Servire Ac Docere

== Tram stop ==
The Royal Adelaide Hospital is also the location of a stop on the Glenelg tram line.

Preceding station	Adelaide Metro	Following station
Terminus	Glenelg tram line	City West towards Moseley Square or Botanic Gardens
Thebarton Limited service towards Adelaide Entertainment Centre	Glenelg tram line	City West towards Moseley Square or Botanic Gardens

== See also ==
- List of hospitals in Australia
- Pamela Joy Spry, director of nursing at RAH from 1973 to 1984
